= Laag-Nieuwkoop =

- Hamlet
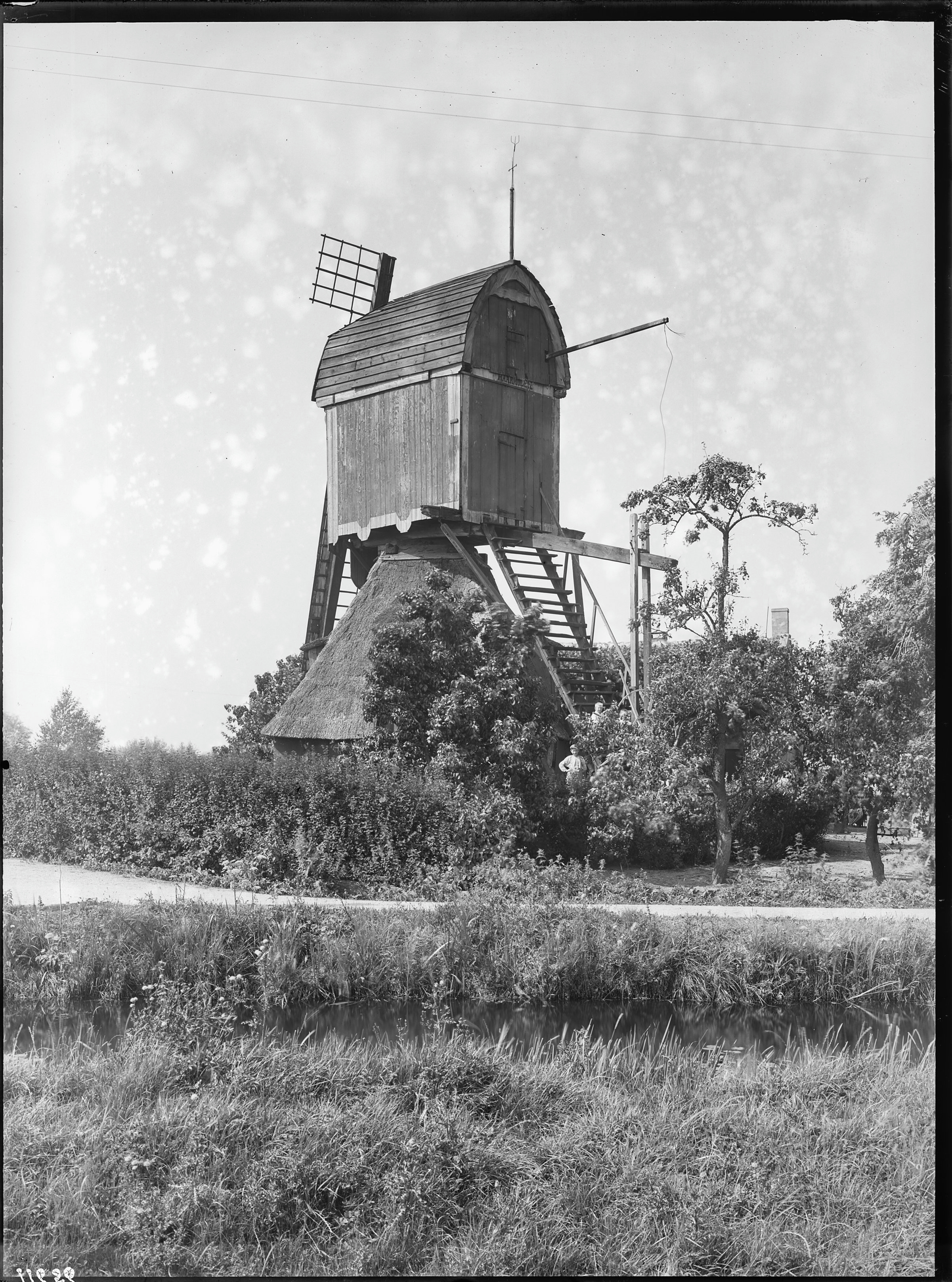
- Wind mill Haarmolen

- Location in the Netherlands Laag-Nieuwkoop (Netherlands)
- Coordinates: 52°07′56″N 4°59′01″E
- Country: Netherlands
- Province: Utrecht
- Municipality: Stichtse Vecht
- Time zone: UTC+1 (CET)
  - Summer (DST): UTC+2 (CEST)
- Postal code: 3455
- Dialing code: 030

Laag-Nieuwkoop is a hamlet in the Dutch municipality of Stichtse Vecht.

Between 1815 and 1942, Laag-Nieuwkoop was a separate municipality, consisting of the village, the nearby hamlets of Gieltjesdorp, and Zuideinde (the south end of Portengen).

The hamlet was first mentioned in the 14th century Nieucoop, and means "the lower new part of a concession". Laag-Nieuwkoop is not a statistical entity, and the postal authorities have placed it under Vleuten. The hamlet does not have place name signs. In 1840, it was home to 89 people. Nowadays, it consists of about 25 houses.
