= Scheendijk =

- Hamlet
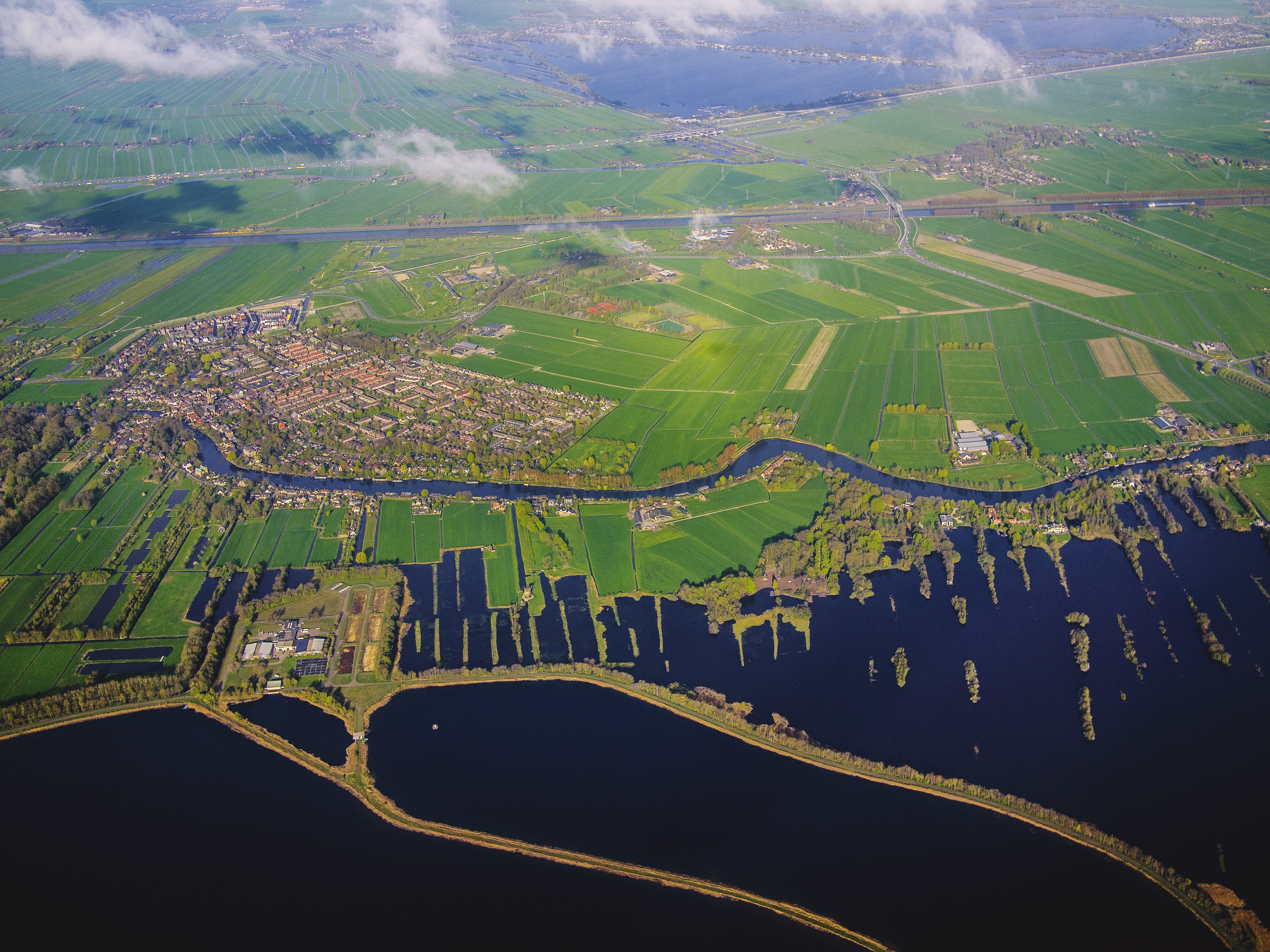
- Aerial view. Scheendijk is the front

- Location in the Netherlands Scheendijk (Netherlands)
- Coordinates: 52.17971°N 5.02185°E
- Country: Netherlands
- Province: Utrecht
- Municipality: Stichtse Vecht

Area
  - Total: 0.37 km^{2} (0.14 sq mi)

Population (2021)
  - Total: 475
  - Density: 1,300/km^{2} (3,300/sq mi)
- Time zone: UTC+1 (CET)
  - Summer (DST): UTC+2 (CEST)
- Postal code: 3621
- Dialing code: 0346

Scheendijk is a hamlet in the Dutch province of Utrecht. It is a part of the municipality of Stichtse Vecht, and lies about 10 km northwest of Utrecht.

Scheendijk is found in an area known for its lakes and ribbed sand islands, called the Loosdrechtse Plassen, which many tourists visit every year. The lake area is dotted with houses along embankments with yachting marinas.

It was first mentioned in 1746 as De Scheyding, and means the division dike. The postal authorities have placed it under Breukelen. Scheendijk has its own place name signs.
