= Spengen =

- Hamlet
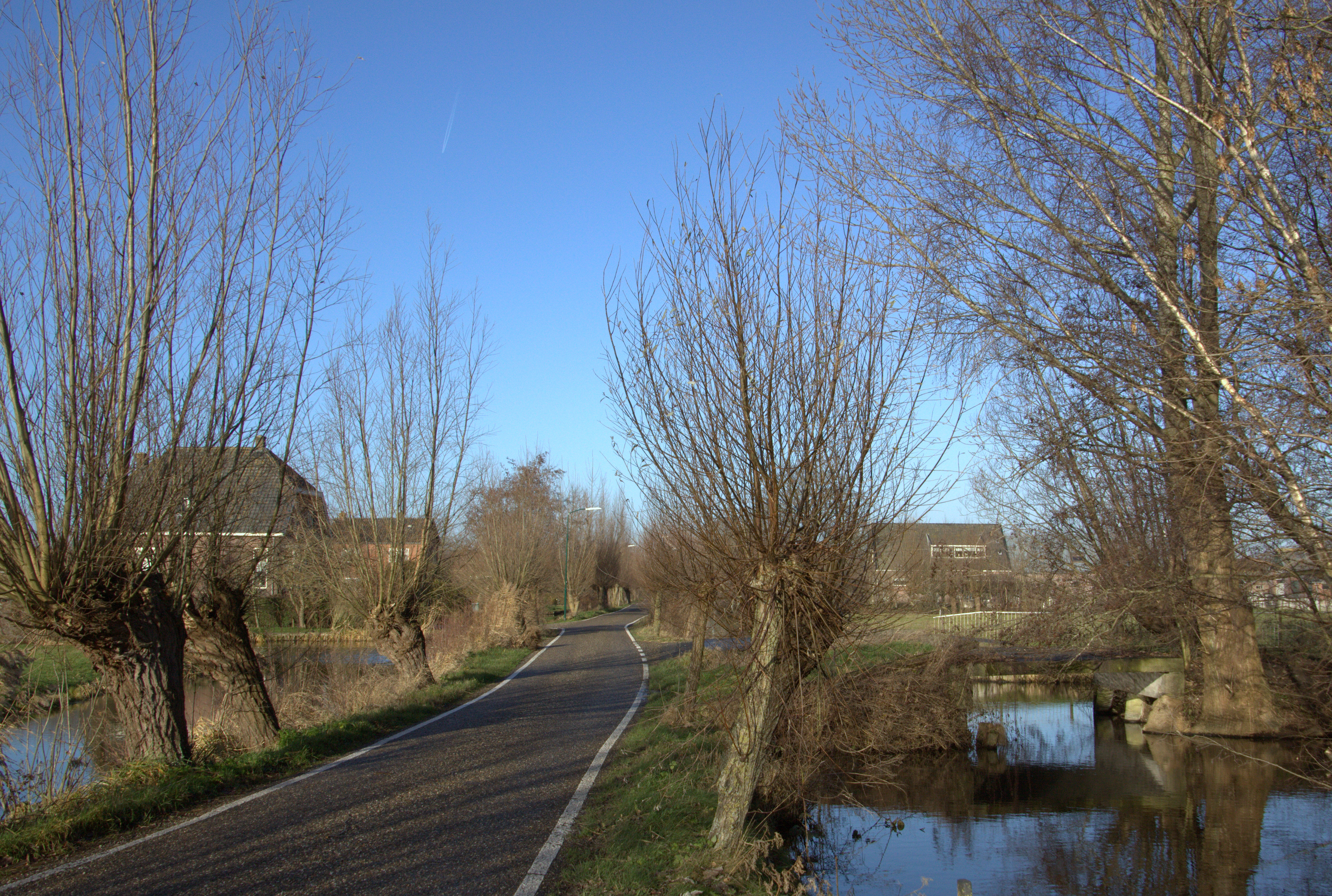
- Village view

- Location in the Netherlands Spengen (Netherlands)
- Coordinates: 52°09′28″N 4°55′12″E
- Country: Netherlands
- Province: Utrecht
- Municipality: Stichtse Vecht

Area
  - Total: 3.44 km^{2} (1.33 sq mi)

Population (2021)
  - Total: 155
  - Density: 45.1/km^{2} (117/sq mi)
- Time zone: UTC+1 (CET)
  - Summer (DST): UTC+2 (CEST)
- Postal code: 3628
- Dialing code: 0346

Spengen is a hamlet in the Dutch province of Utrecht. It is a part of the municipality of Stichtse Vecht, and lies about 10 km northeast of Woerden.

The hamlet was first mentioned in 1217 as Spanien, and is a reference to Spain. It started as a peat excavation settlement in the 11th or 12th century. The postal authorities have placed it under Kockengen, and it has no place name signs. In 1840, it was home to 162 people.

== Gallery ==
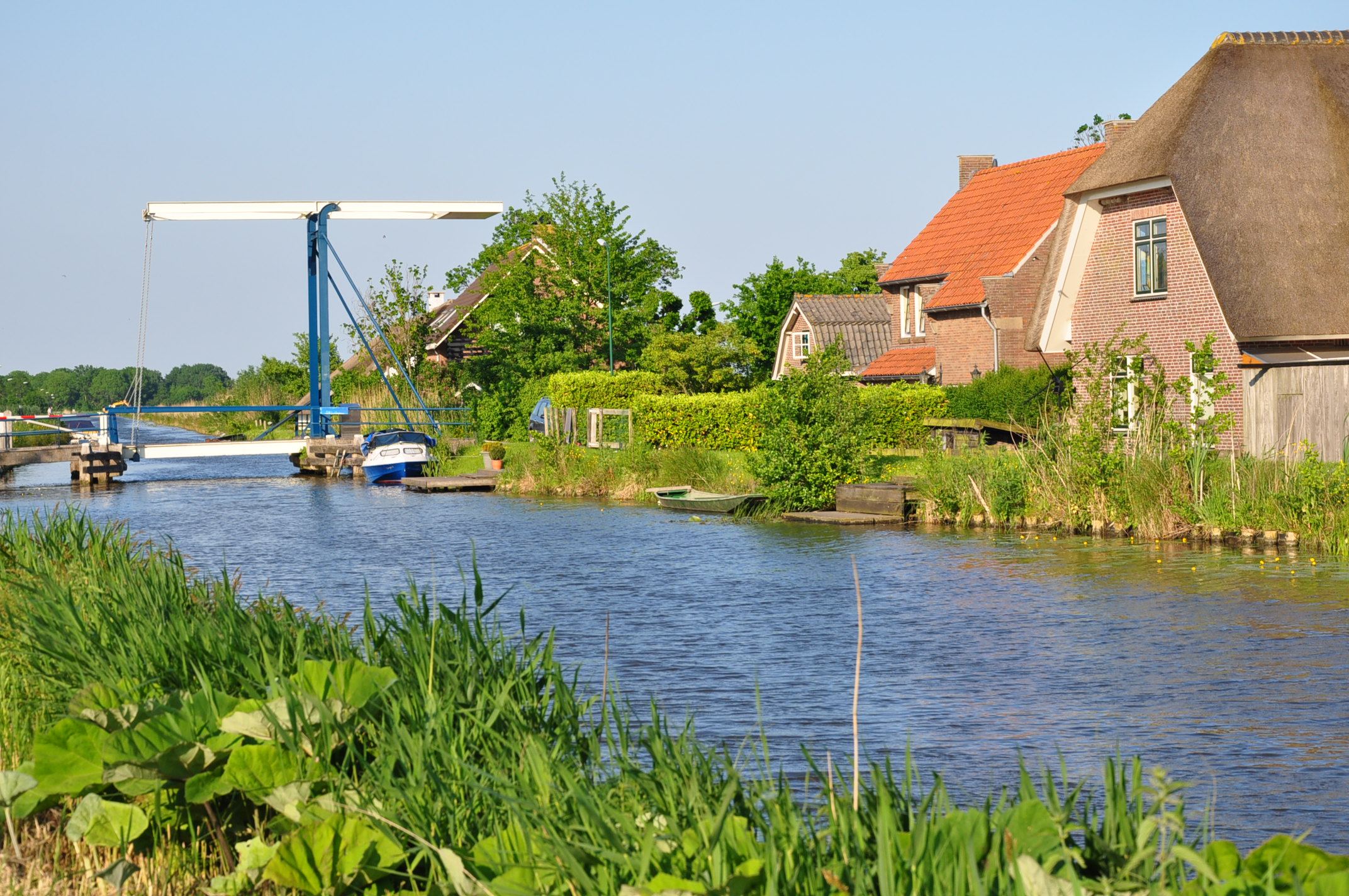
Farms in Spengen, with drawbridge over the Geer canal.

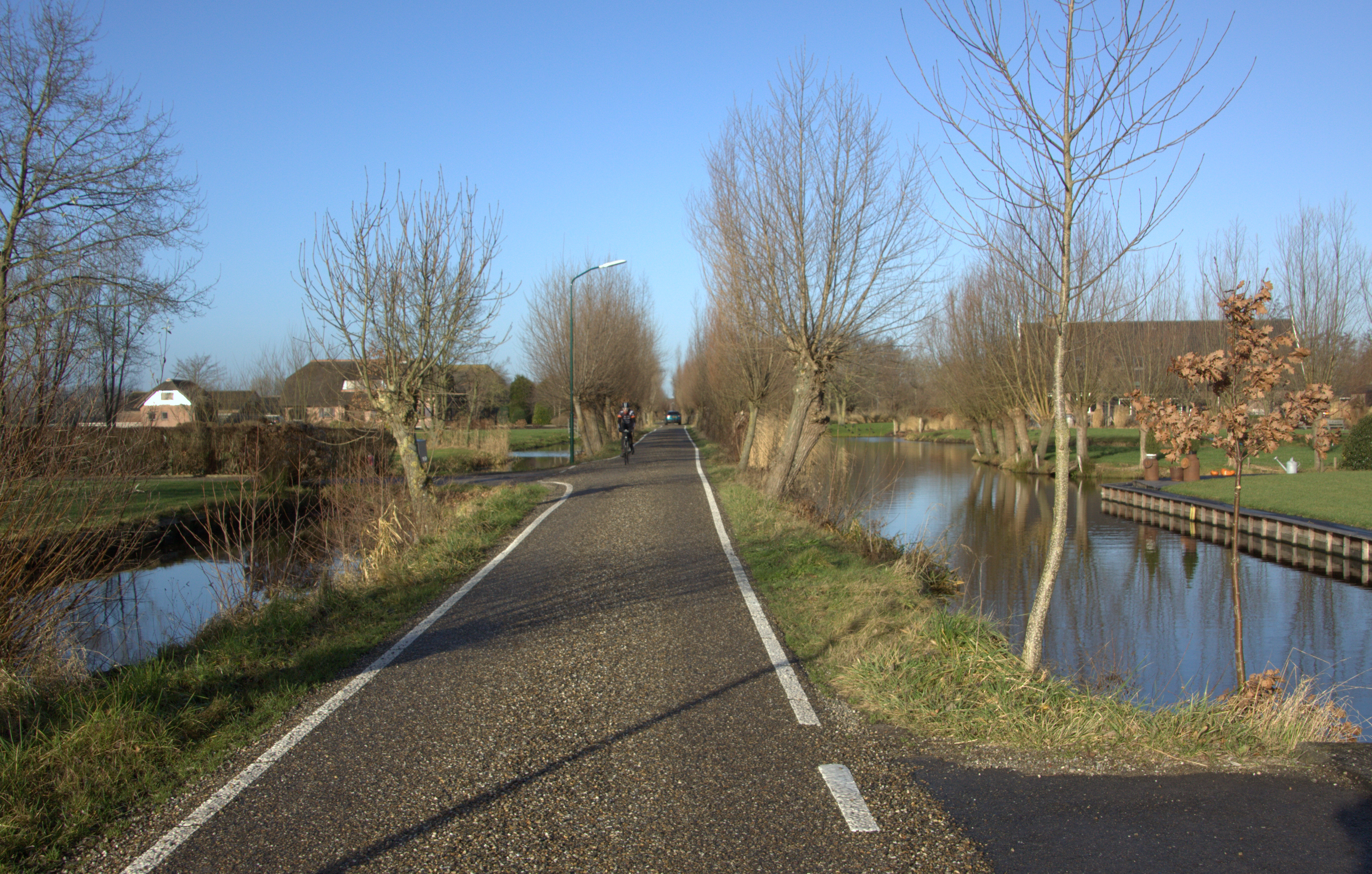
Narrow street with wide canals

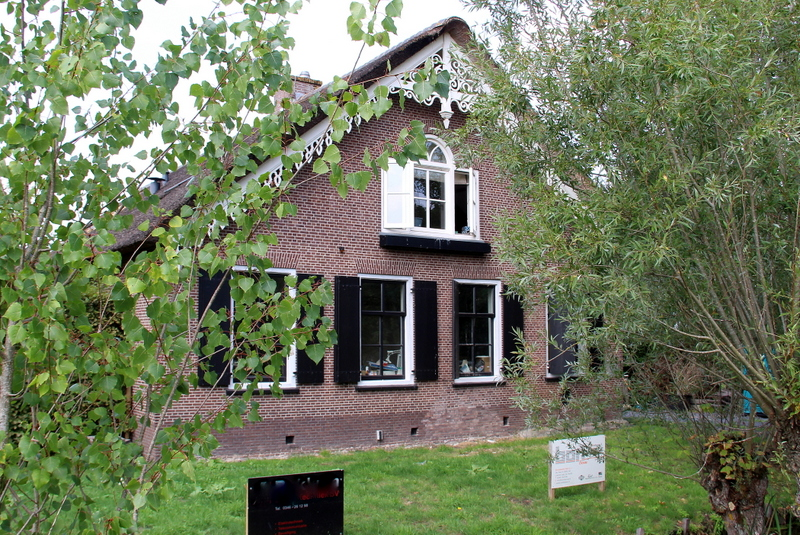
Farm in Spengen
