= Maarssen =

- Town and former municipality
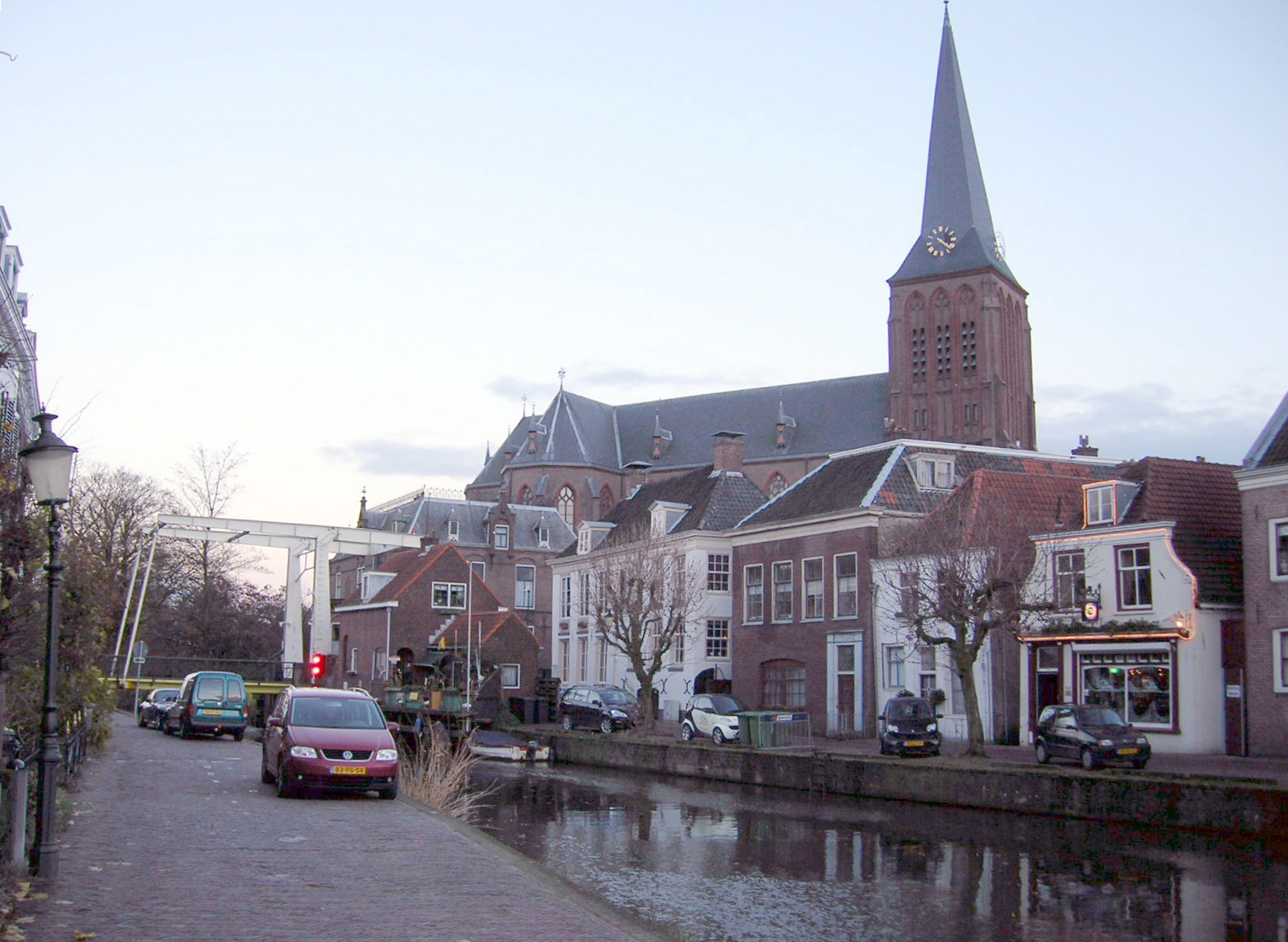
- Church near the Schippersgracht, Maarssen-dorp 2007

- Flag Coat of arms

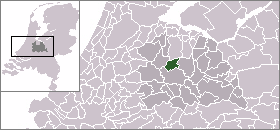
- Coordinates: 52.135144°N 5.041297°E
- Country: Netherlands
- Province: Utrecht
- Municipality: Stichtse Vecht

Area (2006)
  - Total: 30.86 km^{2} (11.92 sq mi)
  - Land: 27.20 km^{2} (10.50 sq mi)
  - Water: 3.66 km^{2} (1.41 sq mi)

Population (1 January 2007)
  - Total: 39,363
  - Density: 1,447/km^{2} (3,750/sq mi)
- Source: CBS, Statline
- Time zone: UTC+1 (CET)
  - Summer (DST): UTC+2 (CEST)
- Website: stichtseVecht.nl

Maarssen (Dutch pronunciation: [ˈmaːrsə(n)]) is a town in the middle of the Netherlands, in the province of Utrecht, along the river Vecht and the Amsterdam–Rhine Canal. The west of Maarssen is called Maarssen-broek, whereas the east is called Maarssen-Dorp. The two localities, along with other small nearby towns, constitute the area of Maarssen.

On 1 January 2011 Maarssen merged with the councils of Breukelen and Loenen to become municipality of Stichtse Vecht.

== Population centres ==
The former municipality of Maarssen consisted of the following cities, towns, villages (dorp) and/or districts:

- Maarssen (colloquially "Maarssen-dorp") and Maarssenbroek
- Maarssenbroek, a town
- Maarsseveen, a hamlet
- Molenpolder, a hamlet
- Oud-Maarsseveen, a hamlet
- Oud-Zuilen, a village
- Tienhoven, a village

== Transportation ==
- Maarssen railway station
