= Breukelen-Sint Pieters =

Coordinates: 52°10′N 5°01′E

Breukelen-Sint Pieters is a former municipality in the Dutch province of Utrecht. The municipality was formed in 1815, when the municipality of Breukelen was split into two parts. Breukelen-Sint Pieters covered the eastern part of the former municipality, including the village of Breukeleveen.

In 1949, the municipalities of Breukelen-Nijenrode and Breukelen-Sint Pieters merged again, to form the municipality of Breukelen.
