= Oukoop =

Oukoop may refer to:

- Oukoop, Utrecht
- Oukoop, South Holland
