= Molenpolder =

- Hamlet
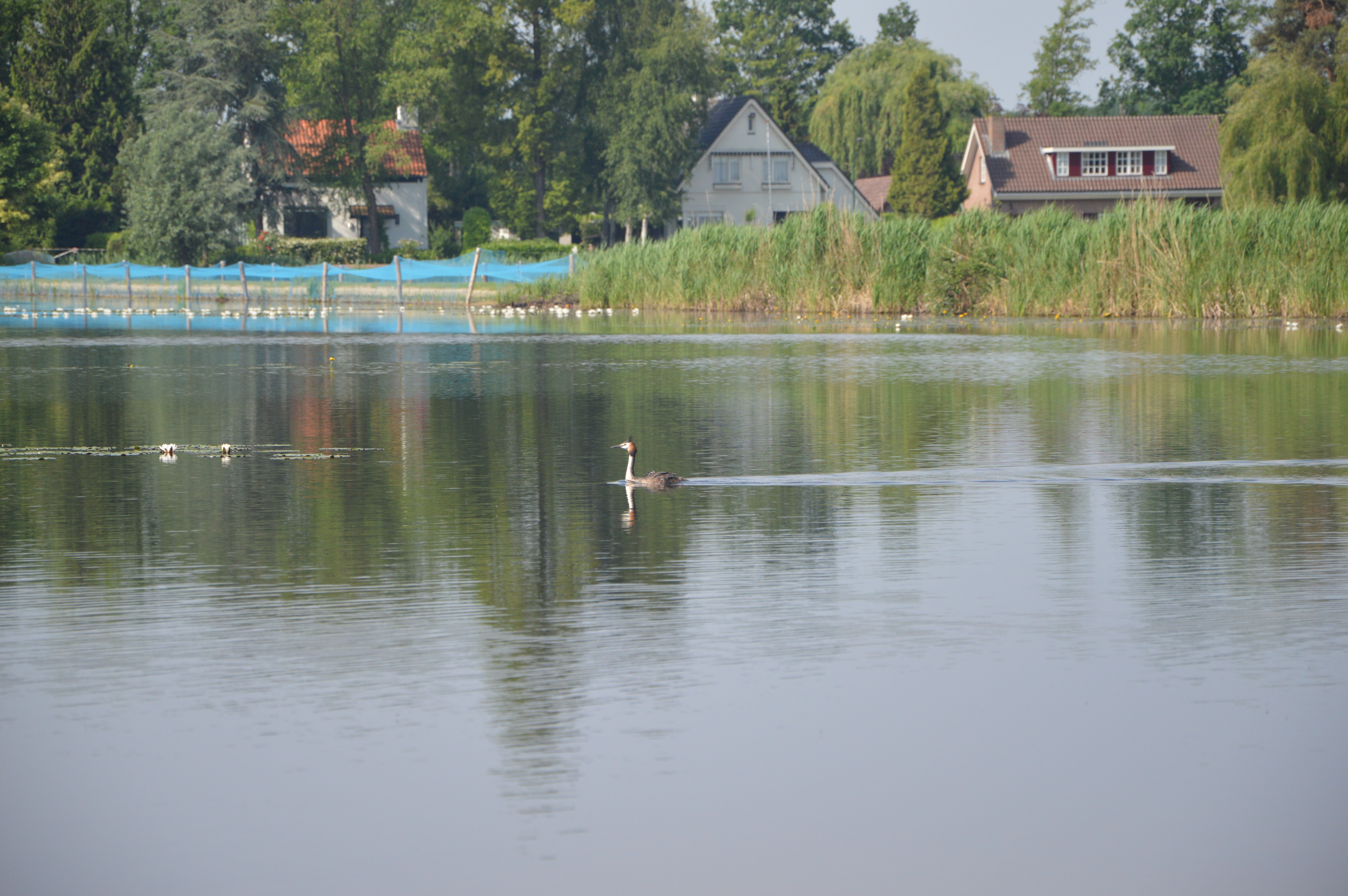

- Location in the Netherlands Molenpolder (Netherlands)
- Coordinates: 52°8′50″N 5°5′00″E
- Country: Netherlands
- Province: Utrecht
- Municipality: Stichtse Vecht

Area
  - Total: 4.57 km^{2} (1.76 sq mi)

Population (2021)
  - Total: 930
  - Density: 200/km^{2} (530/sq mi)
- Time zone: UTC+1 (CET)
  - Summer (DST): UTC+2 (CEST)
- Postal code: 3612
- Dialing code: 0346

Molenpolder is a hamlet in the municipality of Stichtse Vecht, province of Utrecht, the Netherlands. Within this municipality Molenpolder belongs to the village of Tienhoven.

Until 2011 the hamlet was part of the former municipality of Maarssen. Including a number of bungalow parks about 900 people are living in Molenplder.

Stichtse Vecht also contains a wet nature reserve called Molenpolder, bordering the hamlet of Molenpolder.
