= Stichtse Vecht =

- Municipality
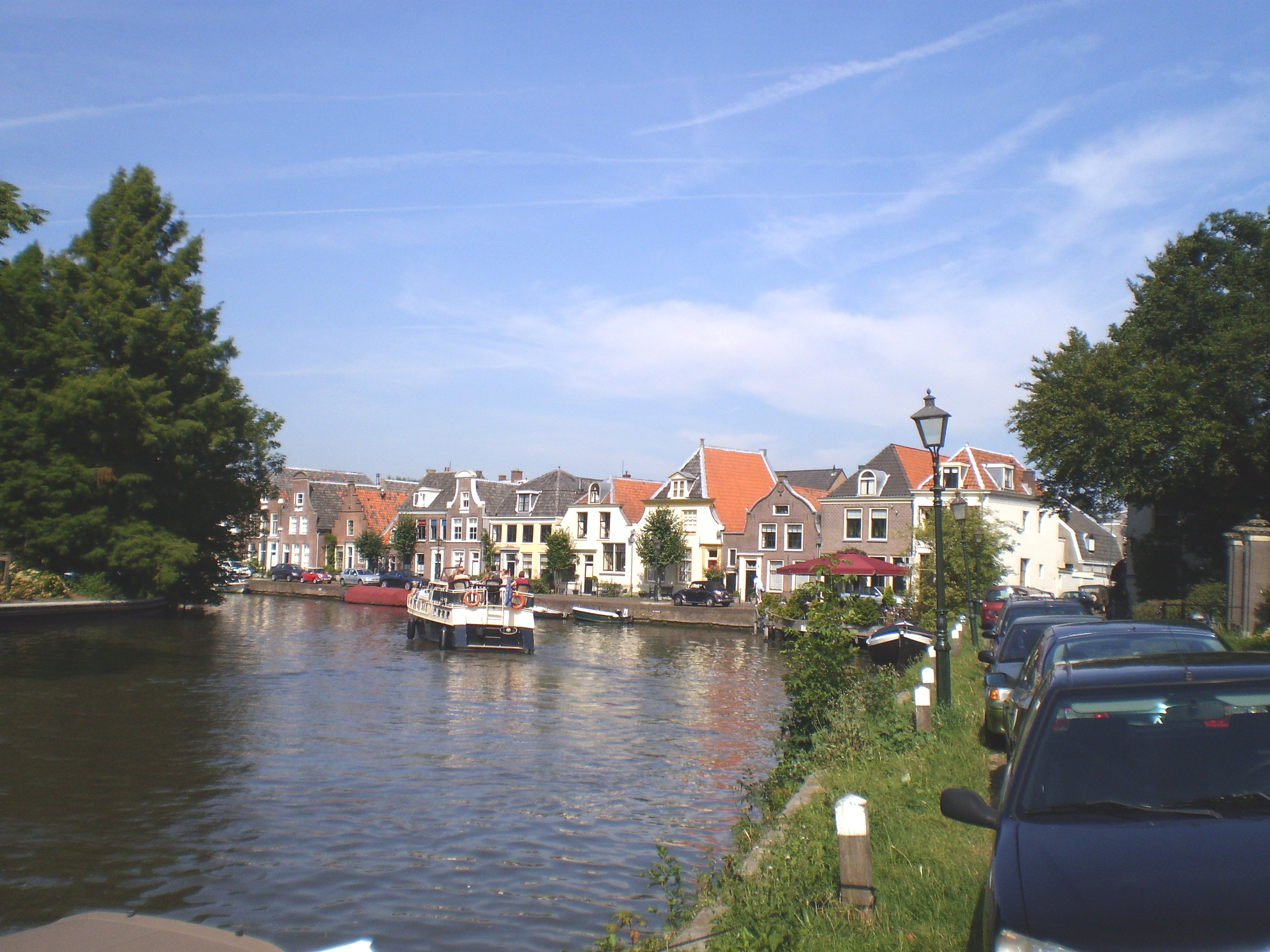
- The Vecht river through Maarssen

- Flag Coat of arms

- Location in Utrecht
- Coordinates: 52°9′N 5°2′E
- Country: Netherlands
- Province: Utrecht
- Established: 1 January 2011

Government
  - Body: Municipal council
  - Mayor: Ap Reinders

Area
  - Total: 106.82 km^{2} (41.24 sq mi)
  - Land: 96.10 km^{2} (37.10 sq mi)
  - Water: 10.72 km^{2} (4.14 sq mi)
- Elevation: 1 m (3.3 ft)

Population (January 2021)
  - Total: 65,108
  - Density: 678/km^{2} (1,760/sq mi)
- Time zone: UTC+1 (CET)
  - Summer (DST): UTC+2 (CEST)
- Postcode: 1393, 3600–3612, 3620–3622, 3626–3634
- Area code: 0294, 0346
- Website: www.stichtsevecht.nl

Stichtse Vecht is a municipality of the Netherlands and lies in the northwestern part of the province of Utrecht.

The municipality has about 63,000 inhabitants and covers an area of about 107 km^{2} (41 sq mi).

Stichtse Vecht was formed on 1 January 2011 by a merger of the municipalities of Breukelen (in the west), Maarssen (in the east) and Loenen (in the north).

== Geography ==
Stichtse Vecht is situated north of the city of Utrecht, in an area called the Vechtstreek. It is near sea level and is mostly rural with many pastures.

Within its boundaries are the Maarsseveense Plassen, which are recreational lakes. Northeast it borders the Loosdrechtse Plassen, also recreational lakes, which lie in neighbouring municipality of Wijdemeren.

The Amsterdam–Rhine Canal and the river Vecht cross the municipality from south to north.

== Topography ==
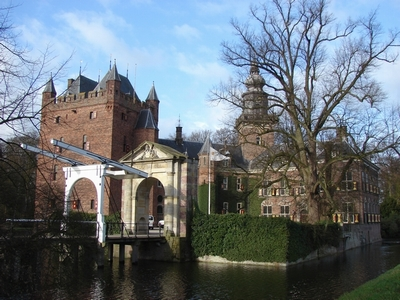
Nijenrode Castle in Breukelen

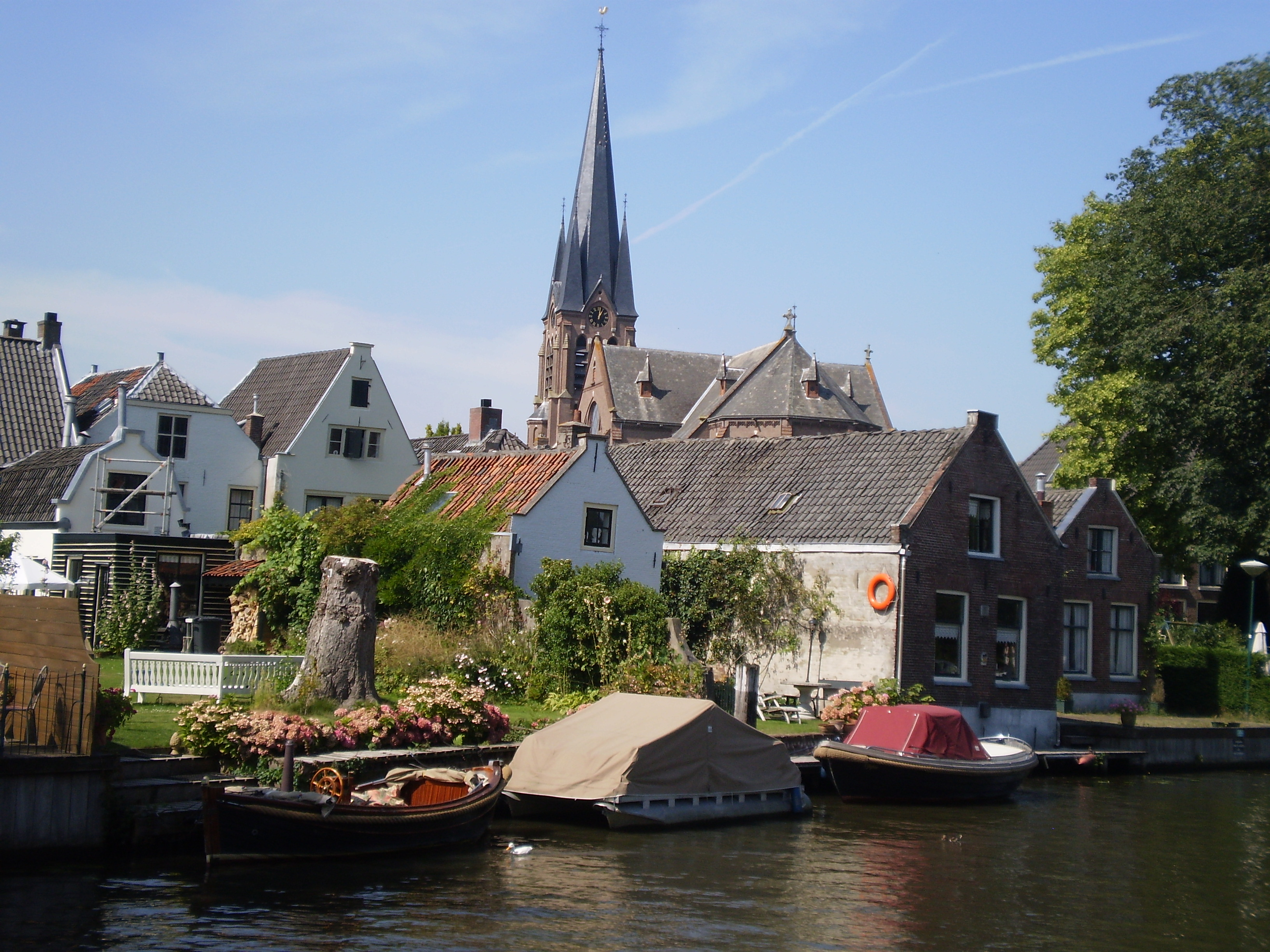
View of Breukelen

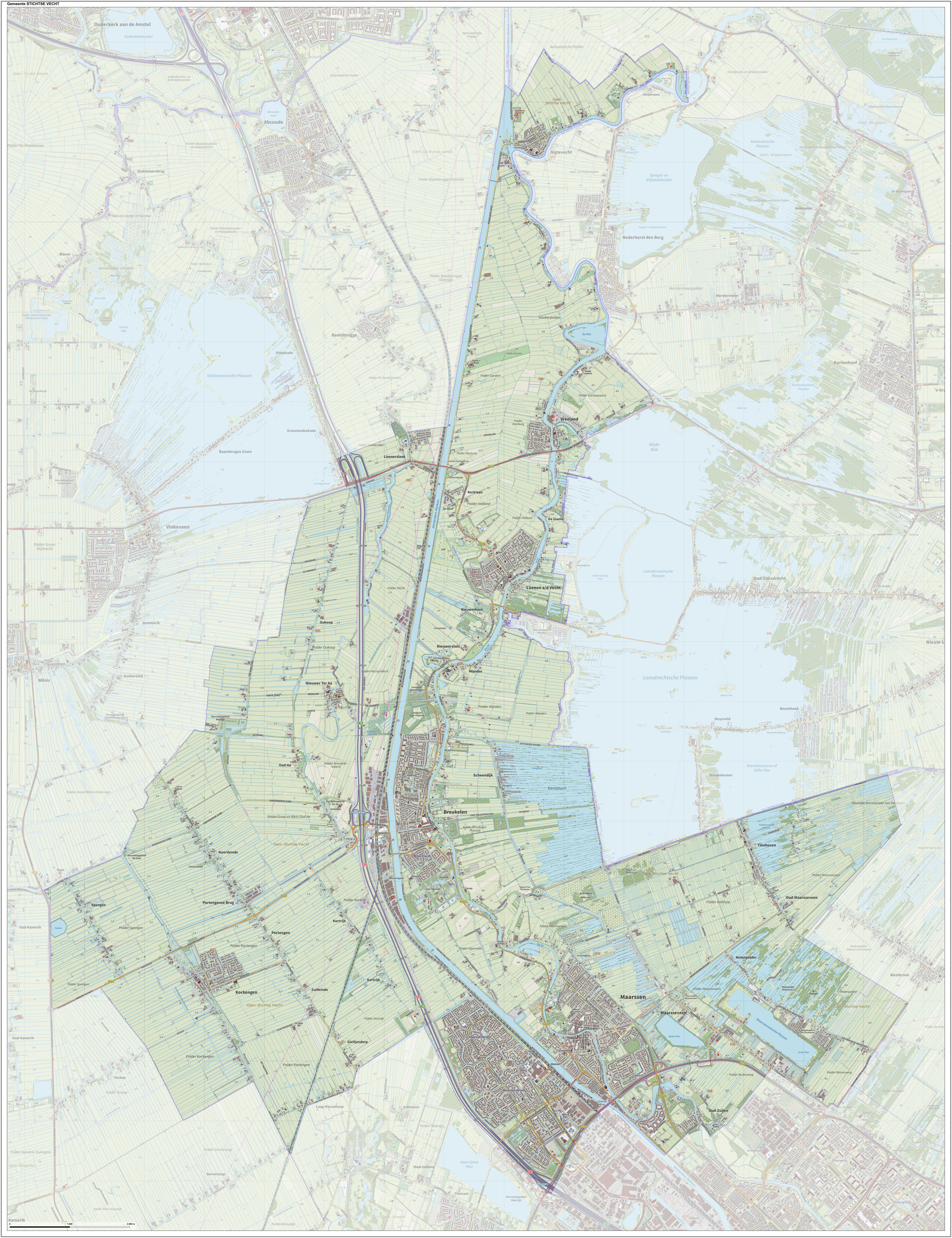
Map of Stichtse Vecht, June 2015

== History ==
The municipality contains several country estates (buitenplaatsen) and castles, like Nijenrode Castle, Slot Zuylen and Huis te Mijnden.

== Transportation ==
The A2 motorway crosses the municipality from south to north.

There are two railway stations:

- Breukelen railway station
- Maarssen railway station

== Population centers ==
Former municipality of Breukelen:

- Breukelen
- Gieltjesdorp
- Kockengen
- Kortrijk
- Laagnieuwkoop
- Nieuwer-Ter-Aa
- Noordeinde
- Oud-Aa
- Oukoop
- Portengen
- Portengense Brug
- Scheendijk
- Spengen
- Zuideinde

Former municipality of Loenen:

- Loenen (aan de Vecht)
- Loenersloot
- Mijnden
- Nieuwerhoek
- Nieuwersluis
- Nigtevecht
- Vreeland

Former municipality of Maarssen:

- Maarssen
- Maarssenbroek
- Maarsseveen
- Molenpolder
- Oud-Maarsseveen
- Oud-Zuilen
- Tienhoven

== Politics ==
=== Municipal council ===
After the 2026 local elections, the municipal council of Stichtse Vecht consisted of the following parties:

Political party	Seats
Lokaal Liberaal	10
GroenLinks / PvdA	5
D66	5
Streekbelangen	5
VVD	3
CDA	3
ChristenUnie-SGP	1
PVV	1
Total	33

Since 2020 the mayor has been Ap Reinders, who is not a member of any political party.

== Notable people ==
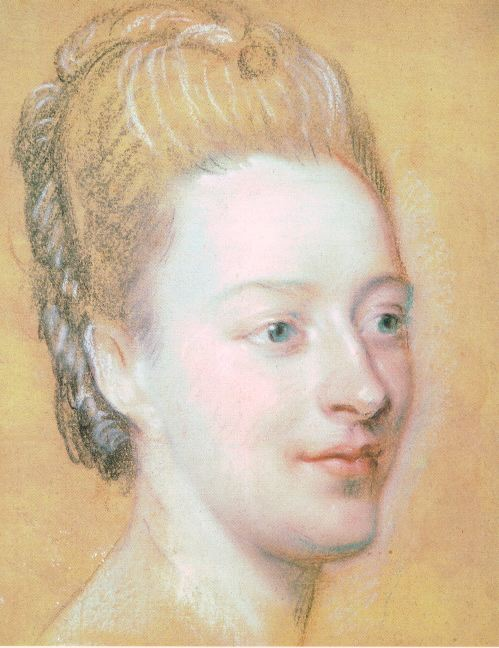
Isabelle de Charrière, 1771

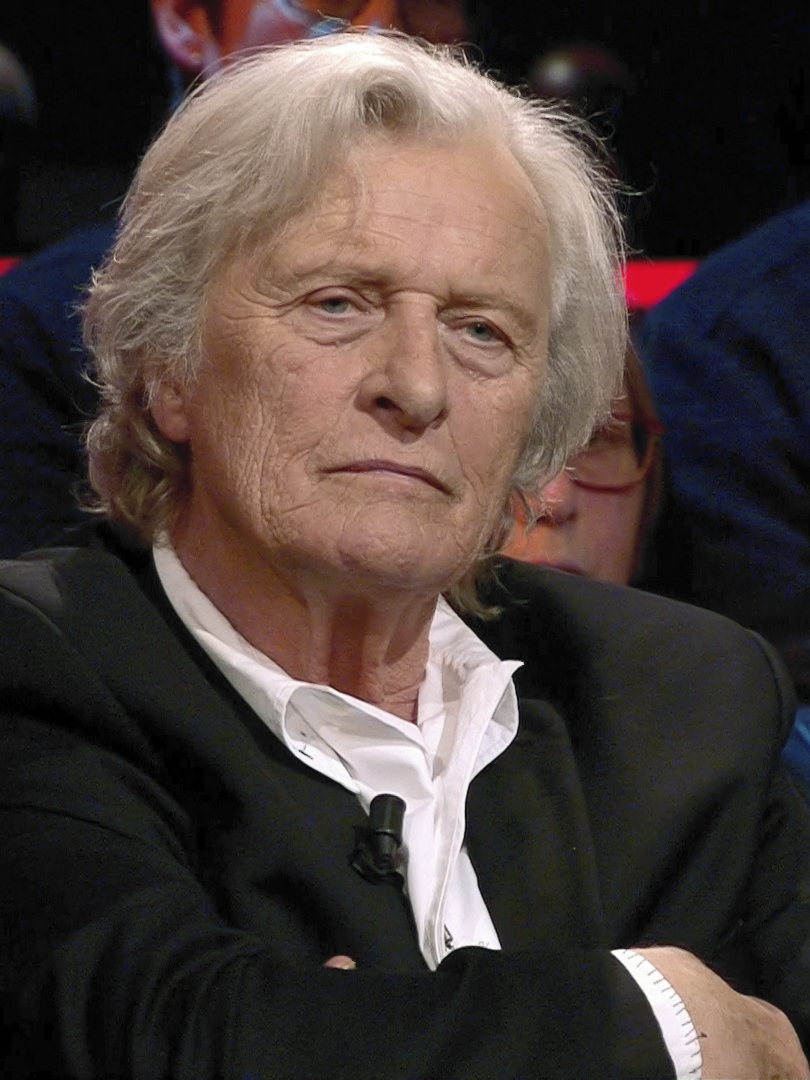
Rutger Hauer, 2018

=== The arts ===
- Willem Vrelant (?? in Vreeland – ca.1481) a book illuminator
- Constantijn à Renesse (1626 in Maarssen – 1680) a Dutch Golden Age painter
- Gerrit Zegelaar (1719 in Loenen aan de Vecht – 1794) a painter
- Isabelle de Charrière (1740 in Castle Zuylen – 1805) a writer of letters, novels, pamphlets, music and plays
- Nicolaas Bastert (1854 in Maarssen – 1939) a landscape painter
- Marjolein Bastin (born 1943 in Loenen aan de Vecht) a nature artist, writer, children's author and illustrator
- Rutger Hauer (1944 in Breukelen – 2019) an actor, writer and environmentalist
- Penney de Jager (born 1948) dancer and choreographer, lives in Stichtse Vecht
- Leoni Jansen (1955 in Leiden) a singer, stage-director and TV anchor-woman

=== Public thinking & public service ===
- Gerrit van Arkel (1858 in Loenen aan de Vecht – 1918) a Jugendstil (Art Nouveau) architect
- Aarnoud van Heemstra (1871 in Vreeland – 1957) a nobleman, jurist and politician.
- Pieter Nicolaas van Eyck (1887 in Breukelen – 1954) a foreign correspondent, poet, critic, essayist and philosopher
- Pierre Joseph Eyma (1903 in Maarssen – 1945) a botanist
- Annelien Kappeyne van de Coppello (1936 in Loenen aan de Vecht – 1990) a politician
- Sander Griffioen (born 1941 in Loenen aan de Vecht) a philosopher and academic
- Bernt Schneiders (born 1959 in Breukelen) a politician, Mayor of Landsmeer, Heemskerk & Haarlem
- Liesbeth Spies (born 1966 in Alphen aan den Rijn) a politician, Mayor of Alphen aan den Rijn
- Marianne Thieme (born 1972 in Ede) a politician, author, animal rights activist and jurist

=== Sport ===
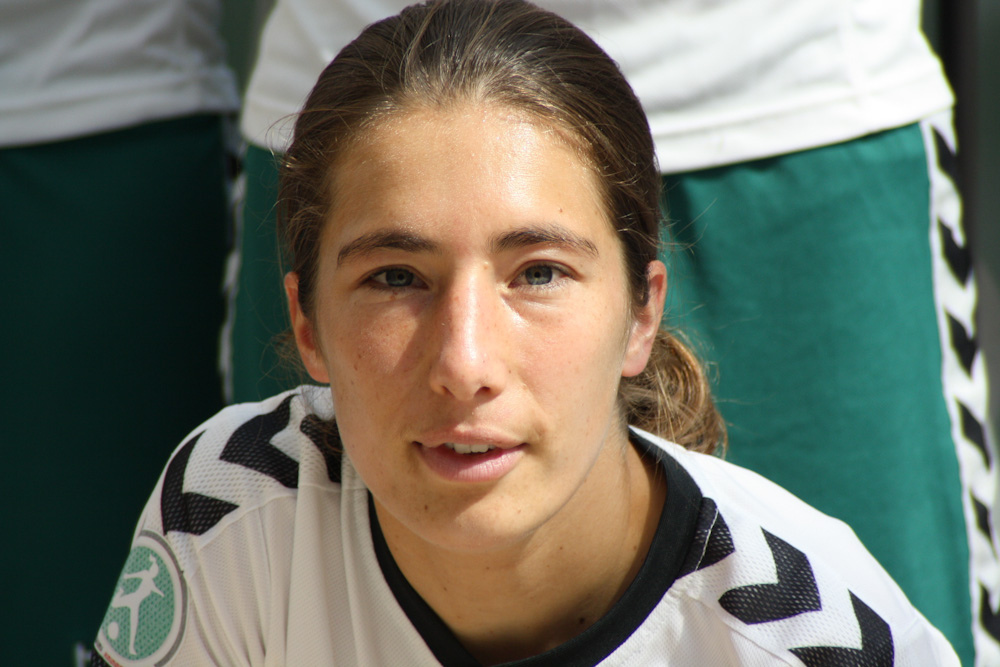
Annemieke Kiesel, 2010

- Cor Aalten (1913 in Breukelen-Nijenrode – 1991) a Dutch athlete, competed at the 1932 Summer Olympics
- Henk van der Grift (born 1935 in Breukelen) a retired Dutch speed skater, competed at the 1960 Winter Olympics
- Bart Verschoor (born 1965 in Loenersloot) a sailor, competed at the 1988 Summer Olympics
- Annemieke Kiesel (born 1979 in Kockengen) a former footballer and coach, also played for the Dutch national team, retiring with 156 caps
