= Kortrijk, Netherlands =

Kortrijk
- Hamlet
- Location in the Netherlands Kortrijk (Netherlands)
- Coordinates: 52.1588°N 4.9825°E
- Country: Netherlands
- Province: Utrecht
- Municipality: Stichtse Vecht

Area
  - Total: 4.87 km^{2} (1.88 sq mi)

Population (2021)
  - Total: 155
  - Density: 31.8/km^{2} (82.4/sq mi)
- Time zone: UTC+1 (CET)
  - Summer (DST): UTC+2 (CEST)
- Postal code: 3621
- Dialing code: 0346

Kortrijk is a hamlet in the Dutch province of Utrecht. It is a part of the municipality of Stichtse Vecht and lies about 10 km northwest of Utrecht.

The hamlet was first mentioned in 1217 as Kurtryke, and named after Kortrijk in Belgium. It likely began as a peat excavation colony in the 11th century. Postal authorities have placed Kortrijk under Breukelen. The hamlet does not have place name signs. In 1840, it had a population of 32 people.
