= Portengen =

- Hamlet
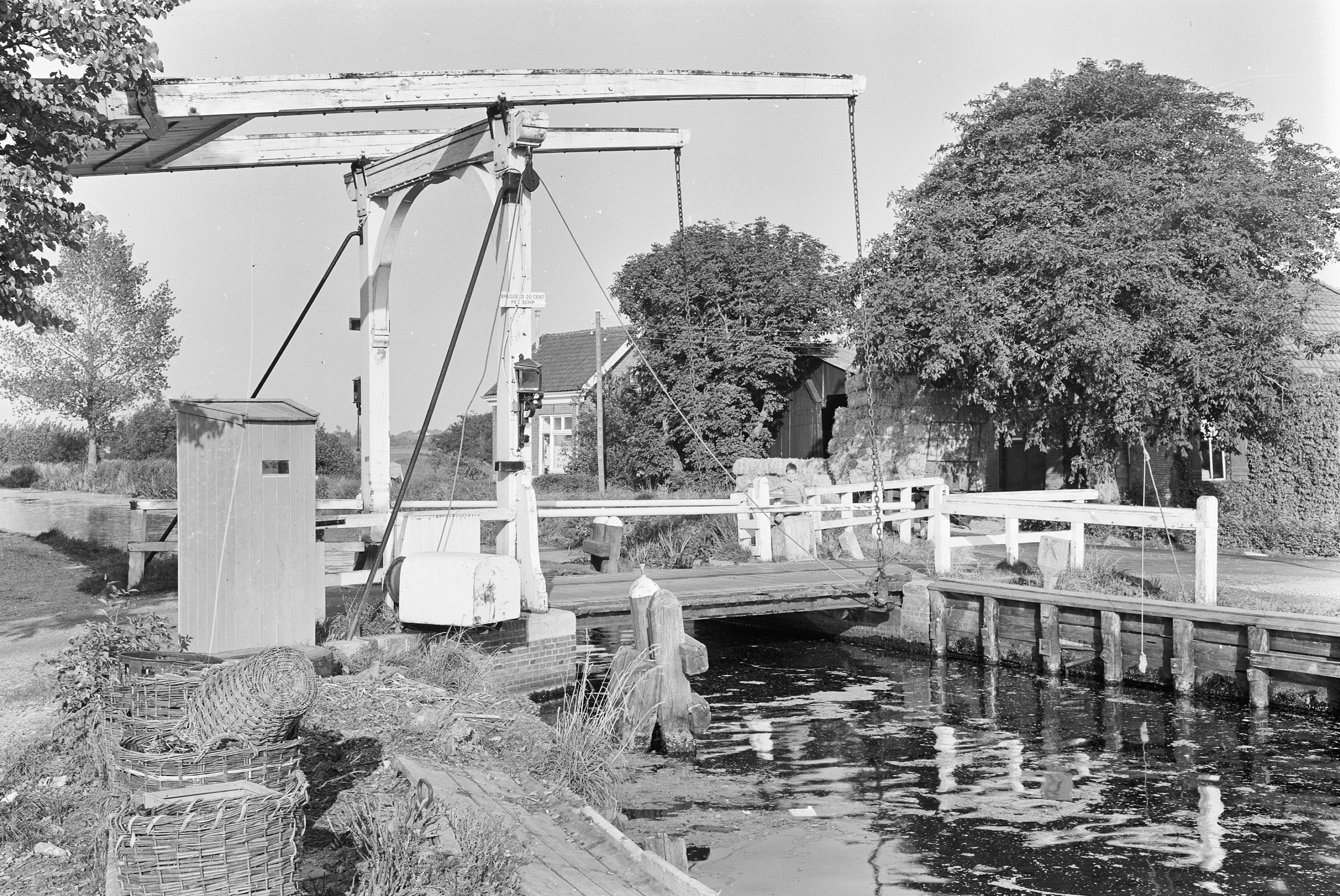

- Location in the Netherlands Portengen (Netherlands)
- Coordinates: 52°09′21″N 4°57′48″E
- Country: Netherlands
- Province: Utrecht
- Municipality: Stichtse Vecht

Area
  - Total: 6.87 km^{2} (2.65 sq mi)
- Elevation: −0.5 m (−1.6 ft)

Population (2021)
  - Total: 285
  - Density: 41.5/km^{2} (107/sq mi)
- Time zone: UTC+1 (CET)
  - Summer (DST): UTC+2 (CEST)
- Postal code: 3628
- Dialing code: 0346

Portengen is a hamlet in the Dutch province of Utrecht. It is located in the municipality of Stichtse Vecht, 1 km (0.62 mi) northeast of Kockengen.

Portengen was a separate municipality from 1818 to 1857, when it was merged with Breukelen-Nijenrode.

The hamlet was first mentioned in 1217 as Britannien, and is a reference to Brittany, France. It started as a peat excavation colony during the 11th and 12th century. The hamlet of Portengensebrug is an enclave within Portengen. In 1840, Portengen was home to 55 people.

== Gallery ==
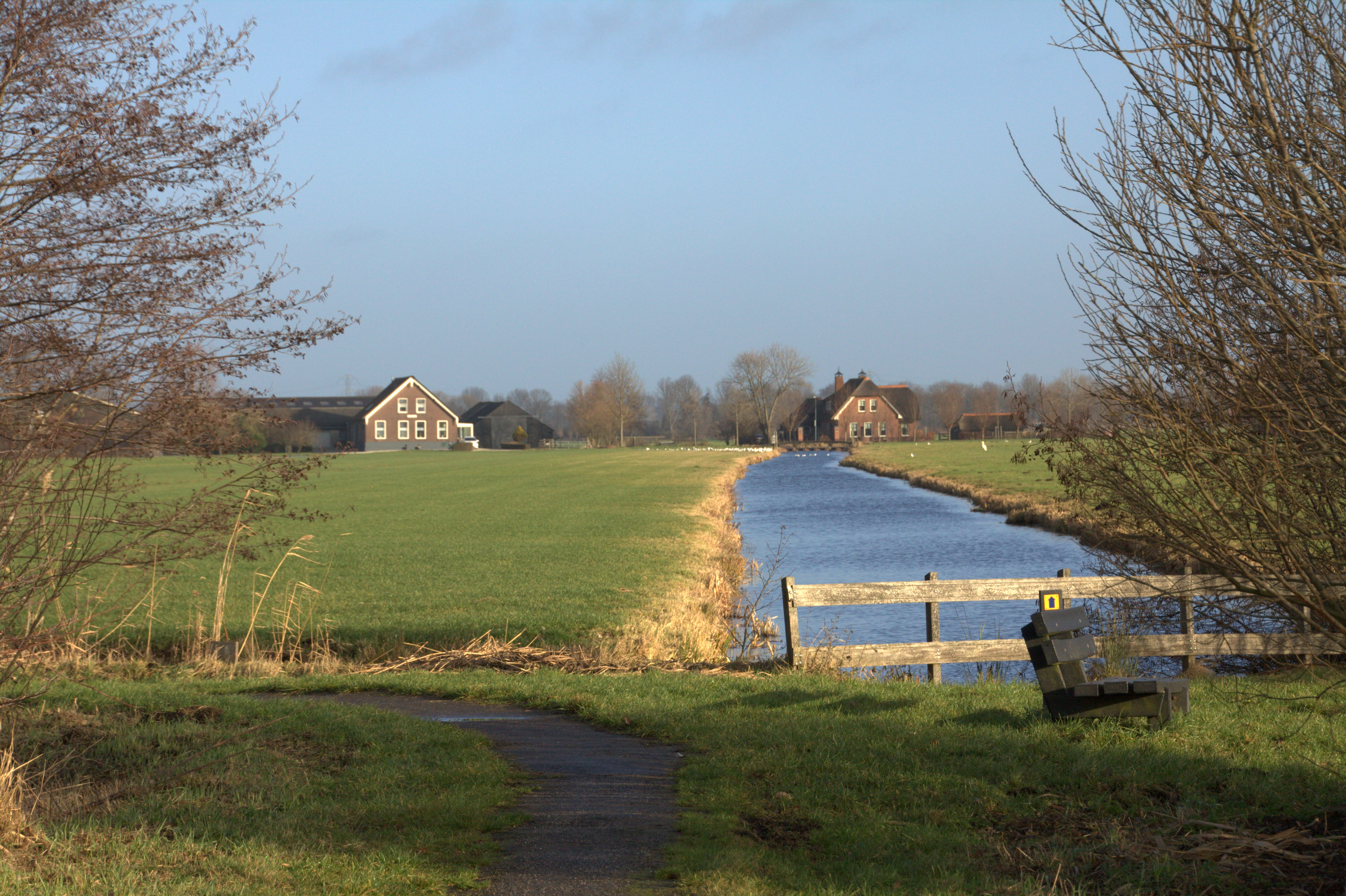
View on Portengensebrug

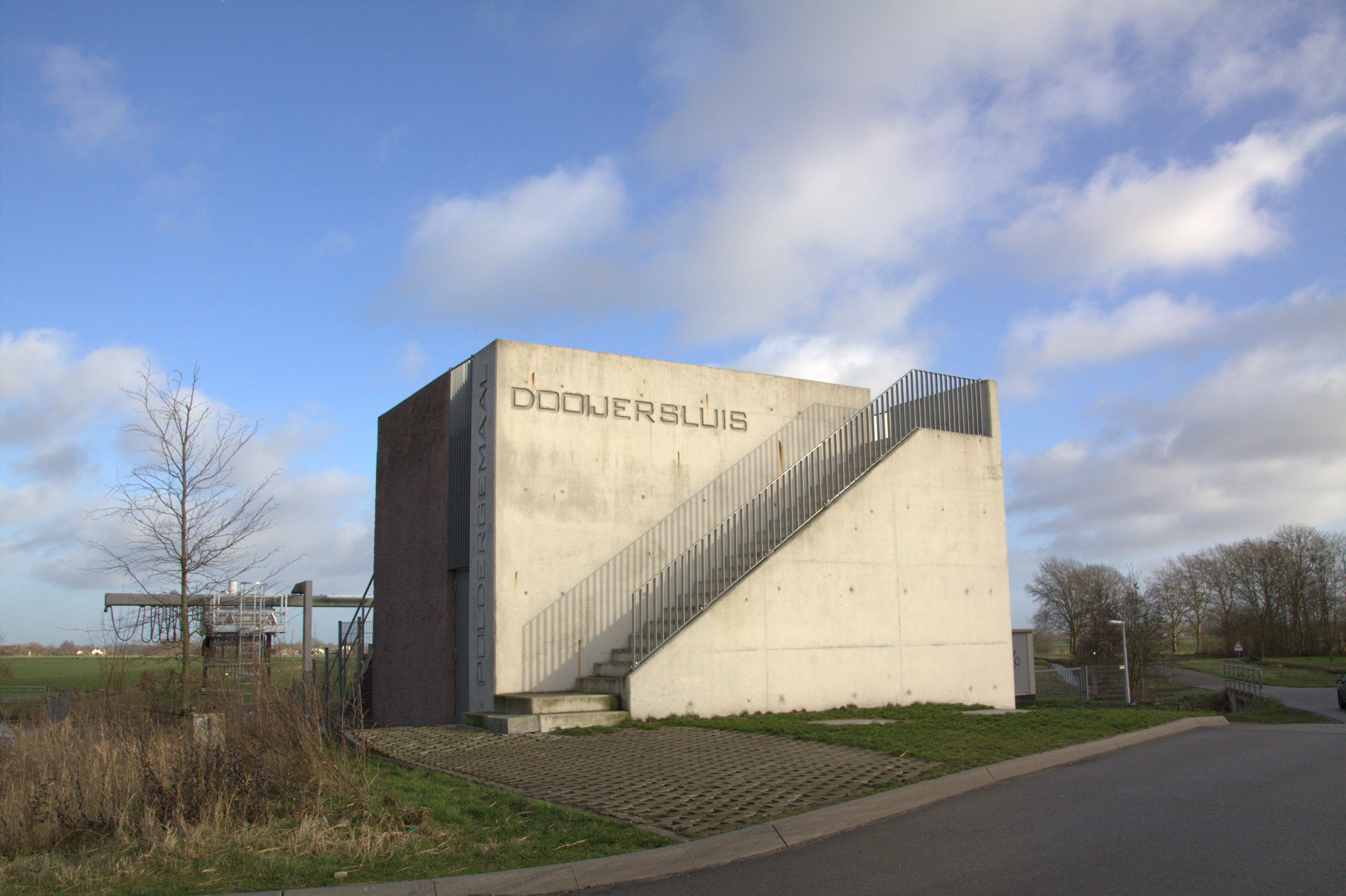
Pumping station Dooijersluis

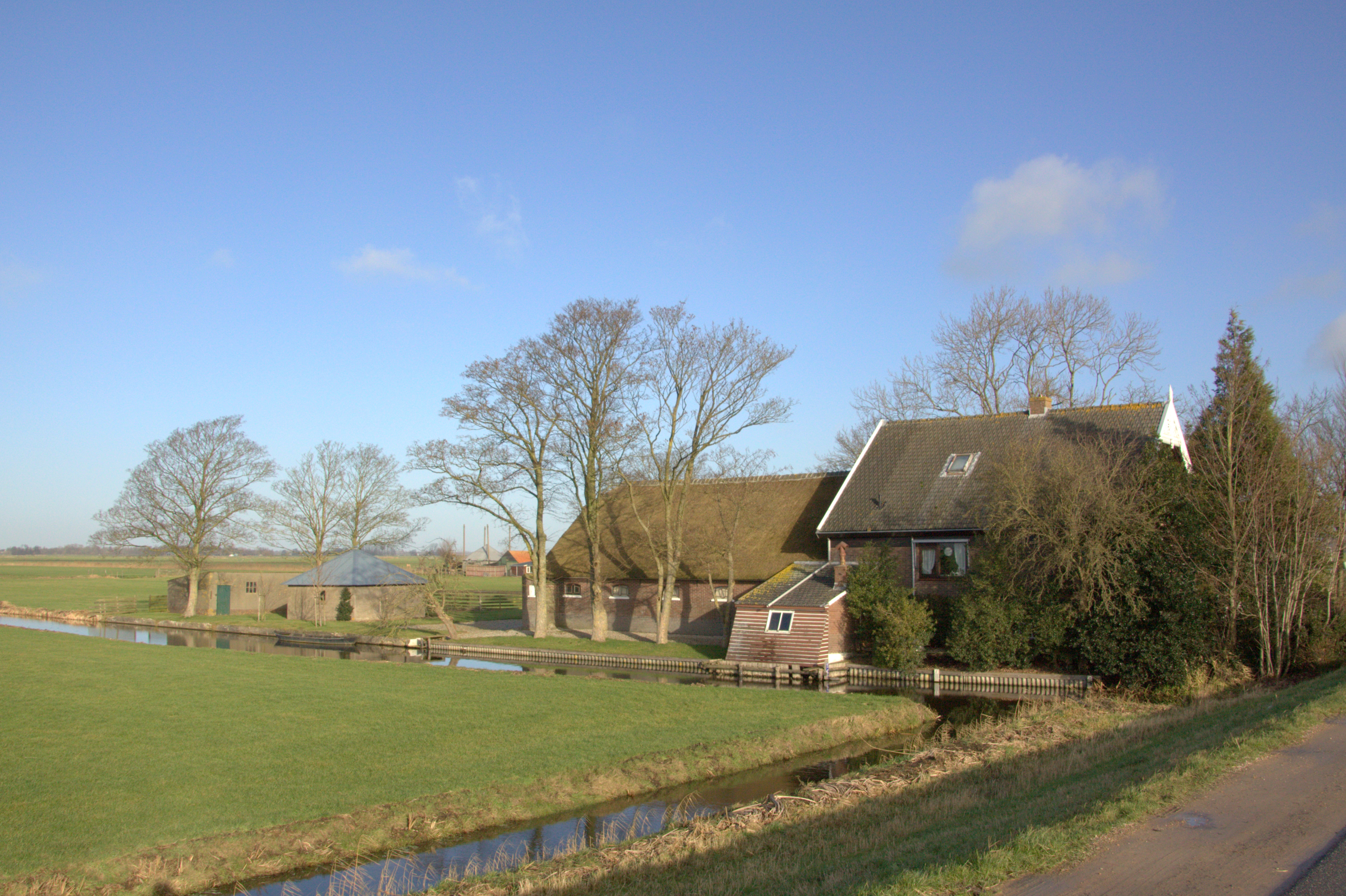
Farm in Portegen
