= Maarsseveen =

- (Oud-)Maarsseveen in the former municipality of Maarssen
- Coordinates: 52°8′27″N 5°4′25″E
- Country: Netherlands
- Province: Utrecht
- Municipality: Stichtse Vecht

Maarsseveen is a former hamlet in the Dutch province of Utrecht. It was located on the east bank of the Vecht River, opposite the village of Maarssen, and has now been completely absorbed by that town. Since 2011 they form part of the municipality of Stichtse Vecht.

From 1815 to 1949, Maarsseveen was a separate municipality. Apart from the hamlet itself, the municipality covered the polder Maarsseveen, and the hamlet of Oud-Maarsseveen.
