= Loenen =

- Former municipality
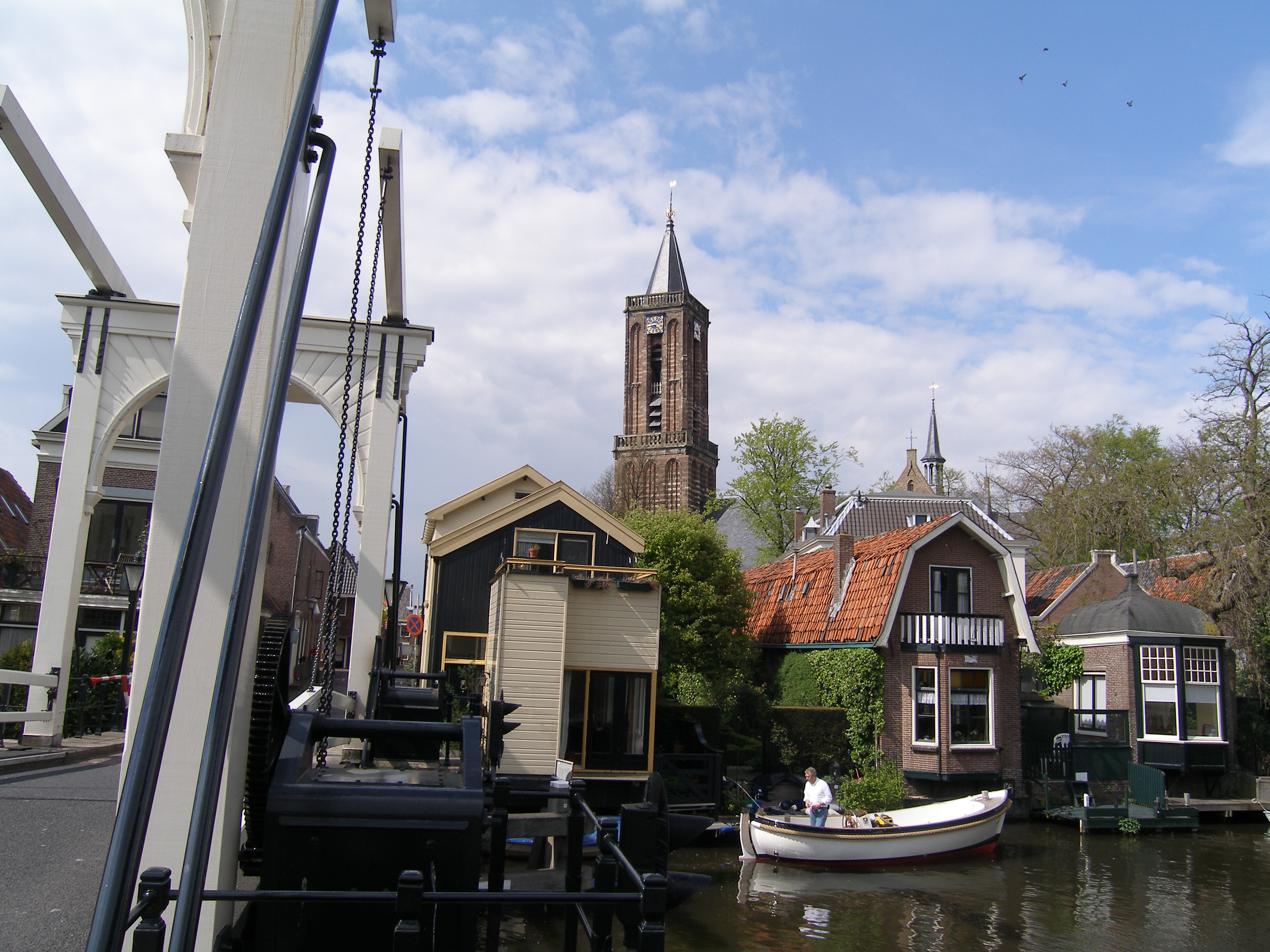
- Loenen aan de Vecht

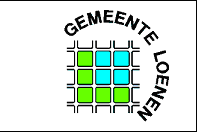
- Flag Coat of arms

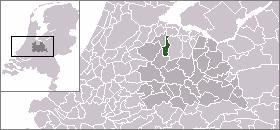
- Coordinates: 52°13′N 5°1′E
- Country: Netherlands
- Province: Utrecht
- Municipality: Stichtse Vecht

Area (2006)
  - Total: 27.32 km^{2} (10.55 sq mi)
  - Land: 25.00 km^{2} (9.65 sq mi)
  - Water: 2.32 km^{2} (0.90 sq mi)

Population (1 January 2007)
  - Total: 8,222
  - Density: 329/km^{2} (850/sq mi)
- Source: CBS, Statline.
- Time zone: UTC+1 (CET)
  - Summer (DST): UTC+2 (CEST)
- Website: www.loenen.nl

Loenen (Dutch pronunciation: [ˈlunə(n)]) is a former municipality in the Netherlands, in the province of Utrecht. It was in the Vechtstreek area. On January 1, 2011, Loenen merged with Breukelen and Maarssen to form Stichtse Vecht.

== Population centres ==
The former municipality of Loenen consisted of the following cities, towns, villages and districts:

- Loenen (aan de Vecht) (main town)
- Loenersloot
- Mijnden
- Nieuwerhoek
- Nieuwersluis
- Nigtevecht
- Vreeland

== History ==
The earliest traceable mention of the game of golf refers to a game played in Loenen aan de Vecht. In his book Early Golf, Steven van Hengel describes how the game of "Colf" or "Kolf" was played in 1297 near the castle of Kronenburg. The players had to hit the castle door in as few strikes as possible from the Court House by hitting a ball with a stick.
