= Mijnden =

- Hamlet
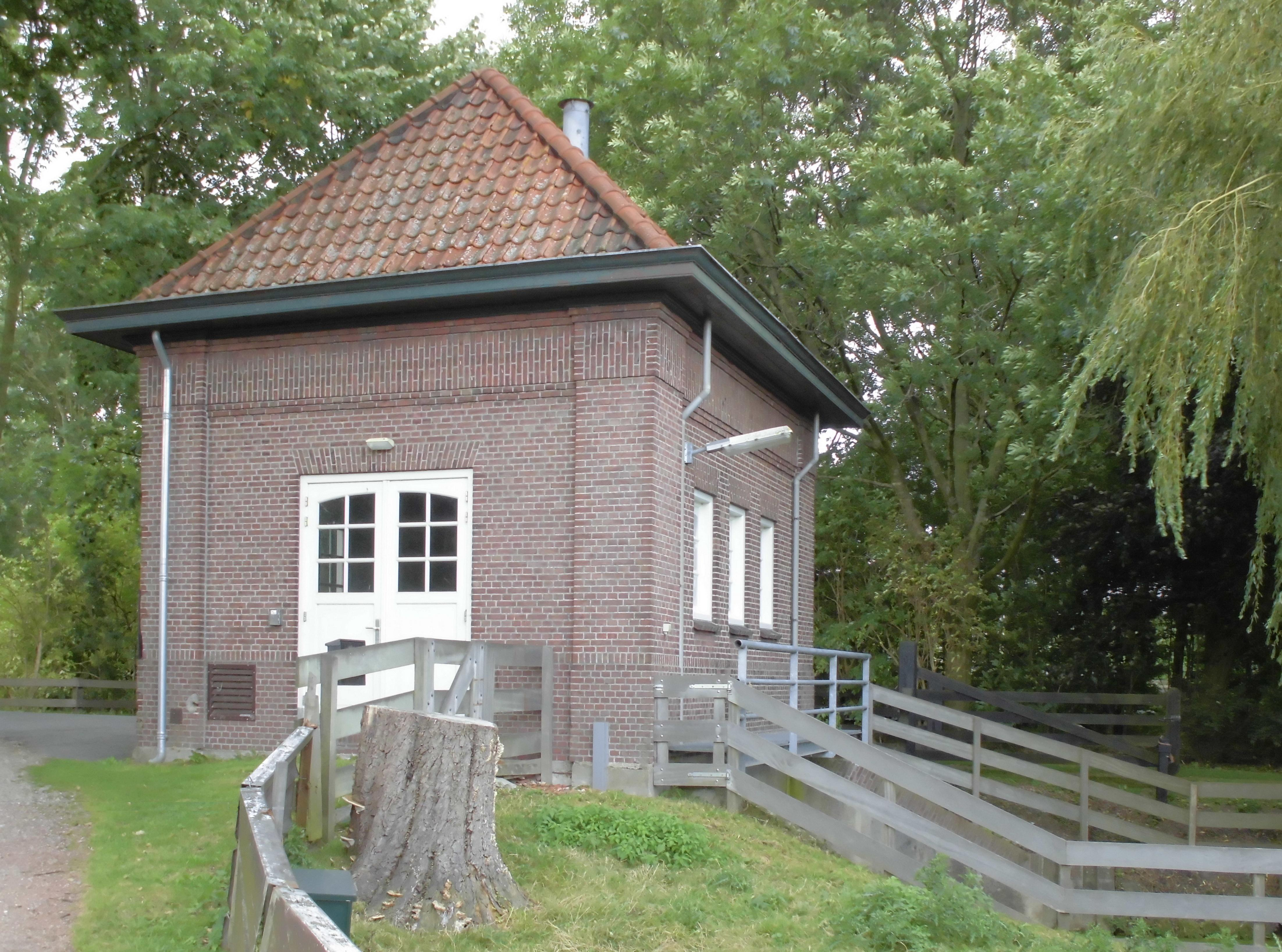
- Pumping station in Mijnden

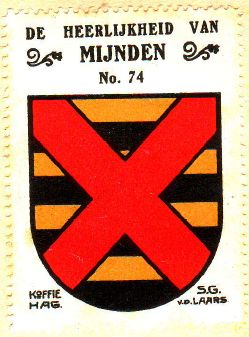
- Coat of arms

- Location in the Netherlands Mijnden (Netherlands)
- Coordinates: 52°12′N 5°1′E
- Country: Netherlands
- Province: Utrecht
- Municipality: Stichtse Vecht

Area
  - Total: 2.77 km^{2} (1.07 sq mi)

Population (2021)
  - Total: 90
  - Density: 32/km^{2} (84/sq mi)
- Time zone: UTC+1 (CET)
  - Summer (DST): UTC+2 (CEST)
- Postal code: 3631
- Dialing code: 0294

Mijnden is a hamlet in the Dutch province of Utrecht. It was a part of the former municipality of Loenen. Since 2011 it has made part of the new formed municipality of Stichtse Vecht and lies about 12 km west of Hilversum.

The hamlet was first mentioned in 1235 as Minden. The etymology is unclear. The postal authorities have placed it under Nieuwersluis. In 1840, it was home to 270 people.
