= Janneke Vos =

Dutch racing cyclist (born 1977)

Personal information
- Full name: Janneke Vos
- Born: March 20, 1977 (age 49) Kockengen, the Netherlands

Cycling career
- Sport: Cycling
- Disciplines: Road & track
- Role: Rider

Professional teams
- 1995–1997: Libertas - Technogym
- 1998: The Greenery
- 1999: Rabobank
- 2000–2002: Ondernemers van Nature
- 2003: @Home
- 2004–2006: Therme Skin Care

Janneke Vos (born 20 March 1977) was a Dutch professional racing cyclist from Kockengen, Netherlands.

== Palmarès ==
2000
3rd Points race, Dutch National Track Championships

2005
1st (Netherlands) Dutch National Road Race Championships
