= Oukoop, Utrecht =

Oukoop
- Hamlet
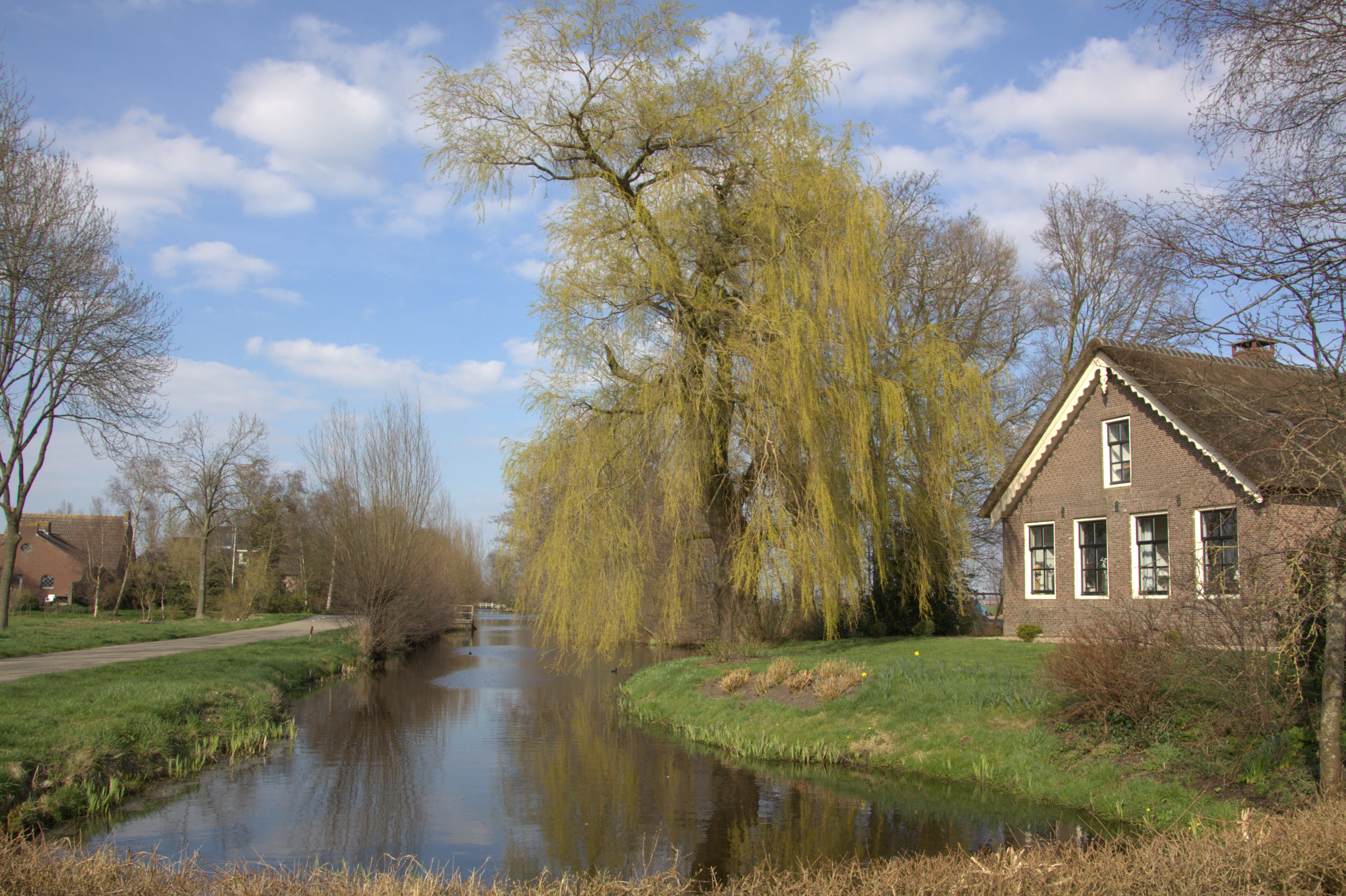
- Farm in Oukoop

- Location in the Netherlands Oukoop (Netherlands)
- Coordinates: 52.20299°N 4.97475°E
- Country: Netherlands
- Province: Utrecht
- Municipality: Stichtse Vecht

Area
  - Total: 7.51 km^{2} (2.90 sq mi)

Population (2021)
  - Total: 250
  - Density: 33/km^{2} (86/sq mi)
- Time zone: UTC+1 (CET)
  - Summer (DST): UTC+2 (CEST)
- Postal code: 3626
- Dialing code: 0294

Oukoop is a hamlet in the Dutch province of Utrecht. It is a part of the municipality of Stichtse Vecht, and lies about 14 km west of Hilversum.

The hamlet was first mentioned in 1217 as Aldencoep, and means "old (peat) concession". In 1840, Oukoop was home to 111 people.
