= Oud-Maarsseveen =

- Hamlet
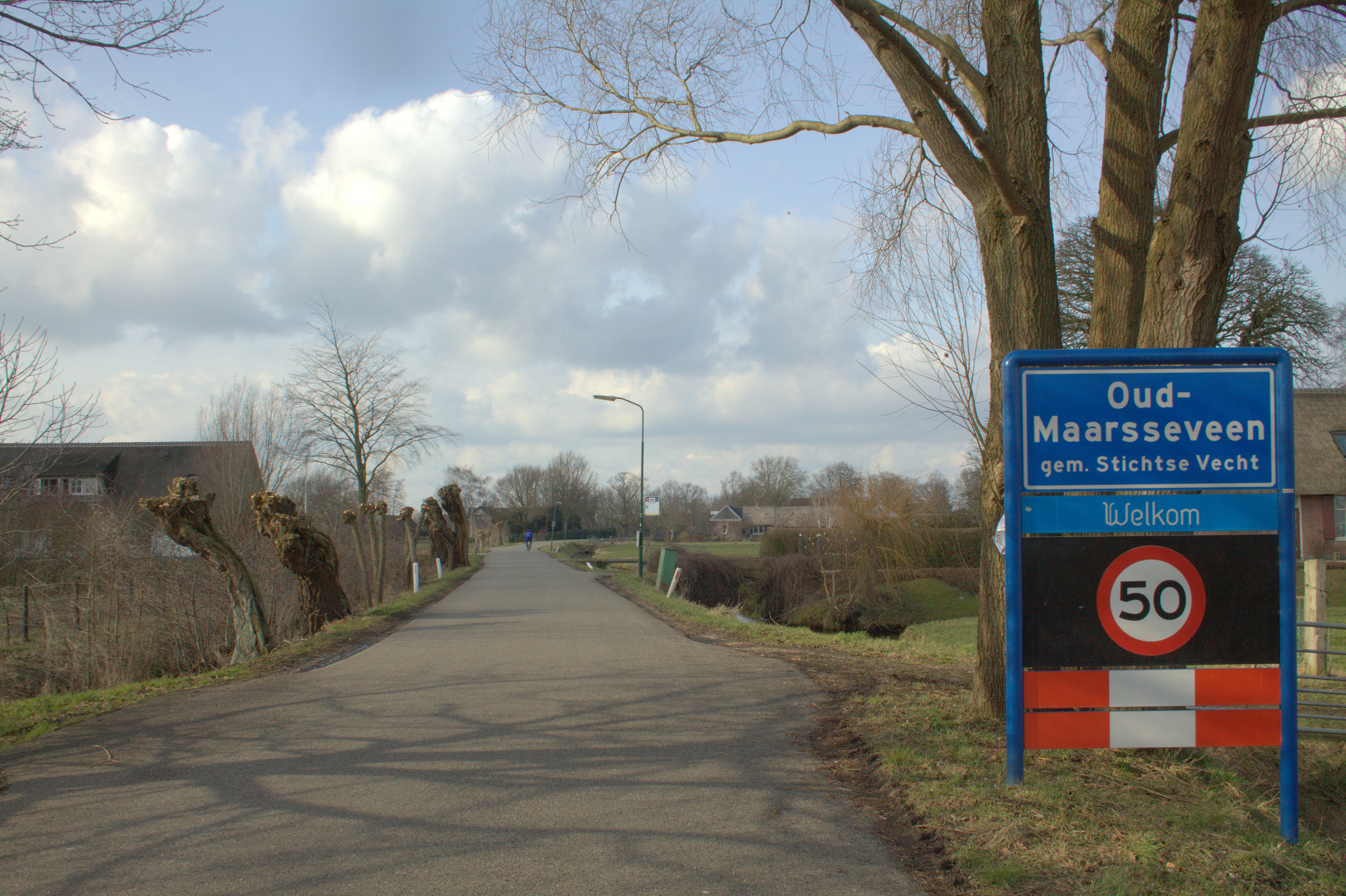
- Welcome to Oud-Maarsseveen

- Location in the Netherlands Oud-Maarsseveen (Netherlands)
- Coordinates: 52°9′31″N 5°5′20″E
- Country: Netherlands
- Province: Utrecht
- Municipality: Stichtse Vecht

Area
  - Total: 4.23 km^{2} (1.63 sq mi)

Population (2021)
  - Total: 675
  - Density: 160/km^{2} (413/sq mi)
- Time zone: UTC+1 (CET)
  - Summer (DST): UTC+2 (CEST)
- Postal code: 3612
- Dialing code: 0346

Oud-Maarsseveen is a hamlet in the Dutch province of Utrecht. It is a part of the municipality of Stichtse Vecht, and lies about 7 km north of Utrecht.

The hamlet was first mentioned around 1200 as Marsenrevene, and means "moorland belonging to Maarssen". The oud (old) was later added to distinguish from Maarsseveen. Oud-Maarsseveen has place name signs. The hamlet started as a land cultivation project. It was home to 507 in 1840.

== Gallery ==
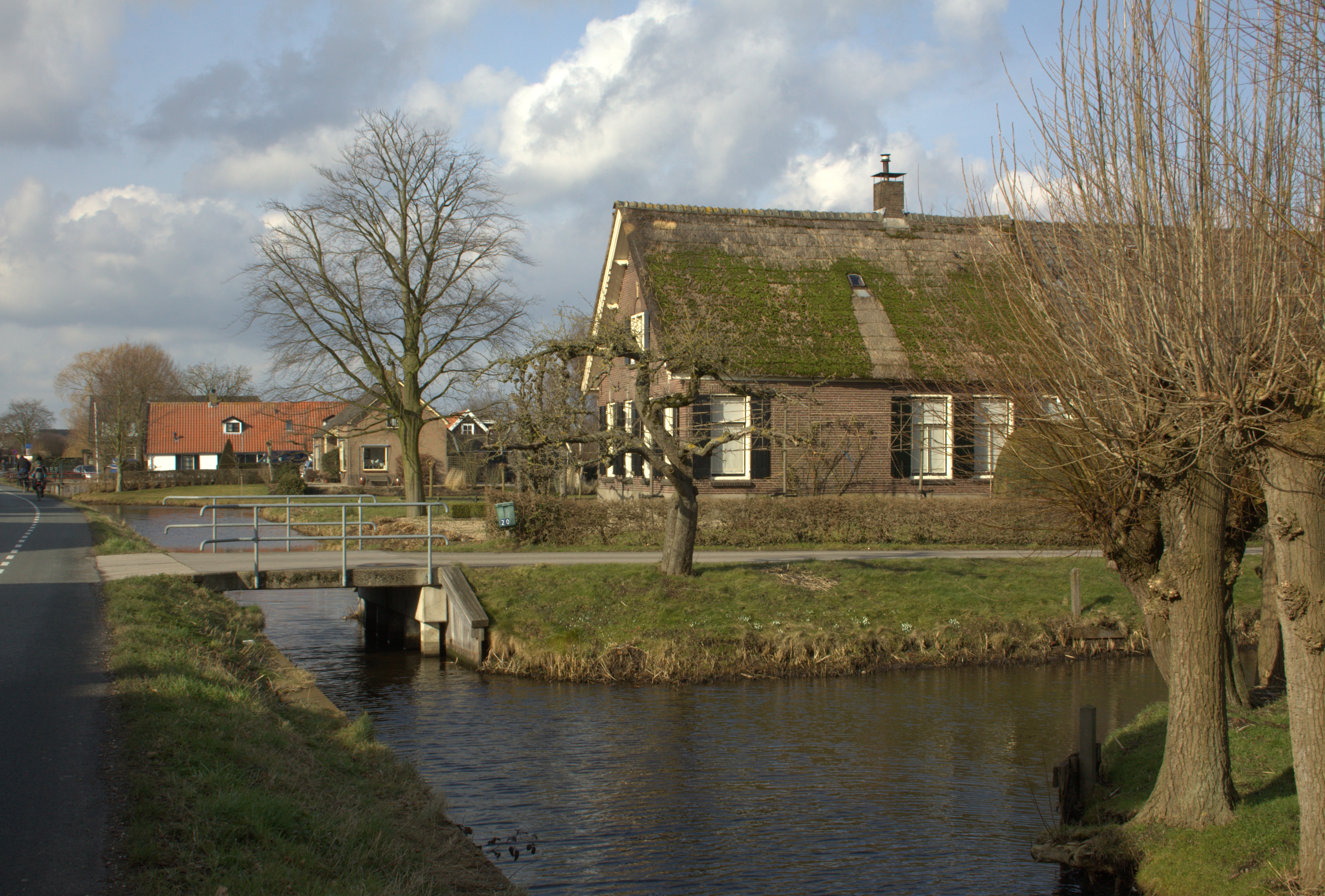
Farm in Oud-Maarsseveen

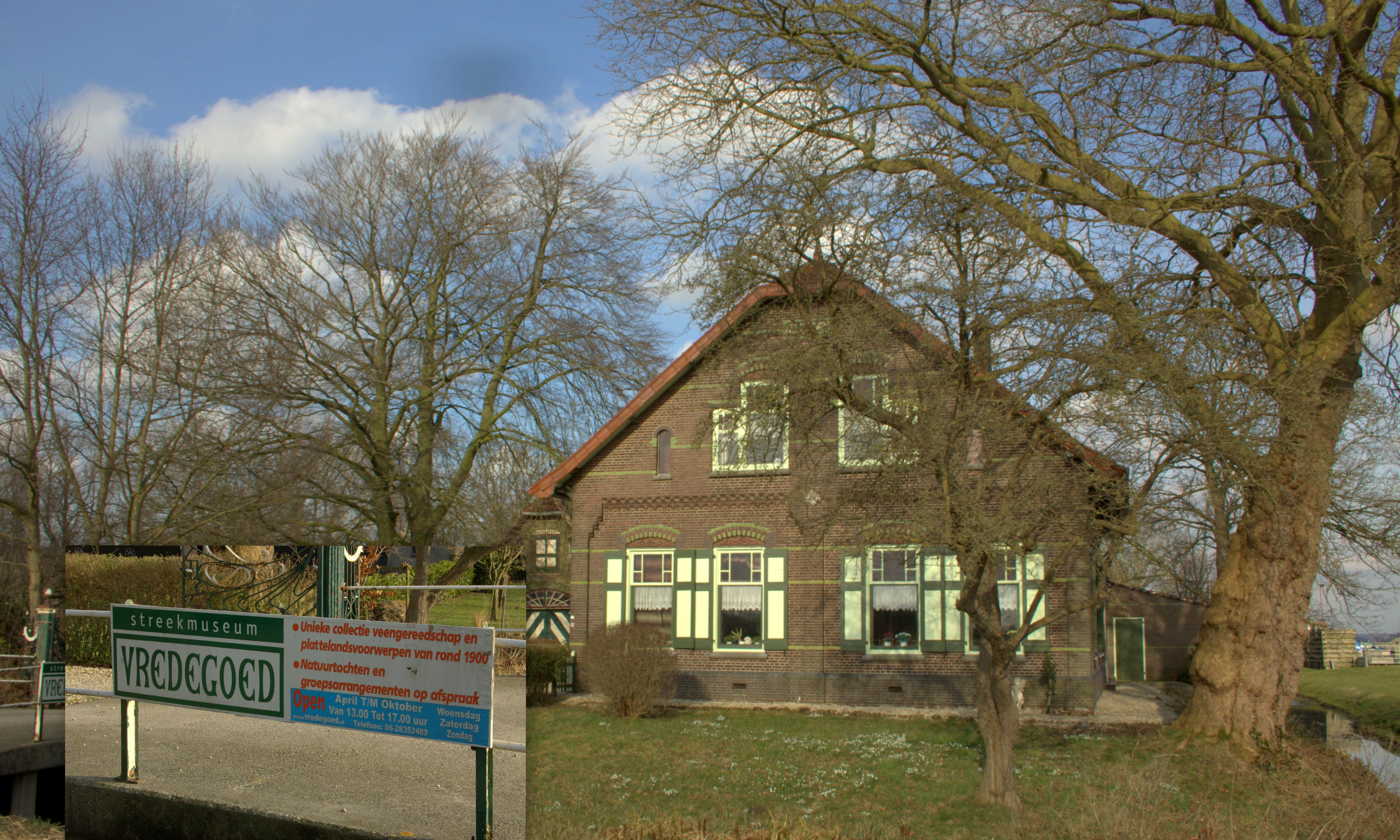
Farm / museum in Oud-Maarsseveen
