= Breukelen-Nijenrode =

Coordinates: 52°10′N 5°00′E

Breukelen-Nijenrode is a former municipality in the Dutch province of Utrecht. The municipality was formed in 1815, when the municipality of Breukelen was split into two parts. Breukelen-Nijenrode covered the western part of the former municipality, including the center of the village of Breukelen itself. It was named after the Kasteel Nijenrode, which lies south of the village.

In 1949, the municipalities of Breukelen-Nijenrode and Breukelen-Sint Pieters merged again, to form the municipality of Breukelen.
