= Tienhoven, Stichtse Vecht =

Tienhoven
- Village
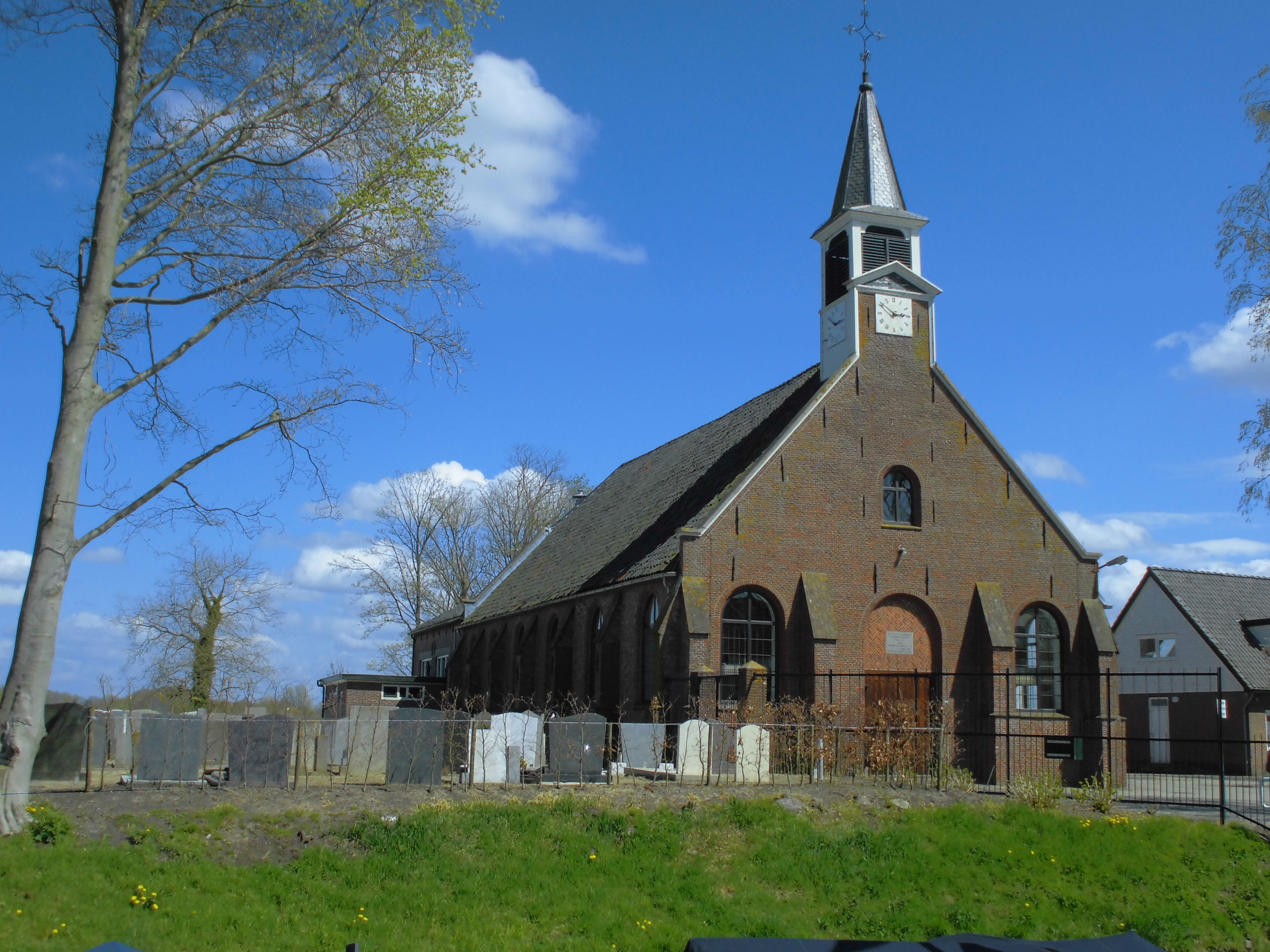
- Church of Tienhoven

- Location in the Netherlands Tienhoven (Netherlands)
- Coordinates: 52°10′9″N 5°4′51″E
- Country: Netherlands
- Province: Utrecht
- Municipality: Stichtse Vecht

Area
  - Total: 13.35 km^{2} (5.15 sq mi)
- Elevation: −1.8 m (−5.9 ft)

Population (2021)
  - Total: 1,775
  - Density: 133.0/km^{2} (344.4/sq mi)
- Time zone: UTC+1 (CET)
  - Summer (DST): UTC+2 (CEST)
- Postal code: 3612
- Dialing code: 0346

Tienhoven is a village in the Dutch province of Utrecht. It is a part of the municipality of Stichtse Vecht, and lies about 7 km (4.3 mi) north of Utrecht.

Tienhoven was a separate municipality until 1957, when it was merged with Maarssen.

The village was first mentioned in 1243 as "decem mansorum sitorum in Marsenvene", and means "ten parcels of land (in the moorland of Maarssen)" which were sold by Herman van Maarssen to the chapter of Saint Peter. Tienhoven started as a peat excavation village to the east of the Vecht River. In 1812, the church, the clergy house and nine other houses burnt down. In 1813, a new church was rebuilt. In 1840, it was home to 346 people. On 14 May 1940, after the German invasion, the land was inundated and the villagers were evacuated to Twisk. They returned after the capitulation on 20 May, and were able to pump the water away thereby limiting the damage caused.

== Gallery ==
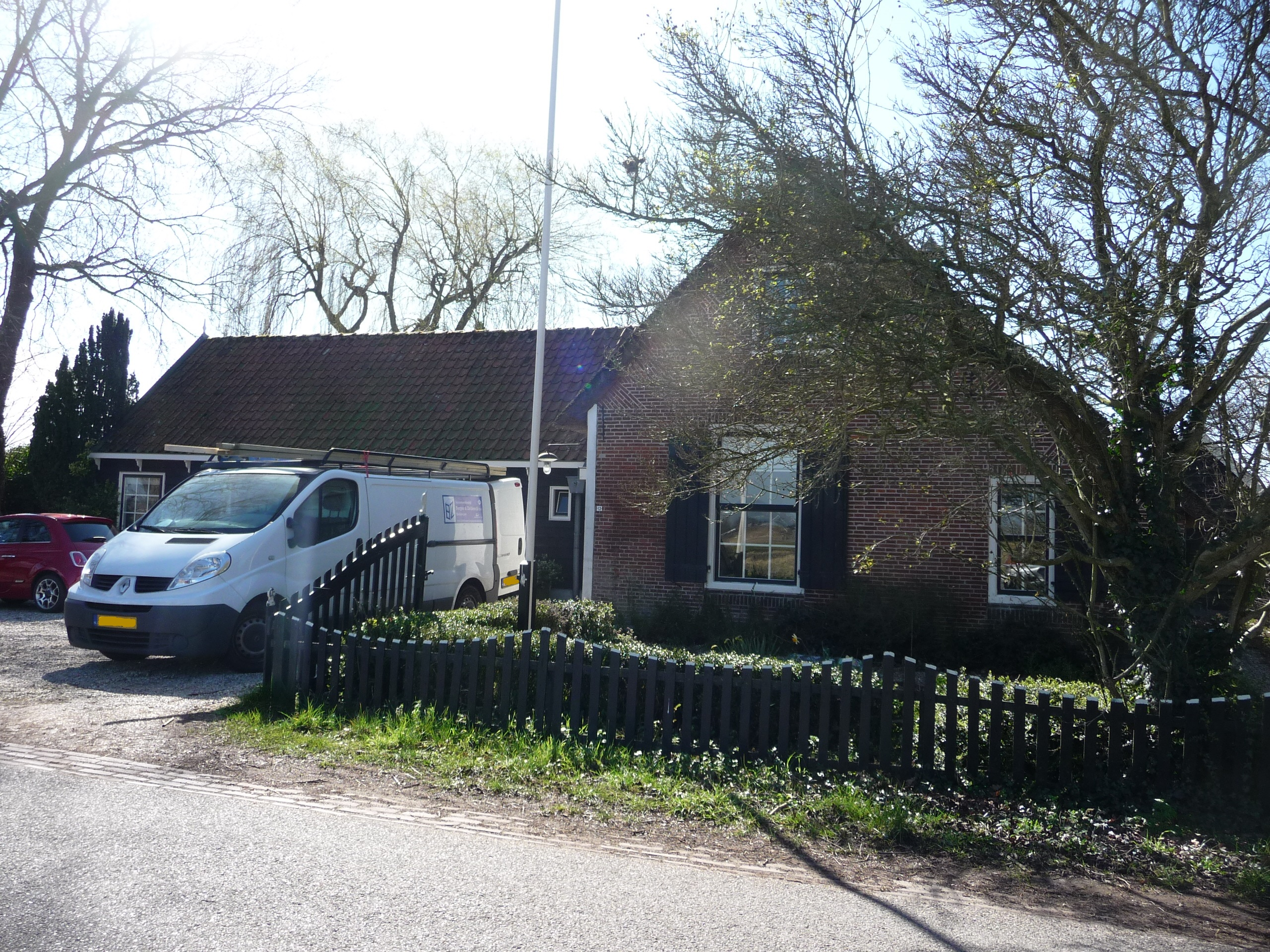
Farm in Tienhoven

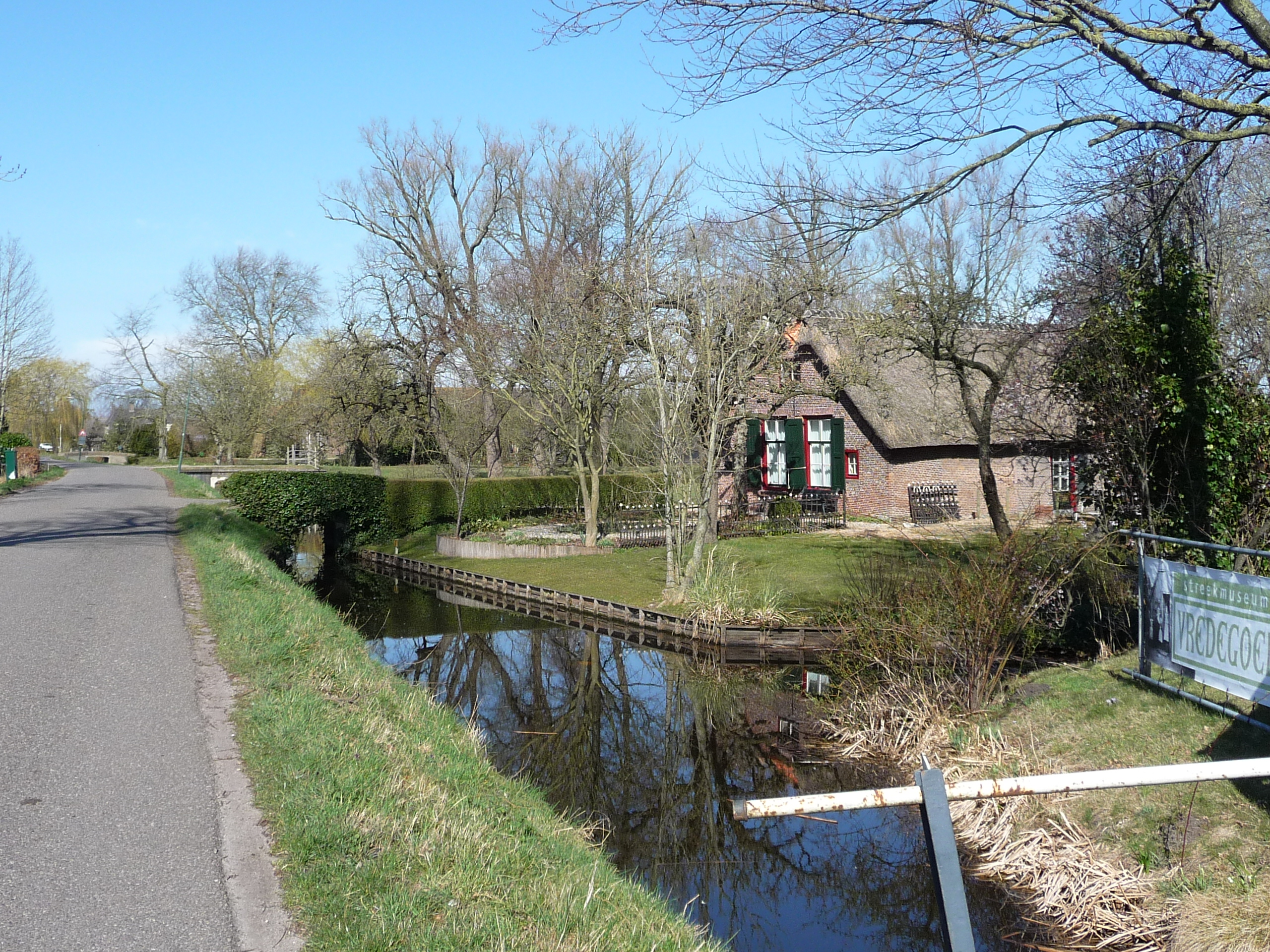
Street view

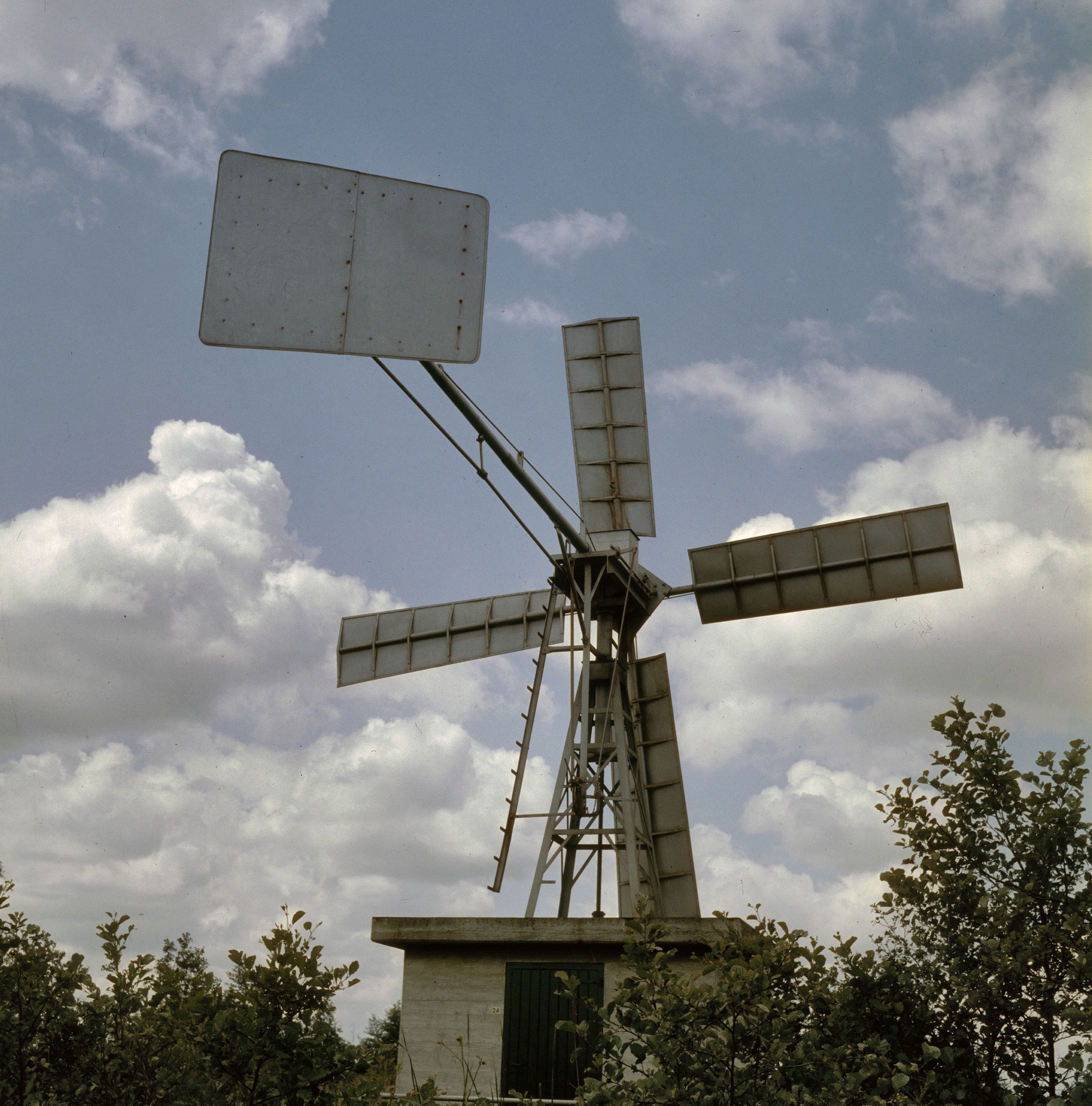
Former iron wind mill De Trouwe Waghter

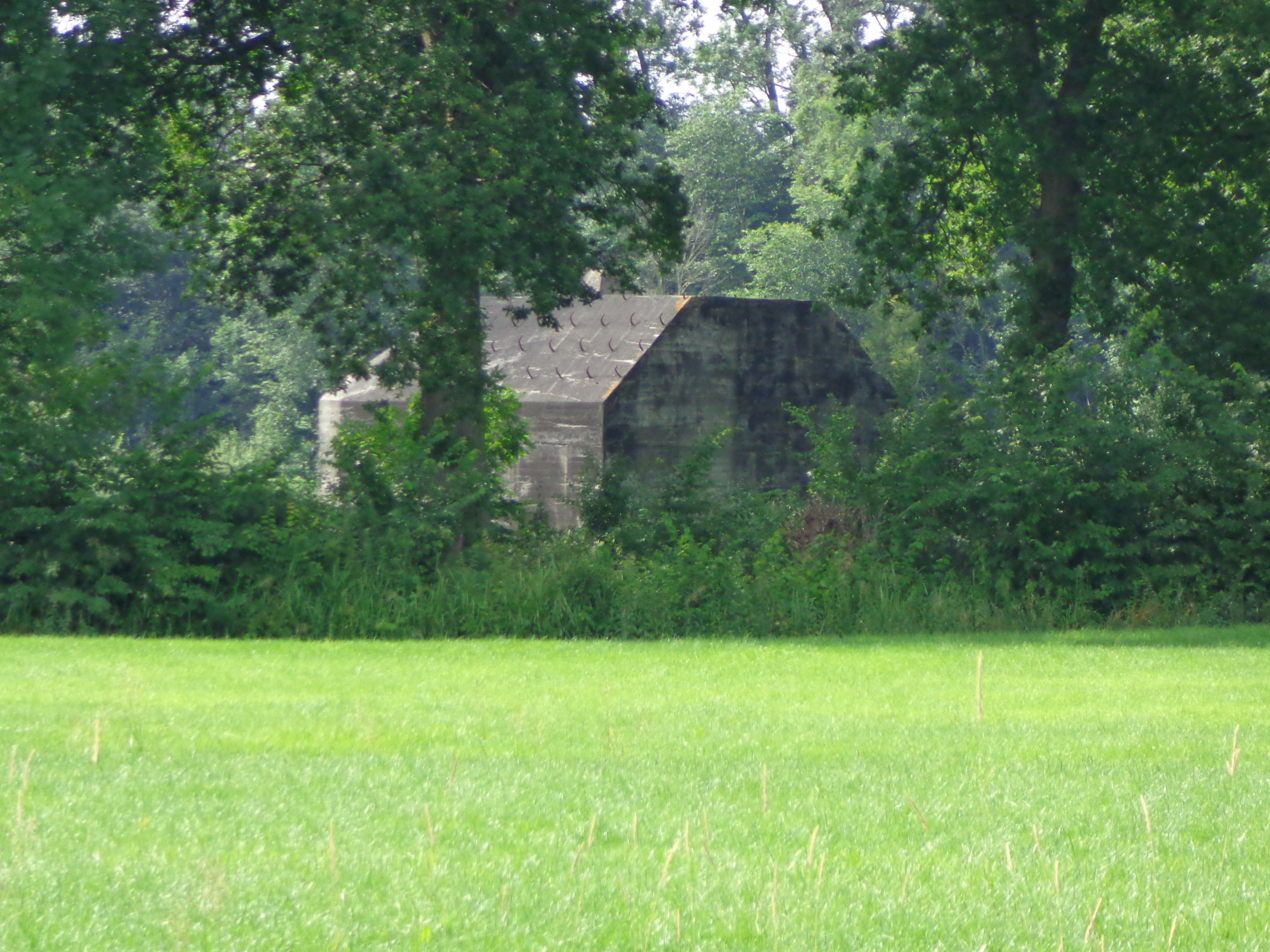
Partially hidden World War II bunker
