= Kockengen =

- Village
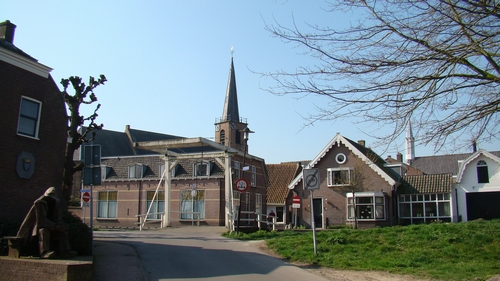

- Flag Coat of arms

- Location in the Netherlands Kockengen (Netherlands)
- Coordinates: 52°9′6″N 4°57′8″E
- Country: Netherlands
- Province: Utrecht
- Municipality: Stichtse Vecht

Area
  - Total: 19.47 km^{2} (7.52 sq mi)
- Elevation: −0.5 m (−1.6 ft)

Population (2021)
  - Total: 3,445
  - Density: 176.9/km^{2} (458.3/sq mi)
- Time zone: UTC+1 (CET)
  - Summer (DST): UTC+2 (CEST)
- Postal code: 3628
- Dialing code: 0346

Kockengen is a village in the Dutch province of Utrecht. It is a part of the municipality of Stichtse Vecht, and lies about 11 km northeast of Woerden.

The name of the village is a reference to Cockaigne, a medieval fictional land of plenty.

Until 1989, Kockengen was a separate municipality. From then until 2011 it was part of the municipality of Breukelen.

== History ==
The village was first mentioned around 1307 as Cokanghen. It started in the 12th-century as a cultivation concession, and the name was probably chosen to attract farmers. Many of the early settlers were serfs from France. In the 14th century a church was built. The tower dates from 1635. During the 17th century, it was a prosperous village, due to good water connections to Amsterdam and Utrecht. In 1840, Kockengen was home to 677 people.

The Kockengense Molen is a polder mill, a pumping station to drain the excess water from the polder, which was constructed in 1653. In 1675, it was redesigned. The wind mill remained in service until 1962 when it was replaced by an electric pumping station, however it still serves as an emergency backup.

== Gallery ==
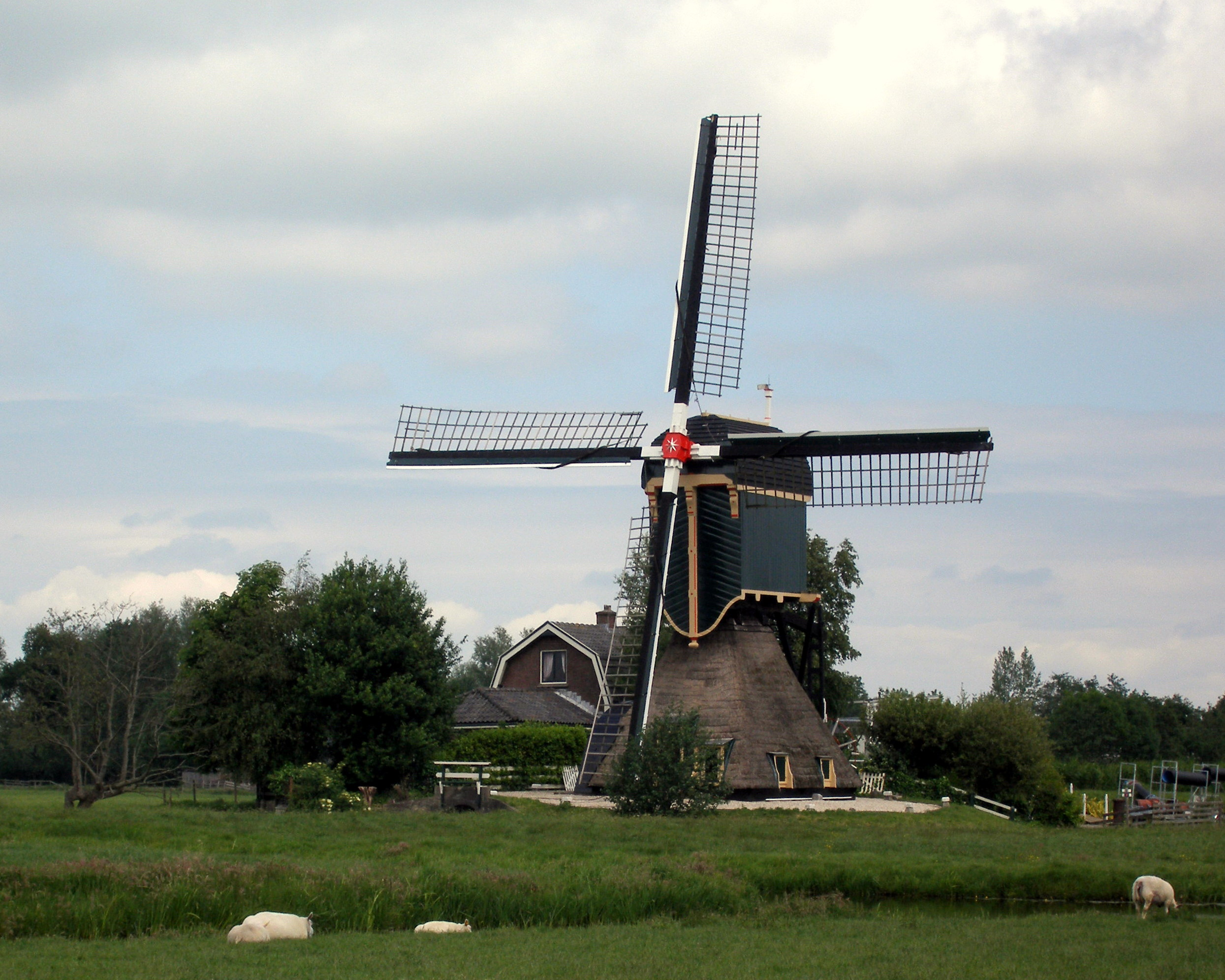
Windmill in Kockengen (built 1653)

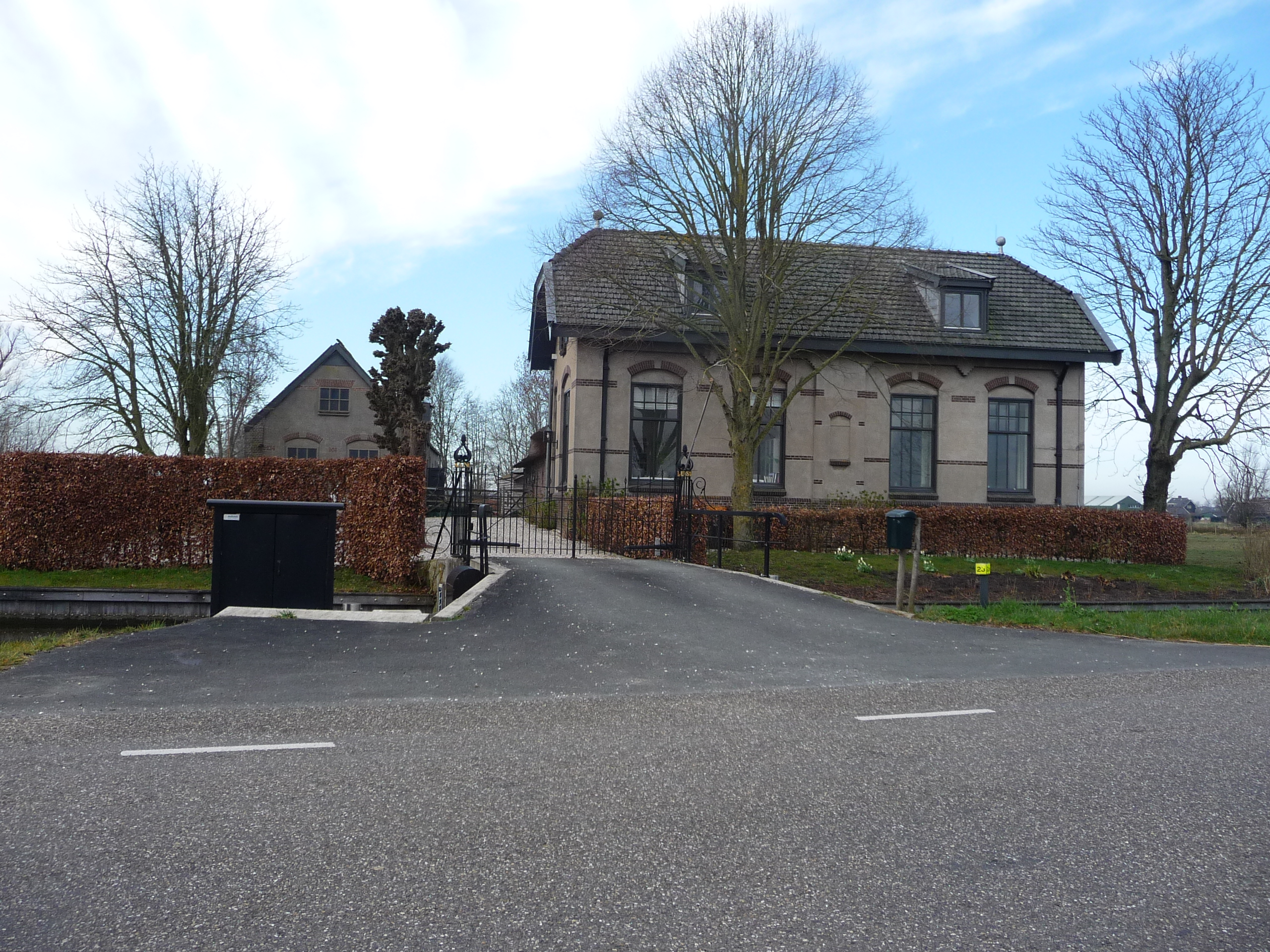
Farm in Kockengen

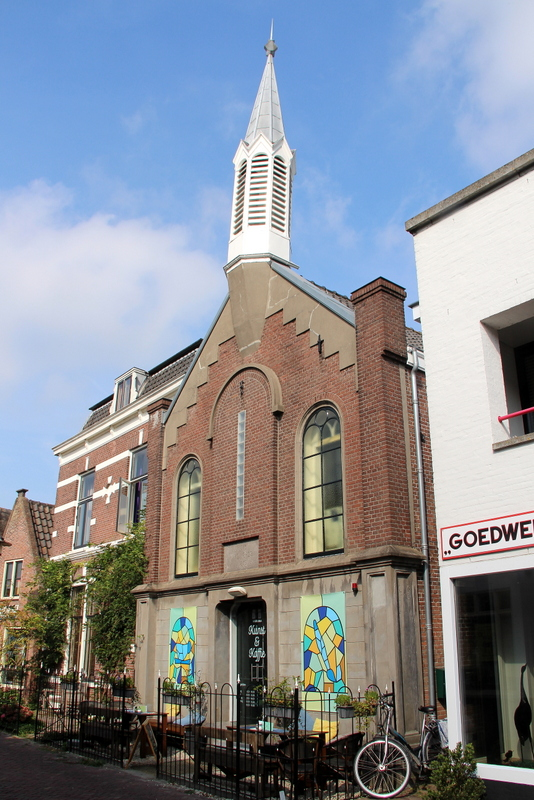
Former church

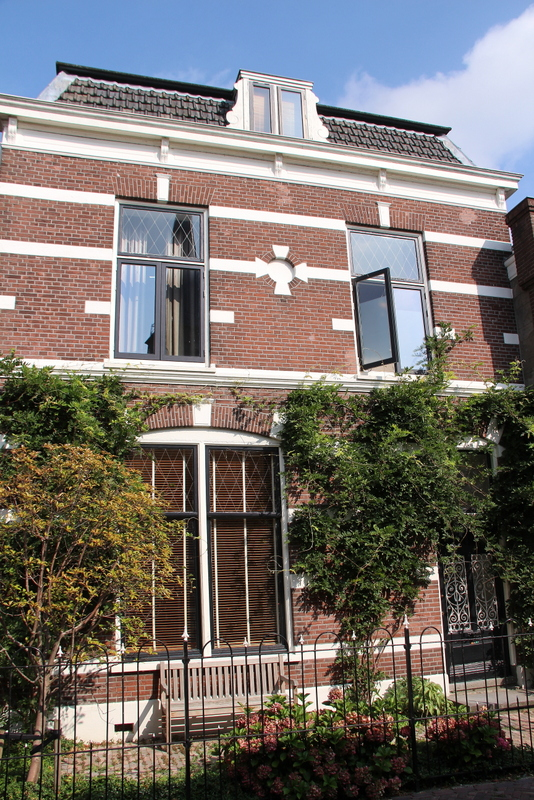
Former clergy house

== Notable people ==
- Cor van Oel (1899–1979), painter
- Gerard Vianen (1944), cyclist
- Janneke Vos (1977), cyclist
- Annemieke Kiesel-Griffioen (1979), football player
