= Breukelen =

- Town and former municipality
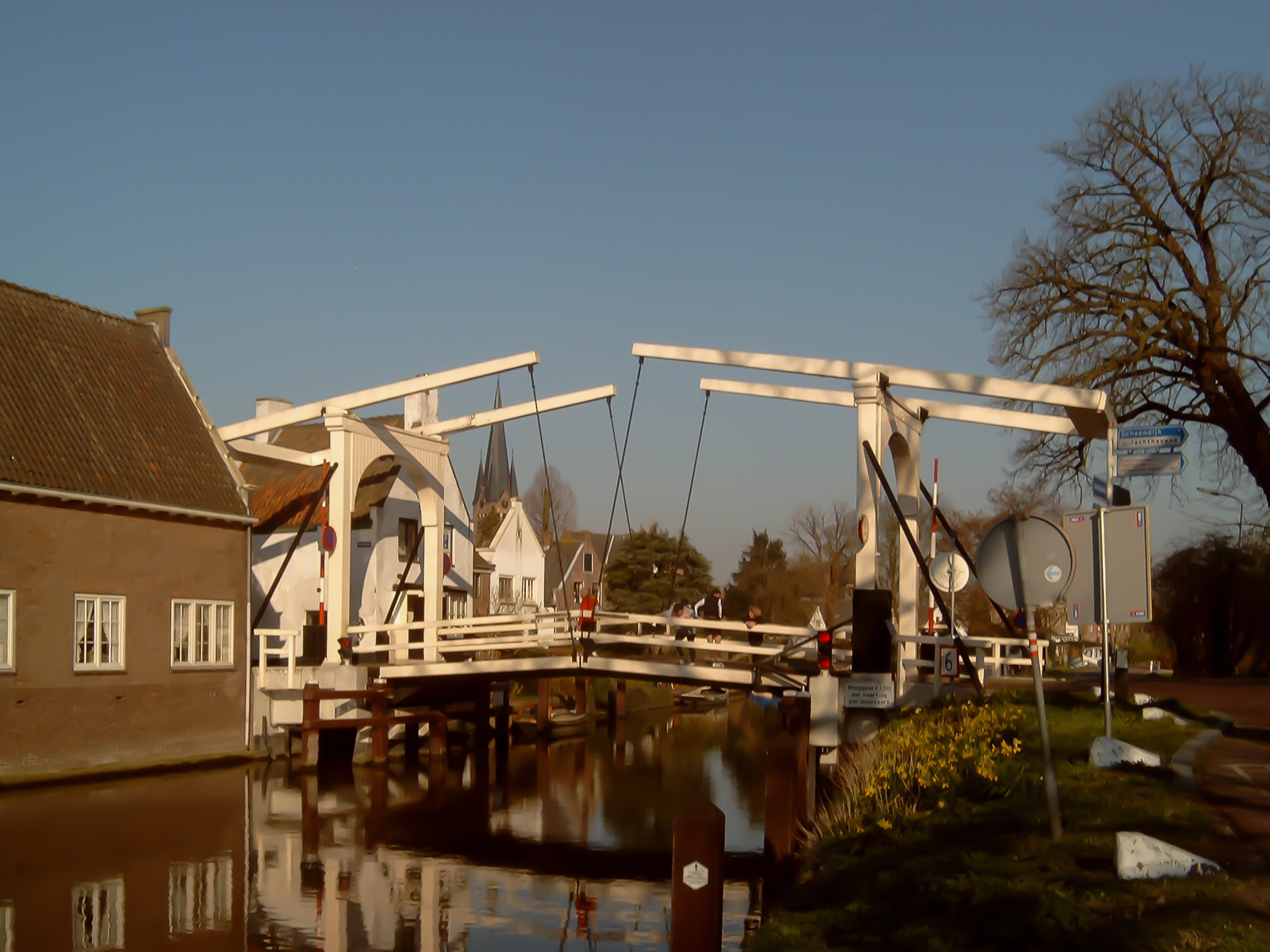
- Bridge across the Vecht

- Flag Coat of arms

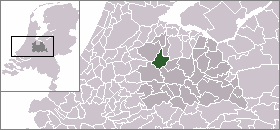
- Coordinates: 52°10′18″N 5°00′06″E
- Country: Netherlands
- Province: Utrecht
- Municipality: Stichtse Vecht

Area (2006)
  - Total: 48.65 km^{2} (18.78 sq mi)
  - Land: 44.48 km^{2} (17.17 sq mi)
  - Water: 4.17 km^{2} (1.61 sq mi)

Population (1 January 2007)
  - Total: 10,650
- Source: CBS, .
- Time zone: UTC+1 (CET)
  - Summer (DST): UTC+2 (CEST)
- Website: www.breukelen.nl

Breukelen (Dutch pronunciation: [ˈbrøːkələ(n)]) is a town and former municipality in the Netherlands, in the province of Utrecht. It is situated to the northwest of Utrecht, along the river Vecht and close to the lakes of the Loosdrechtse Plassen, an area of natural and tourist interest. It is located in an area called the Vechtstreek. It is the namesake of the borough of Brooklyn in New York City, New York.

== History ==
Breukelen's history dates back to the 7th century, when it was a village named Attingahem. Around the year 720, the first wooden church was built in the village by Saint Boniface. In the 8th century, a Frisian nobleman named Atte established a settlement there, constructing a fortified farm named the Breukelerhof.

During the 17th century, many wealthy Amsterdam merchant families built their mansions along the river Vecht. In the Disaster Year (1672) the village and its vicinity were severely damaged by warfare, if not looted and burned by the French.

On 1 January 2011, Breukelen merged with Loenen and Maarssen to form Stichtse Vecht.

The New York City borough of Brooklyn in the United States is named after Breukelen (see History of Brooklyn).

== Nyenrode Business University ==
The town is well known for the being the location of Nyenrode Business University. Founded in 1946, Nyenrode is a university that offers business and finance-related higher education.

== Transportation ==
- Breukelen railway station
- Bus services 120, 130, 143, 524 and 526

== Villages ==
The former municipality of Breukelen consisted of the following villages: Breukelen, Kockengen, and Nieuwer-Ter-Aa.

== Gallery ==
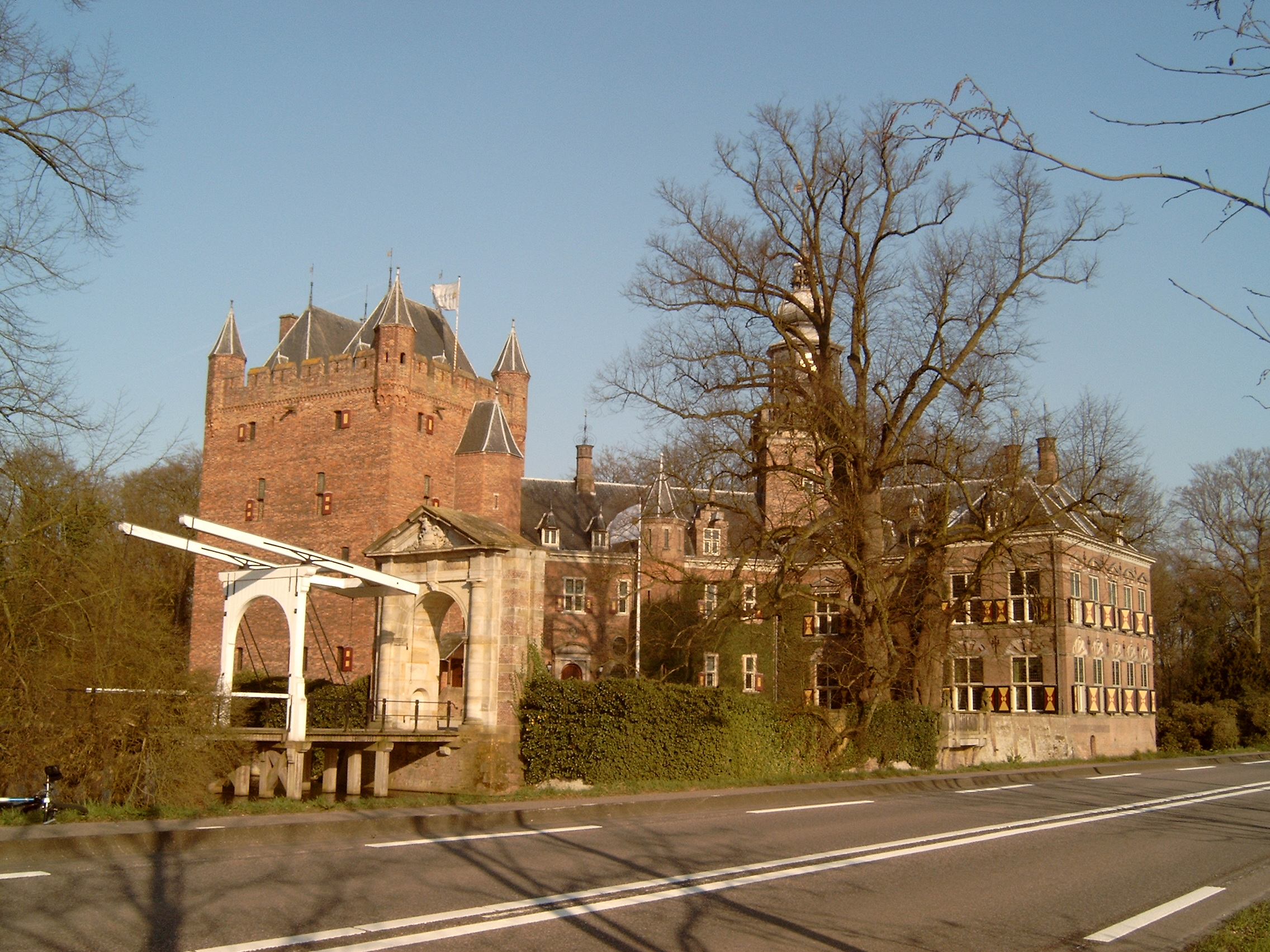
Breukelen, castle/university Nijenrode

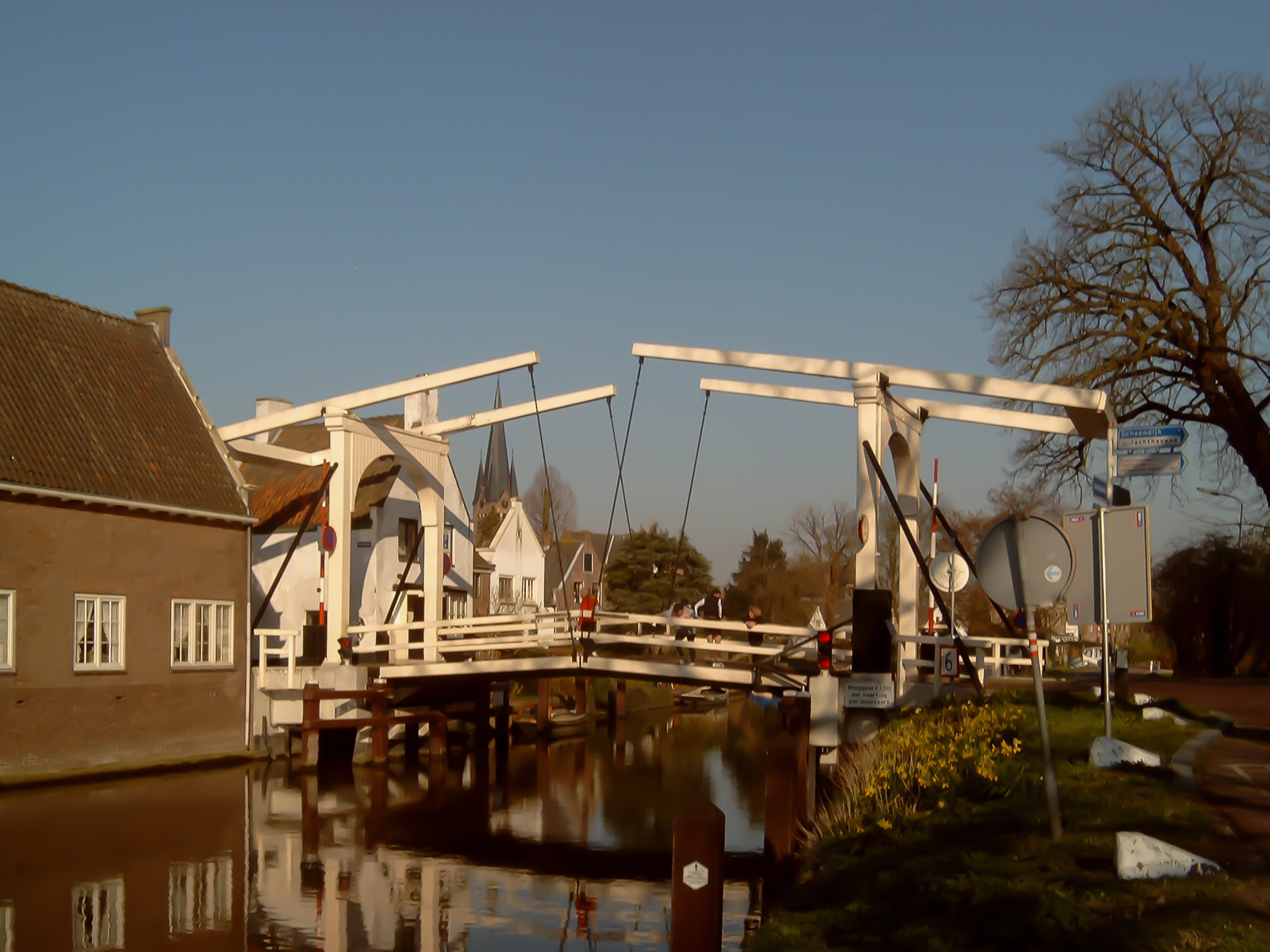
Breukelen, drawbridge across the Vecht

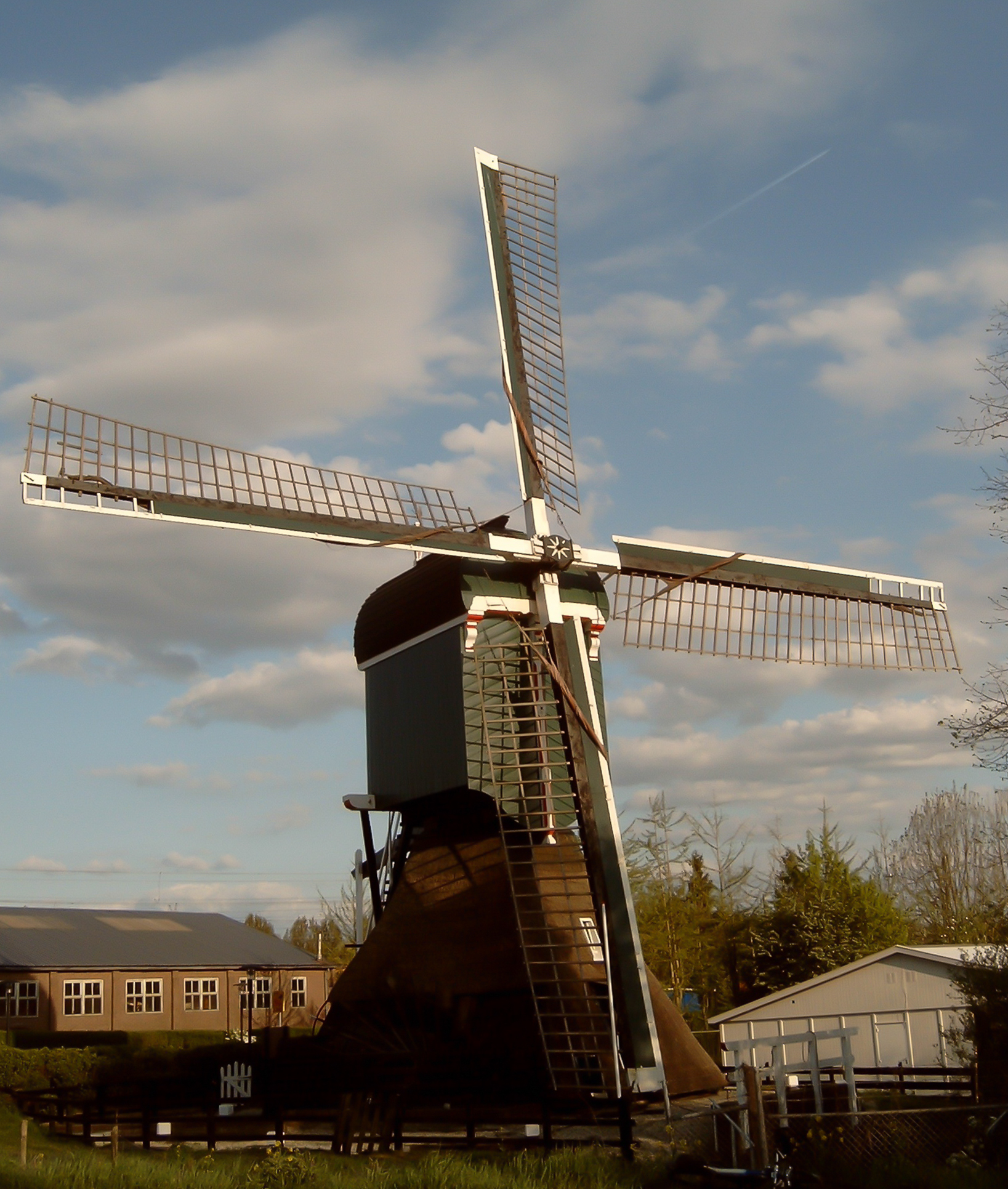
Breukelen, windmill

== People ==
- Bert Haars (1913–1997), jurist and politician
- Rutger Hauer (1944–2019), film actor
