= Abcoude =

- Town and former municipality
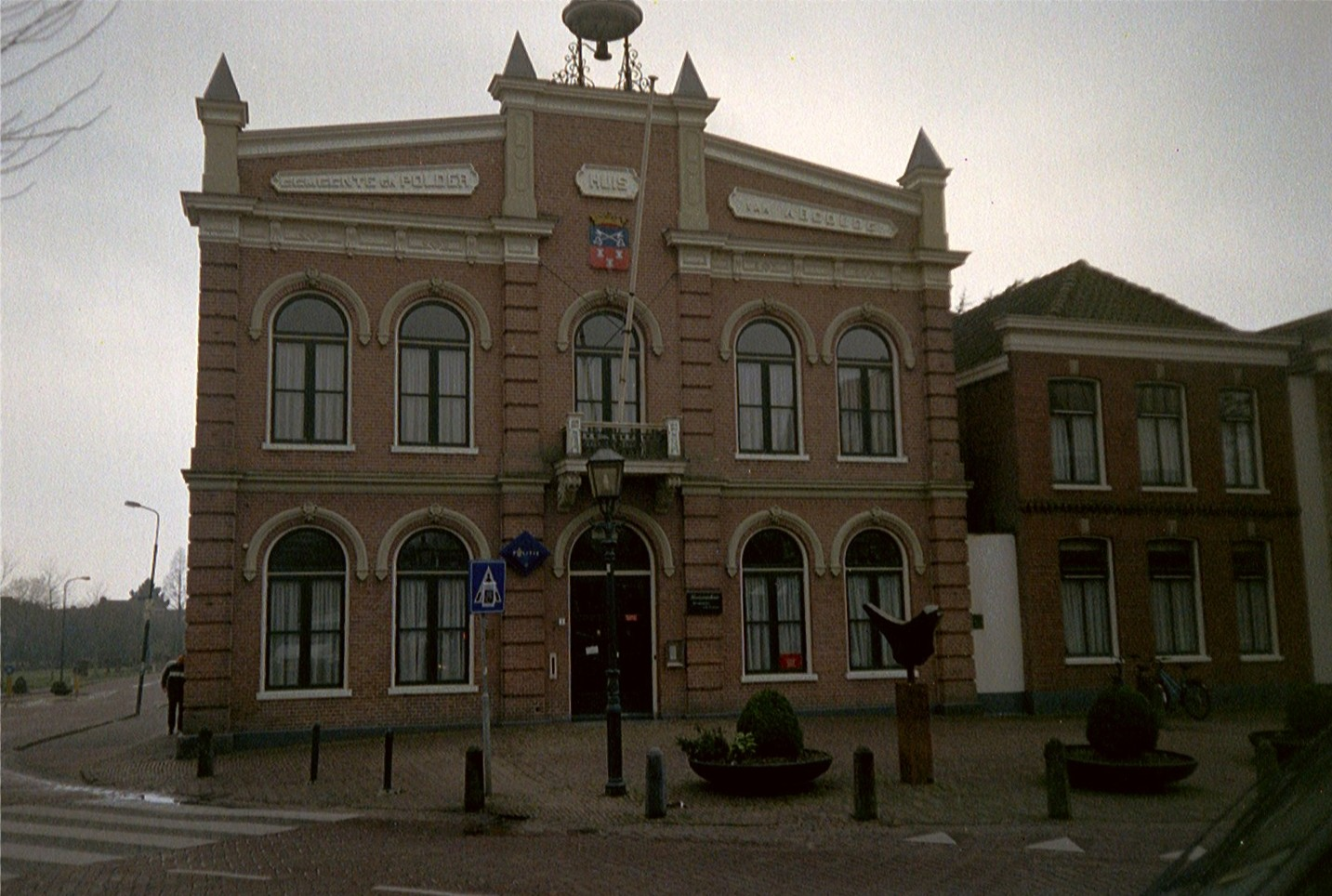
- Former Town Hall

- Flag Coat of arms

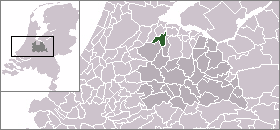
- Coordinates: 52.27°N 4.97°E
- Country: Netherlands
- Province: Utrecht
- Municipality: De Ronde Venen

Area (2006)
  - Total: 32.11 km^{2} (12.40 sq mi)
  - Land: 30.39 km^{2} (11.73 sq mi)
  - Water: 1.72 km^{2} (0.66 sq mi)

Population (2013)
  - Total: 8,657
  - Density: 365/km^{2} (950/sq mi)
- Source: CBS, Statline.
- Time zone: UTC+1 (CET)
  - Summer (DST): UTC+2 (CEST)
- Website: www.abcoude.nl

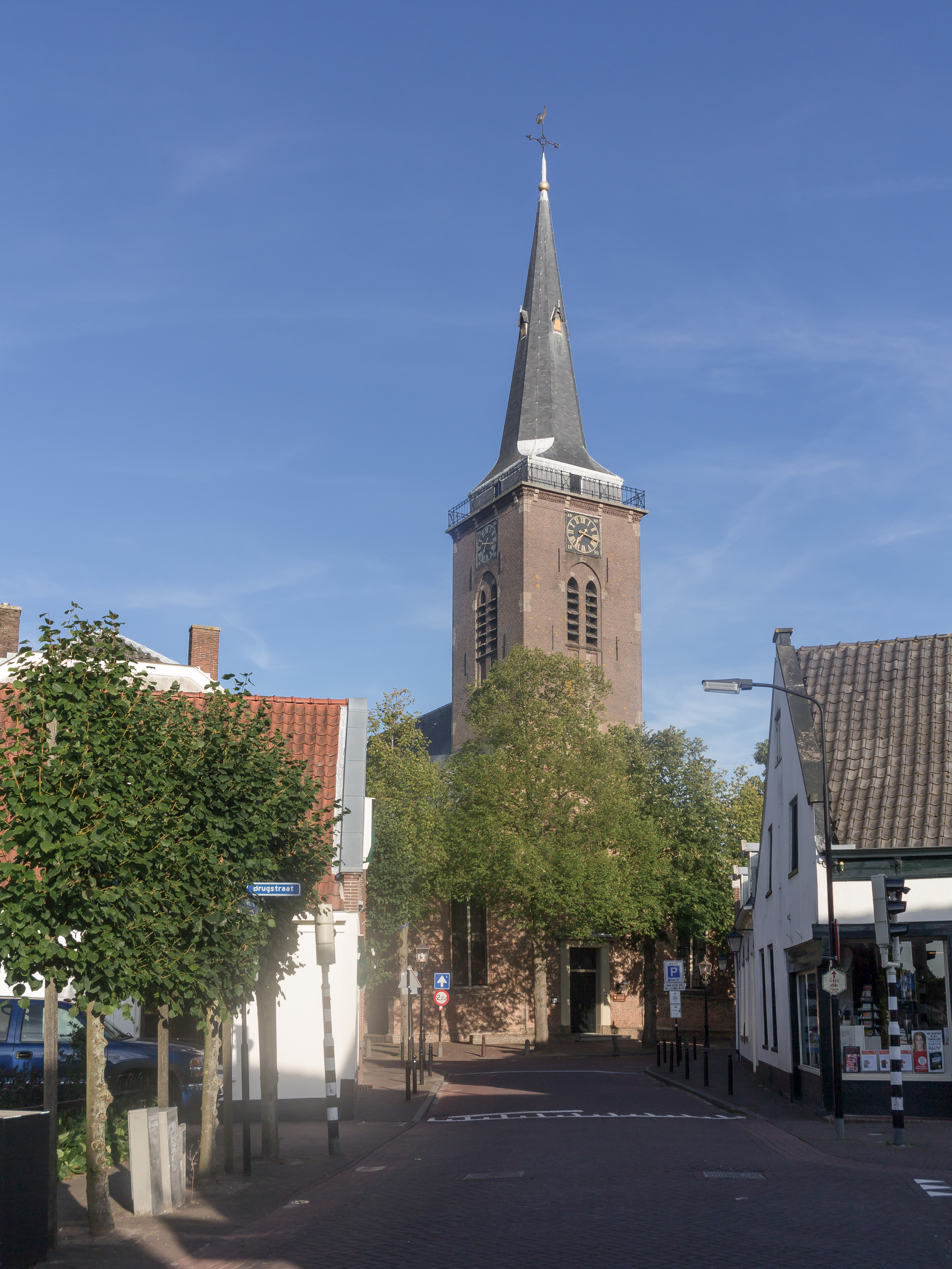
Abcoude, church: de Dorpskerk

Abcoude (Dutch pronunciation: [ɑpˈkʌudə]) is a town and former municipality in the Netherlands, in the province of Utrecht. Since 2011 it has been part of the municipality of De Ronde Venen.

== Population centres ==
The former municipality of Abcoude consisted of the villages of Abcoude and Baambrugge and the hamlet of Stokkelaarsbrug.

== Geography ==
Abcoude lies in the Province Utrecht, about 13 km southeast of (the centre of) Amsterdam, on the confluence of the Angstel, Gein and Holendrecht rivers.

== History ==
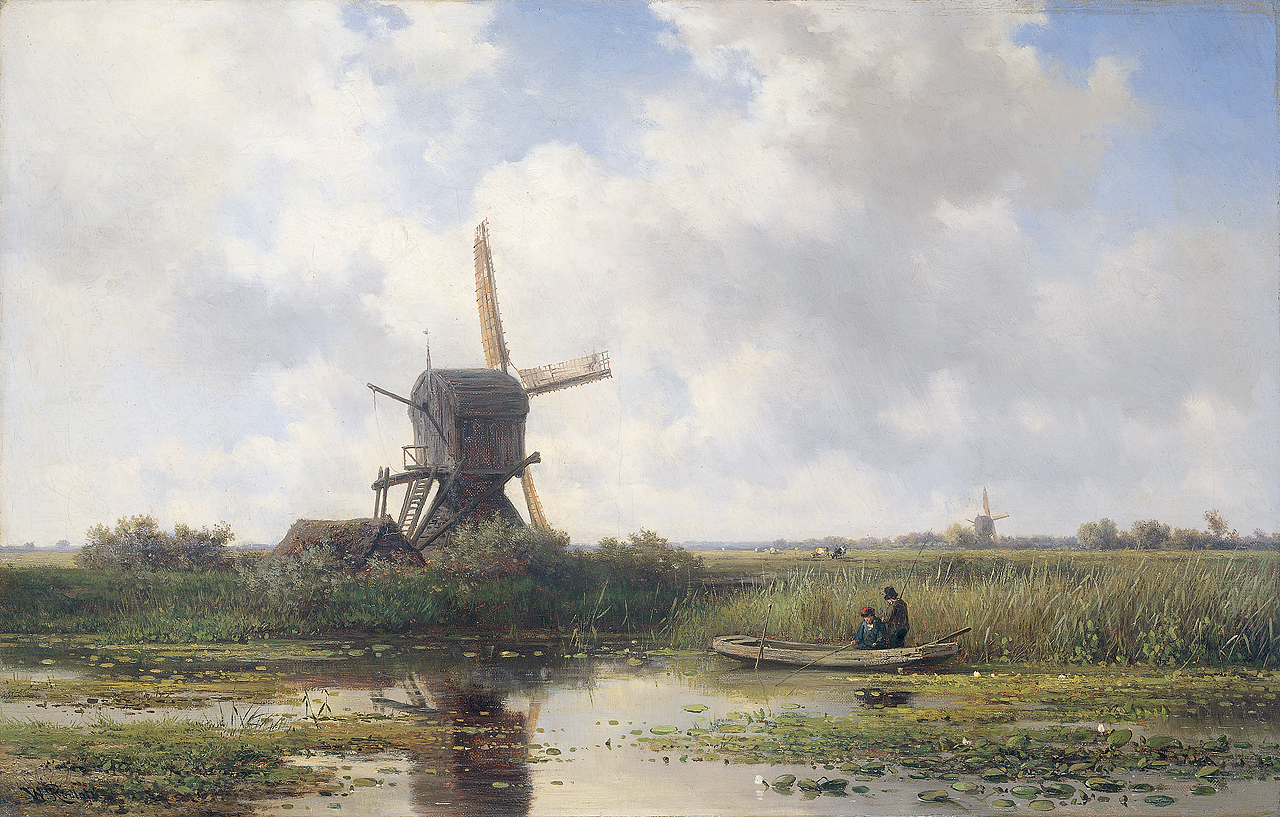
In 't Gein bij Abcoude by Willem Roelofs (1870)

Abcoude was first mentioned in a report from 1085 by the bishop of Utrecht. In this document the residents of Abcoude were named ’habitatores de Abecenwalde’. In 1672 most of the town was burned down by the French. In 1820 Abcoude had 1,100 inhabitants. In 2001 it had 6,431 inhabitants, growing to 8,295 in 2023.

The municipality of Abcoude was formed in 1941, from the former municipalities of Abcoude-Proosdij (containing the village of Abcoude) and Abcoude-Baambrugge (containing the village of Baambrugge).

== Transport ==
The town is served by Abcoude railway station. It is in the northern part of Abcoude. There are direct services to Amsterdam, Utrecht, Gouda and Rotterdam.

== Local government ==
Until 2011 the municipal council of Abcoude consisted of 13 seats, which at the last election held in 2006 were divided as follows:

- CDA - 3 seats
- SVAB (local party) - 3 seats
- VVD - 3 seats
- PvdA - 2 seats
- D66 - 1 seat
- GroenLinks - 1 seat

An election was held in November 2010 for a council for the new merged De Ronde Venen municipality that commenced work in January 2011, replacing Abcoude council.
