= Achterbos =

- Hamlet
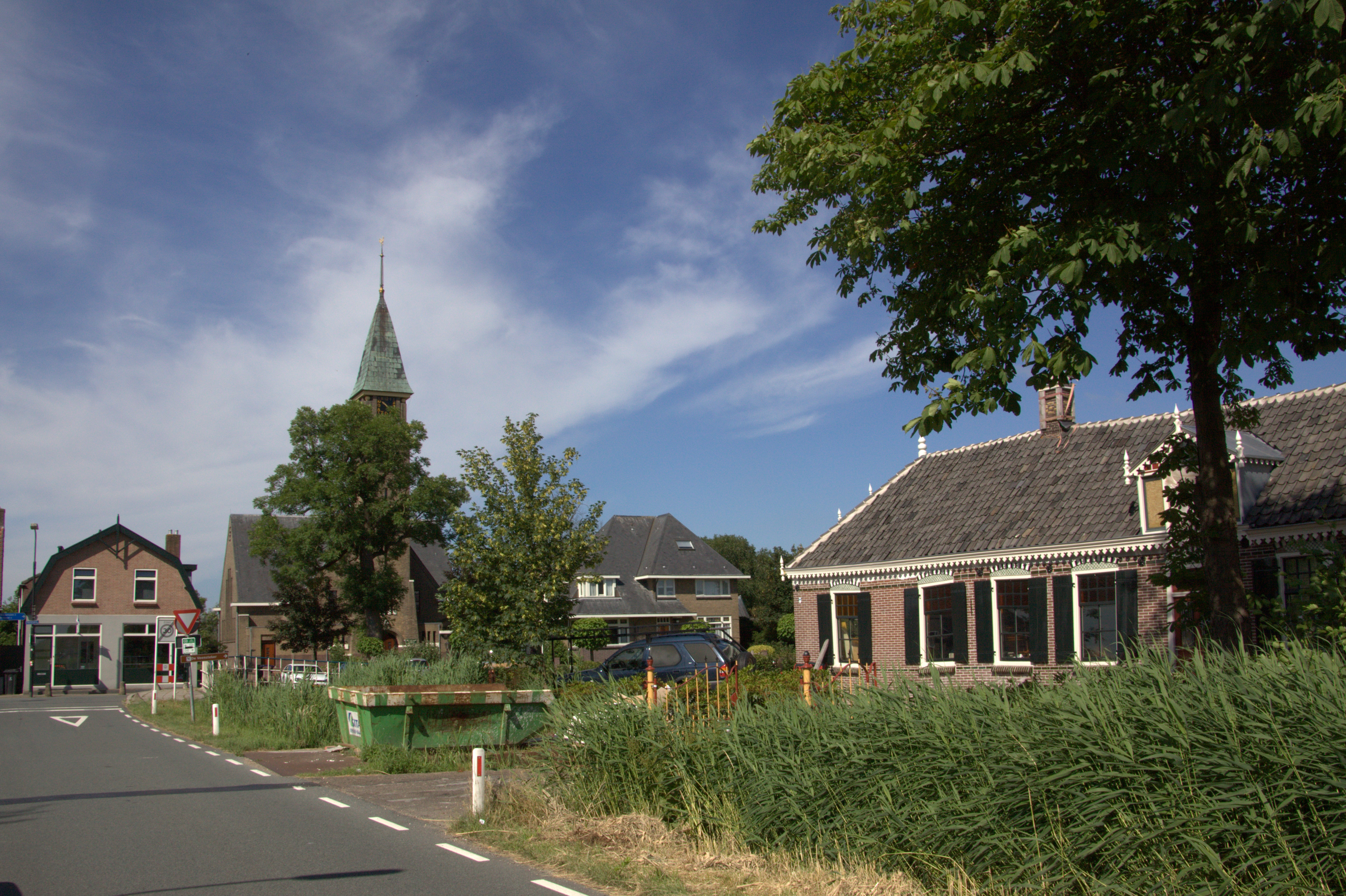
- View on Achterbos

- Location in the Netherlands Achterbos (Netherlands)
- Coordinates: 52°13′30″N 4°55′32″E
- Country: Netherlands
- Province: Utrecht
- Municipality: De Ronde Venen
- Time zone: UTC+1 (CET)
  - Summer (DST): UTC+2 (CEST)
- Postal code: 3648
- Dialing code: 0297

Achterbos is a hamlet in the Dutch province of Utrecht. It is located in the municipality of De Ronde Venen, directly north of Vinkeveen.

It was first mentioned in 1575 as Den afterbos, and means forest which is located backwards (far away). Achterbos is not a statistical entity, and the postal authorities have placed it under Vinkeveen. Until the 19th century, it was a hard to reach peninsula in the moorland. In 1880, the area around Achterbos was poldered. Achterbos nowadays consists of about 120 houses.

== Gallery ==
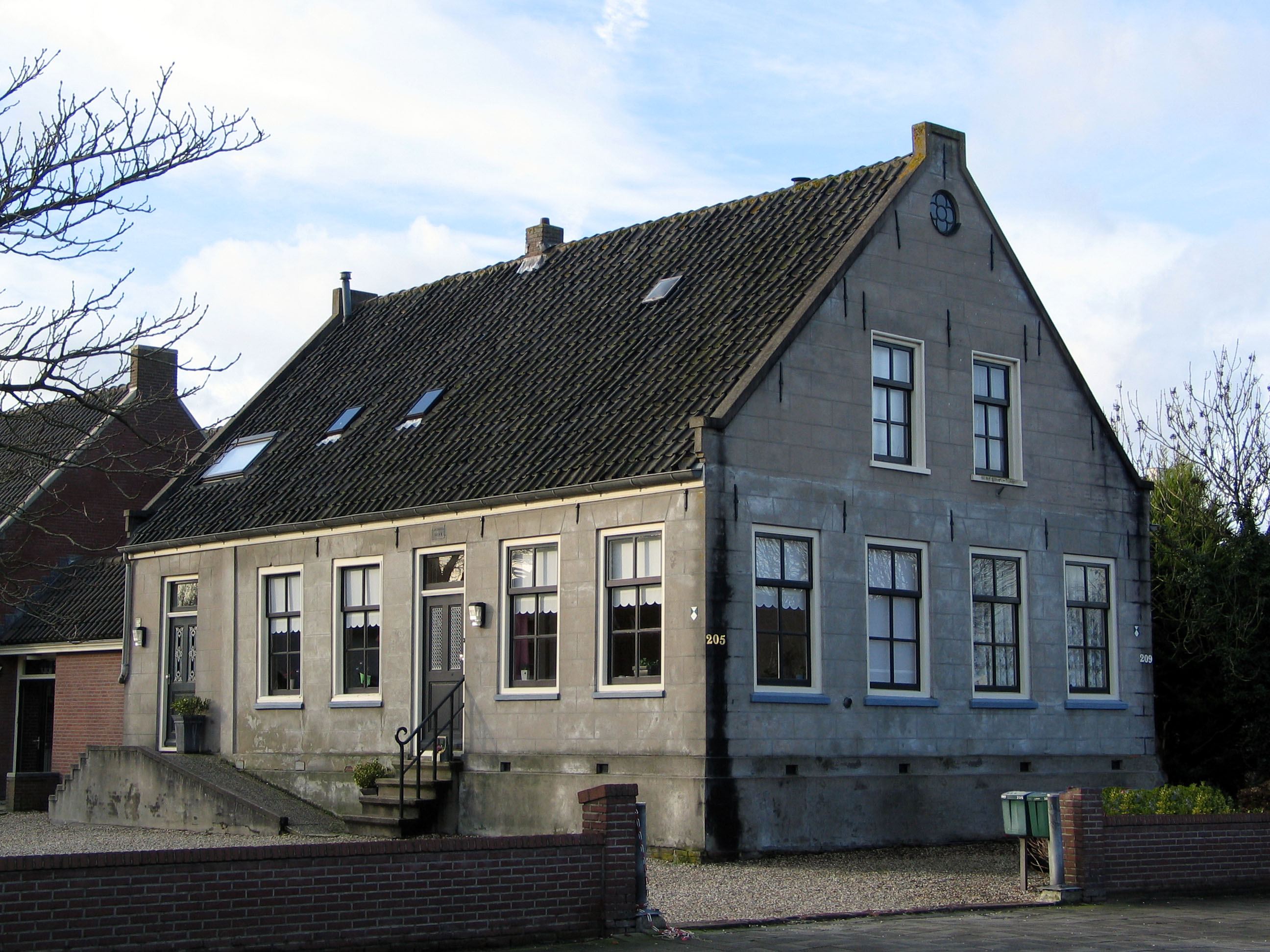
Former farm

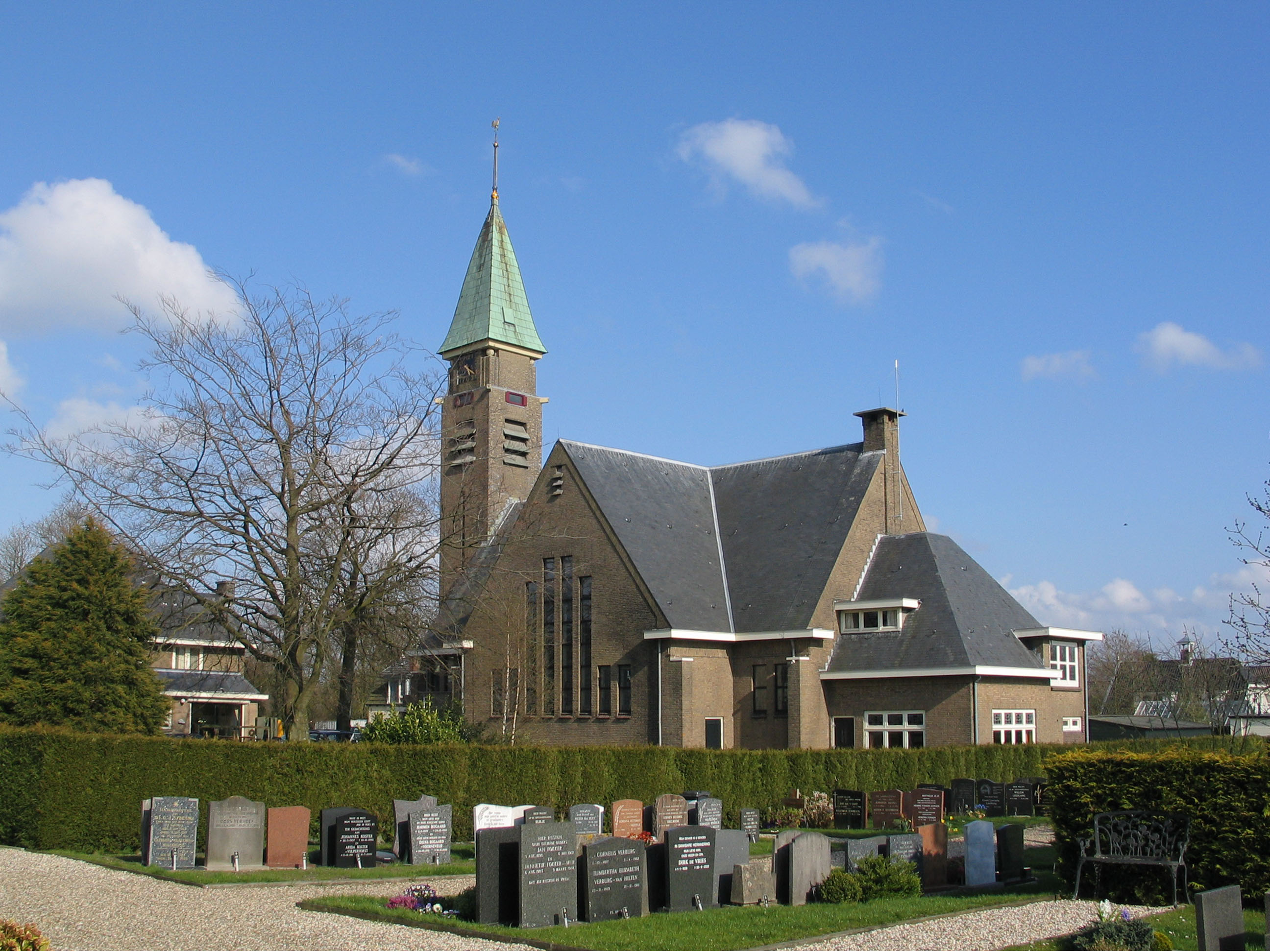
Protestant church

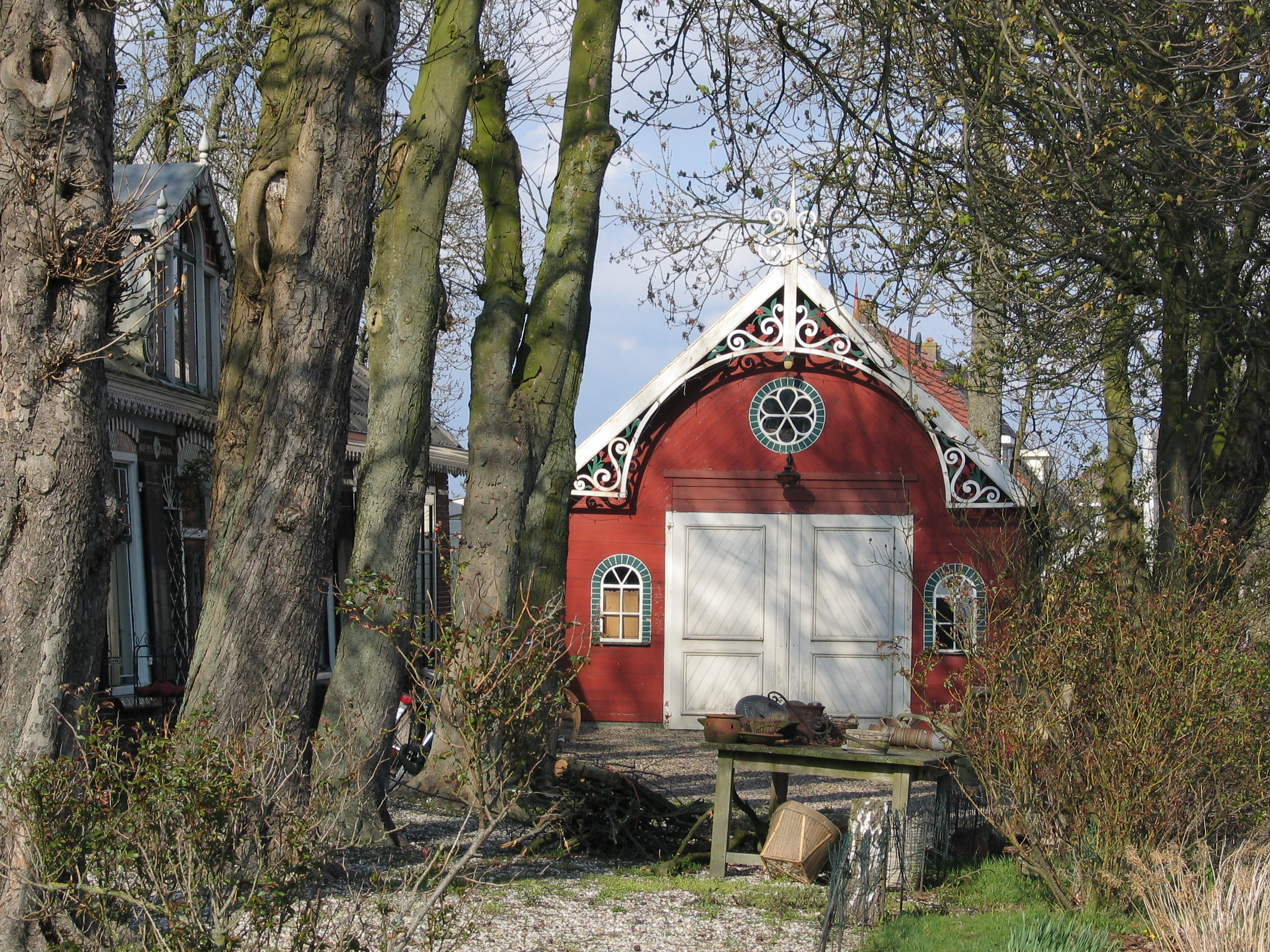
Former wheelwright at Achterbos
