= Aan de Zuwe =

- Hamlet
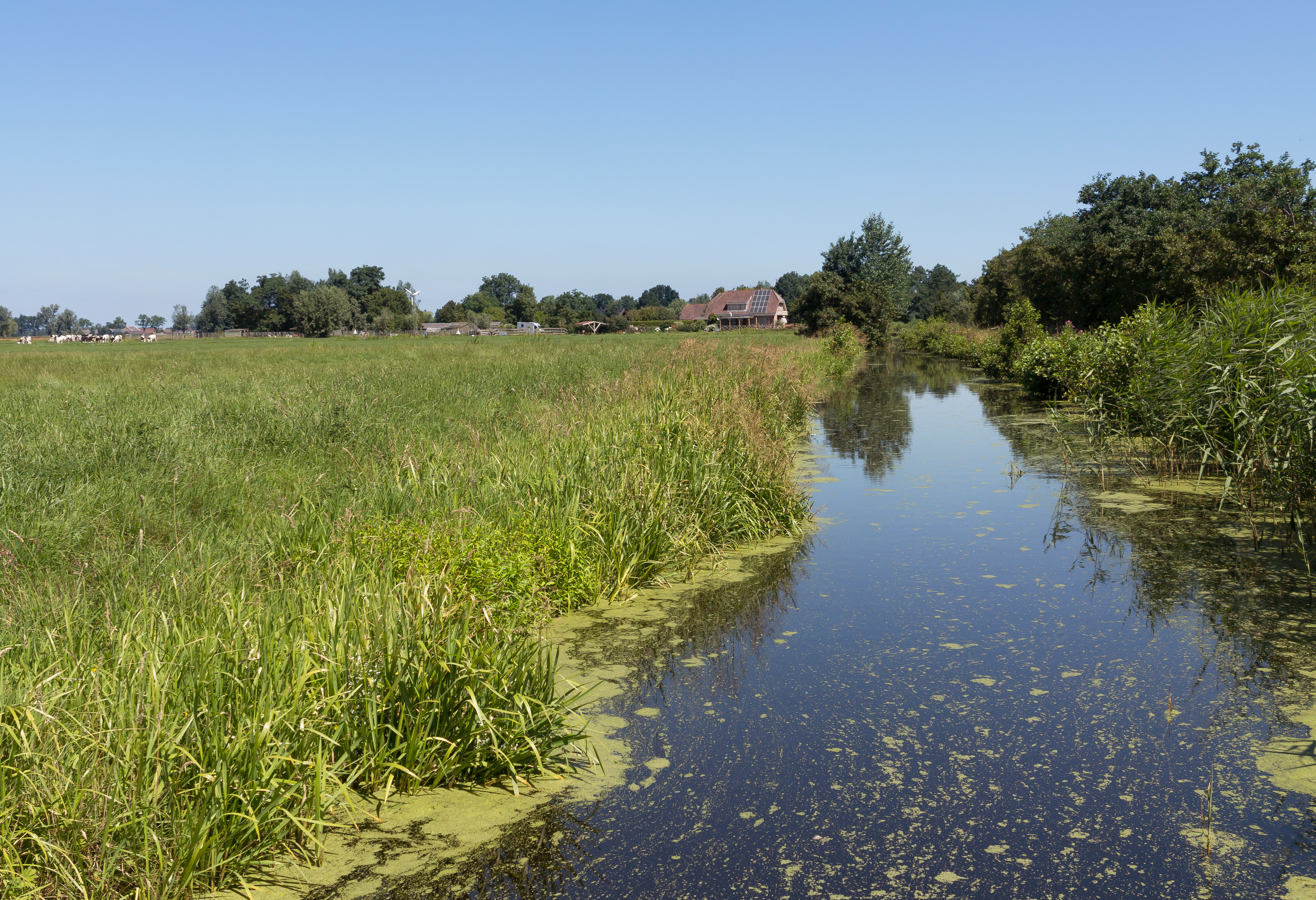
- Aan de Zuwe

- Location in the Netherlands Aan de Zuwe (Netherlands)
- Coordinates: 52°10′20″N 4°54′5″E
- Country: Netherlands
- Province: Utrecht
- Municipality: De Ronde Venen
- Time zone: UTC+1 (CET)
  - Summer (DST): UTC+2 (CEST)
- Postal code: 3648
- Dialing code: 0297

Aan de Zuwe is a hamlet in the Dutch province of Utrecht. It is located in the municipality of De Ronde Venen, 3 km south of Wilnis.

It was first mentioned in 1936 as Aan-de-Zuwe, and it references the Willenser Zuwe, a canal on which the hamlet is situated. The canal is named after the "sidewards (dike)" of Wilnis . Aan de Zuwe is not a statistical entity, and the postal authorities have placed it under Wilnis. There are no place name signs. Aan de Zuwe has a dozen houses and 40 to 50 holiday homes.
