= Vinkeveen en Waverveen =

Coordinates: 52°13′15″N 4°55′00″E

Coat of Arms

Vinkeveen en Waverveen is a former municipality in the Dutch province of Utrecht. It was created in a merger of Vinkeveen and Waverveen in 1841, and existed until 1989, when the new municipality of De Ronde Venen was formed.
