= Stokkelaarsbrug =

- Hamlet
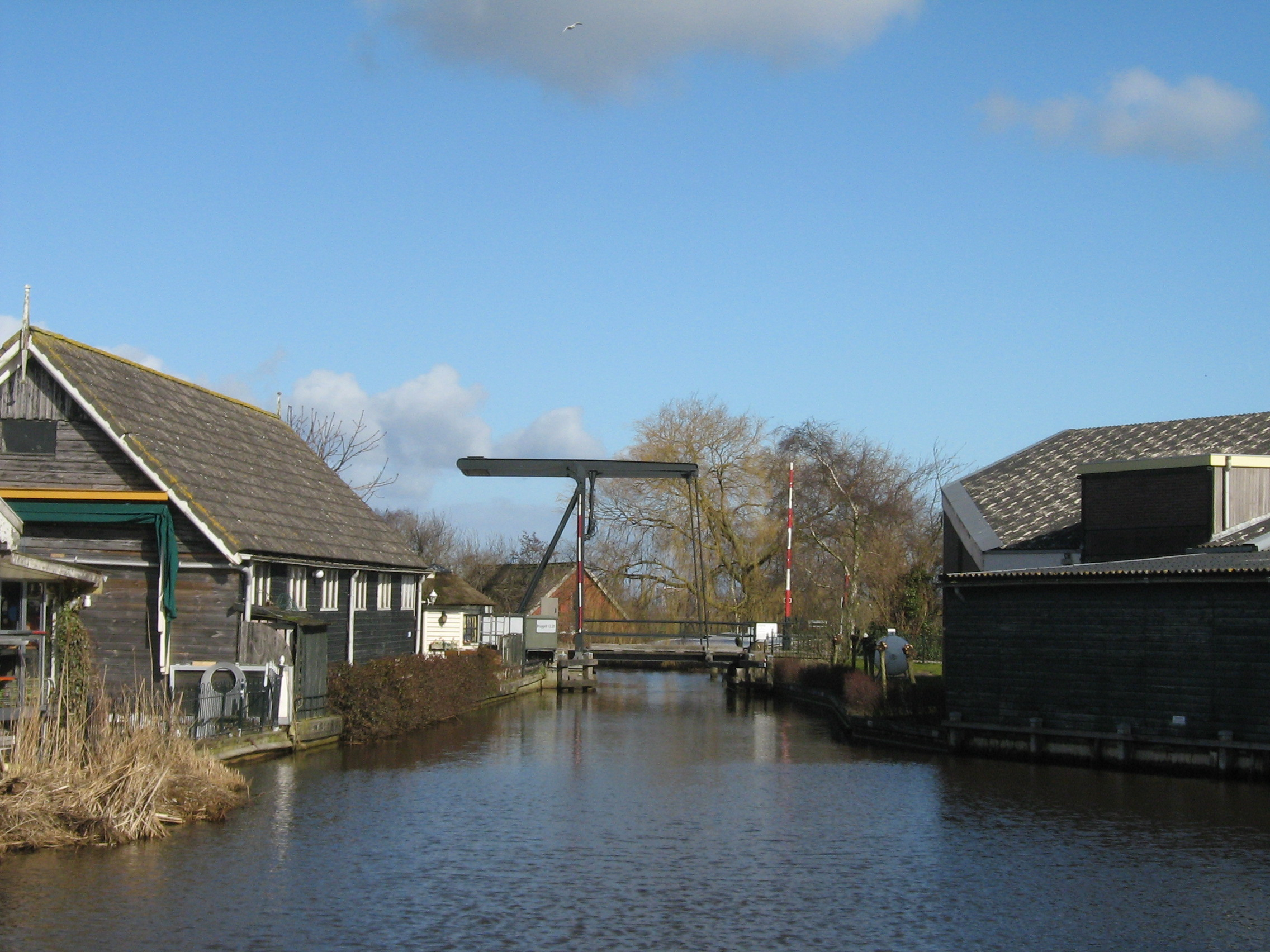
- The bridge of Stokkelaarsbrug

- Location in the Netherlands Stokkelaarsbrug (Netherlands)
- Coordinates: 52.2687°N 4.9299°E
- Country: Netherlands
- Province: Utrecht
- Municipality: De Ronde Venen
- Time zone: UTC+1 (CET)
  - Summer (DST): UTC+2 (CEST)
- Postal code: 3646
- Dialing code: 0297

Stokkelaarsbrug is a hamlet in the Dutch province of Utrecht. It is a part of the municipality of De Ronde Venen, and lies about 12 km south of Amsterdam. It is located on the border with the province North Holland, where the small river Winkel joins the Oude Waver.

It was first mentioned in 1575 as Stoppelaers brug, and is named after the bridge. The first part is unclear. Stokkelaarsbrug is not a statistical entity, and the postal authorities have placed it under Waverveen. It has no place name signs, and consists of about 20 houses.
