= Wilnis =

- Village
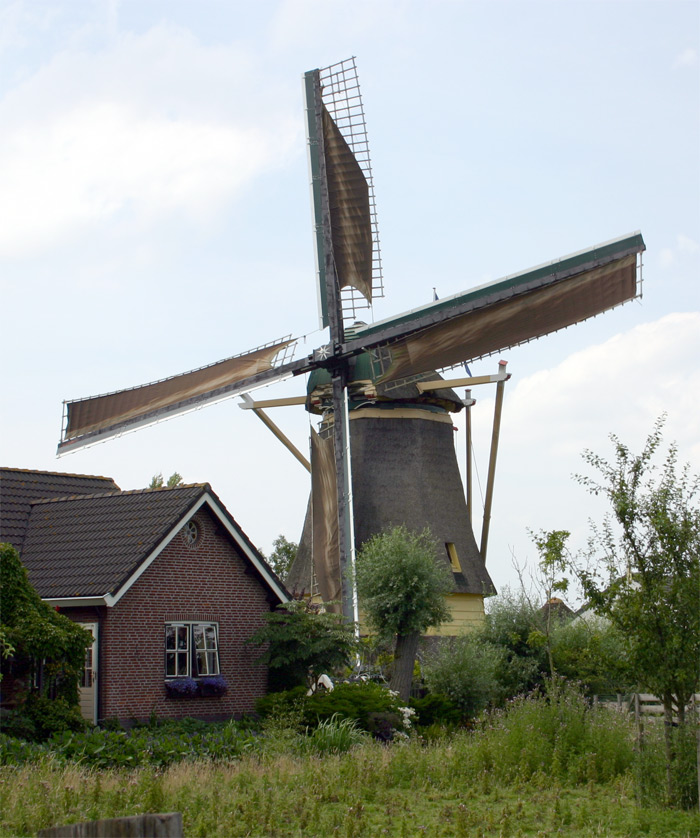
- Windmill in Wilnis

- Flag Coat of arms

- Location in the Netherlands Wilnis (Netherlands)
- Coordinates: 52°11′52″N 4°54′0″E
- Country: Netherlands
- Province: Utrecht
- Municipality: De Ronde Venen

Area
  - Total: 20.93 km^{2} (8.08 sq mi)
- Elevation: −1.8 m (−5.9 ft)

Population (2021)
  - Total: 6,985
  - Density: 333.7/km^{2} (864.4/sq mi)
- Time zone: UTC+1 (CET)
  - Summer (DST): UTC+2 (CEST)
- Postal code: 3648
- Dialing code: 0297

Wilnis is a village in the Dutch province of Utrecht. It is located in the municipality of De Ronde Venen, between Mijdrecht and Vinkeveen. It is about twenty kilometres south of Amsterdam.

Wilnis was a separate municipality until 1989.

== History ==
It was first mentioned in 1185 as Wildenisse, and means wilderness. Wilnis started as a peat excavation village in the 12th century, and formed into a long linear settlement. In 1739, the tower of the Dutch Reformed Church collapsed. Between 1877 and 1878, a new church with tower was constructed. In 1840, the village was home to 1,041 people. New neighbourhoods have been built in the polder.

The grist mill De Veenmolen was built in 1823, but might be older. It continued in operation until 1947. It was restored between 1972 and 1973, and is occasionally used for grinding.

== Gallery ==
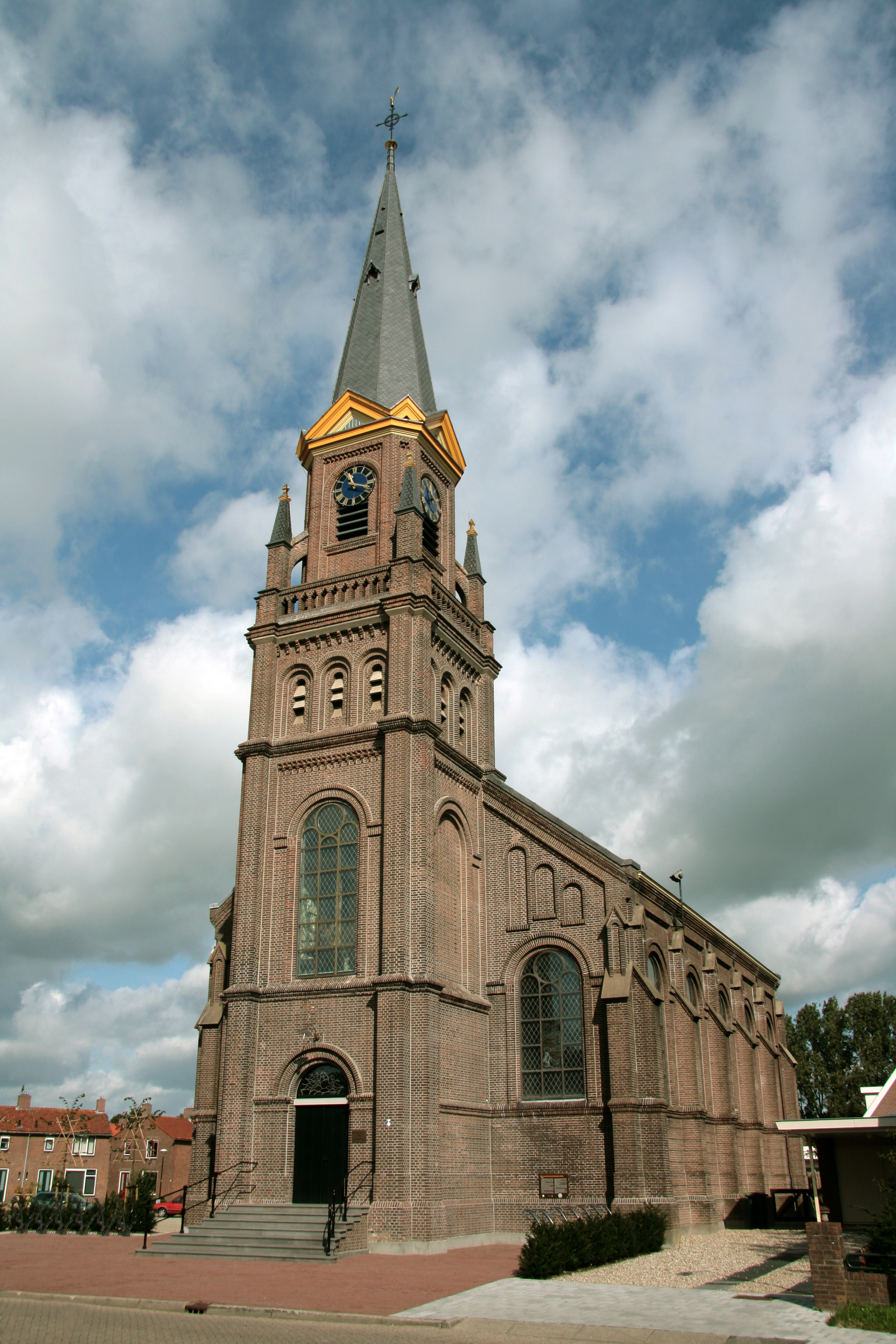
Church of Wilnis

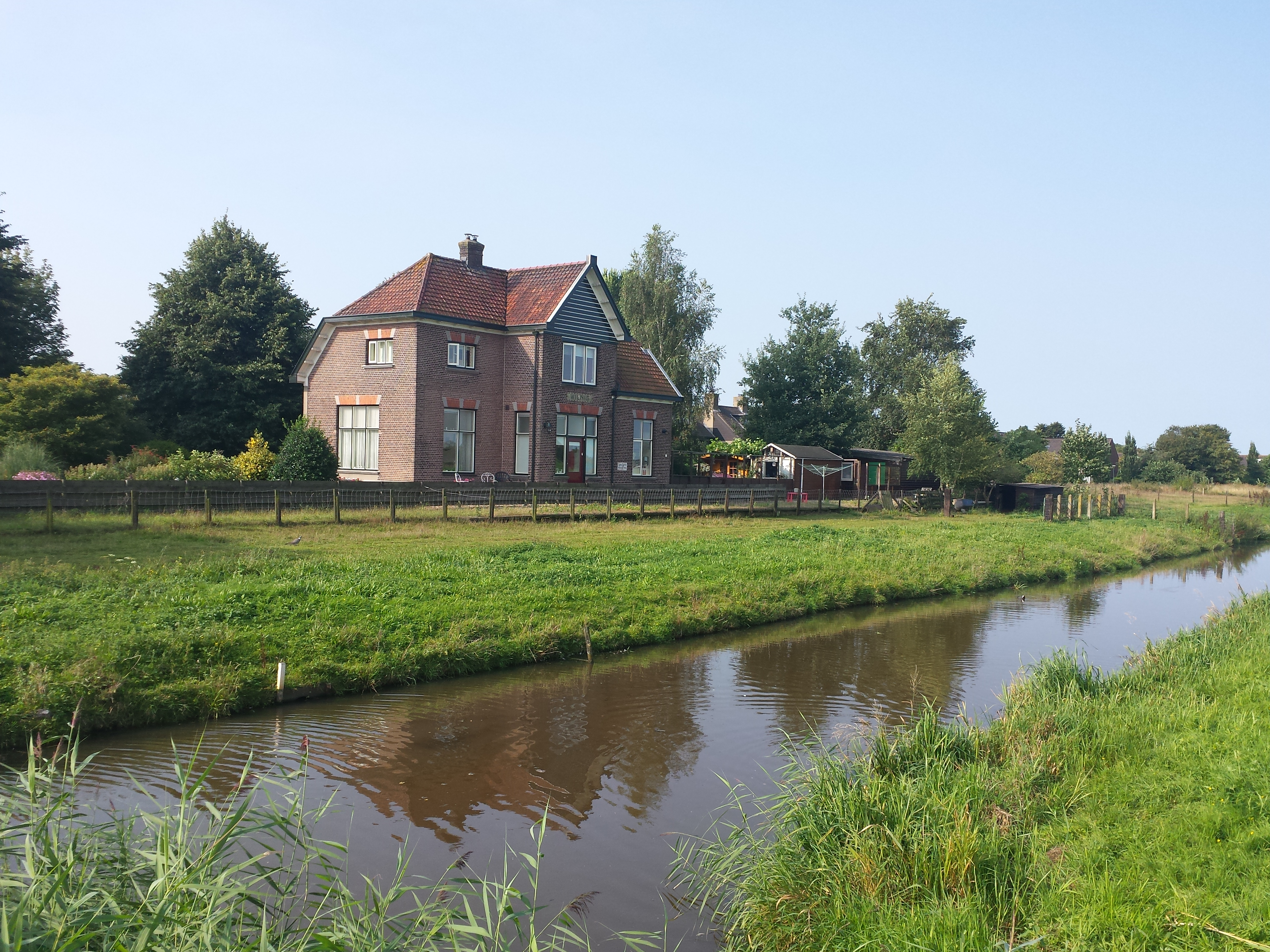
Farm in Wilnis

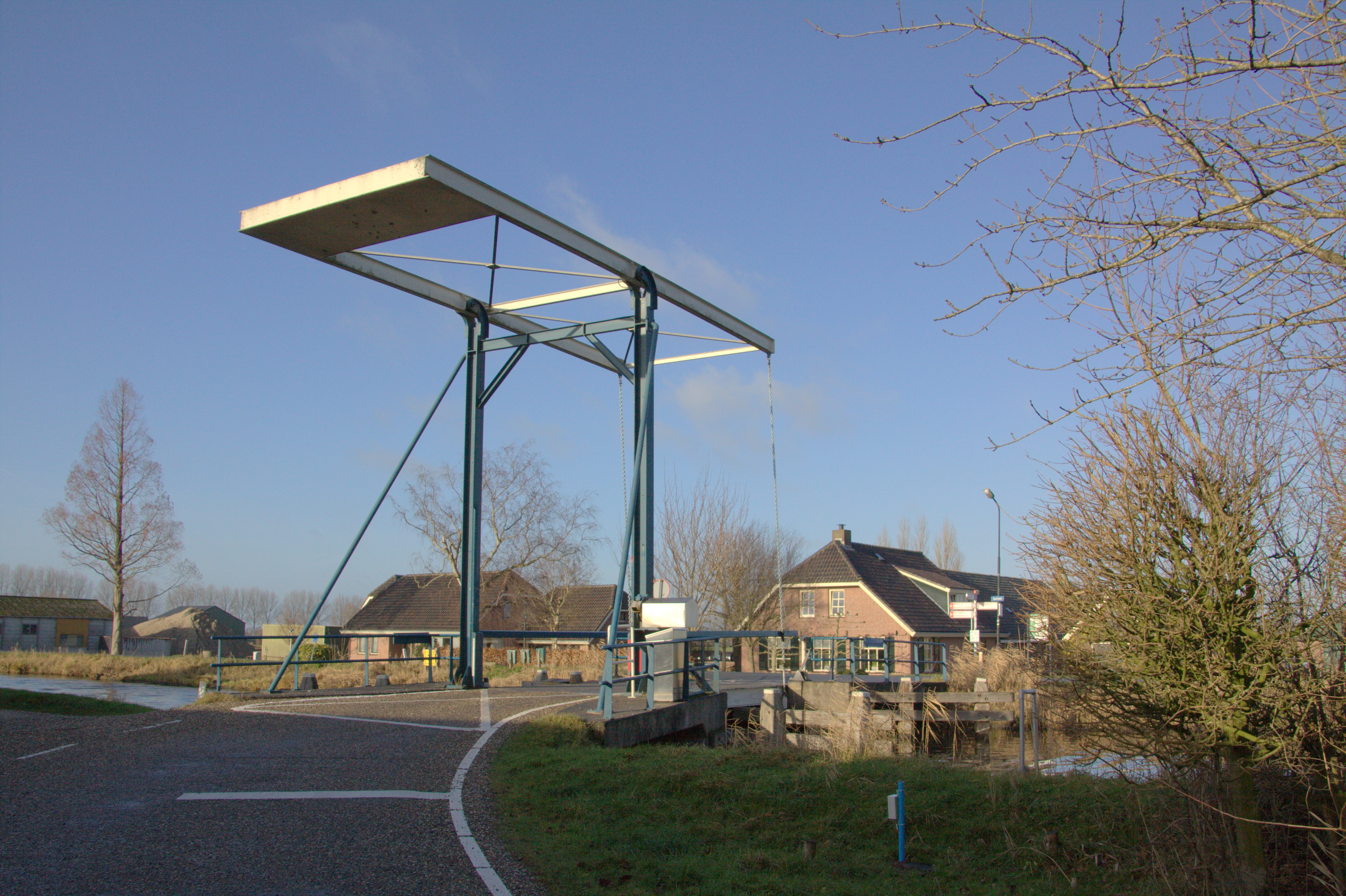
Draw bridge

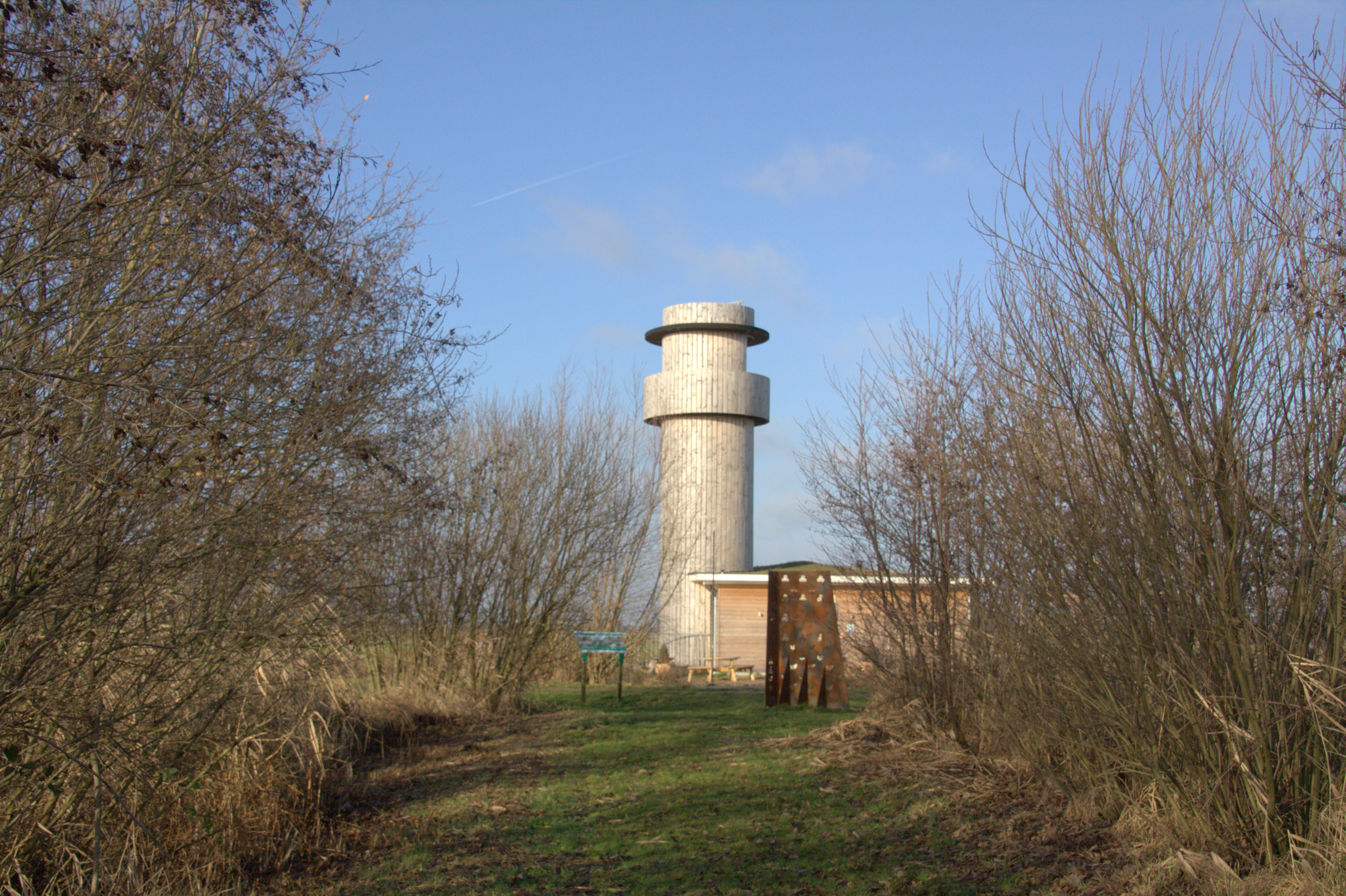
Tower De Grote Snip
