= De Hoef, Utrecht =

De Hoef
- Village
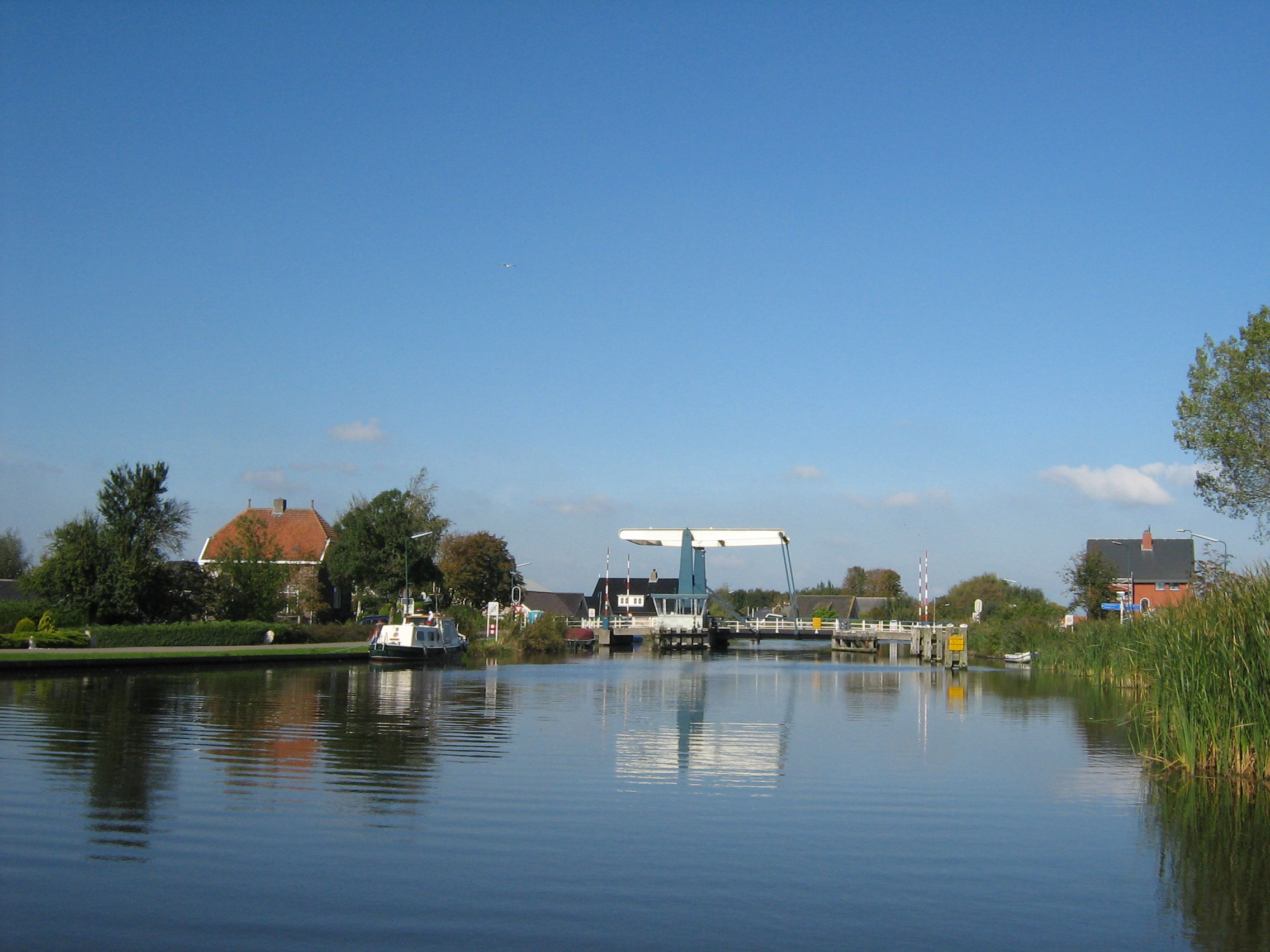
- Bridge across the Kromme Mijdrecht

- Location in the Netherlands De Hoef (Netherlands)
- Coordinates: 52°12′35″N 4°48′53″E
- Country: Netherlands
- Province: Utrecht
- Municipality: De Ronde Venen

Area
  - Total: 5.68 km^{2} (2.19 sq mi)
- Elevation: −1.1 m (−3.6 ft)

Population (2021)
  - Total: 880
  - Density: 150/km^{2} (400/sq mi)
- Time zone: UTC+1 (CET)
  - Summer (DST): UTC+2 (CEST)
- Postal code: 1426
- Dialing code: 0297

De Hoef is a village in the Dutch province of Utrecht. It is a part of the municipality of De Ronde Venen, and lies about 13 km northeast of Alphen aan den Rijn.

Flowing through the village is a meandering river called "de Kromme Mijdrecht", the width of which varies between about 8 and 35 metres. On average, it is used by about two freight ships per day, but in summer the river is full of pleasure boats.

It was first mentioned in 1639 as De Hoeff, and means "parcel of land". In 1840, it was home to 266 people. In 1921, the Roman Catholic Antonius van Padua Church was built.

== Gallery ==
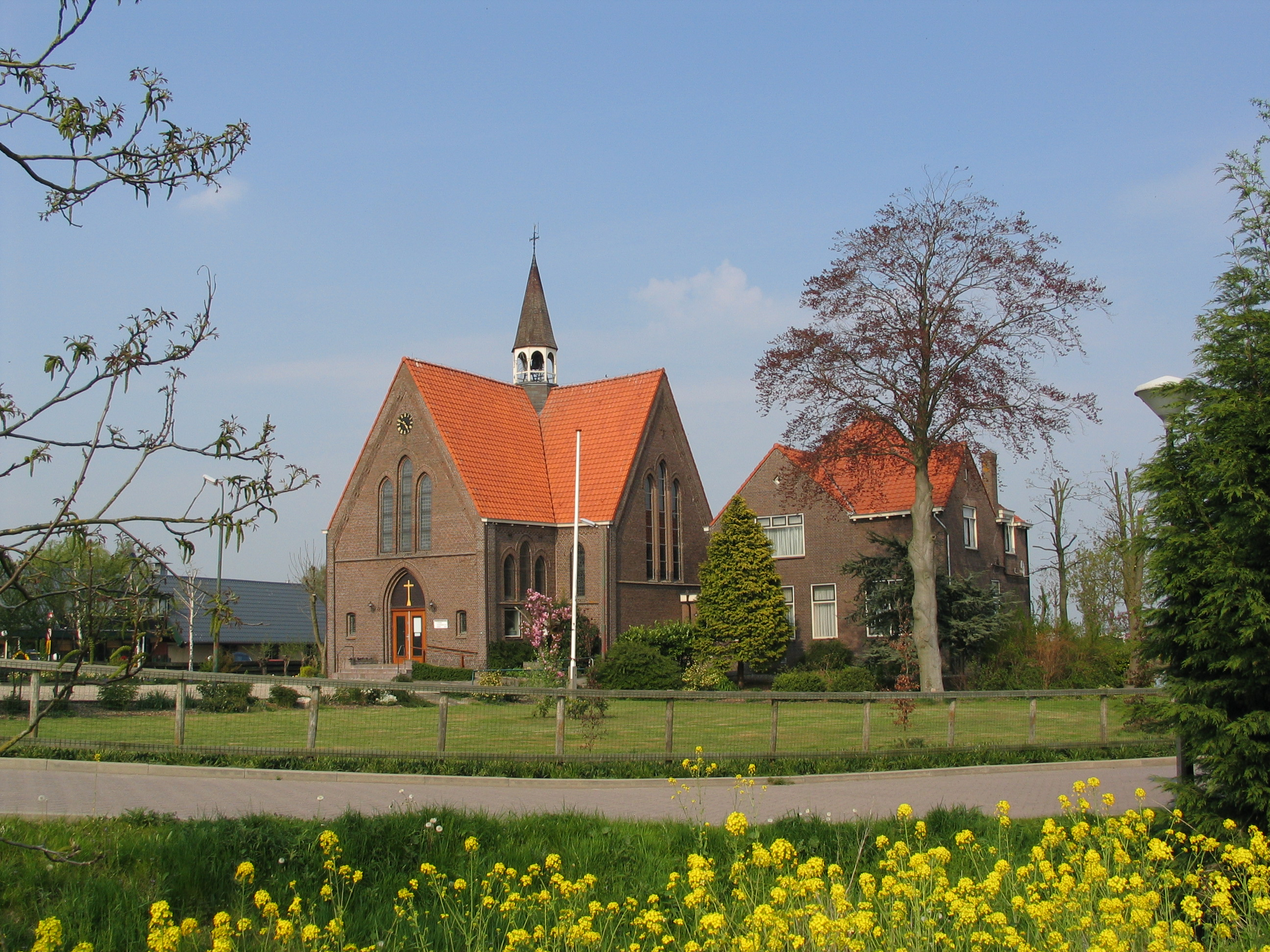
Church of De Hoef

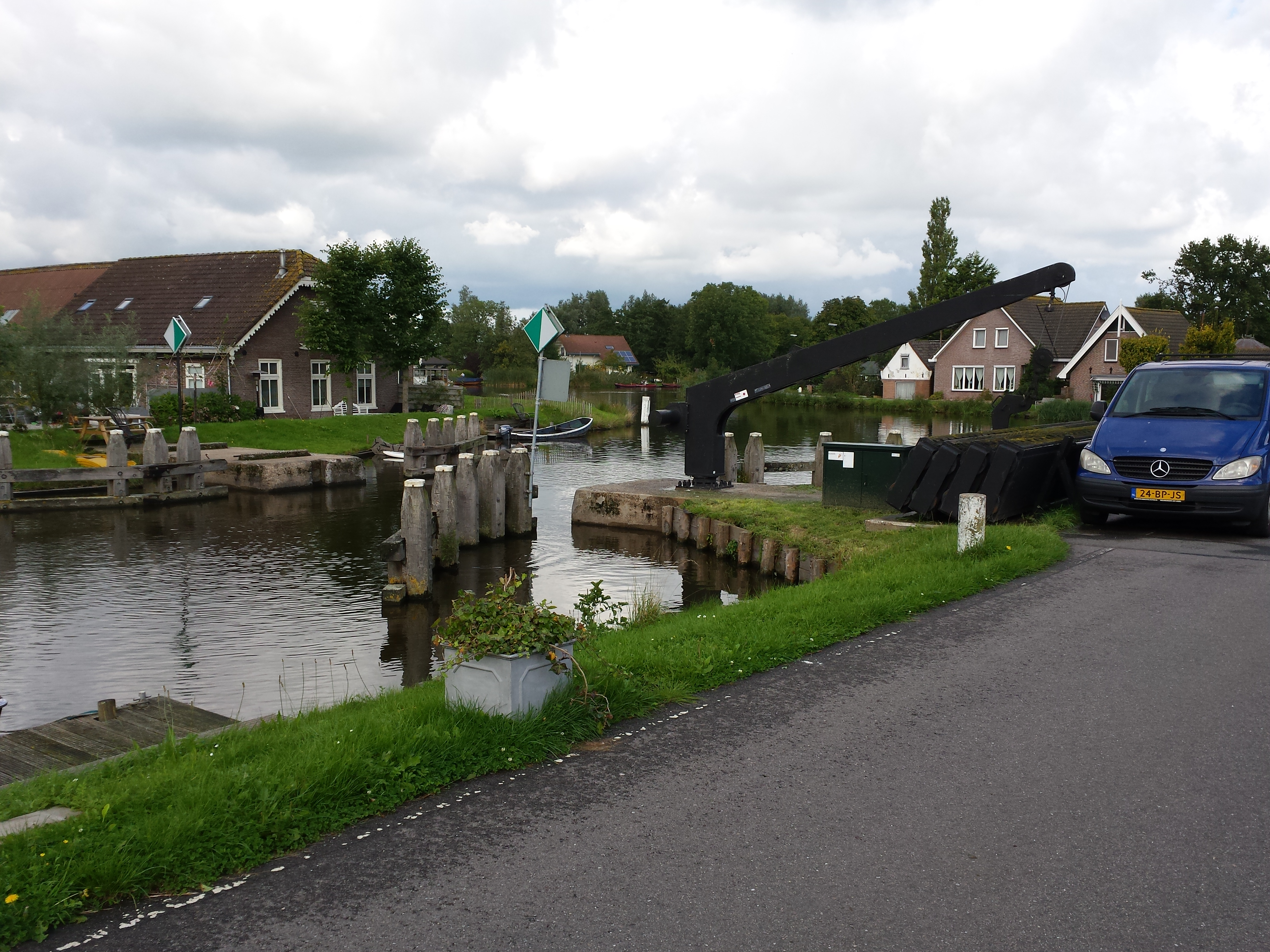
River view

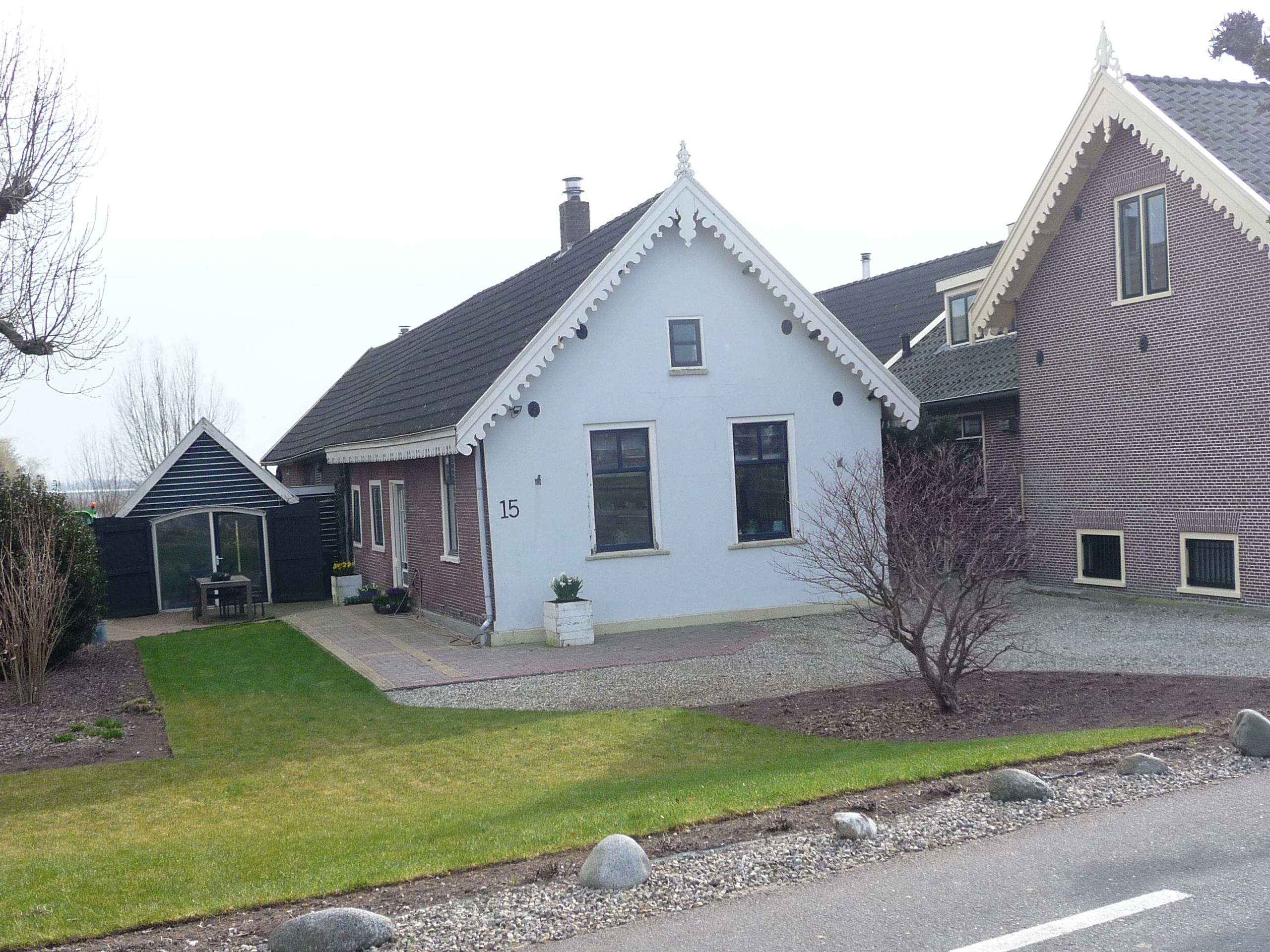
House in De Hoef

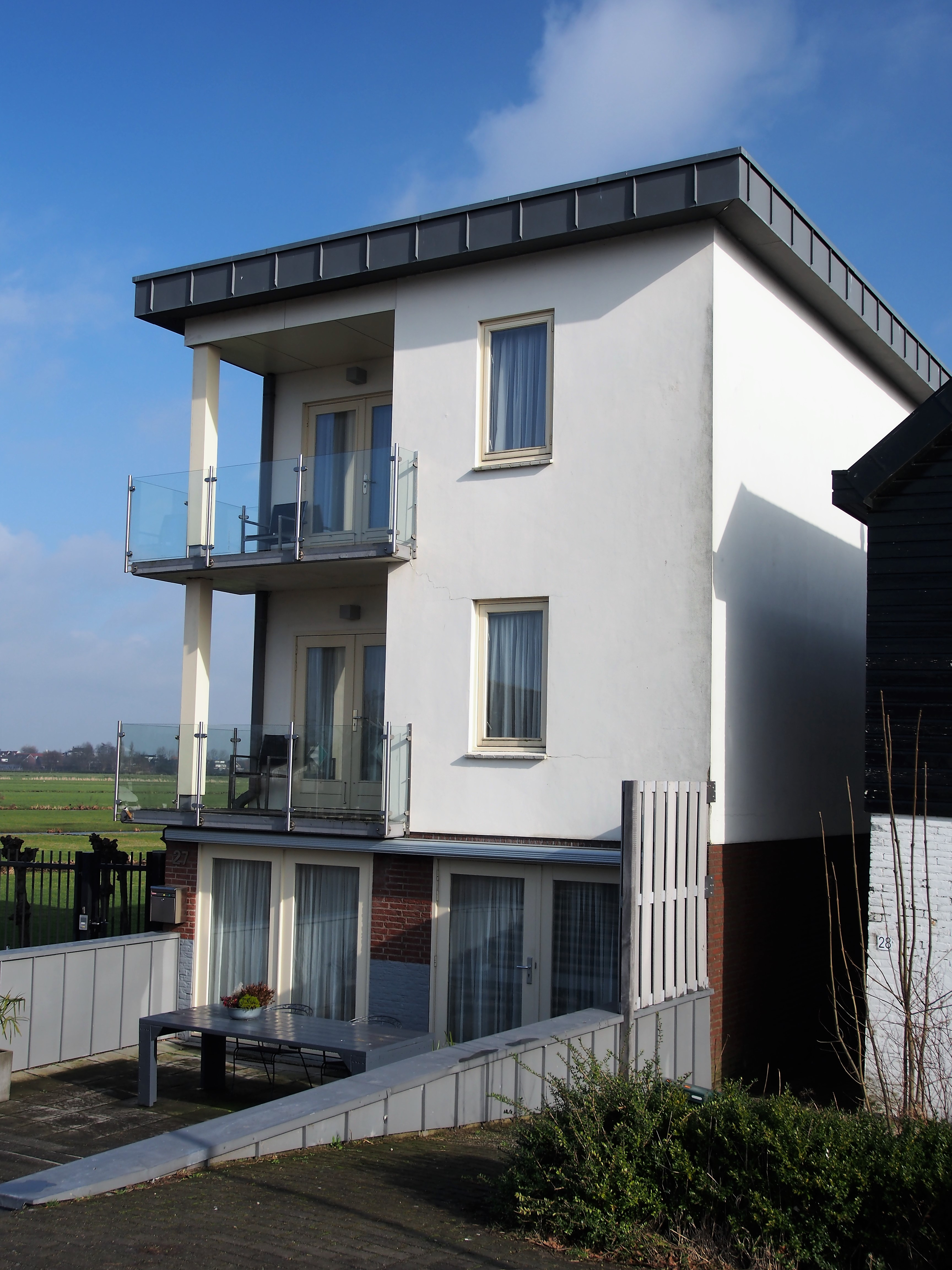
House in De Hoef

== Notable residents ==
- Nicolien Sauerbreij (born 1979), Olympic champion snowboard (born in De Hoef)
