= Waverveen =

- Village
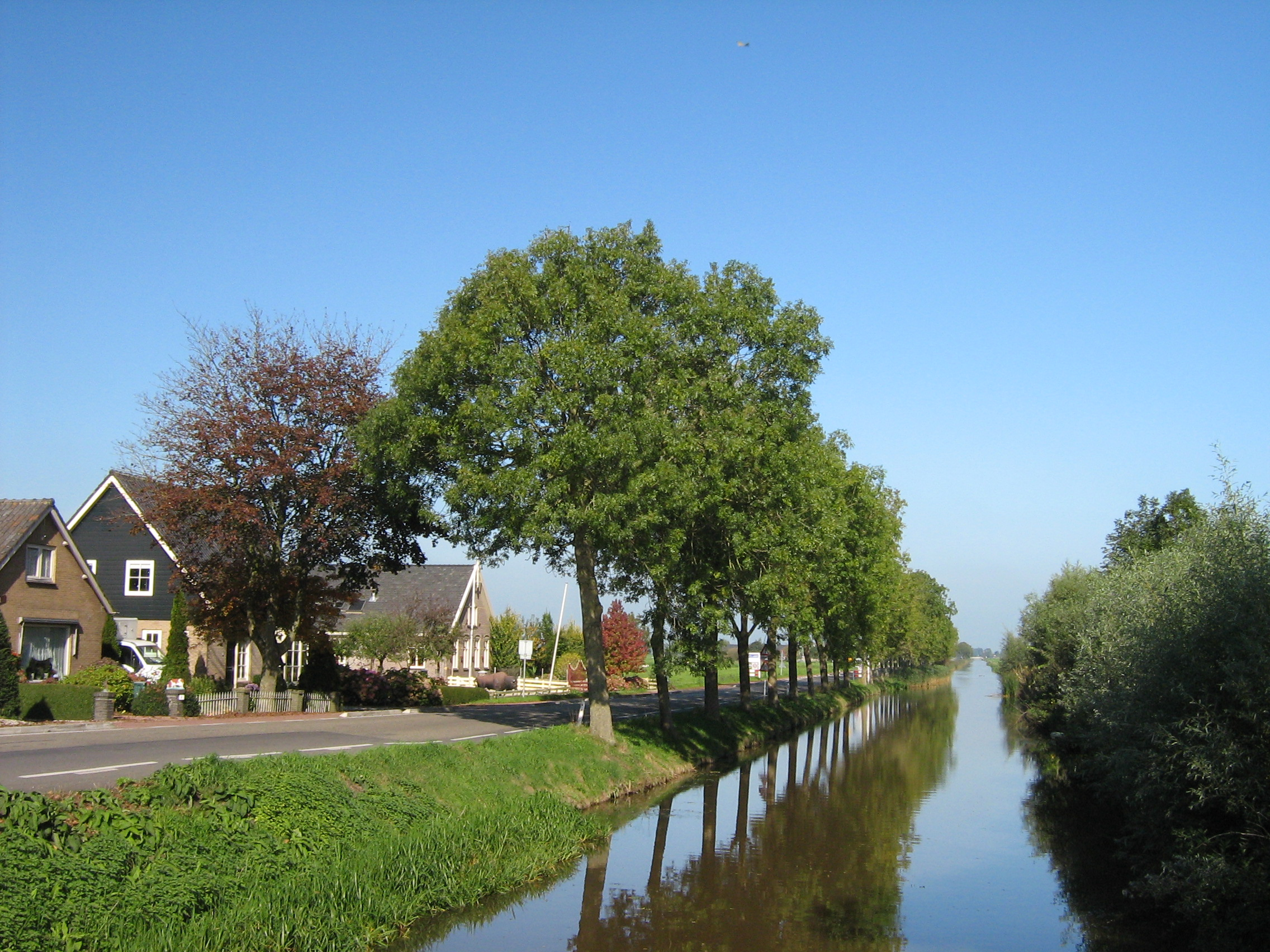
- Houses and canal in Waverveen

- Flag Coat of arms

- Location in the Netherlands Waverveen (Netherlands)
- Coordinates: 52°13′52″N 4°50′6″E
- Country: Netherlands
- Province: Utrecht
- Municipality: De Ronde Venen

Area
  - Total: 12.37 km^{2} (4.78 sq mi)
- Elevation: −5.5 m (−18 ft)

Population (2021)
  - Total: 815
  - Density: 65.9/km^{2} (171/sq mi)
- Time zone: UTC+1 (CET)
  - Summer (DST): UTC+2 (CEST)
- Postal code: 3646
- Dialing code: 0297

Waverveen is a village in the Dutch province of Utrecht. It is located in the municipality of De Ronde Venen, 3 km west of Vinkeveen.

Waverveen was a separate municipality until 1841, when it was merged with Vinkeveen to form the municipality of Vinkeveen en Waverveen. Until 1 October 1819, Waverveen was part of Holland. The economy is mainly based on agriculture.

It was first mentioned in 1339 as "toit Waverveen", and means "moorland of the Waver (river)". In 1672, French troops entered the village and demanded hay for their horses. They were not satisfied by the amount of hay, therefore, burnt to the village and killed several inhabitants. In 1840, it was home to 484 people.

== Gallery ==
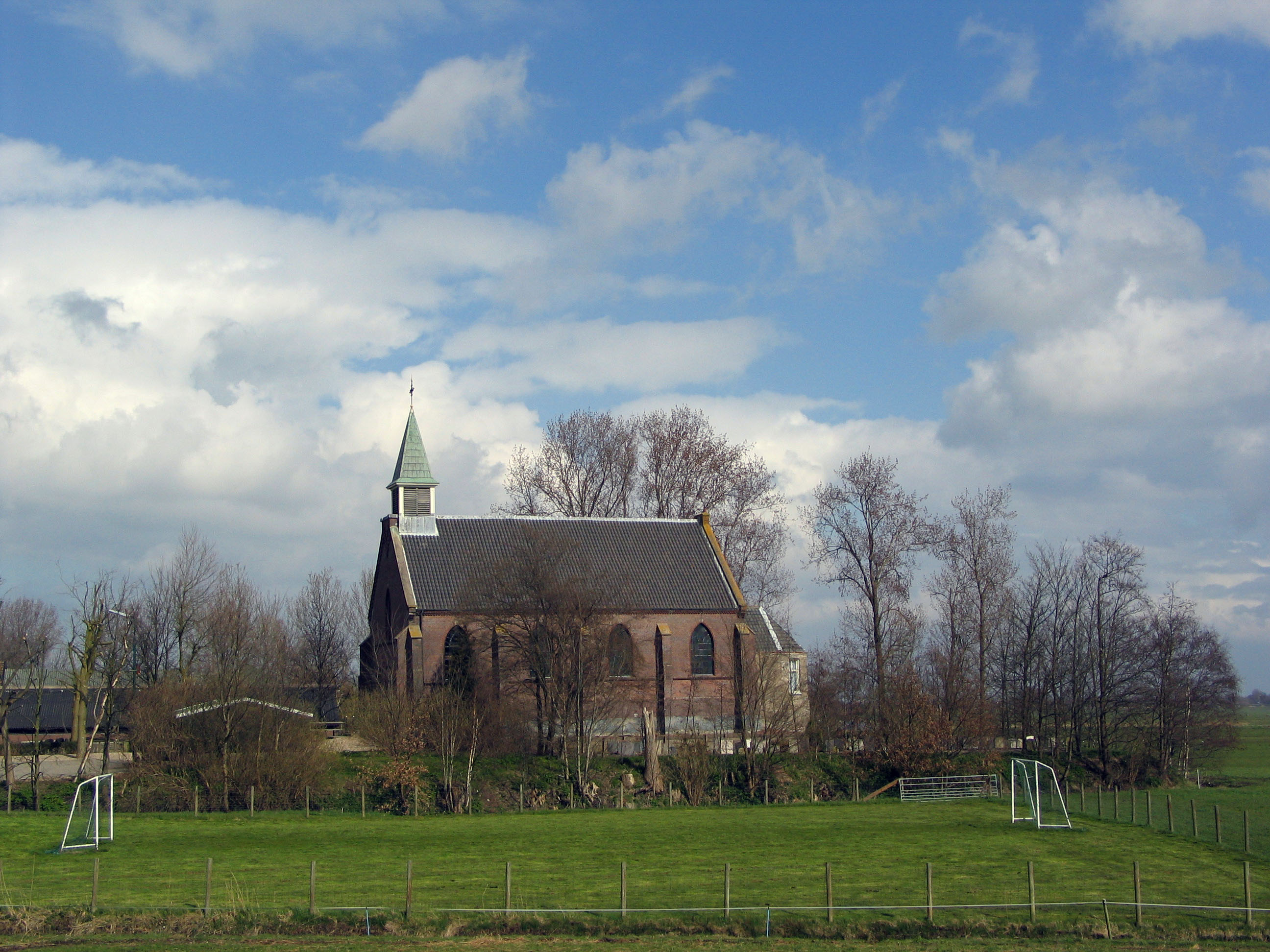
Church of Waverveen

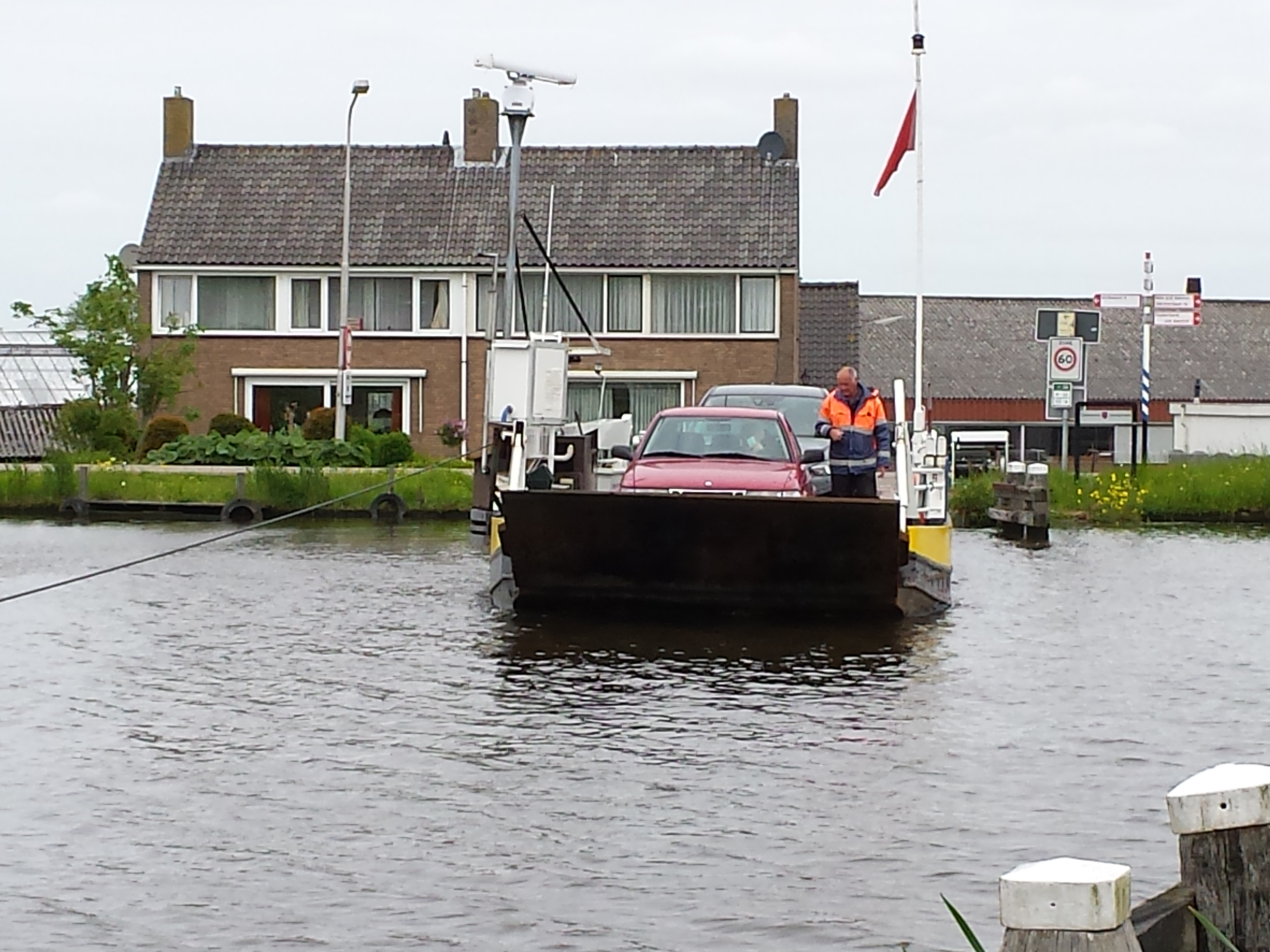
Ferry across the canal

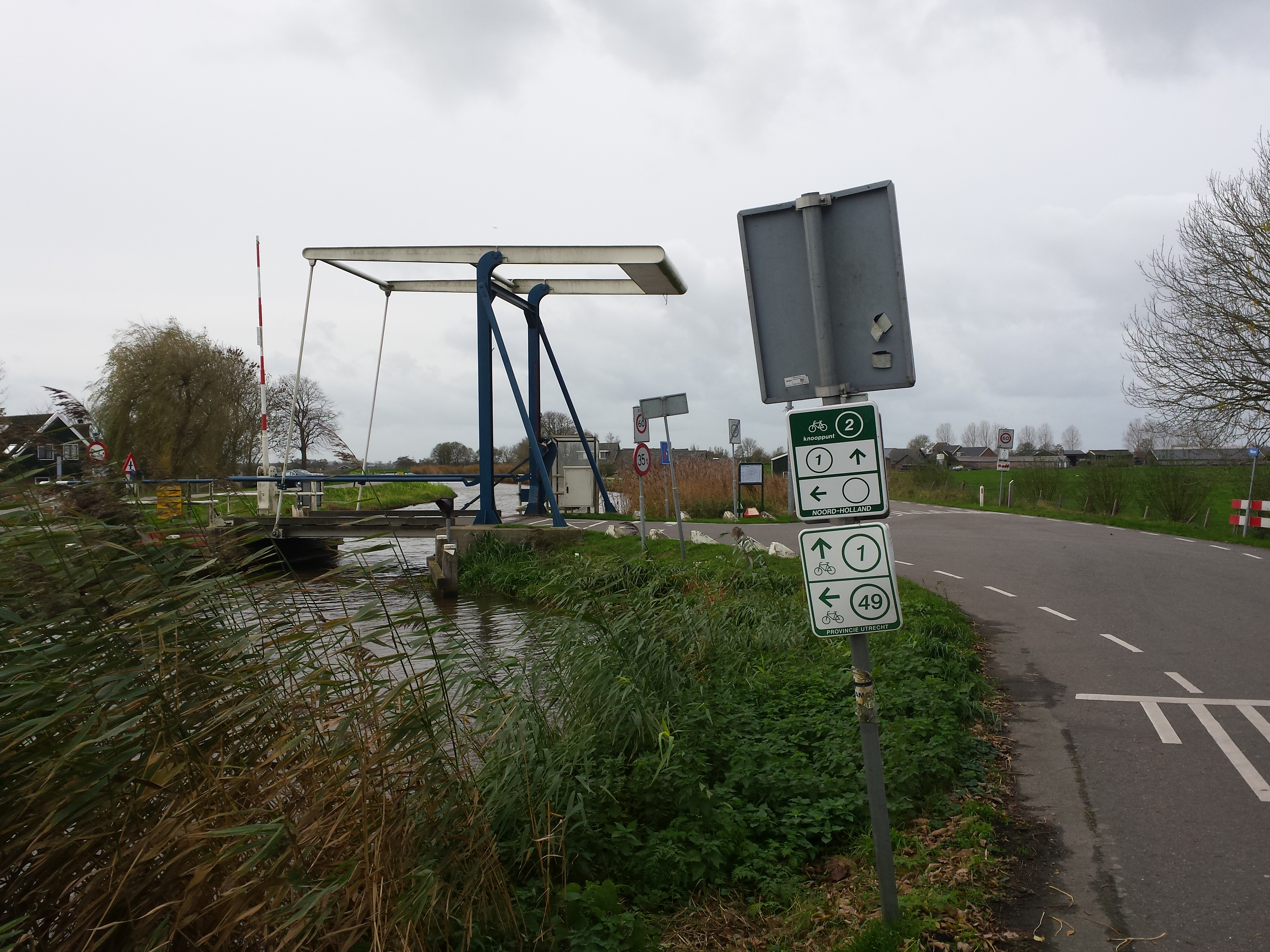
Bridge in Waverveen

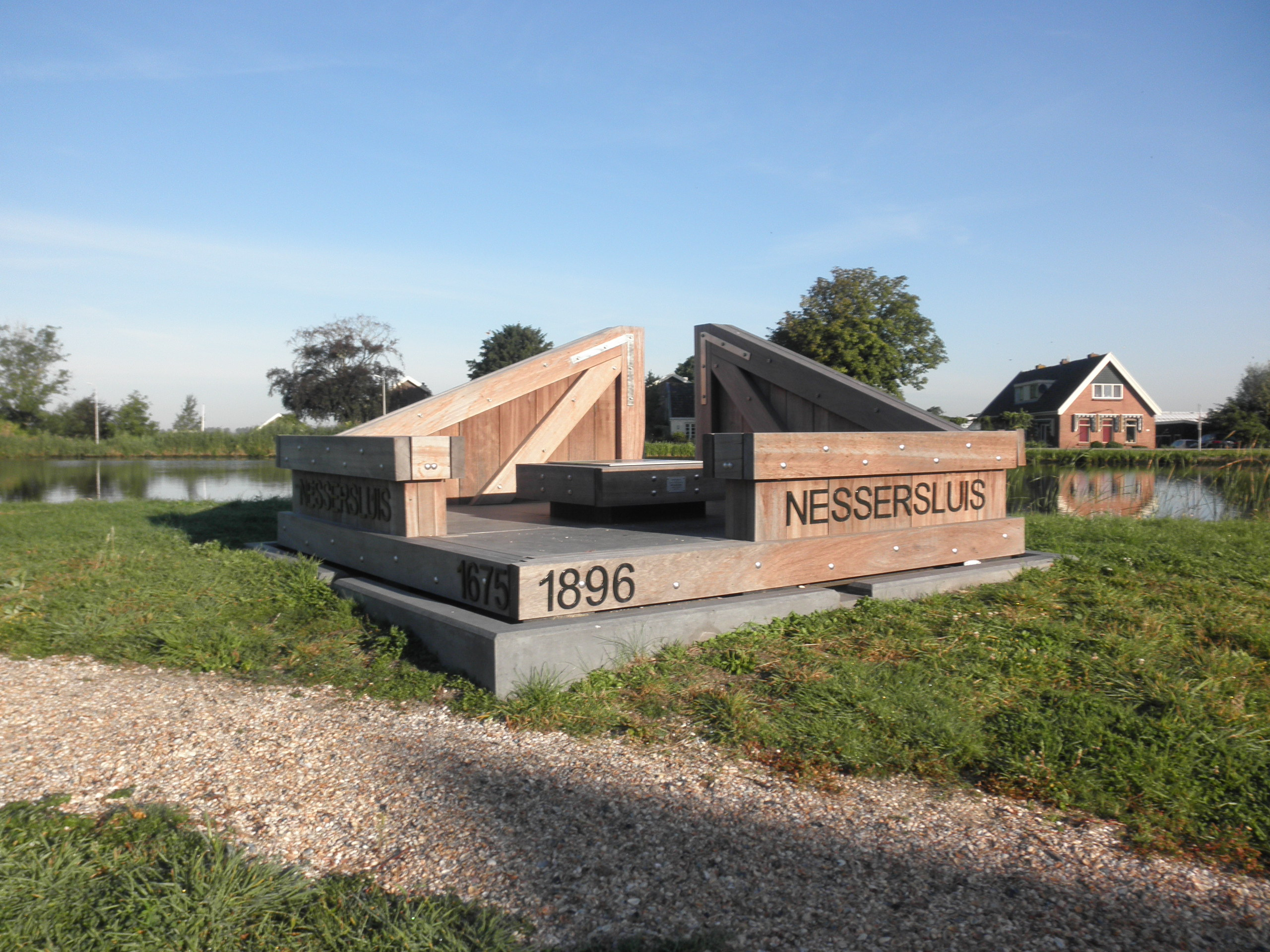
Nessersluis monument
