= De Ronde Venen =

- Municipality
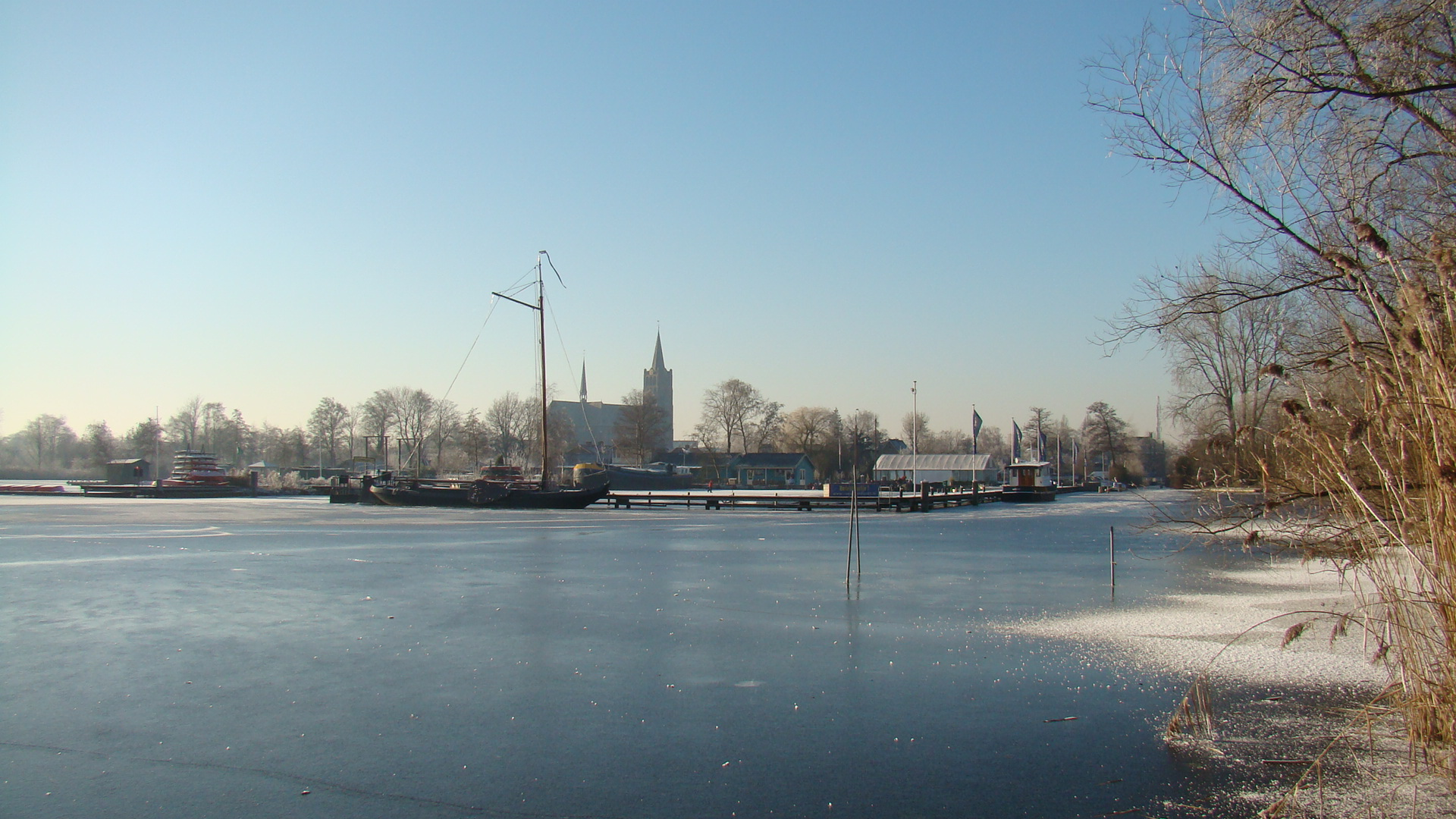
- Vinkeveen town centre

- Flag Coat of arms

- Location in Utrecht
- Coordinates: 52°12′N 4°52′E
- Country: Netherlands
- Province: Utrecht
- Established: 1 January 1989

Government
  - Body: Municipal council
  - Mayor: Rosan Kocken (GL)

Area
  - Total: 116.98 km^{2} (45.17 sq mi)
  - Land: 99.92 km^{2} (38.58 sq mi)
  - Water: 17.06 km^{2} (6.59 sq mi)
- Elevation: −2 m (−6.6 ft)

Population (January 2021)
  - Total: 44,720
  - Density: 448/km^{2} (1,160/sq mi)
- Time zone: UTC+1 (CET)
  - Summer (DST): UTC+2 (CEST)
- Postcode: Parts of 1300, 1400 and 3600 ranges
- Area code: 0294, 0297
- Website: www.derondevenen.nl

De Ronde Venen (Dutch pronunciation: [də ˈrɔndə ˈveːnə(n)]; lit. 'the round peat bogs') is a municipality in the Netherlands, in the province of Utrecht. On 1 January 2011, the municipality of Abcoude was amalgamated into De Ronde Venen.

== Population centres ==
The municipality of De Ronde Venen consists of the villages Abcoude, Amstelhoek, De Hoef, Baambrugge, Mijdrecht, Vinkeveen, Waverveen, and Wilnis, and a number of hamlets, such as Aan de Zuwe, Achterbos, and Stokkelaarsbrug.

=== Topography ===
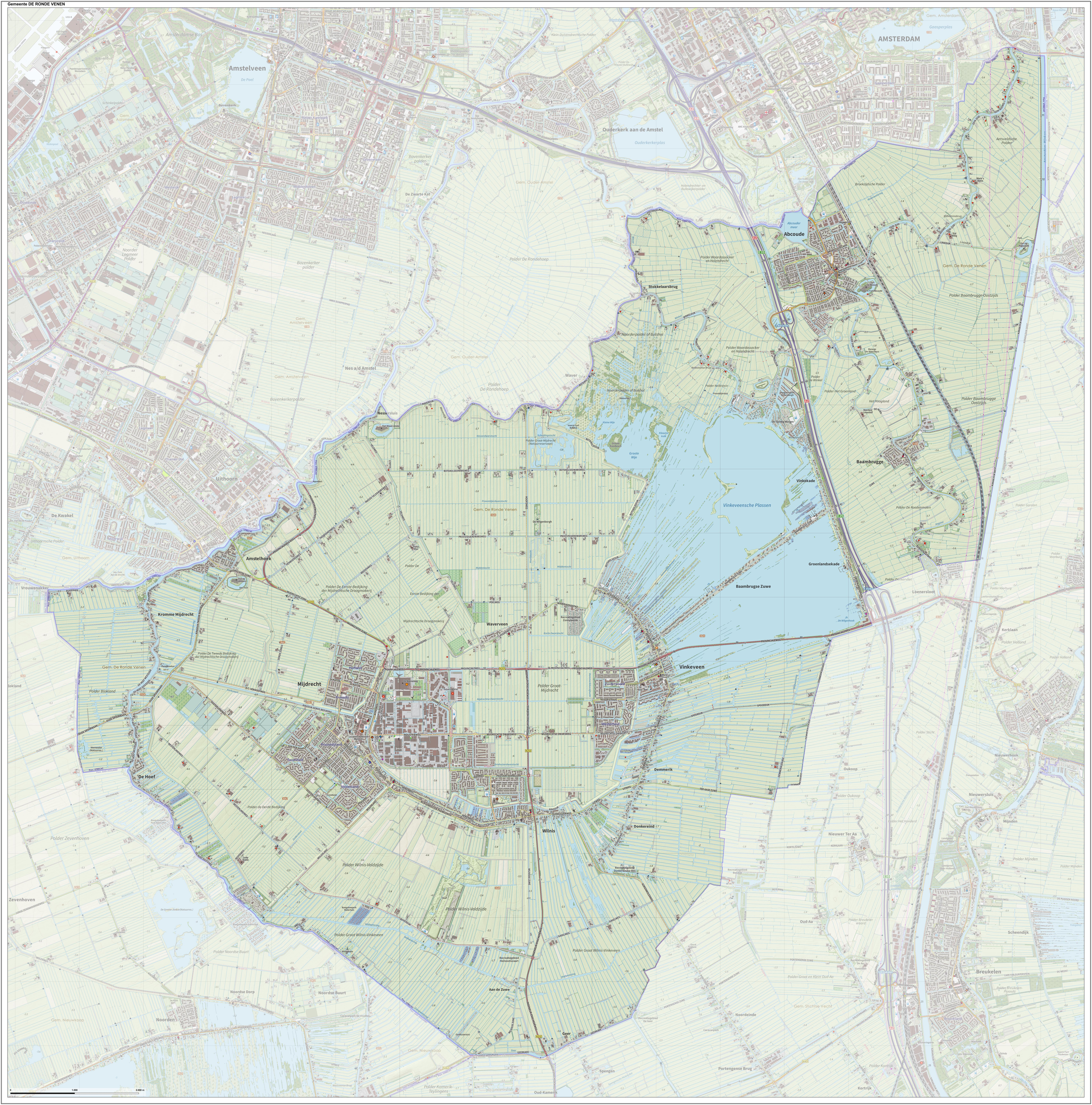

Dutch Topographic map of the municipality of De Ronde Venen, June 2015

== Notable people ==
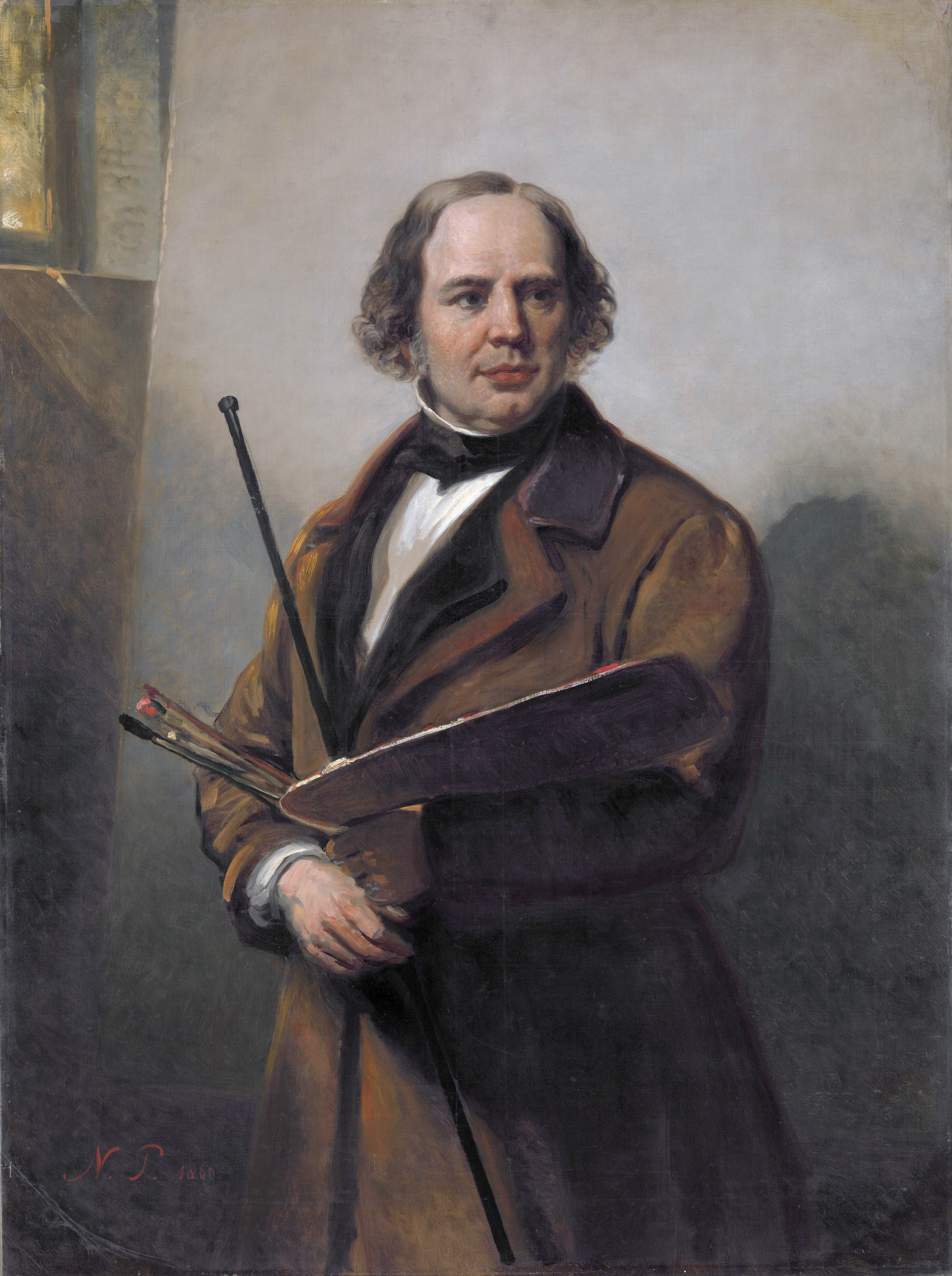
Jan Willem Pieneman, 1860

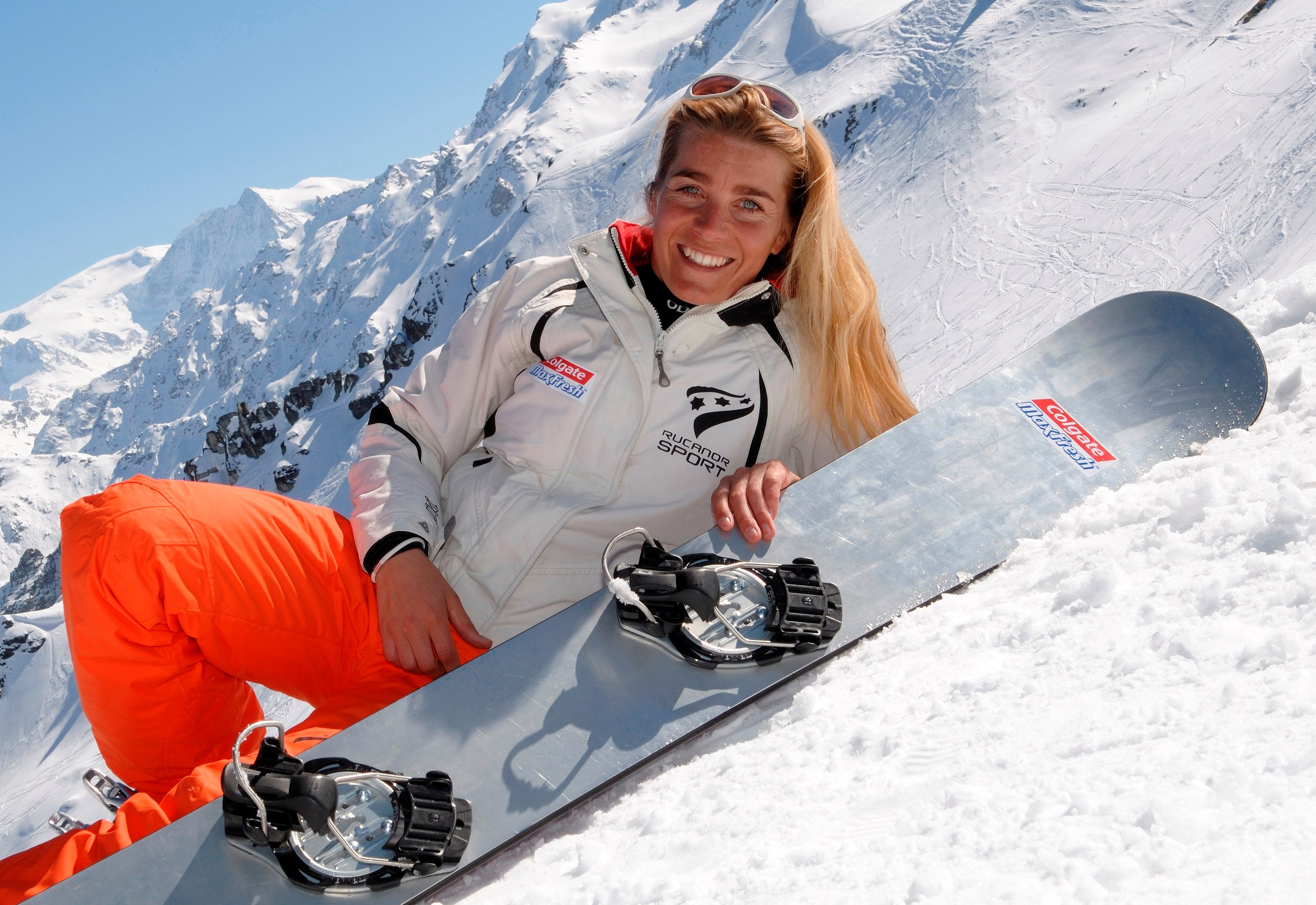
Nicolien Sauerbreij

- Jan van Almeloveen (1656 in Mijdrecht – 1684) a Dutch painter, engraver and draughtsman
- Theodorus Janssonius van Almeloveen (1657 in Mijdrecht – 1712) a Dutch physician and medical editor
- Jan Willem Pieneman (1779 in Abcoude – 1853) a painter
- Werenfried van Straaten (1913 in Mijdrecht – 2003) a Dutch Roman Catholic priest and social activist
- Hans van Vliet (born 1949 in Mijdrecht) a Dutch computer scientist and academic
- Michaël Dudok de Wit (born 1953 in Abcoude) a Dutch animator, director and illustrator
- Saskia Rao-de Haas (born 1971 in Abcoude) a virtuoso cellist and composer

=== Sport ===
- Jan Grijseels (1890 in Abcoude-Proosdij – 1961) a Dutch track and field athlete, who competed in the 1912 Summer Olympics
- Gerard Maarse (1929 in Wilnis – 1989) a Dutch speed skater, competed in the 1952 & 1956 Winter Olympics
- Christine Aaftink (born 1966 in Abcoude) a retired speed skater, competed at the 1988, 1992 and 1994 Winter Olympics
- Tom Cordes (born 1966 in Wilnis) a retired Dutch cyclist, competed at the 1988 Summer Olympics
- Nicolien Sauerbreij (born 1979 in De Hoef) a Dutch professional snowboarder, competed in the 2002 & 2006 Winter Olympic Games and was a gold medal in the 2010 Winter Olympics
- Ivo Snijders (born 1980 in Mijdrecht) a rower, competed in the 2004 & 2008 Summer Olympics

== Gallery ==
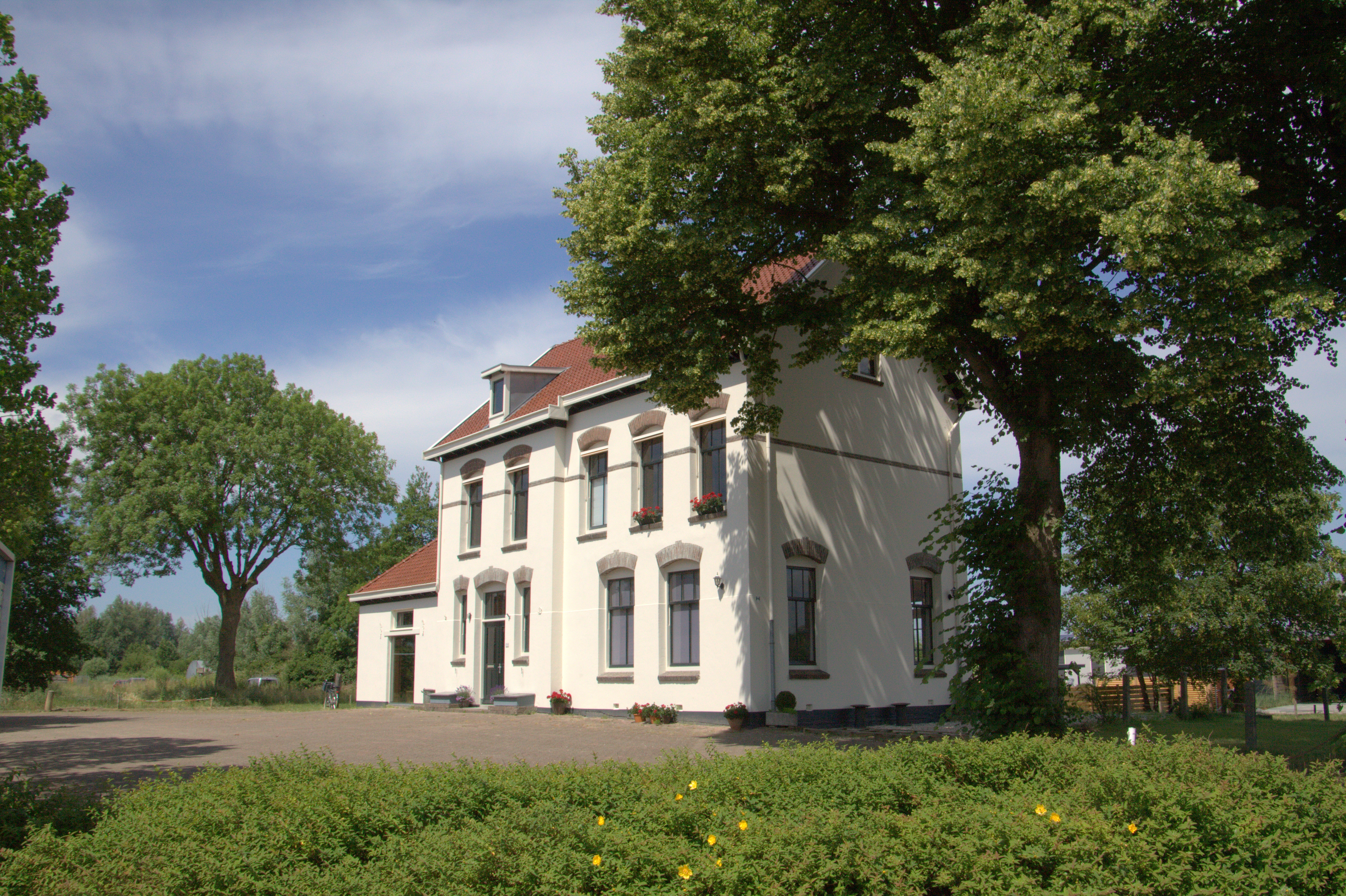
Het Oude station van Vinkeveen

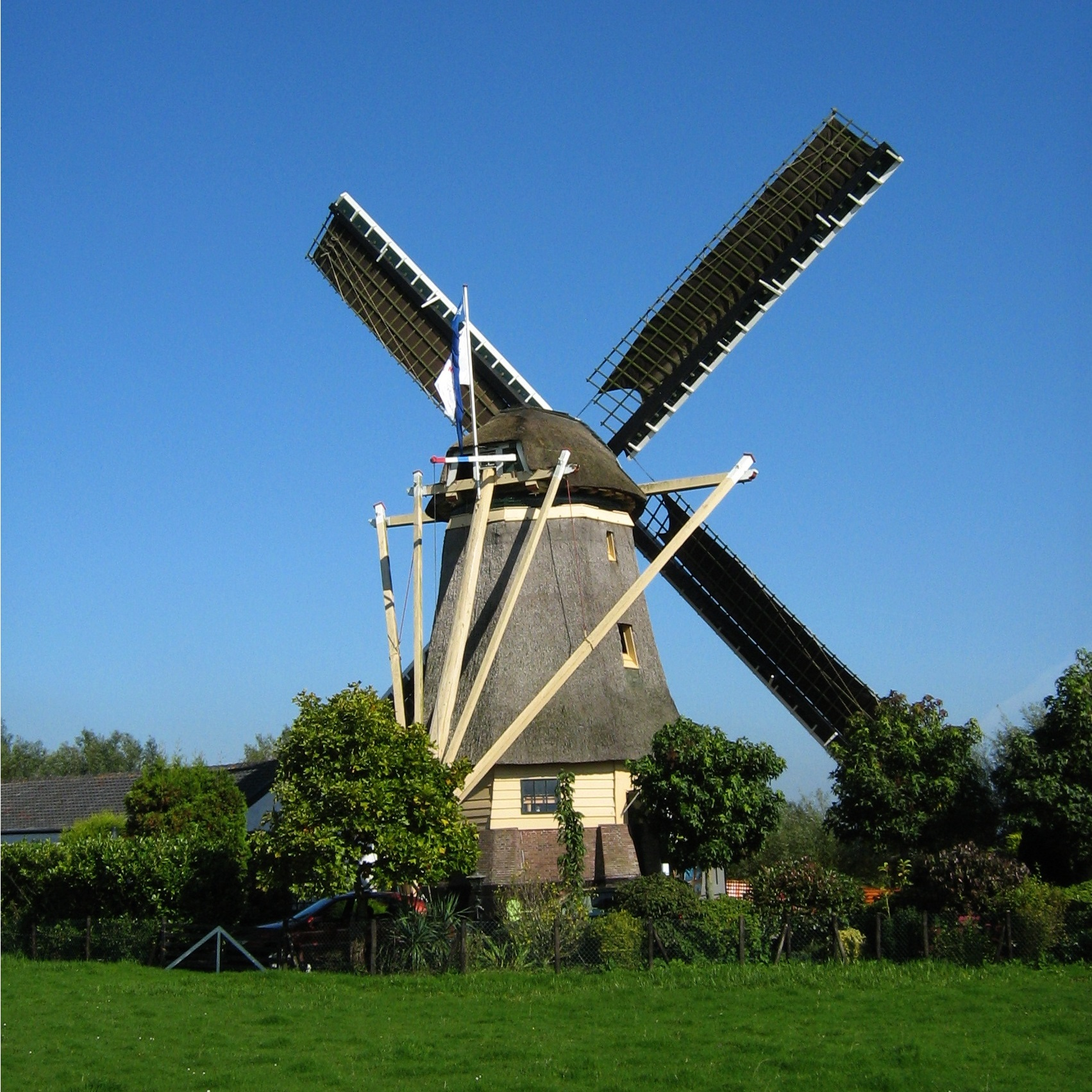
Windmill Wilnis

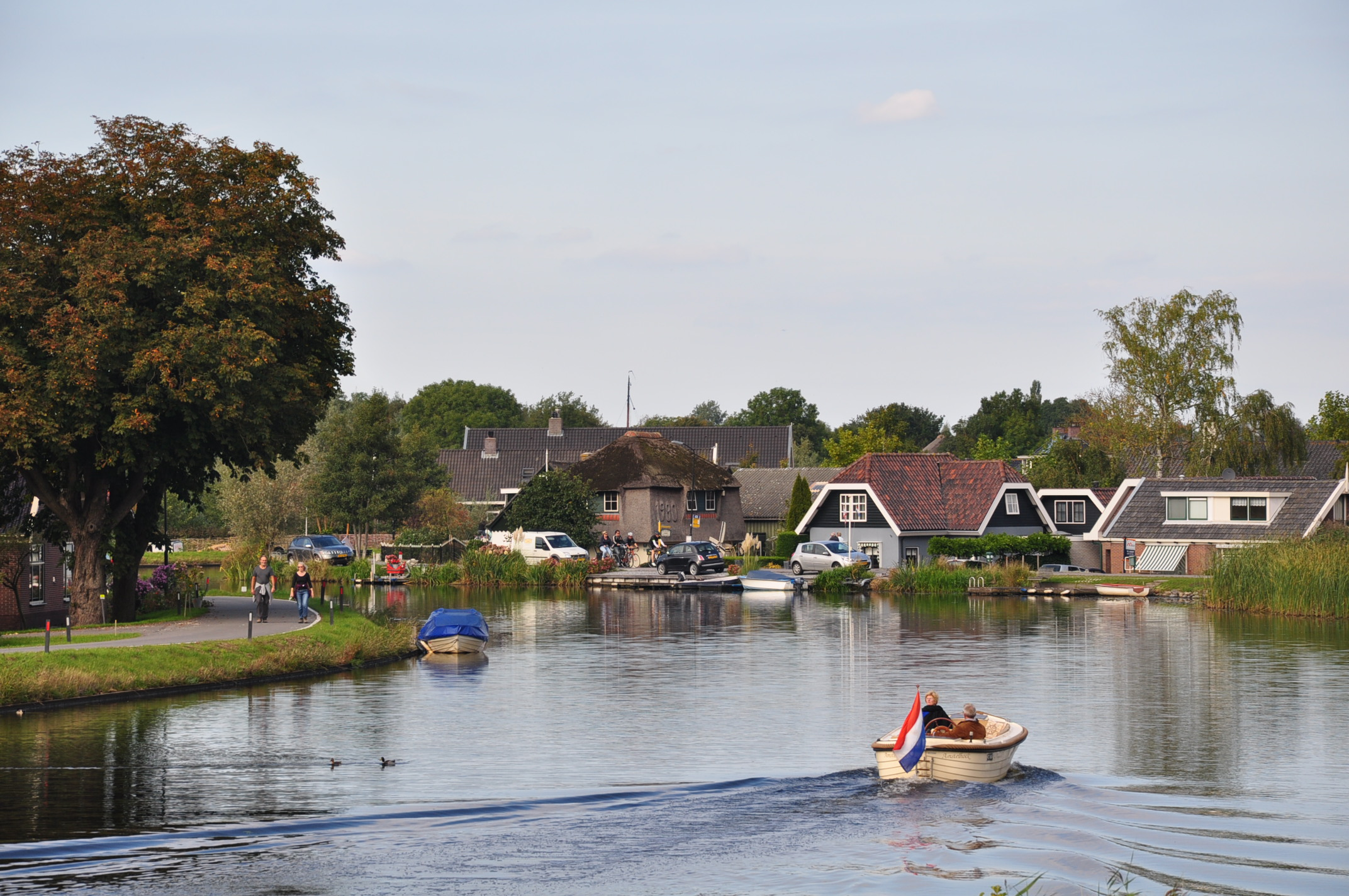
Netherlands, Ronde Venen, Kromme Mijdrecht

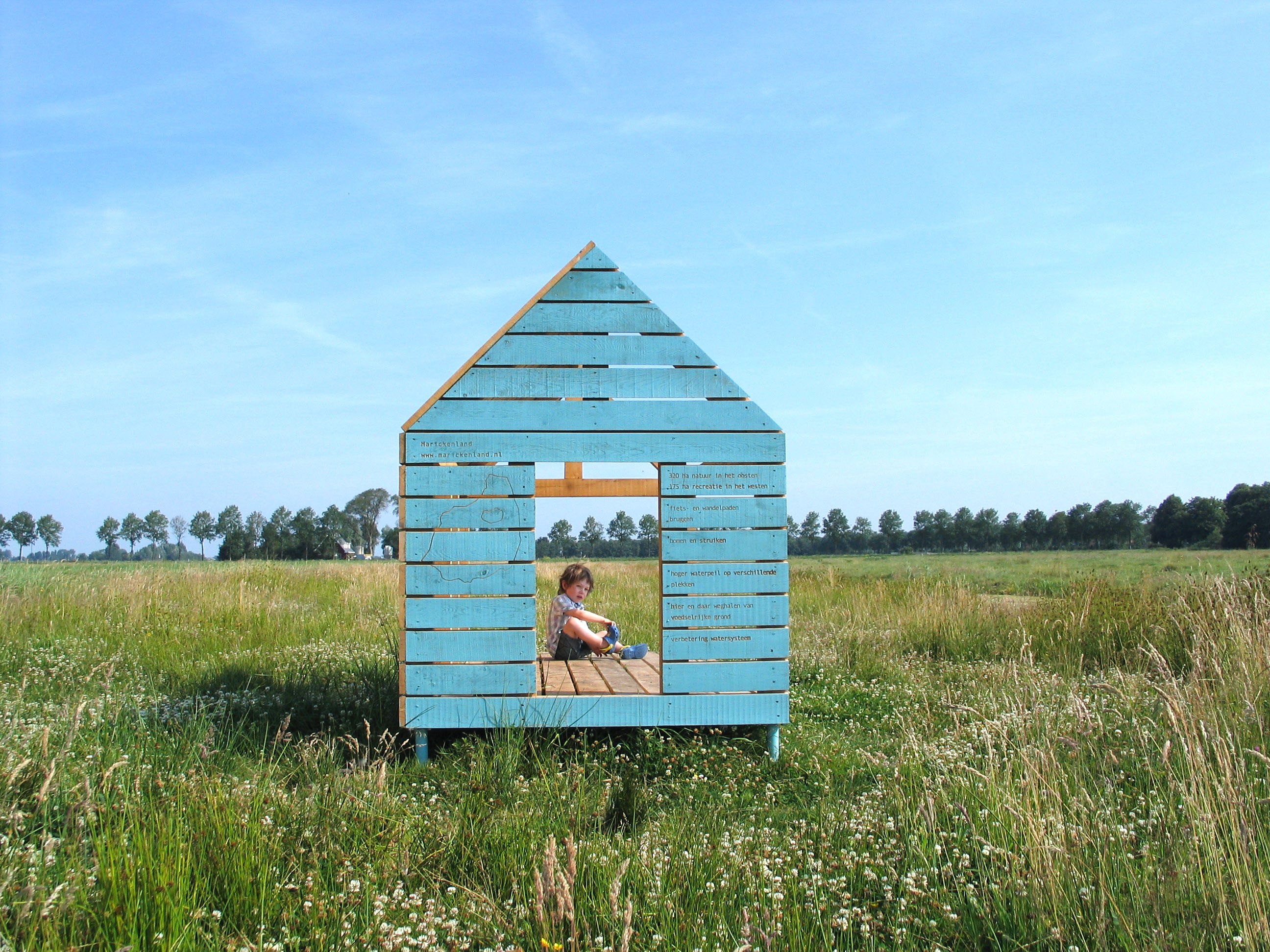
Wilnis-Vinkeveen Platform 4, Jan Konings

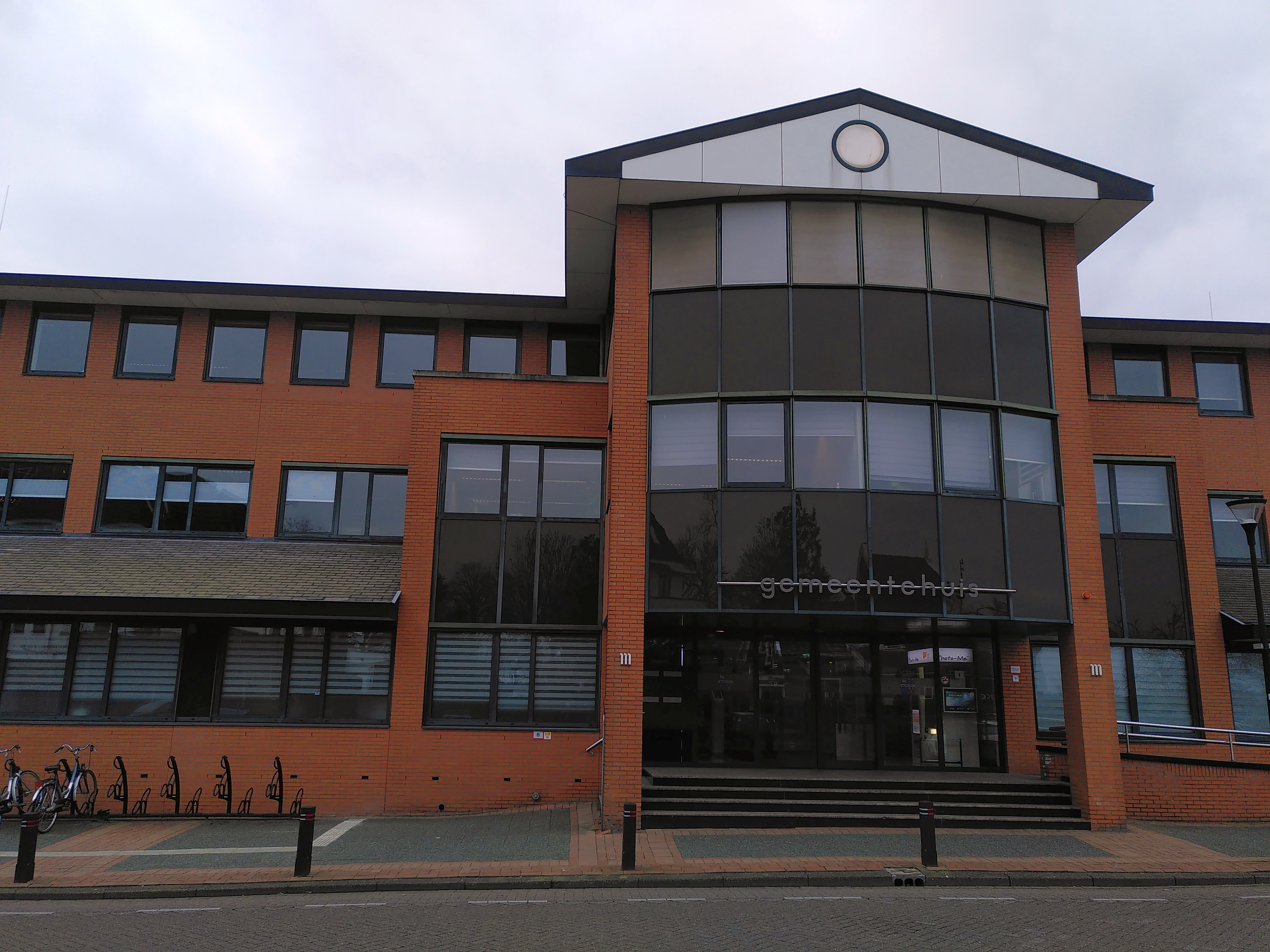
The town hall of the municipality of De Ronde Venen, located in Mijdrecht.
