= Vinkeveen =

- Village
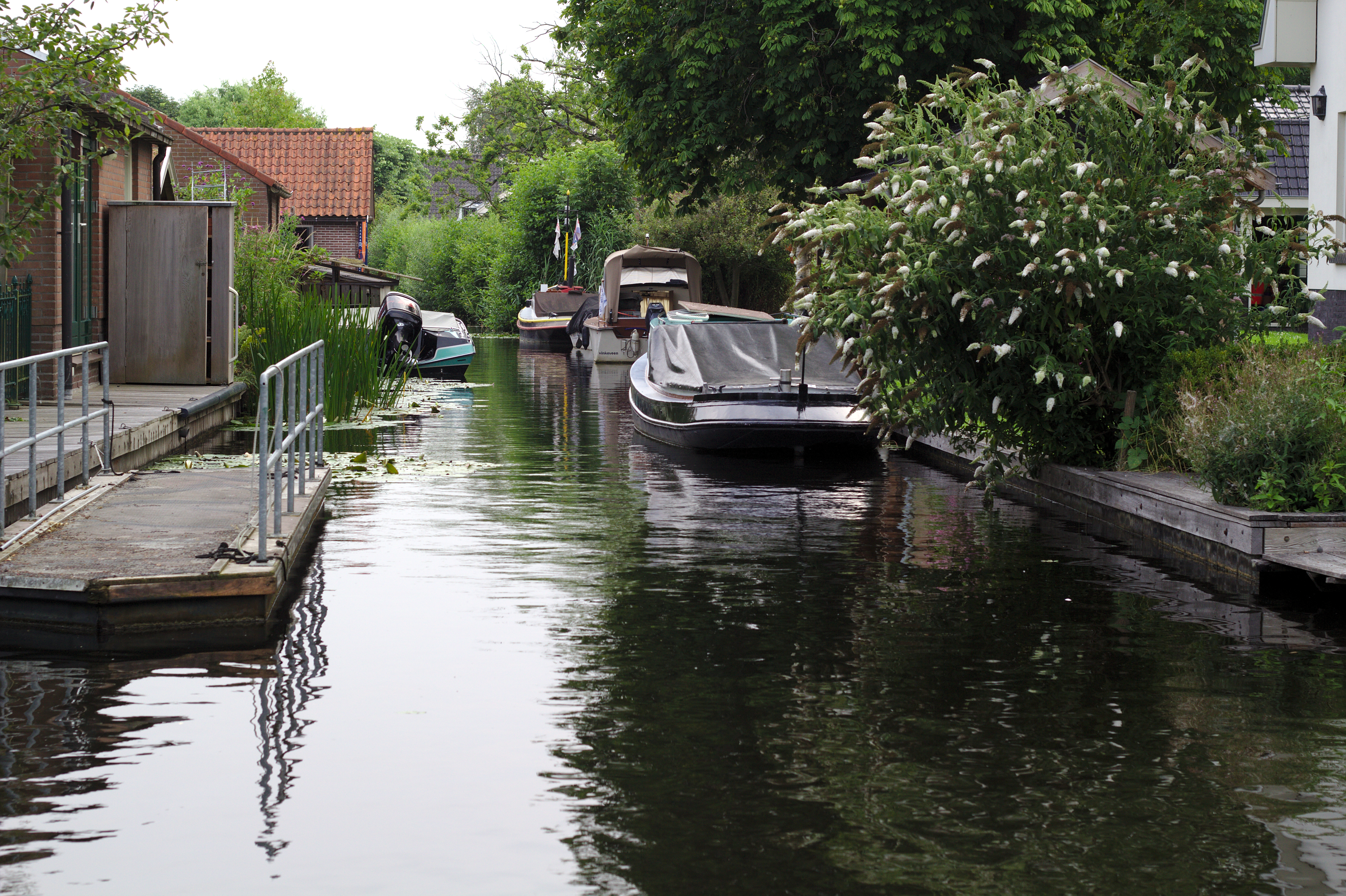
- Canal access to houses

- Flag Coat of arms

- Location in the Netherlands Vinkeveen (Netherlands)
- Coordinates: 52°12′46″N 4°55′38″E
- Country: Netherlands
- Province: Utrecht
- Municipality: De Ronde Venen

Area
  - Total: 25.58 km^{2} (9.88 sq mi)
- Elevation: −1.8 m (−5.9 ft)

Population (2023)
  - Total: 9,545
  - Density: 373.1/km^{2} (966.4/sq mi)
- Time zone: UTC+1 (CET)
  - Summer (DST): UTC+2 (CEST)
- Postal code: 3645
- Dialing code: 0297

Vinkeveen is a village in the Dutch province of Utrecht. It is a part of the municipality of De Ronde Venen, and lies about 18 km south of Amsterdam.

Vinkeveen used to be a separate municipality. It merged with Waverveen in 1841, to form the municipality Vinkeveen en Waverveen. In 1989 there was a reorganisation of local governments, and Vinkeveen became a part of De Ronde Venen.

The Vinkeveense Plassen (Lakes of Vinkeveen), an area of lakes and sand islands east of the village, is an important recreational area, with facilities for swimming, diving and yachting. A permit is required for recreational diving in the lake. There is a marina on the north shore of the lakes.

== History ==
It was first mentioned between 1395 and 1396 as Vinkenveen, and means "moorland with low quality peat". The village started as a peat excavation settlement. In 1840, it was home to 903 people. The Catholic Holy Heart Church was built between 1880 and 1883.

== Gallery ==
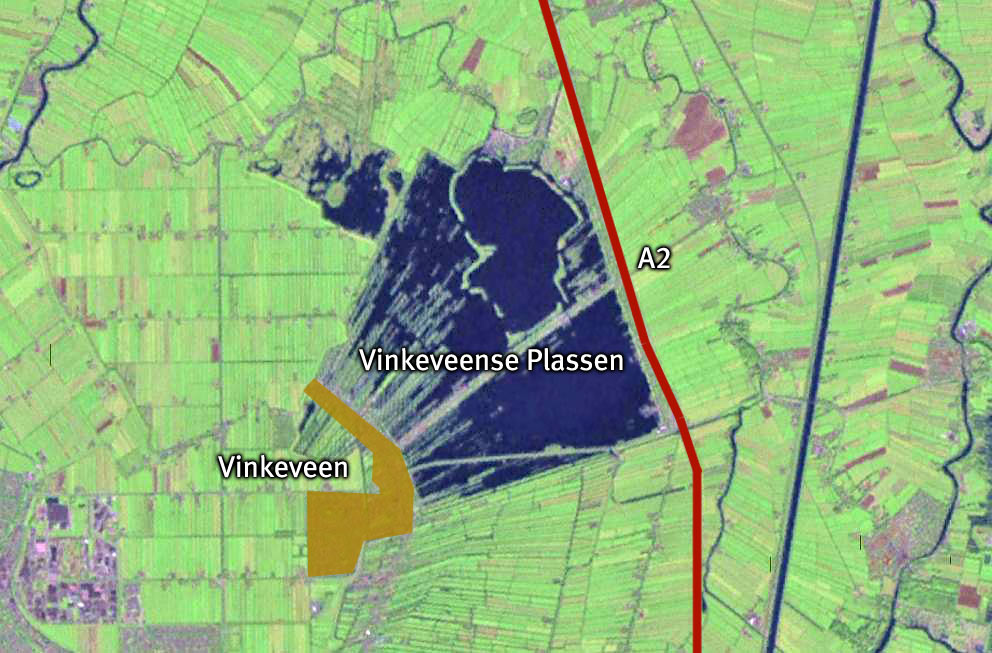
Satellite image of Vinkeveen and the Vinkeveense Plassen, retrieved in October, 2005 -- note that as of August 2021, the boundaries of Vinkeveen have expanded, considerably.

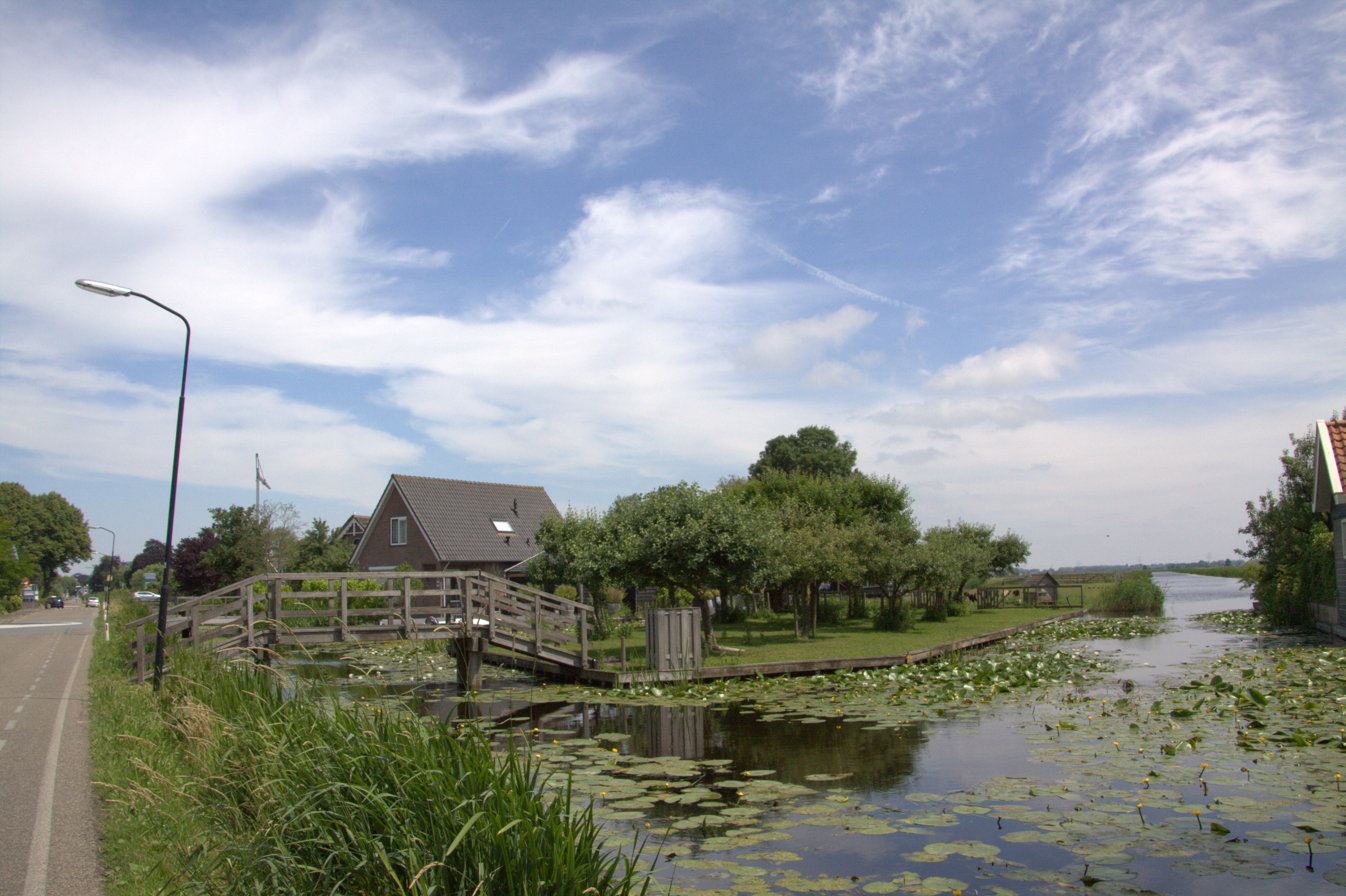
The landscape with wide waters and narrow roads in the hamlet of Demmerik in Vinkeveen Gem De Ronde Venen.

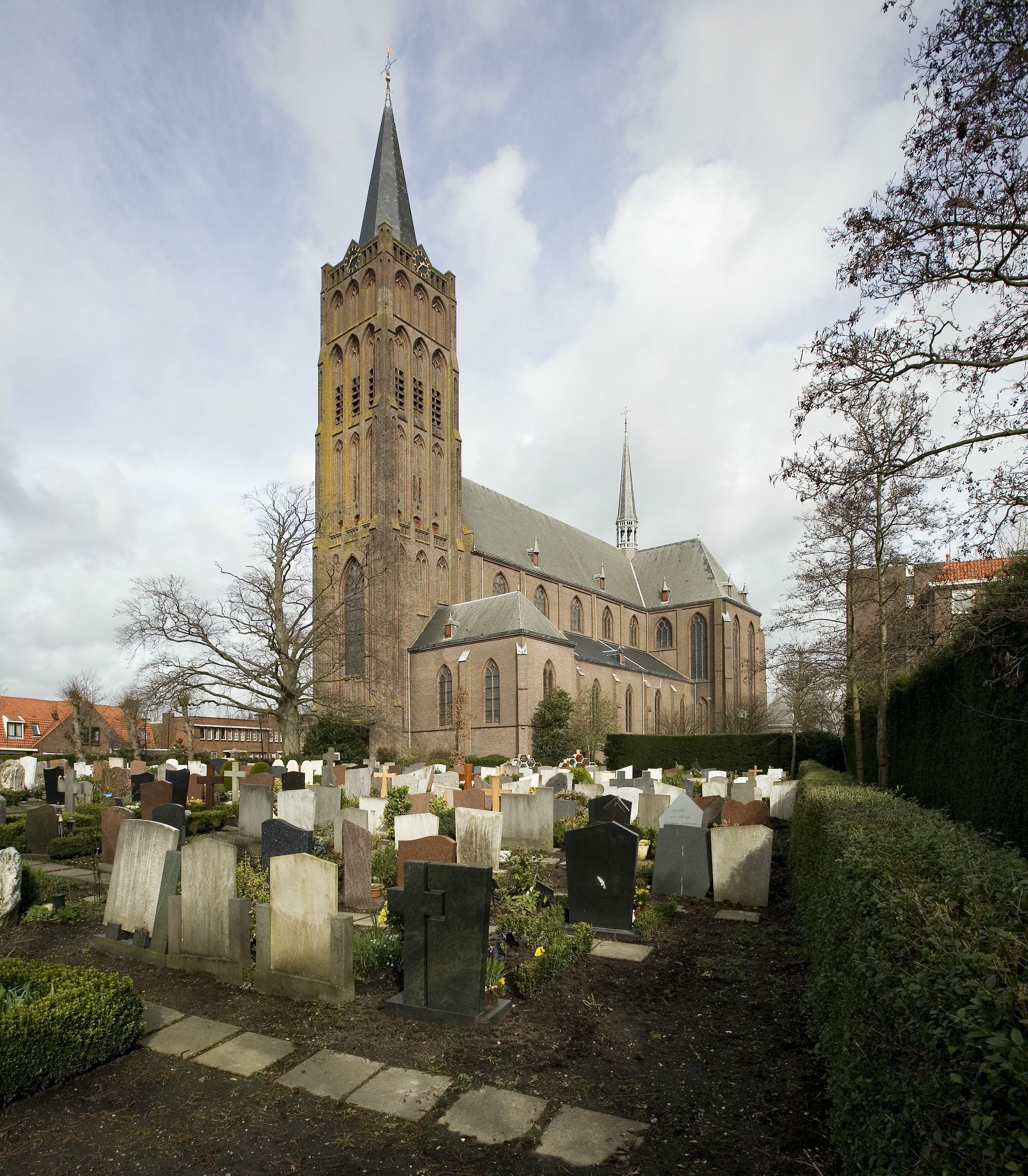
A church in Vinkeveen

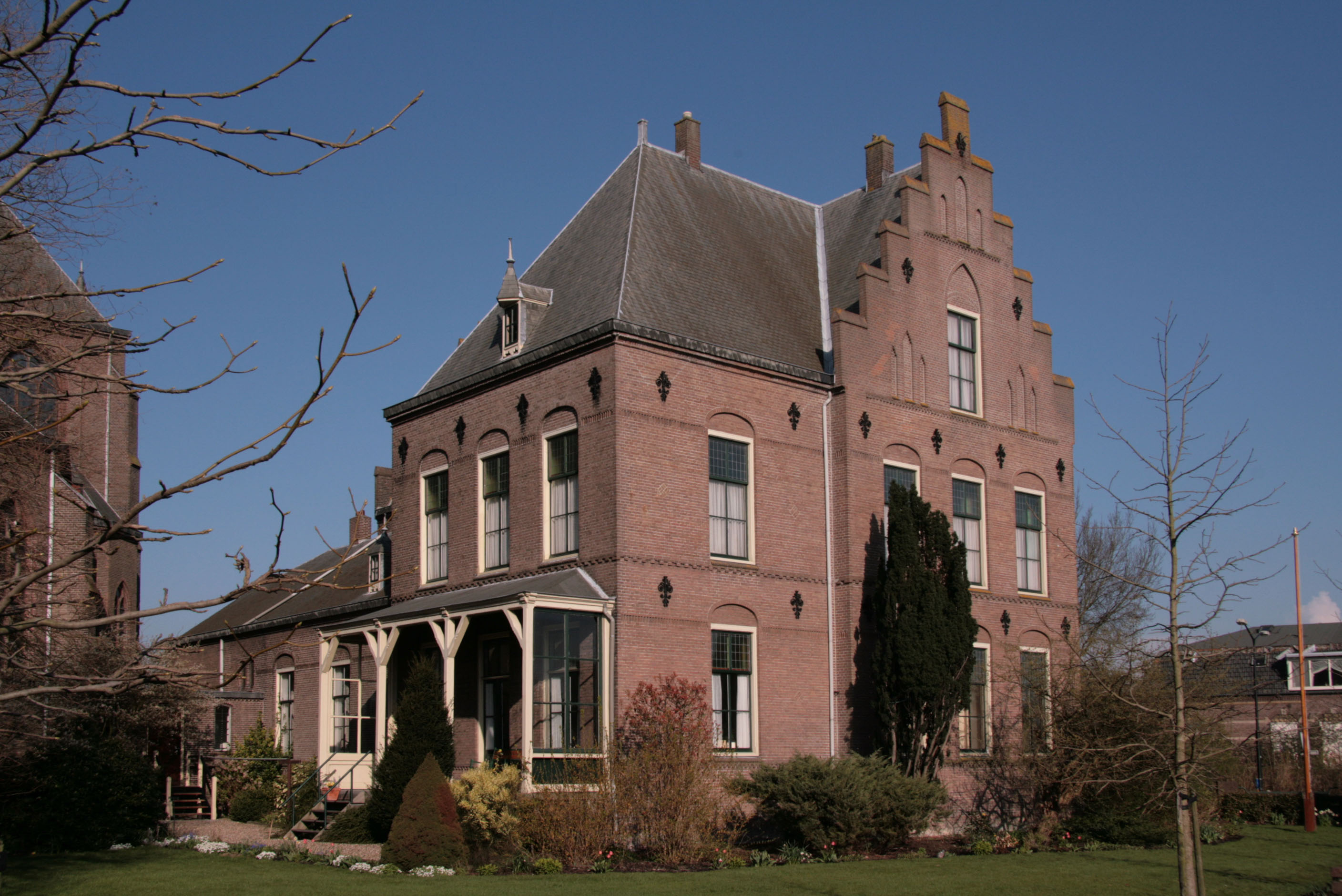
An historical monument in Vinkeveen
