= List of cities, towns and villages in Utrecht =

This is a list of towns, cities, and villages in the province of Utrecht in the Netherlands.

Name	Municipality	Coordinates	
Aan de Zuwe	De Ronde Venen	52°10′20″N 4°54′05″E	
Abcoude	De Ronde Venen	52°16′20″N 4°58′10″E	
Achterberg	Rhenen	51°58′20″N 5°35′15″E	
Achterbos	De Ronde Venen	52°13′30″N 4°55′35″E	
Achterdijk	Vijfheerenlanden	51°53′30″N 5°02′20″E	
Achterveld	Leusden	52°08′10″N 5°29′50″E	
Achterwetering	De Bilt	52°09′05″N 5°09′10″E	
Achthoven	Vijfheerenlanden	51°58′05″N 4°59′35″E	
Achthoven-Oost	Montfoort	52°03′20″N 5°00′10″E	
Achthoven-West	Montfoort	52°03′25″N 4°59′05″E	
Achttienhoven	De Bilt	52°09′00″N 5°10′00″E	(VUGA, 1997)
Alendorp	Utrecht	52°05′35″N 5°02′05″E	
Ameide	Vijfheerenlanden	51°57′20″N 4°57′45″E	
Amerongen	Utrechtse Heuvelrug	52°00′10″N 5°27′35″E	
Amersfoort	Amersfoort	52°09′20″N 5°23′15″E	
Amstelhoek	De Ronde Venen	52°13′50″N 4°50′00″E	
Asschat	Leusden	52°07′55″N 5°27′20″E	
Austerlitz	Zeist	52°04′45″N 5°18′55″E	
Baambrugge	De Ronde Venen	52°14′45″N 4°59′20″E	
Baambrugse Zuwe	De Ronde Venen	52°13′45″N 4°57′05″E	
Baarn	Baarn	52°12′40″N 5°17′15″E	
Barwoutswaarder	Woerden	52°05′05″N 4°51′00″E	
Beerschoten	Utrechtse Heuvelrug	52°03′45″N 5°15′15″E	
Bekenes	Woerden	52°04′40″N 4°50′05″E	
Benedeneind	Veenendaal	52°00′55″N 5°34′50″E	
Benschop	Lopik	52°00′30″N 4°58′50″E	
Bilthoven	De Bilt	52°07′45″N 5°12′05″E	
Blauwkapel	De Bilt	52°06′45″N 5°09′10″E	
Blokland	Montfoort	52°02′10″N 4°57′40″E	
Boeicop	Vijfheerenlanden	51°56′00″N 5°07′00″E	Now part of Hei- en Boeicop.
Bosch en Duin	Zeist	52°07′00″N 5°14′30″E	
Breedeveen	Utrechtse Heuvelrug	52°01′25″N 5°25′05″E	
Breeveld	Woerden	52°06′15″N 4°55′50″E	
Breudijk	Woerden	52°06′10″N 4°57′40″E	
Breukelen	Stichtse Vecht	52°10′30″N 5°00′05″E	
Broek	Vijfheerenlanden	51°55′55″N 4°58′20″E	
Bunnik	Bunnik	52°04′00″N 5°11′55″E	
Bunschoten	Bunschoten	52°14′00″N 5°23′00″E	Now part of Bunschoten-Spakenburg.
Bunschoten-Spakenburg	Bunschoten	52°14′40″N 5°22′20″E	
Buurtsdijk	Amersfoort	52°12′05″N 5°25′45″E	
Cabauw	Lopik	51°57′50″N 4°53′55″E	
Cattenbroek	Montfoort	52°04′00″N 4°56′10″E	
Cothen	Wijk bij Duurstede	51°59′50″N 5°18′30″E	
Darthuizen	Utrechtse Heuvelrug	52°00′45″N 5°23′25″E	
Dashorst	Woudenberg	52°07′00″N 5°29′00″E	Former hamlet.
De Bilt	De Bilt	52°06′35″N 5°10′50″E	
De Birkt	Soest	52°09′40″N 5°19′55″E	
De Brand	Amersfoort	52°11′00″N 5°24′00″E	Former hamlet; now part of Amersfoort
De Bree	Woerden	52°04′50″N 4°49′40″E	
De Bunt	Soest	52°09′00″N 5°20′00″E	Former hamlet.
De Glashut	Stichtse Vecht	52°13′05″N 5°01′55″E	
De Groep	Utrechtse Heuvelrug	52°03′05″N 5°30′15″E	
De Heul	Houten	51°59′00″N 5°14′00″E	(VUGA 1997)
De Hoef	De Ronde Venen	52°12′05″N 4°48′55″E	
De Meern	Utrecht	52°04′55″N 5°02′10″E	
Demmerik	De Ronde Venen	52°12′15″N 4°55′55″E	
Den Bosch	De Ronde Venen	52°11′00″N 4°57′00″E	Former hamlet.
Den Dolder	Zeist	52°08′20″N 5°14′20″E	
Den Ham	Amersfoort	52°11′00″N 5°24′00″E	Former hamlet; now part of Amersfoort.
Den Oord	Wijk bij Duurstede	51°58′15″N 5°16′15″E	
Den Treek	Leusden	52°06′15″N 5°23′25″E	
De Ruif	Leusden	52°09′25″N 5°26′35″E	
Diefdijk	Vijfheerenlanden	51°54′50″N 5°07′50″E	
Diemerbroek	Oudewater	52°03′10″N 4°51′45″E	
Donkereind	De Ronde Venen	52°11′30″N 4°55′30″E	
Donkervliet	De Ronde Venen	52°14′00″N 5°00′00″E	Former hamlet.
Doorn	Utrechtse Heuvelrug	52°02′15″N 5°20′30″E	
Driebergen	Utrechtse Heuvelrug	52°03′00″N 5°17′00″E	Now part of Driebergen-Rijsenburg.
Driebergen-Rijsenburg	Utrechtse Heuvelrug	52°03′15″N 5°16′50″E	
Dwarsdijk	Wijk bij Duurstede	51°59′20″N 5°16′50″E	
Eembrugge	Eemnes	52°13′35″N 5°18′35″E	
Eemdijk	Bunschoten	52°15′20″N 5°19′50″E	
Eemnes	Eemnes	52°15′15″N 5°15′40″E	
Elst	Rhenen	51°59′15″N 5°29′50″E	
Emminkhuizen	Renswoude	52°03′05″N 5°31′45″E	
Everdingen	Vijfheerenlanden	51°57′55″N 5°09′20″E	
Geer, De Ronde Venen	De Ronde Venen	52°09′50″N 4°54′50″E	
Geer, Vijfheerenlanden	Vijfheerenlanden	51°54′10″N 5°02′45″E	
Geerestein	Woudenberg	52°05′00″N 5°25′00″E	Former hamlet.
Geestdorp	Woerden	52°05′50″N 4°54′25″E	
Gemaal	De Ronde Venen	52°15′10″N 4°54′15″E	
Gerverscop	Woerden	52°07′05″N 4°57′00″E	
Gieltjesdorp	Stichtse Vecht	52°08′00″N 4°59′00″E	(VUGA, 1997)
Goyse Dorp	Houten	52°00′00″N 5°13′00″E	Former hamlet.
Graaf	Lopik	51°58′50″N 4°58′45″E	
Groenekan	De Bilt	52°07′25″N 5°09′10″E	
Groenlandsekade	De Ronde Venen	52°13′55″N 4°58′40″E	
Grote Melm	Soest	52°11′30″N 5°18′35″E	
Haagje	Utrechtse Heuvelrug	52°04′00″N 5°16′20″E	
Haanwijk	Woerden	52°06′00″N 4°57′00″E	Former hamlet.
Haarzuilens	Utrecht	52°07′15″N 4°59′50″E	
Hagestein	Vijfheerenlanden	51°58′50″N 5°07′20″E	
Harmelen	Woerden	52°05′25″N 4°57′40″E	
Harmelerwaard	Woerden	52°05′20″N 4°59′00″E	
Haspel	Utrechtse Heuvelrug	52°01′55″N 5°31′10″E	
Heemstede	Houten	52°02′05″N 5°07′30″E	
Hees	Soest	52°09′45″N 5°16′25″E	
Heeswijk	Montfoort	52°03′05″N 4°58′10″E	
Hei- en Boeicop	Vijfheerenlanden	51°56′45″N 5°04′55″E	
Hekendorp	Oudewater	52°00′55″N 4°48′30″E	
Helsdingen	Vijfheerenlanden	51°58′40″N 5°03′55″E	
Hoenkoop	Oudewater	52°00′05″N 4°50′30″E	
Hollandsche Rading	De Bilt	52°10′30″N 5°10′40″E	
Honswijk	Houten	51°58′20″N 5°10′45″E	
Hoogeind	Vijfheerenlanden	51°54′50″N 5°05′15″E	
Hoogewaard	Vijfheerenlanden	51°57′15″N 4°57′20″E	
Hoogland	Amersfoort	52°10′55″N 5°22′25″E	
Hooglanderveen	Amersfoort	52°11′20″N 5°25′45″E	
Houtdijken	Woerden	52°06′25″N 4°55′35″E	
Houten	Houten	52°01′40″N 5°10′05″E	
Huis ter Heide	Zeist	52°06′45″N 5°15′20″E	
IJsselstein	IJsselstein	52°01′10″N 5°02′35″E	
Jaarsveld	Lopik	51°58′10″N 4°58′35″E	
Jannendorp	Leusden	52°08′35″N 5°29′45″E	
Kamerik	Woerden	52°06′40″N 4°53′40″E	
Kamerik-Mijzijde	Woerden	52°07′30″N 4°53′00″E	
Kanis	Woerden	52°07′30″N 4°53′30″E	
Kedichem	Vijfheerenlanden	51°51′35″N 5°03′00″E	
Kerklaan	Stichtse Vecht	52°13′15″N 5°00′30″E	
Knollemanshoek	IJsselstein	52°03′00″N 4°59′35″E	
Kockengen	Stichtse Vecht	52°08′55″N 4°57′00″E	
Kortenhoeven	Vijfheerenlanden	51°58′25″N 5°02′55″E	
Kortgerecht	Vijfheerenlanden	51°55′40″N 5°07′25″E	
Kortrijk	Stichtse Vecht	52°09′25″N 4°59′05″E	
Kromme Mijdrecht	De Ronde Venen	52°13′30″N 4°49′05″E	
Kromwijk	Woerden	52°04′25″N 4°52′55″E	
Laagnieuwkoop	Stichtse Vecht	52°07′50″N 4°58′35″E	
Laareind	Rhenen	51°57′40″N 5°36′20″E	
Lagebroek	De Ronde Venen	52°07′35″N 4°50′15″E	
Lage Vuursche	Baarn	52°10′45″N 5°13′25″E	
Lakerveld	Vijfheerenlanden	51°56′35″N 5°01′10″E	
Langbroek	Wijk bij Duurstede	52°00′45″N 5°19′40″E	
Lange Linschoten	Oudewater	52°02′30″N 4°53′20″E	
Leerbroek	Vijfheerenlanden	51°54′30″N 5°03′05″E	
Leerdam	Vijfheerenlanden	51°53′35″N 5°05′30″E	
Leersum	Utrechtse Heuvelrug	52°00′40″N 5°25′40″E	
Leusden	Leusden	52°08′00″N 5°25′55″E	
Leusden-Zuid	Leusden	52°07′05″N 5°24′20″E	
Lexmond	Vijfheerenlanden	51°57′45″N 5°02′05″E	
Linschoten	Montfoort	52°03′45″N 4°54′55″E	
Loenen aan de Vecht	Stichtse Vecht	52°12′35″N 5°01′20″E	
Loenersloot	Stichtse Vecht	52°13′45″N 5°00′05″E	
Loosdorp	Vijfheerenlanden	51°54′10″N 5°05′20″E	
Lopik	Lopik	51°58′20″N 4°56′55″E	
Lopikerkapel	Lopik	51°59′30″N 5°02′45″E	
Maarn	Utrechtse Heuvelrug	52°03′50″N 5°22′15″E	
Maarsbergen	Utrechtse Heuvelrug	52°03′30″N 5°24′20″E	
Maarssen	Stichtse Vecht	52°08′20″N 5°02′30″E	
Maartensdijk	De Bilt	52°09′20″N 5°10′30″E	
Mastwijk	Montfoort	52°03′15″N 4°57′20″E	
Meerkerk	Vijfheerenlanden	51°55′10″N 4°59′40″E	
Middelkoop	Vijfheerenlanden	51°55′25″N 5°03′10″E	
Mijdrecht	De Ronde Venen	52°12′25″N 4°51′45″E	
Mijnden	Stichtse Vecht	52°11′45″N 5°00′40″E	
Molenbuurt	Houten	51°59′15″N 5°09′45″E	
Molenpolder	Stichtse Vecht	52°08′50″N 5°05′00″E	
Montfoort	Montfoort	52°02′45″N 4°57′10″E	
Musschendorp	Leusden	52°08′50″N 5°27′20″E	
Nessersluis	De Ronde Venen	52°14′55″N 4°51′55″E	
Nieuwegein	Nieuwegein	52°01′45″N 5°04′50″E	
Nieuwerhoek	Stichtse Vecht	52°12′15″N 5°01′05″E	
Nieuwersluis	Stichtse Vecht	52°12′00″N 5°01′00″E	(VUGA, 1997)
Nieuwer-Ter-Aa	Stichtse Vecht	52°11′25″N 4°58′50″E	
Nieuwe-Wetering	De Bilt	52°08′25″N 5°09′55″E	
Nieuwland	Vijfheerenlanden	51°54′05″N 5°00′50″E	
Nigtevecht	Stichtse Vecht	52°16′25″N 5°01′40″E	
Noordeinde	Stichtse Vecht	52°10′00″N 4°57′00″E	
Ockhuizen	Utrecht	52°07′40″N 4°59′50″E	
Odijk	Bunnik	52°03′10″N 5°14′10″E	
Oosterwijk	Vijfheerenlanden	51°52′40″N 5°04′45″E	
Oud-Aa	Stichtse Vecht	52°10′55″N 4°58′25″E	
Oudenrijn	Utrecht	52°04′55″N 5°04′10″E	
Oudewater	Oudewater	52°01′30″N 4°52′05″E	
Oud-Kamerik	Woerden	52°08′15″N 4°54′10″E	
Oud-Leusden	Leusden	52°07′50″N 5°22′20″E	
Oud-Maarsseveen	Stichtse Vecht	52°09′30″N 5°05′25″E	(VUGA, 1997)
Oud-Wulven	Houten	52°02′35″N 5°09′20″E	
Oud-Zuilen	Stichtse Vecht	52°07′40″N 5°04′05″E	
Oukoop	Stichtse Vecht	52°12′15″N 4°58′35″E	
Overberg	Utrechtse Heuvelrug	52°02′25″N 5°29′40″E	
Overboeicop	Vijfheerenlanden	51°56′10″N 5°06′40″E	
Overheicop	Vijfheerenlanden	51°55′30″N 5°06′10″E	
Overlangbroek	Wijk bij Duurstede	51°59′30″N 5°22′50″E	
Palestina	Amersfoort	52°12′30″N 5°25′40″E	
Palmstad	Utrechtse Heuvelrug	52°02′10″N 5°19′15″E	
Papekop	Oudewater	52°02′45″N 4°51′10″E	
Pijnenburg	Soest	52°10′15″N 5°14′45″E	
Polsbroek	Lopik	51°58′40″N 4°51′10″E	
Polsbroekerdam	Lopik	51°59′40″N 4°54′10″E	
Portengen	Stichtse Vecht	52°09′15″N 4°57′55″E	
Portengense Brug	Stichtse Vecht	52°09′40″N 4°57′30″E	
Reijerscop	Woerden	52°04′35″N 4°58′35″E	
Remmerden	Rhenen	51°58′25″N 5°32′00″E	
Renswoude	Renswoude	52°04′25″N 5°32′25″E	
Rhenen	Rhenen	51°57′35″N 5°34′05″E	
Rietveld	Woerden	52°05′20″N 4°50′45″E	
Rijsenburg	Utrechtse Heuvelrug	52°03′00″N 5°16′00″E	Now part of Driebergen-Rijsenburg.
Ruigeweide	Oudewater	52°01′45″N 4°49′45″E	
Sandenburg	Wijk bij Duurstede	52°00′25″N 5°20′40″E	
Schalkwijk	Houten	51°59′40″N 5°11′15″E	
Scheendijk	Stichtse Vecht	52°10′45″N 5°01′20″E	
Schoonrewoerd	Vijfheerenlanden	51°55′15″N 5°07′00″E	
Sluis	Vijfheerenlanden	51°57′20″N 4°58′40″E	
Snelrewaard	Oudewater	52°01′40″N 4°54′30″E	
Snorrenhoef	Leusden	52°07′40″N 5°28′05″E	
Soest	Soest	52°10′25″N 5°17′30″E	
Soestdijk	Soest	52°11′30″N 5°17′05″E	
Soestduinen	Soest	52°08′45″N 5°18′00″E	
Soesterberg	Soest	52°07′05″N 5°17′10″E	
Spakenburg	Bunschoten	52°15′00″N 5°22′00″E	Now part of Bunschoten-Spakenburg.
Spengen	Stichtse Vecht	52°09′25″N 4°57′55″E	
Sterrenberg	Zeist	52°06′50″N 5°16′55″E	
Stokkelaarsbrug	De Ronde Venen	52°16′10″N 4°55′50″E	
Stoutenburg	Leusden	52°09′10″N 5°26′10″E	
Tappersheul	Oudewater	52°02′10″N 4°51′35″E	
Teckop	Woerden	52°08′00″N 4°55′15″E	
't Goy	Houten	52°00′10″N 5°13′25″E	
Themaat	Utrecht	52°07′00″N 5°00′35″E	
Tienhoven, Everdingen	Vijfheerenlanden	51°57′40″N 5°08′20″E	
Tienhoven, Stichtse Vecht	Stichtse Vecht	52°09′55″N 5°05′00″E	
Tienhoven aan de Lek	Vijfheerenlanden	51°57′35″N 4°56′25″E	
Tull en 't Waal	Houten	52°00′05″N 5°07′55″E	
't Zand	Utrecht	52°05′35″N 5°02′45″E	
Uitweg	Lopik	51°59′00″N 5°01′00″E	
Utrecht	Utrecht	52°05′30″N 5°07′20″E	
Valkenheide	Utrechtse Heuvelrug	52°02′25″N 5°25′00″E	
Vechten	Bunnik	52°03′50″N 5°10′20″E	
Veenendaal	Veenendaal	52°01′25″N 5°33′00″E	
Veldhuizen	Utrecht	52°03′55″N 5°00′40″E	
Vianen	Vijfheerenlanden	51°59′30″N 5°05′30″E	
Vinkekade	De Ronde Venen	52°14′30″N 4°58′15″E	
Vinkeveen	De Ronde Venen	52°12′50″N 4°55′40″E	
Vleuten	Utrecht	52°06′20″N 5°00′55″E	
Vliet	Oudewater	52°01′00″N 4°51′10″E	
Voskuilen	Woudenberg	52°06′15″N 5°26′35″E	
Vreeland	Stichtse Vecht	52°13′50″N 5°01′55″E	
Waverveen	De Ronde Venen	52°13′20″N 4°53′55″E	
Wayen	Houten	52°03′00″N 5°07′55″E	
Werkhoven	Bunnik	52°01′30″N 5°14′40″E	
Westbroek	De Bilt	52°09′00″N 5°07′30″E	
Weverwijk	Vijfheerenlanden	51°54′45″N 5°00′50″E	
Wijk bij Duurstede	Wijk bij Duurstede	51°58′30″N 5°20′30″E	
Willeskop	Montfoort	52°01′25″N 4°54′40″E	
Willige Langerak	Lopik	51°56′40″N 4°52′45″E	
Wilnis	De Ronde Venen	52°11′45″N 4°53′50″E	
Woerden	Woerden	52°05′05″N 4°53′00″E	
Woudenberg	Woudenberg	52°04′50″N 5°25′00″E	
Zegveld	Woerden	52°06′55″N 4°50′10″E	
Zeist	Zeist	52°05′25″N 5°14′00″E	
Zeldert	Amersfoort	52°12′00″N 5°21′45″E	
Zevender	Lopik	51°57′25″N 4°52′35″E	
Zevenhuizen	Bunschoten	52°12′40″N 5°23′20″E	
Zijderveld	Vijfheerenlanden	51°56′30″N 5°08′25″E	
Zuideinde	Stichtse Vecht	52°08′50″N 4°58′20″E	

== See also ==
- List of municipalities in Utrecht
