= Nieuwe Wetering (disambiguation) =

Nieuwe Wetering may refer to several places in the Netherlands:

- Nieuwe Wetering, in South Holland
- Nieuwe-Wetering, in Utrecht
- Nieuwe Wetering (Overijssel), see Zwarte Water
