= Van de Wetering =

Van de Wetering is a Dutch toponymic surname, meaning "from/of the (drainage) channel". Among spelling variants are Watering, Weetering and Weteringh. Many waters in the Netherlands have the name as well a number of towns, themselves named after a wetering, e.g. Wetering, Nieuwe-Wetering, Nieuwe-Wetering, and Oude Wetering. Forms without the article (Van Wetering etc.) likely refer to such a settlement. People with these names include:

Van de Wetering

- Ernst van de Wetering (1938–2021), Dutch Rembrandt expert
- Henricus van de Wetering (1850–1929), Dutch archbishop
- Janwillem van de Wetering (1931–2008), Dutch–American author of detective novels
- Marlon van de Wetering (born 2007), Jamaican footballer
- Peter Van de Wetering (1931–2014), Dutch–American horticulturist

Van Wetering

- Bo van Wetering (born 1999), Dutch handball player
- Ineke van Wetering (1934–2011), Dutch anthropologist and Surinamist

Van de Weetering

- Conrad van de Weetering (1929–2017), Dutch ballet dancer and choreographer
- Myrthe van de Weetering (born 1988), Dutch violinist and composer
