= Middelkoop (surname) =

Middelkoop (Dutch pronunciation: [ˈmɪdəlkoːp]) or van Middelkoop is a Dutch surname derived from the name of Middelkoop, hamlet in the Netherlands. Notable people with the surname include:

- Eimert van Middelkoop (born 1949), Dutch politician
- Matwé Middelkoop (born 1983), Dutch tennis player
