= Haspel =

Haspel is a surname. Notable people with the surname include:

- David Haspel Shepard (1940–2017), American film preservationist
- Gina Haspel (born 1956), American intelligence officer
- Joseph Haspel (c. 1883 - 1959), inventor of the seersucker suit
- Judith Haspel (1918–2004), Austrian-born Israeli swimmer
- Rachel Oestreicher Haspel, now known as Rachel Oestreicher Bernheim (born 1943), American human rights advocate
- Tamar Haspel, American food columnist
- Wilhelm Haspel (1898-1952), German business executive

== See also ==
- Haspel Corporation, fictional company
