= Kortenhoeven =

- Hamlet
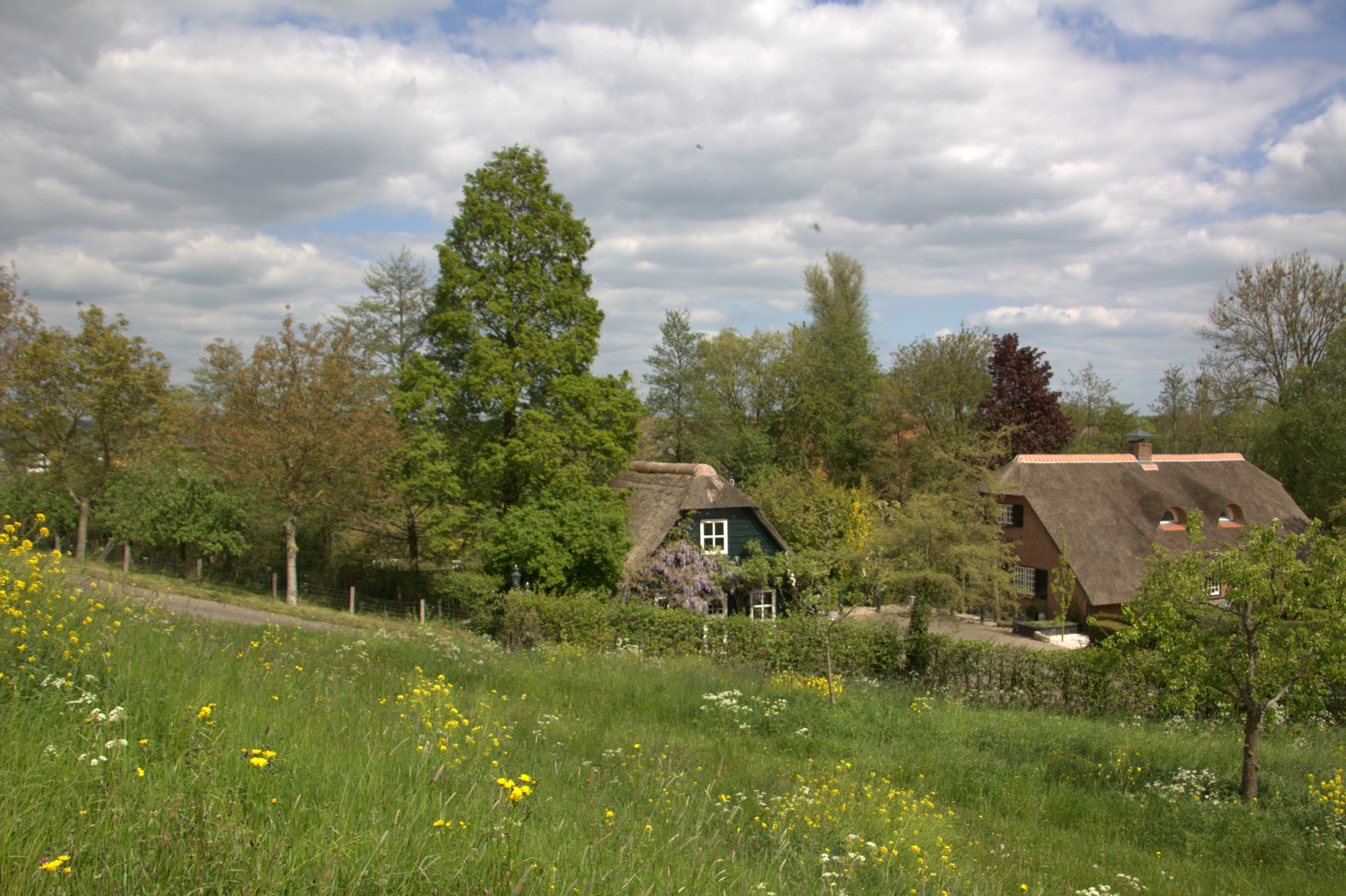
- View on Kortenhoeven

- Location in the Netherlands Kortenhoeven (Netherlands)
- Coordinates: 51°58′14″N 5°02′51″E
- Country: Netherlands
- Province: Utrecht
- Municipality: Vijfheerenlanden
- Time zone: UTC+1 (CET)
  - Summer (DST): UTC+2 (CEST)
- Postal code: 4128
- Dialing code: 0347

Kortenhoeven is a hamlet in the Dutch province of Utrecht. It is a part of the municipality of Vijfheerenlanden, and lies about 5 km south of IJsselstein.

The hamlet was first mentioned around 1343 as Cortenhover, and means short river bank. It is not a statistical entity, and the postal authorities have placed it under Lexmond. Kortenhoeven has no place name signs. In 1840, it was home to 120 people. Nowadays, it consists about 120 houses.
