= Gerverscop =

- Hamlet
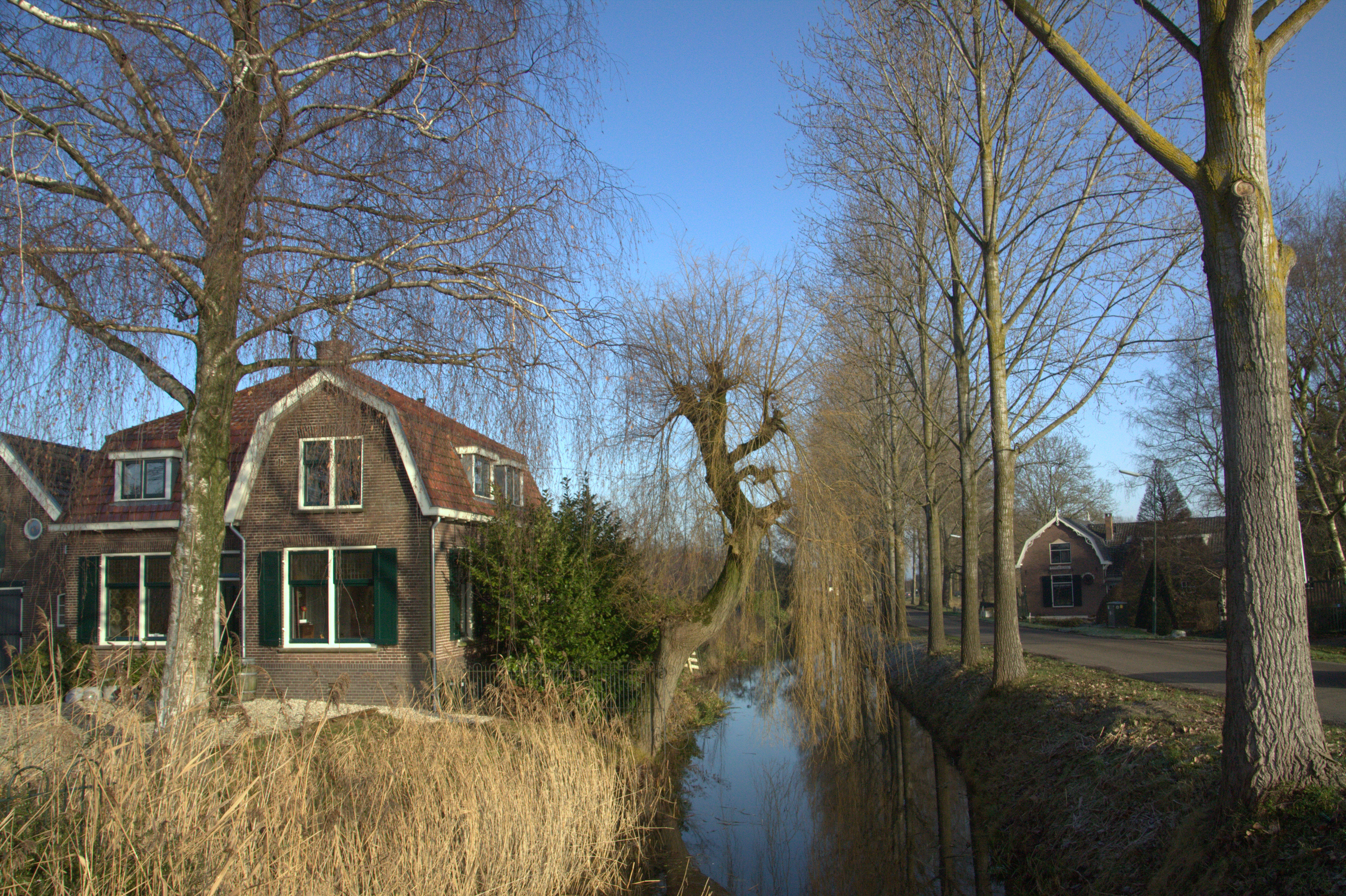

- Location in the Netherlands Gerverscop (Netherlands)
- Coordinates: 52°06′58″N 4°56′58″E
- Country: Netherlands
- Province: Utrecht
- Municipality: Woerden

Area
  - Total: 7.36 km^{2} (2.84 sq mi)

Population (2007)
  - Total: 255
  - Density: 34.6/km^{2} (89.7/sq mi)
- Time zone: UTC+1 (CET)
  - Summer (DST): UTC+2 (CEST)
- Postal code: 3481
- Dialing code: 0348

Gerverscop is a hamlet in the Dutch province of Utrecht. It is a part of the municipality of Woerden, and lies about 5 km northeast of Woerden. Until 1857, it was a separate municipality; it then was joined to the municipality of Harmelen.

The former municipality consisted of the polders Gerverscop and Breudijk, north of Harmelen. In the 19th century, it had about 160 inhabitants, 120 of which in the polder Gerverscop.

The hamlet was first mentioned between 1280 and 1287 as Gherverscoep, and means "concession of Gerver (person)". Gerverscop has no place name signs.

== Gallery ==
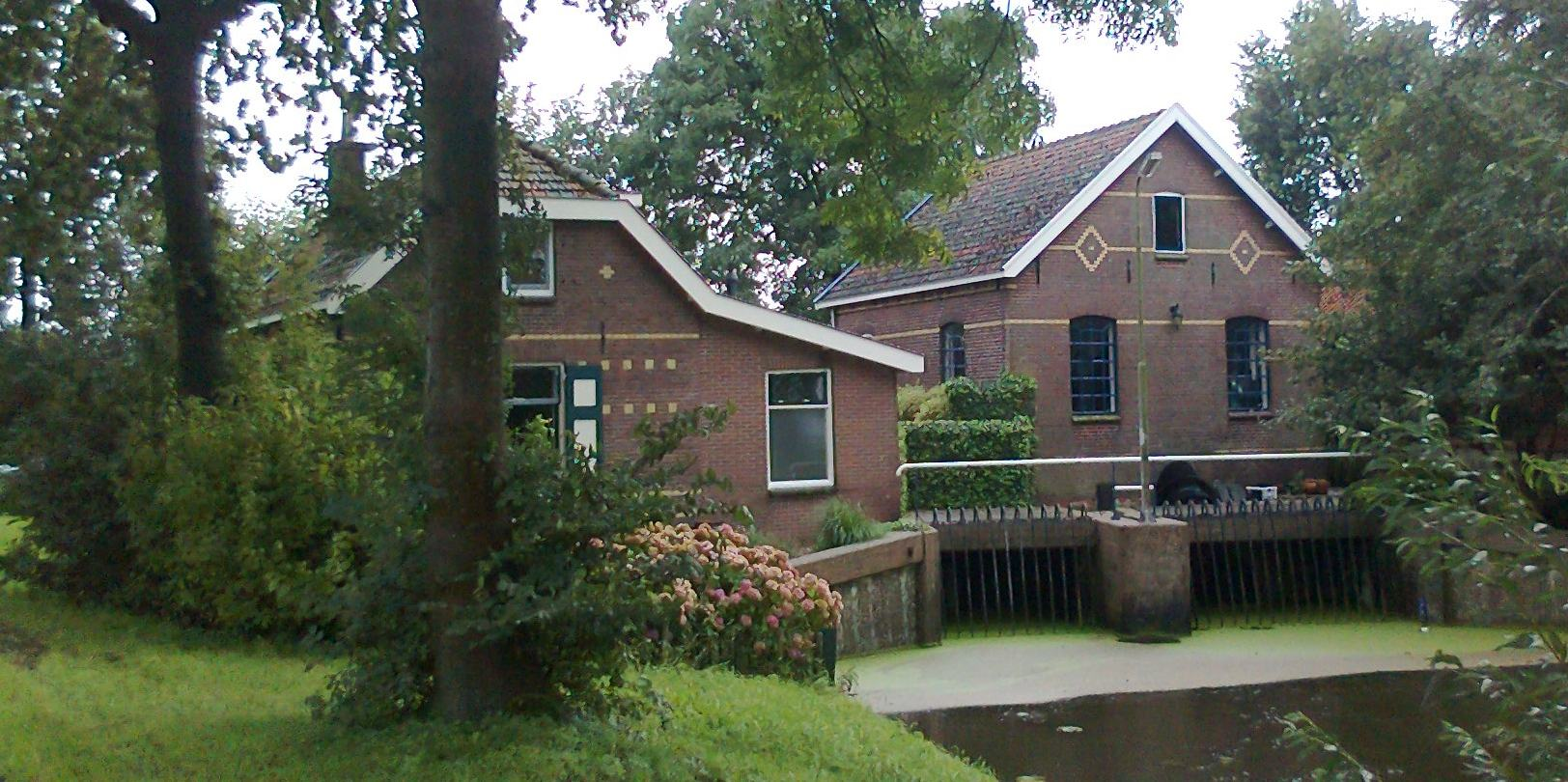
Pumping station Gerverscop

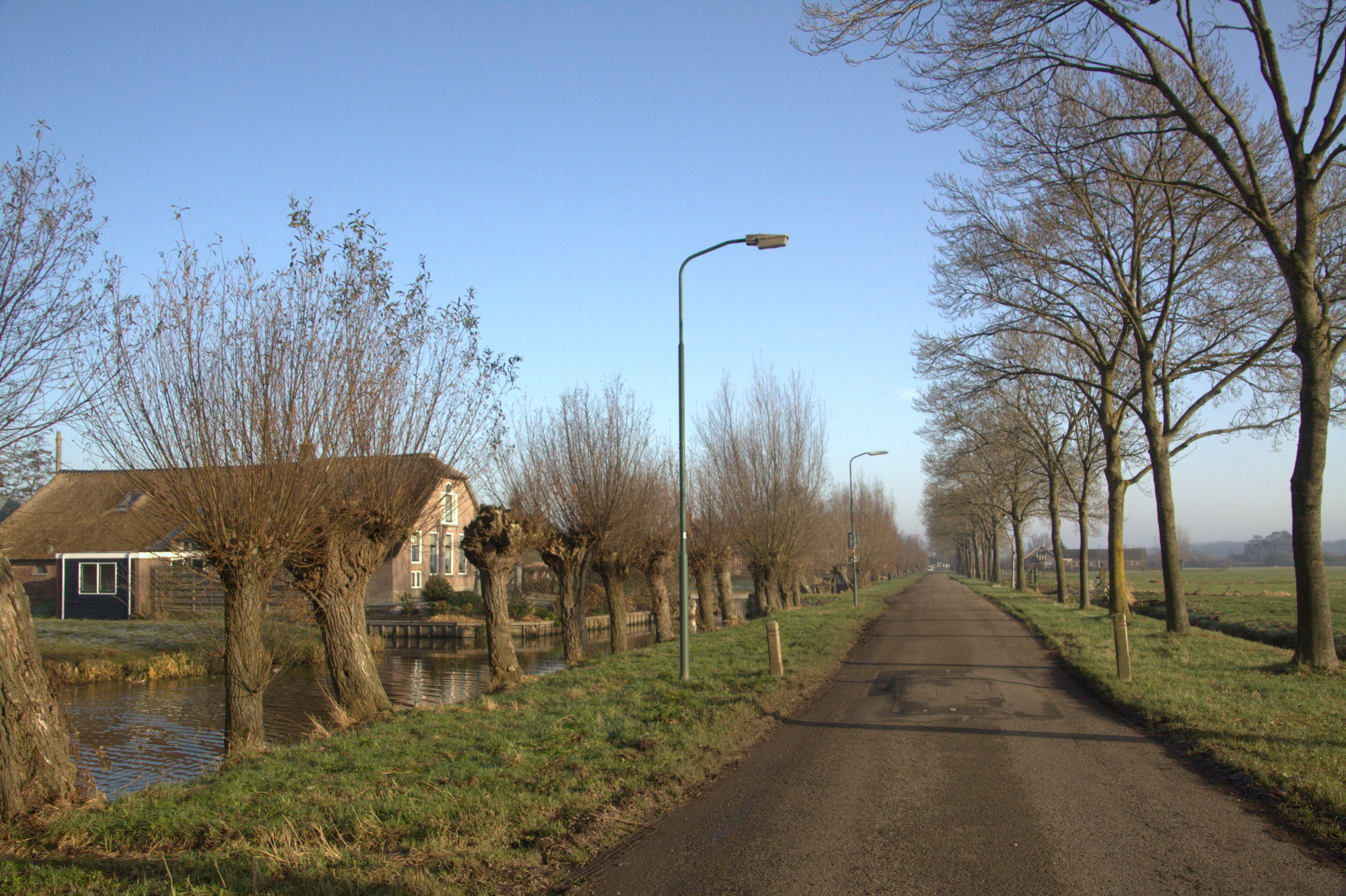
Gerverscop
