= Achterwetering =

- Hamlet
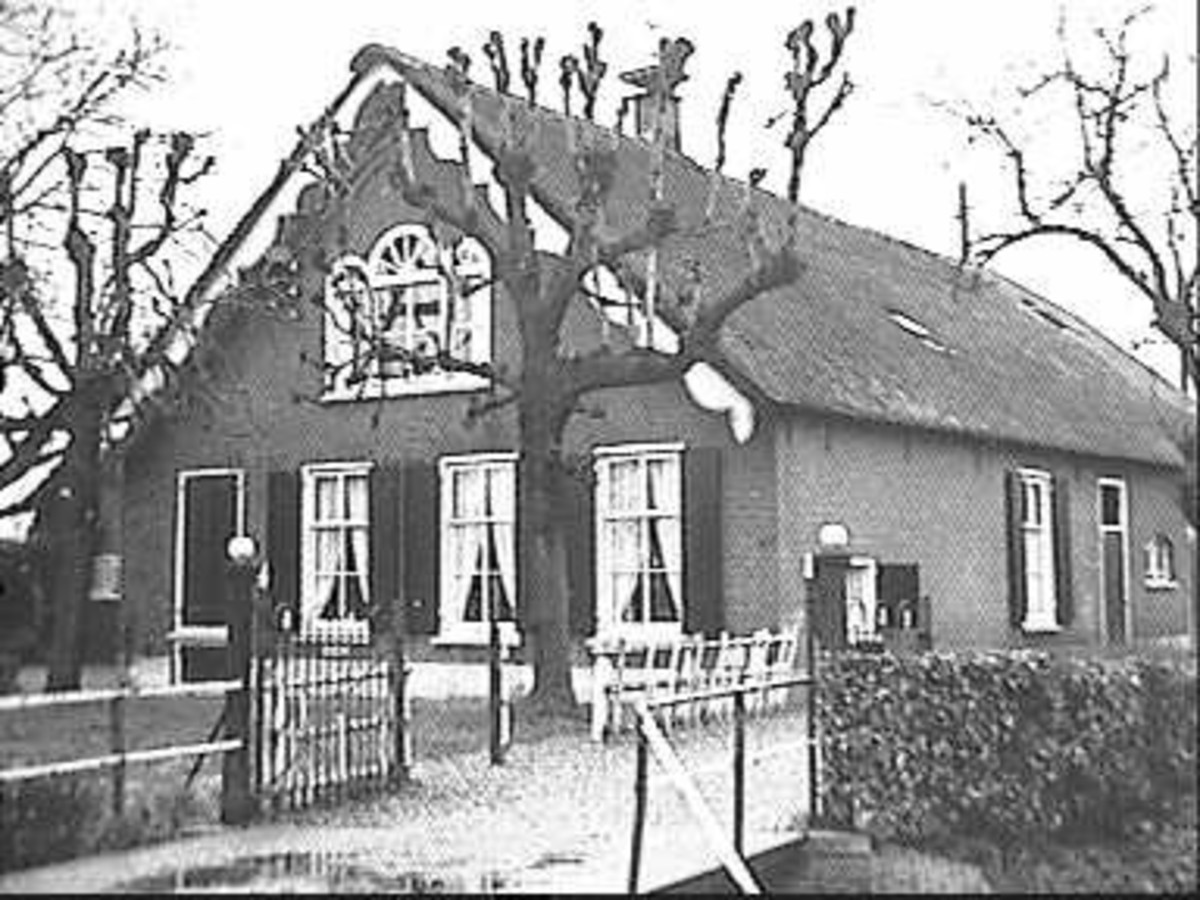
- Farm in Achterwetering

- Location in the Netherlands Achterwetering (Netherlands)
- Coordinates: 52°9′1″N 5°9′7″E
- Country: Netherlands
- Province: Utrecht
- Municipality: De Bilt
- Time zone: UTC+1 (CET)
  - Summer (DST): UTC+2 (CEST)
- Postal code: 3738
- Dialing code: 0346

Achterwetering is a hamlet in the Dutch province of Utrecht. It is a part of the municipality of De Bilt, and lies about 4 km northwest of Bilthoven.

It was first mentioned in 1696 as De Achter Weteringe, and means behind the polder canal. Achterwetering is not a statistical entity, and the postal authorities have placed it under Maartensdijk. It does not have place name signs. In 1840, it was home to 121 people. Nowadays, it consists of about 30 houses.
