= Vliet, Utrecht =

Hamlet in the Netherlands

Coordinates: 52°01′N 4°51′E

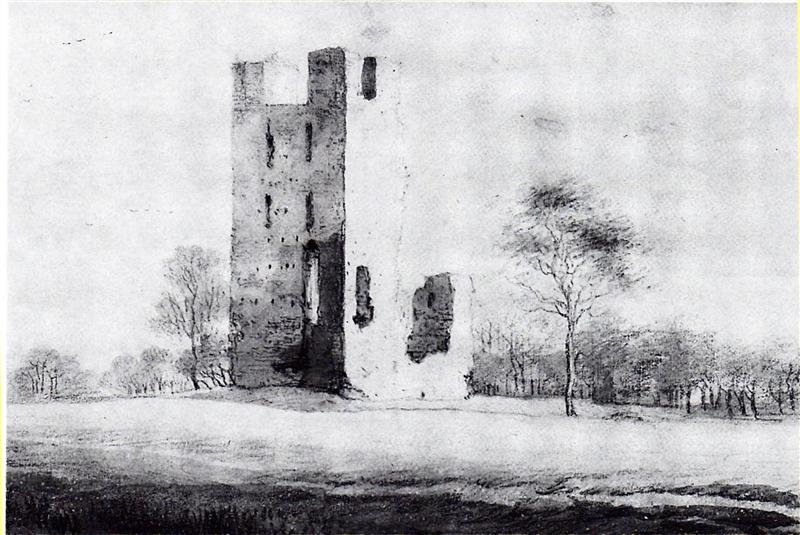
Ruins of Castle te Vliet in 1646 or 1647.

Vliet is a hamlet in the Dutch province of Utrecht. It is located about 1 km southwest of the city of Oudewater, on the south bank of the Hollandsche IJssel.

Vliet or Ratelsvliet was a separate municipality between 1817 and 1846, when it became part of Haastrecht. During that time, the area was part of the province of South Holland.

According to the 19th-century historian A.J. van der Aa, there was no hamlet in the area in the middle of the 19th century. There were just eight houses, with a population of about 50. The area used to be a manor, also called Vliet or "Ratelesvliet", and contained a castle, Te Vliet. The castle was probably built between 1250 and 1300, and existed at least until 1515. In 1647, it was already a ruin, and nowadays just one wall still exists.
