= Wilhelm Haspel =

German business executive (1898–1952)

- Born: 1898
- Died: 6 January 1952; Stuttgart, Germany
- Education: University of Stuttgart
- Occupation: Business executive
- Known for: chairman and CEO of Daimler AG (1942-1952)

Wilhelm Haspel (1898 - 6 January 1952) was a German business executive. He served as the chairman and chief executive officer of Daimler AG from 1942 to 1952.

== Early life ==
Wilhem Haspel was born in 1898. He graduated from the University of Stuttgart.

== Career ==
Haspel joined Daimler in 1924. He became the manager of the factory in Sindelfingen in 1927. He served as the chairman and chief executive officer from 1942 to 1952.

== Personal life and death ==
Haspel was married to a Jewish woman. He died of brain hemorrhage on 6 January 1952 in Stuttgart, Germany.
