= Reijerscop =

- Hamlet
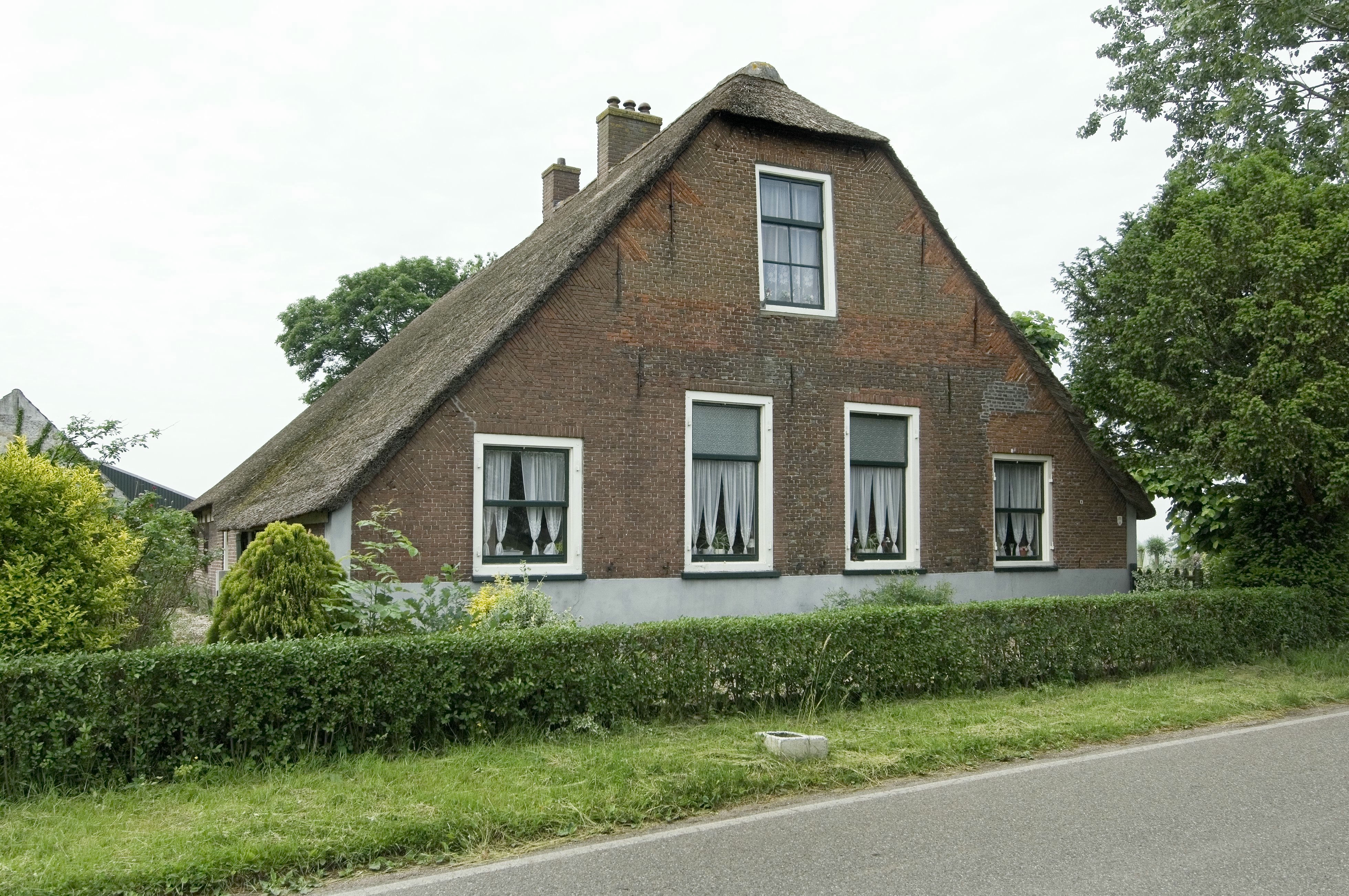
- Farm in Reijerscop

- Location in the Netherlands Reijerscop (Netherlands)
- Coordinates: 52°04′36″N 4°58′40″E
- Country: Netherlands
- Province: Utrecht
- Municipality: Woerden

Area
  - Total: 5.18 km^{2} (2.00 sq mi)

Population (2021)
  - Total: 145
  - Density: 28.0/km^{2} (72.5/sq mi)
- Time zone: UTC+1 (CET)
  - Summer (DST): UTC+2 (CEST)
- Postal code: 3481
- Dialing code: 0348

Reijerscop is a hamlet in the Dutch province of Utrecht. It is a part of the municipality of Woerden, and lies about 12 km west of Utrecht.

The hamlet was first mentioned in 1217 as Reynerscoep, and means "concession of Reyner (person)". Reijerscop has unofficial place name signs. In 1840, it was home to 31 people.
