= Groenlandsekade =

- Hamlet
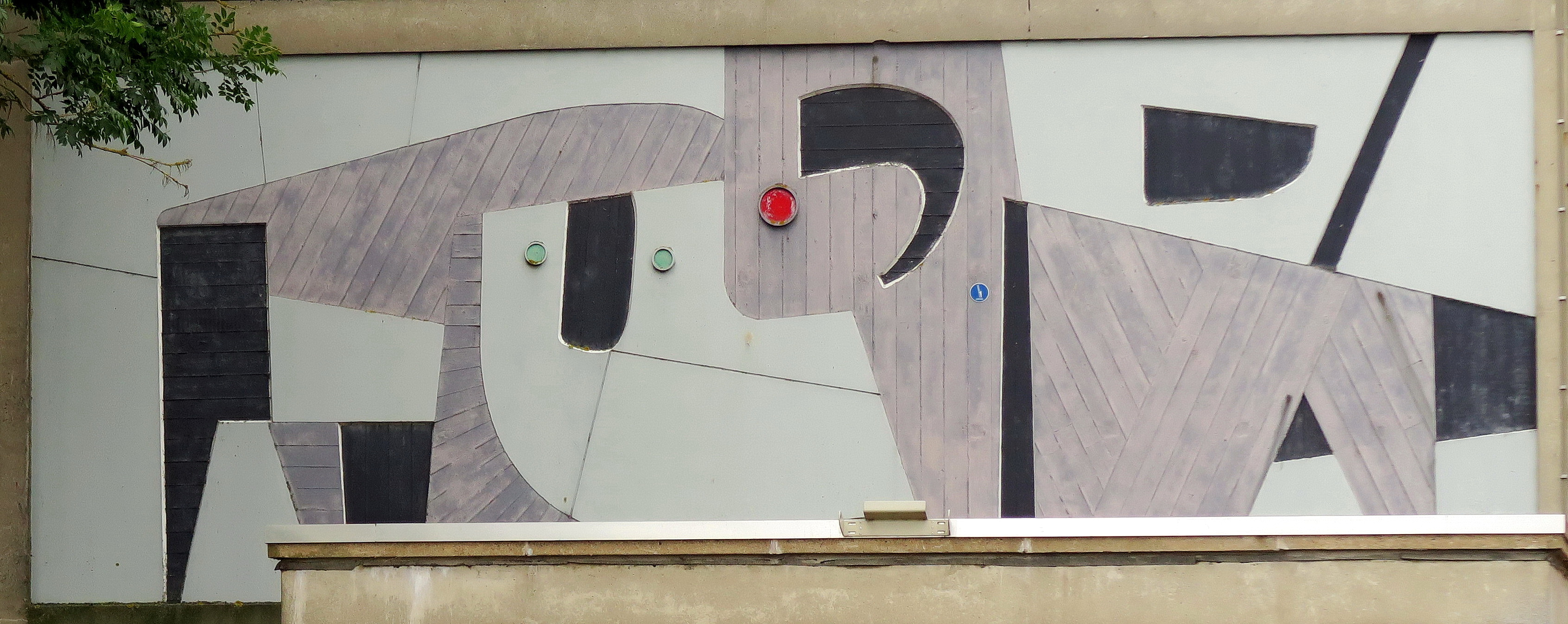
- Art in Groenlandsekade

- Location in the Netherlands Groenlandsekade (Netherlands)
- Coordinates: 52°13′50″N 4°58′37″E
- Country: Netherlands
- Province: Utrecht
- Municipality: De Ronde Venen
- Time zone: UTC+1 (CET)
  - Summer (DST): UTC+2 (CEST)
- Postal code: 3645
- Dialing code: 0297

Groenlandsekade is a hamlet in the Dutch province of Utrecht. It is located in the municipality of De Ronde Venen, about 4 km northeast of Vinkeveen. Groenlandsekade consists of a single road, parallel to the A2 highway Amsterdam-Utrecht. The road is situated on an embankment ("kade" in Dutch), which forms the northeast shore of the lake area Vinkeveensche Plassen.

Until his death in 2004, the popular Dutch singer André Hazes lived here.

It was first mentioned between 1839 and 1859 as "De Vinkenkade of Groenland". The etymology is unclear. Groenlandsekade is not a statistical entity, and the postal authorities have placed it under Vinkeveen. There are no place name signs. Groenlandsekade consists of about 75 houses.
