= Beerschoten =

- Hamlet
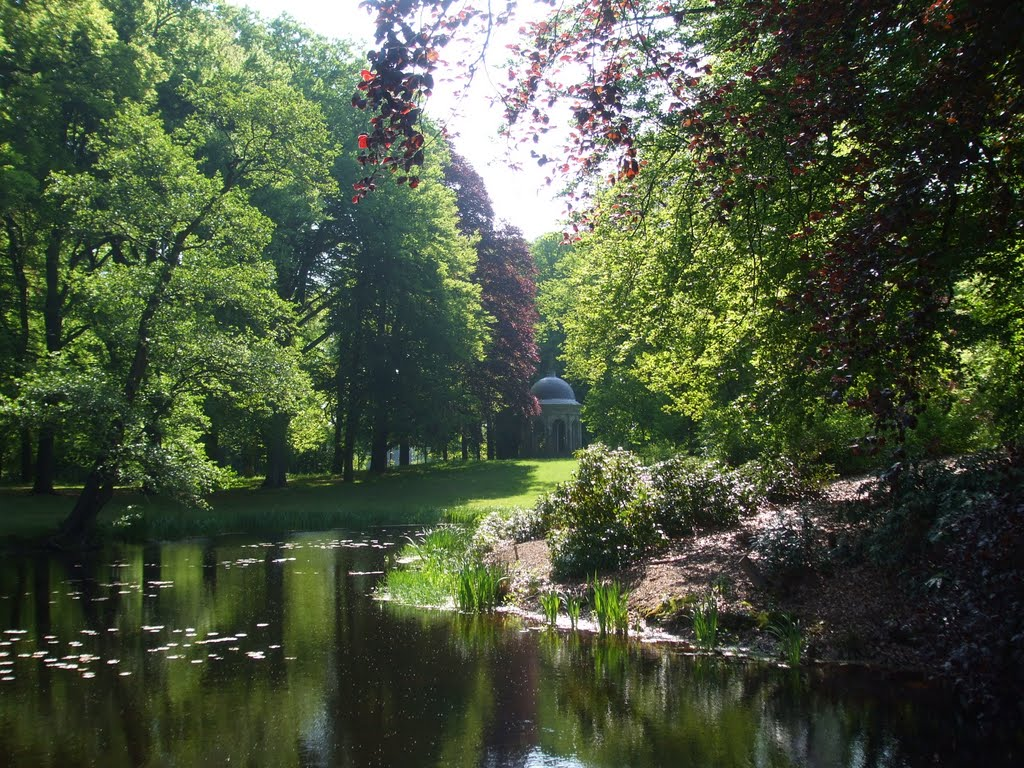
- Park Beerschoten-Willinkshof

- Location in the Netherlands Beerschoten (Netherlands)
- Coordinates: 52°4′1″N 5°16′1″E
- Country: Netherlands
- Province: Utrecht
- Municipality: Utrechtse Heuvelrug
- Time zone: UTC+1 (CET)
  - Summer (DST): UTC+2 (CEST)
- Postal code: 3709
- Dialing code: 030

Beerschoten is a hamlet in the municipality Utrechtse Heuvelrug, in the Dutch province Utrecht.

Beerschoten lies on the edge of a forest between the towns of Zeist (to the northwest) and Driebergen-Rijsenburg (to the southeast). Just north of the hamlet is the railway station Driebergen-Zeist. The hamlet grew around the estate "Beerschoten-Willinkshof". It was first mentioned in 1874 Beerschoten and was named after a manor house with was demolished in 1850. It is not a statistical entity, and the postal authorities have placed it under Zeist.
