= Themaat =

- Hamlet
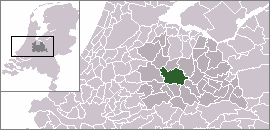

- Themaat in the municipality of Utrecht.
- Coordinates: 52°06′57″N 5°00′36″E
- Country: Netherlands
- Province: Utrecht
- Municipality: Utrecht
- Time zone: UTC+1 (CET)
  - Summer (DST): UTC+2 (CEST)

Themaat is a hamlet in the Dutch province of Utrecht. It is a part of the municipality of Utrecht, and lies about 7 km west of Utrecht.

The hamlet has about 100 inhabitants.
