= Baambrugse Zuwe =

- Hamlet
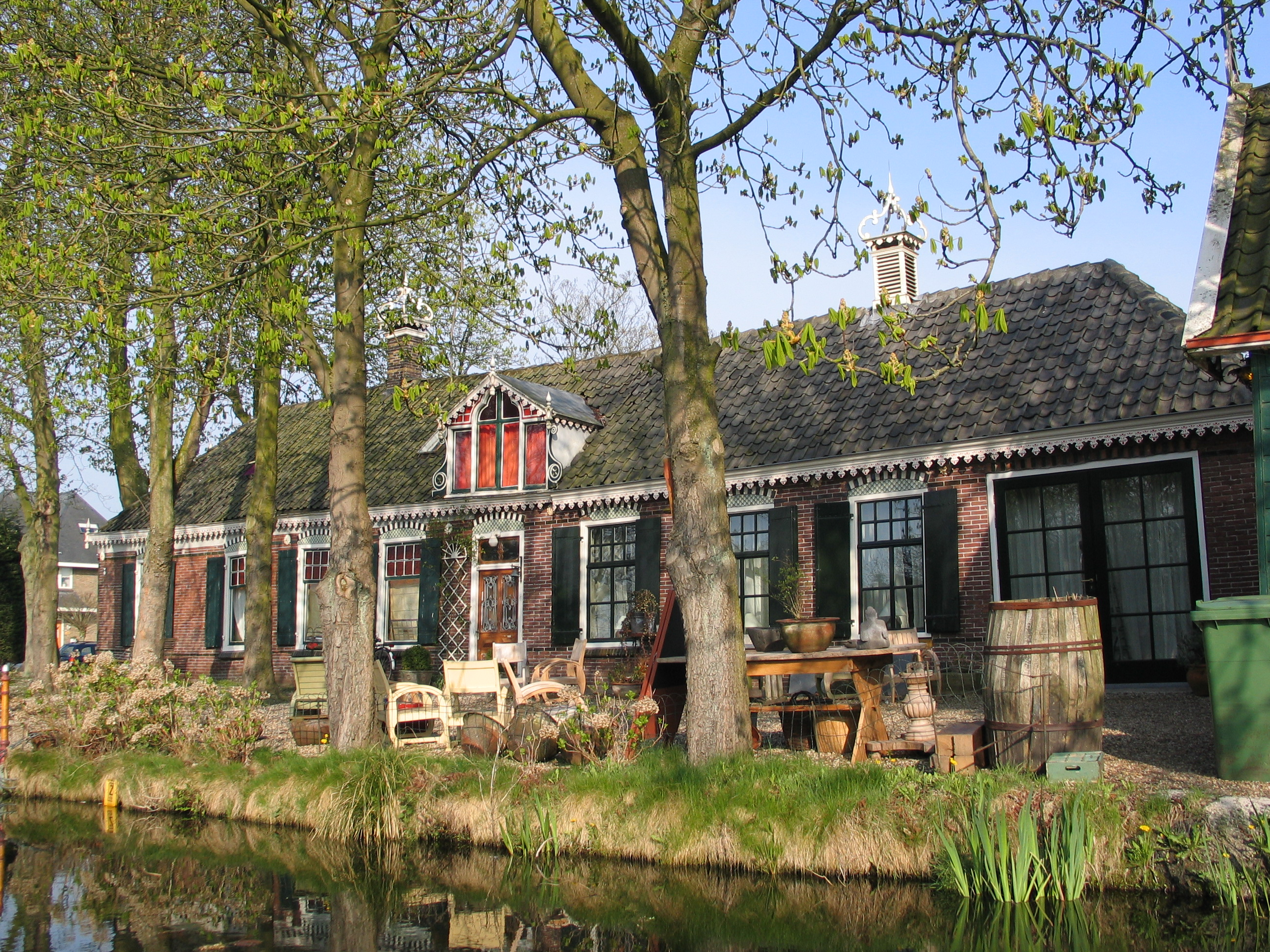

- Location in the Netherlands Baambrugse Zuwe (Netherlands)
- Coordinates: 52°13′45″N 4°57′5″E
- Country: Netherlands
- Province: Utrecht
- Municipality: De Ronde Venen
- Time zone: UTC+1 (CET)
  - Summer (DST): UTC+2 (CEST)
- Postal code: 3645
- Dialing code: 0297

Baambrugse Zuwe is a hamlet in the Dutch province of Utrecht. It is located in the municipality of De Ronde Venen, northeast of Vinkeveen. The hamlet consists of one road, close to 4 km long, going straight through the lake area the Vinkeveense Plassen.

It was first mentioned in 1851 as Vinkeveensche-Zuwe (De), and means side-wards dike belonging to Baambrugge (originally Vinkeveen). Baambrugse Zuwe is not a statistical entity, and the postal authorities have placed it under Vinkeveen. There are no place name signs, and it consists of about 240 houses.
