= Harmelerwaard =

- Hamlet
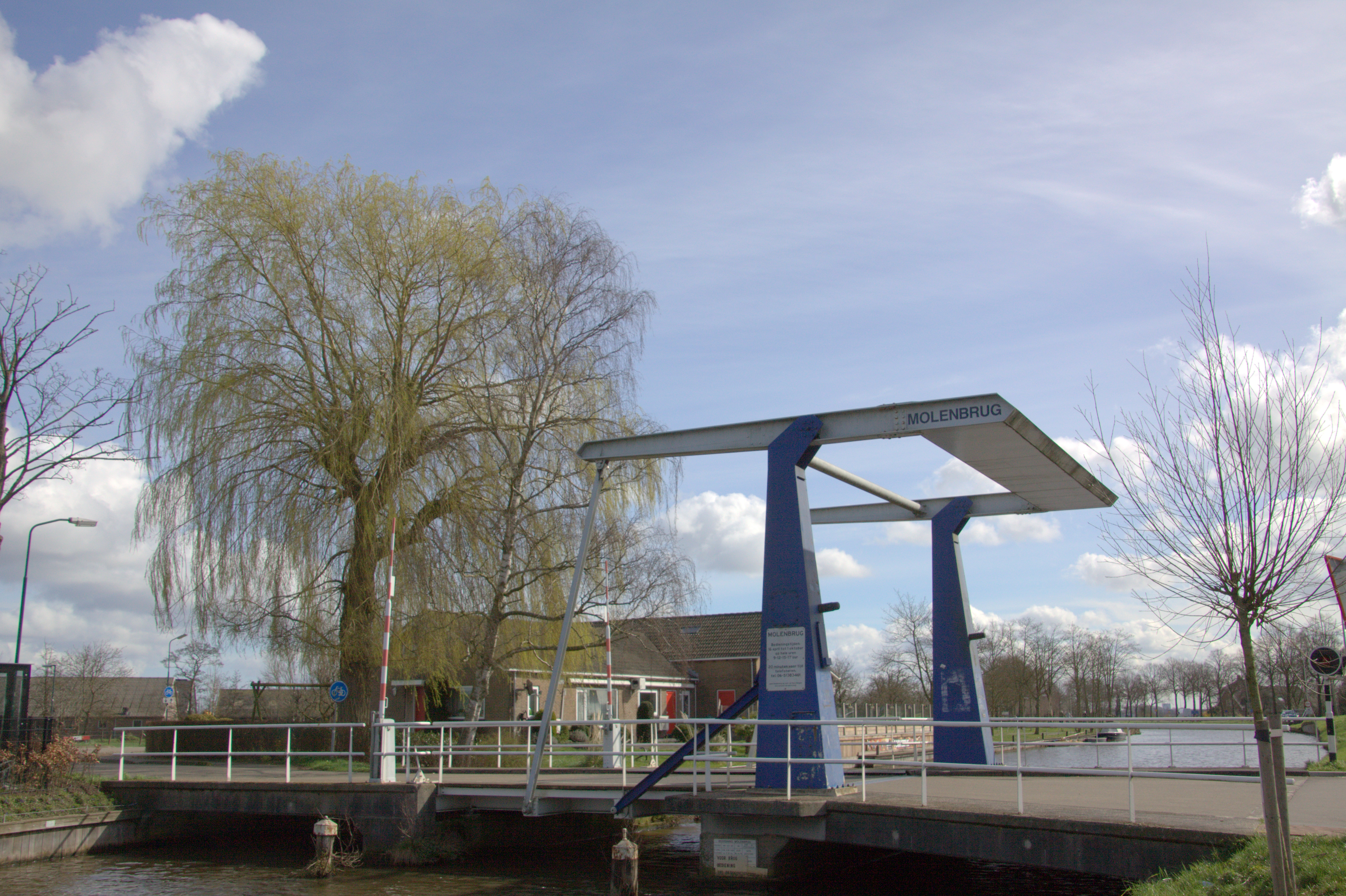
- Draw bridge in Harmerlerwaard

- Location in the Netherlands Harmelerwaard (Netherlands)
- Coordinates: 52°05′19″N 4°58′55″E
- Country: Netherlands
- Province: Utrecht
- Municipality: Woerden
- Time zone: UTC+1 (CET)
  - Summer (DST): UTC+2 (CEST)
- Postal code: 3481
- Dialing code: 0348

Harmelerwaard is a hamlet in the Dutch province of Utrecht. It is a part of the municipality of Woerden, and lies about 9 km west of Utrecht.

The hamlet was first mentioned between 1280 and 1287 as Hermaelrewart, and means "land near water belonging to Harmelen". It is not a statistical entity, and the postal authorities have placed it under Harmelen. It has no place name signs. In 1840, Harmelerwaard was home to 40 people. Nowadays, it consists of about 80 houses.

== Gallery ==
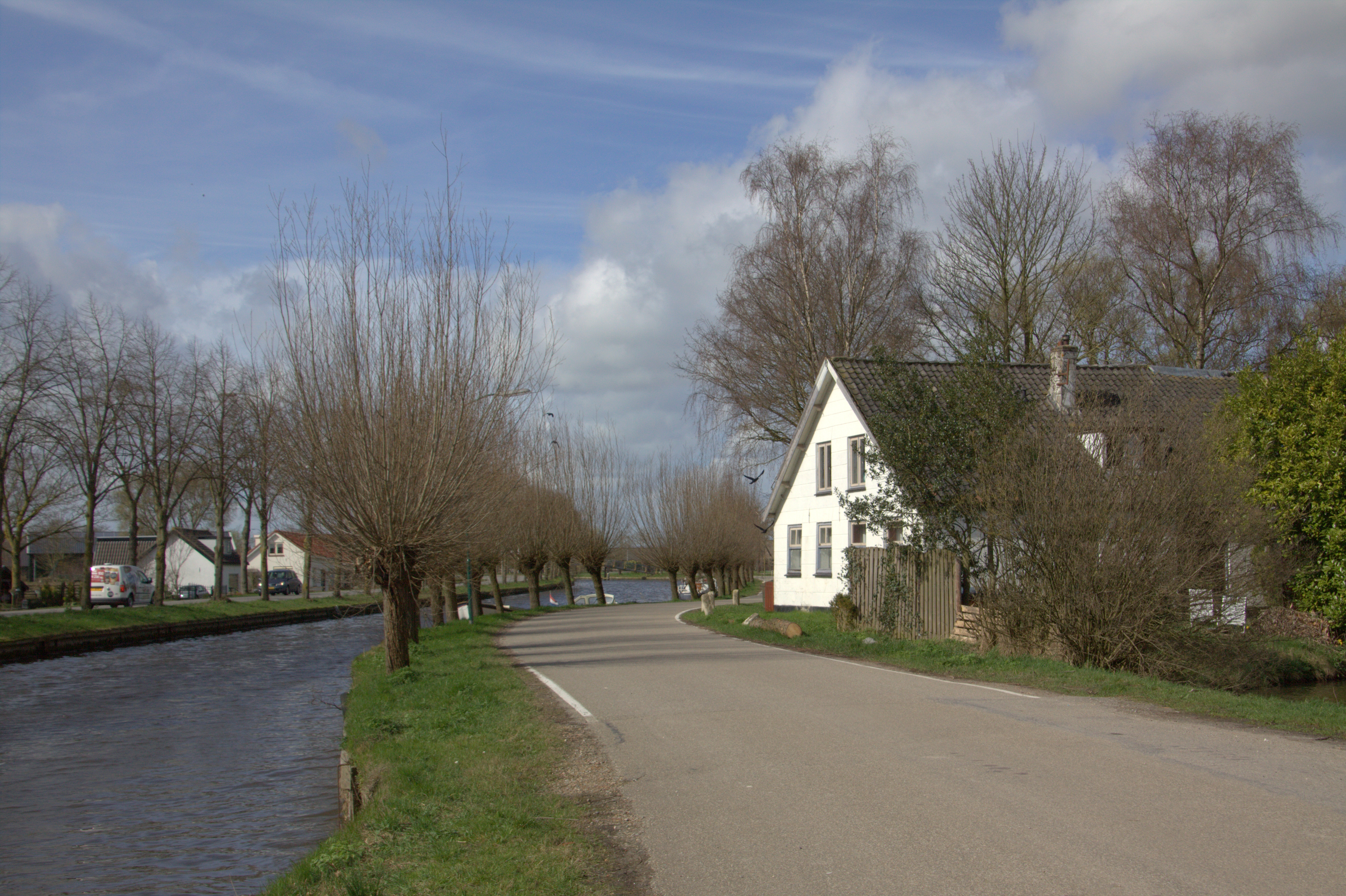
Street view

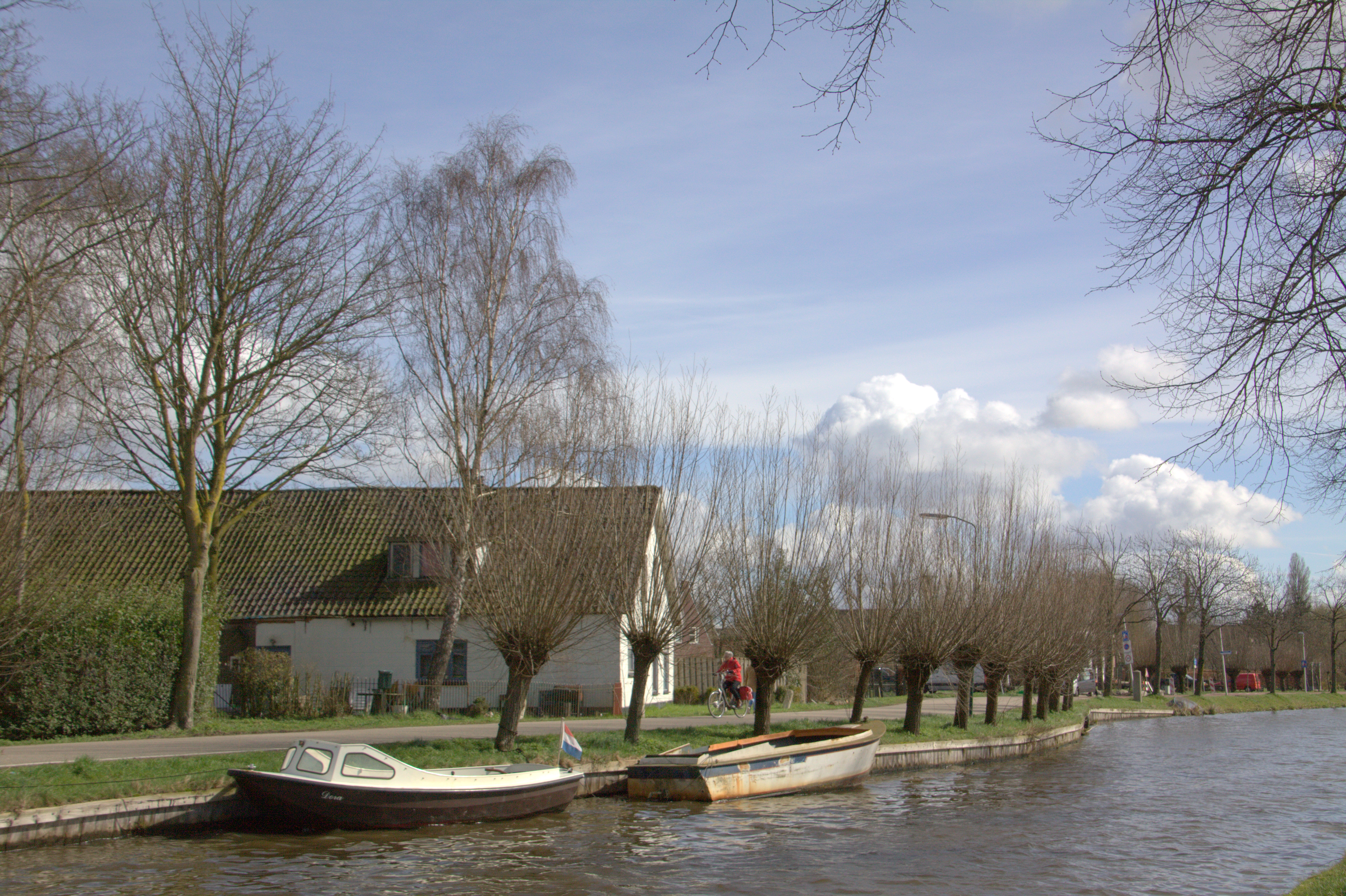
Street view
