= Ockhuizen =

- Hamlet
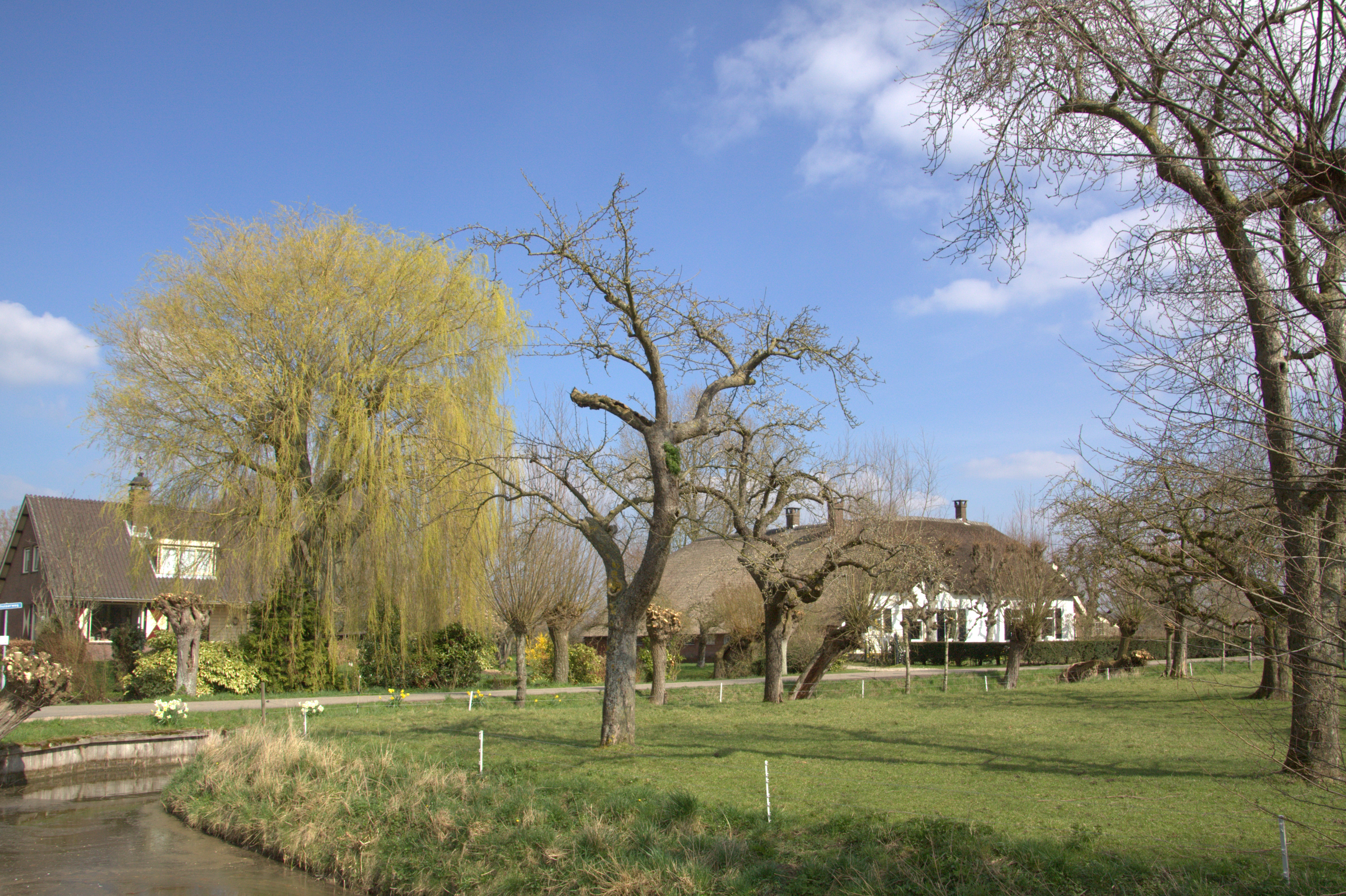

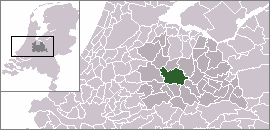

- Ockhuizen in the municipality of Utrecht.
- Coordinates: 52°07′43″N 4°59′50″E
- Country: Netherlands
- Province: Utrecht
- Municipality: Utrecht
- Time zone: UTC+1 (CET)
  - Summer (DST): UTC+2 (CEST)

Ockhuizen is a hamlet near the village of Haarzuilens in the Dutch province of Utrecht. It is a part of the municipality of Utrecht, and lies about 11 km northwest from the city centre of Utrecht.

The hamlet has about 10 farmhouses and other dwellings.
