= Hooglanderveen =

- Village
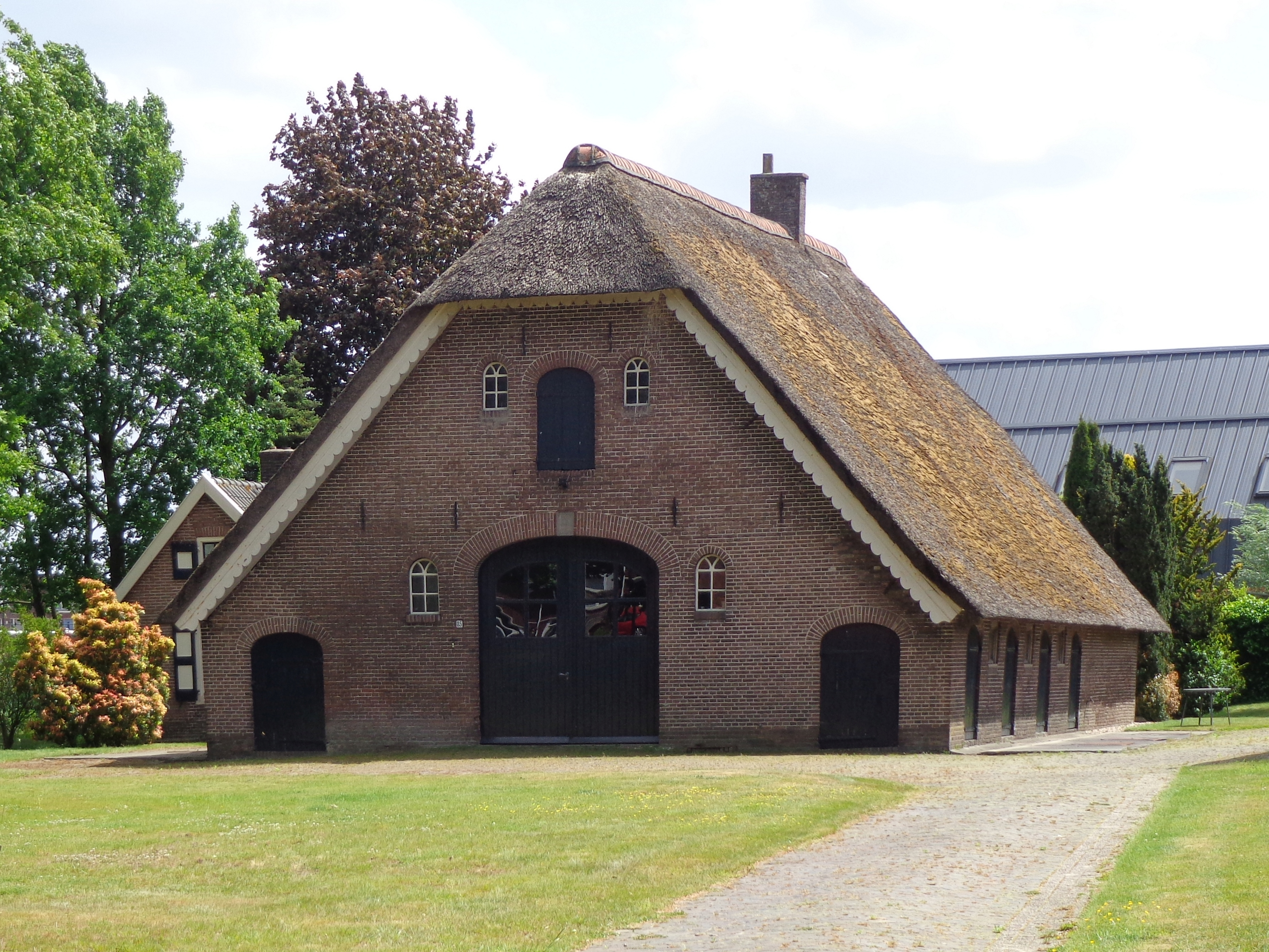
- Farm in Hooglanderveen

- Location in the Netherlands Hooglanderveen (Netherlands)
- Coordinates: 52°11′20″N 5°25′45″E
- Country: Netherlands
- Province: Utrecht
- Municipality: Amersfoort

Area
  - Total: 1.08 km^{2} (0.42 sq mi)
- Elevation: 2 m (6.6 ft)

Population (2022)
  - Total: 4,910
  - Density: 4,550/km^{2} (11,800/sq mi)
- Time zone: UTC+1 (CET)
  - Summer (DST): UTC+2 (CEST)
- Postal code: 3829
- Dialing code: 033

Hooglanderveen (Dutch pronunciation: [ˌɦoːxlɑndərˈveːn]) is a village in the Dutch province of Utrecht. It is a part of the municipality of Amersfoort, and lies about 4 km northeast of Amersfoort. It is notable for the presence of a large Catholic church.

Formerly, the village of Hooglanderveen was located outside of the city limits of Amersfoort, but the new residential areas of Nieuwland and Vathorst now mean that Hooglanderveen is surrounded by the city from three sides.

It was first mentioned in 1899 as Hooglanderveen, and means moorland of Hoogland. In 1918, a Catholic church was built in Hooglanderveen.

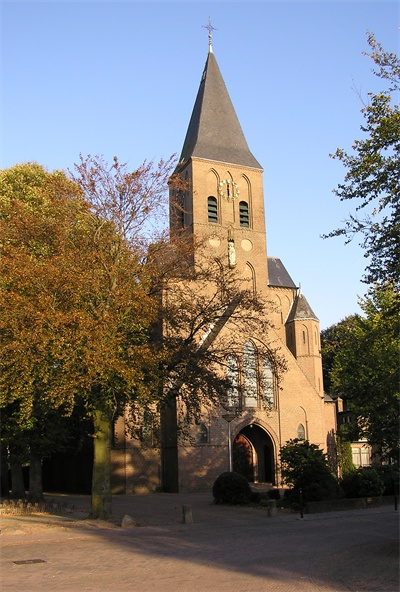
The church of Hooglanderveen
