= Breedeveen =

- Hamlet
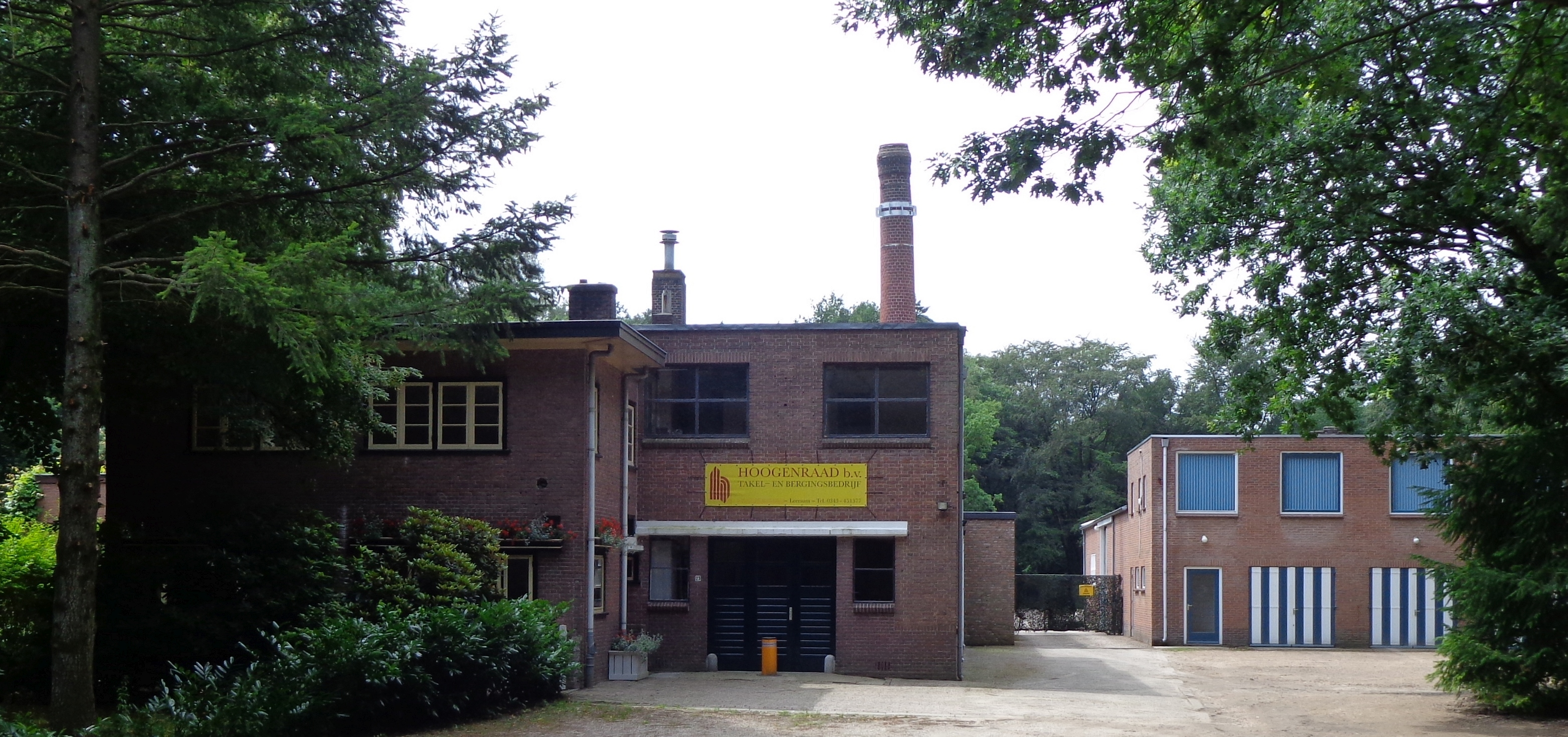
- Company at Breedeveen

- Location in the Netherlands Breedeveen (Netherlands)
- Coordinates: 52°1′25″N 5°25′4″E
- Country: Netherlands
- Province: Utrecht
- Municipality: Utrechtse Heuvelrug
- Time zone: UTC+1 (CET)
  - Summer (DST): UTC+2 (CEST)
- Postal code: 3931
- Dialing code: 033

Breedeveen is a hamlet in the municipality Utrechtse Heuvelrug, in the Dutch province Utrecht. It lies in a forest north of the village of Leersum, on the road from Leersum to Woudenberg.

The hamlet was first mentioned in 1899 Breedeveen, and means "wide bog". It is not a statistical entity, and the postal authorities have placed it under Woudenberg. There are no place name signs. Breedeveen consists of about 25 houses. The nature area Breeveen is located near the hamlet, and is a mixture for forest and heath.

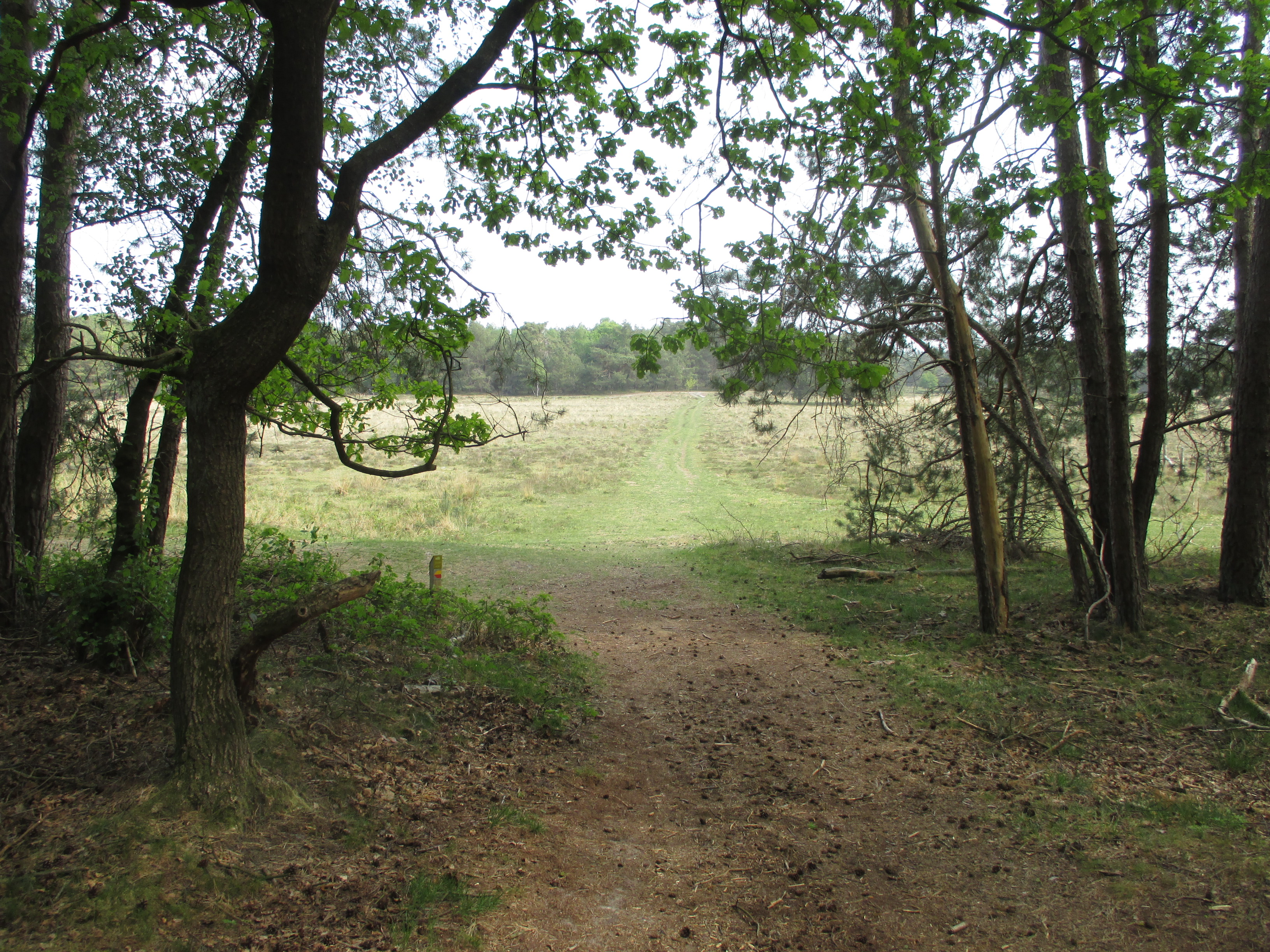
Nature area Breeveen
