= Vinkenkade =

Vinkekade
- Hamlet
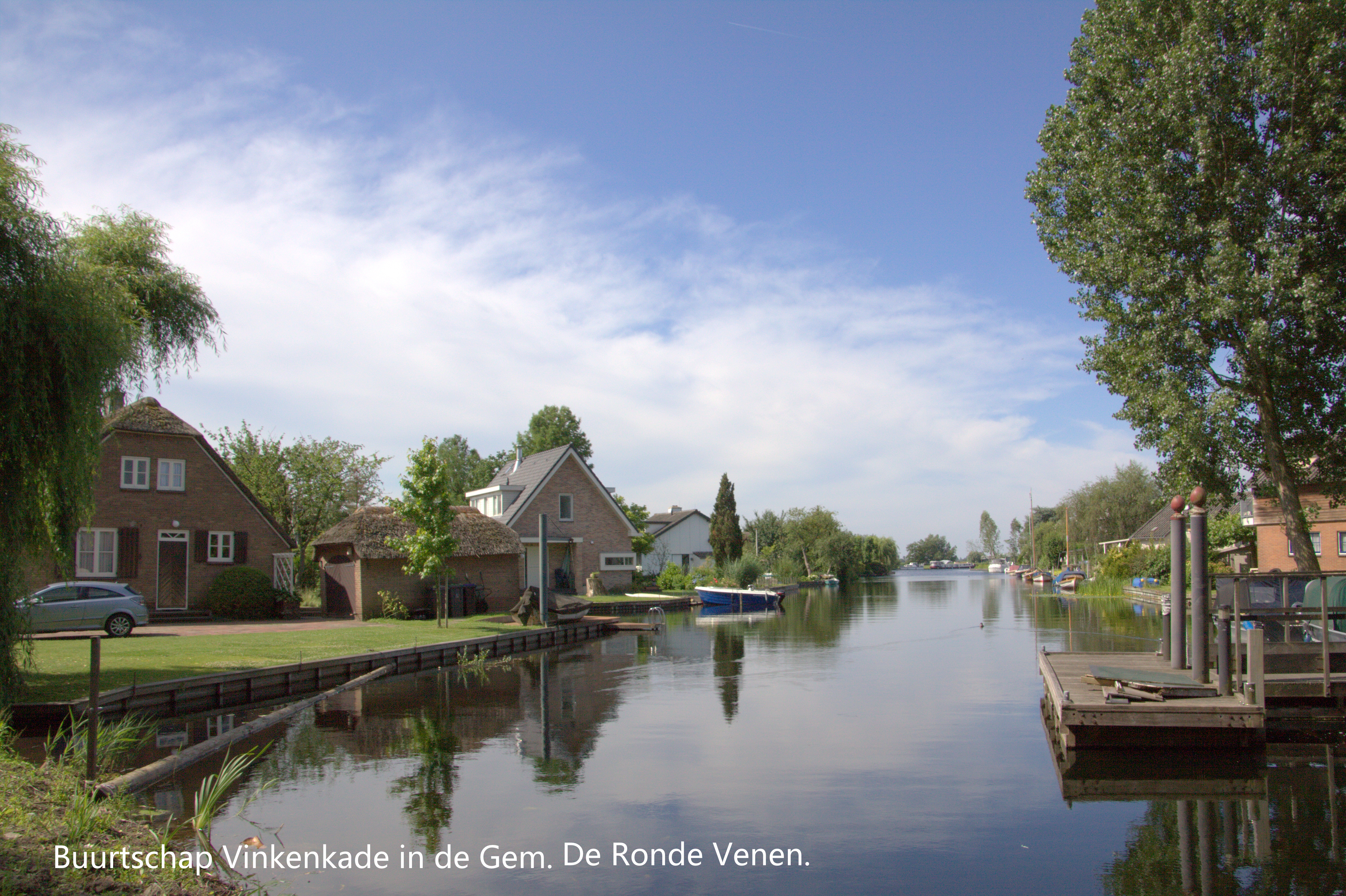

- Location in the Netherlands Vinkekade (Netherlands)
- Coordinates: 52°14′37″N 4°58′12″E
- Country: Netherlands
- Province: Utrecht
- Municipality: De Ronde Venen
- Time zone: UTC+1 (CET)
  - Summer (DST): UTC+2 (CEST)
- Postal code: 3645
- Dialing code: 0297

Vinkenkade is a hamlet in the Dutch province of Utrecht. It is located in the municipality of De Ronde Venen, about 5 km northeast of Vinkeveen. Vinkenkade consists of a single road, parallel to the A2 highway Amsterdam-Utrecht. The road is situated on a quay ("kade" in Dutch), which forms the northeast shore of the lake area Vinkeveensche Plassen.

It was first mentioned between 1839 and 1859 as "De Vinkenkade of Groenland", and means "quay with inferior peat". Vinkenkade is not a statistical entity, and the postal authorities have placed it under Vinkeveen. Vinkenkade has no place name signs, and consists of about 120 houses and about 310 holiday homes.
