= Middelkoop =

- Hamlet
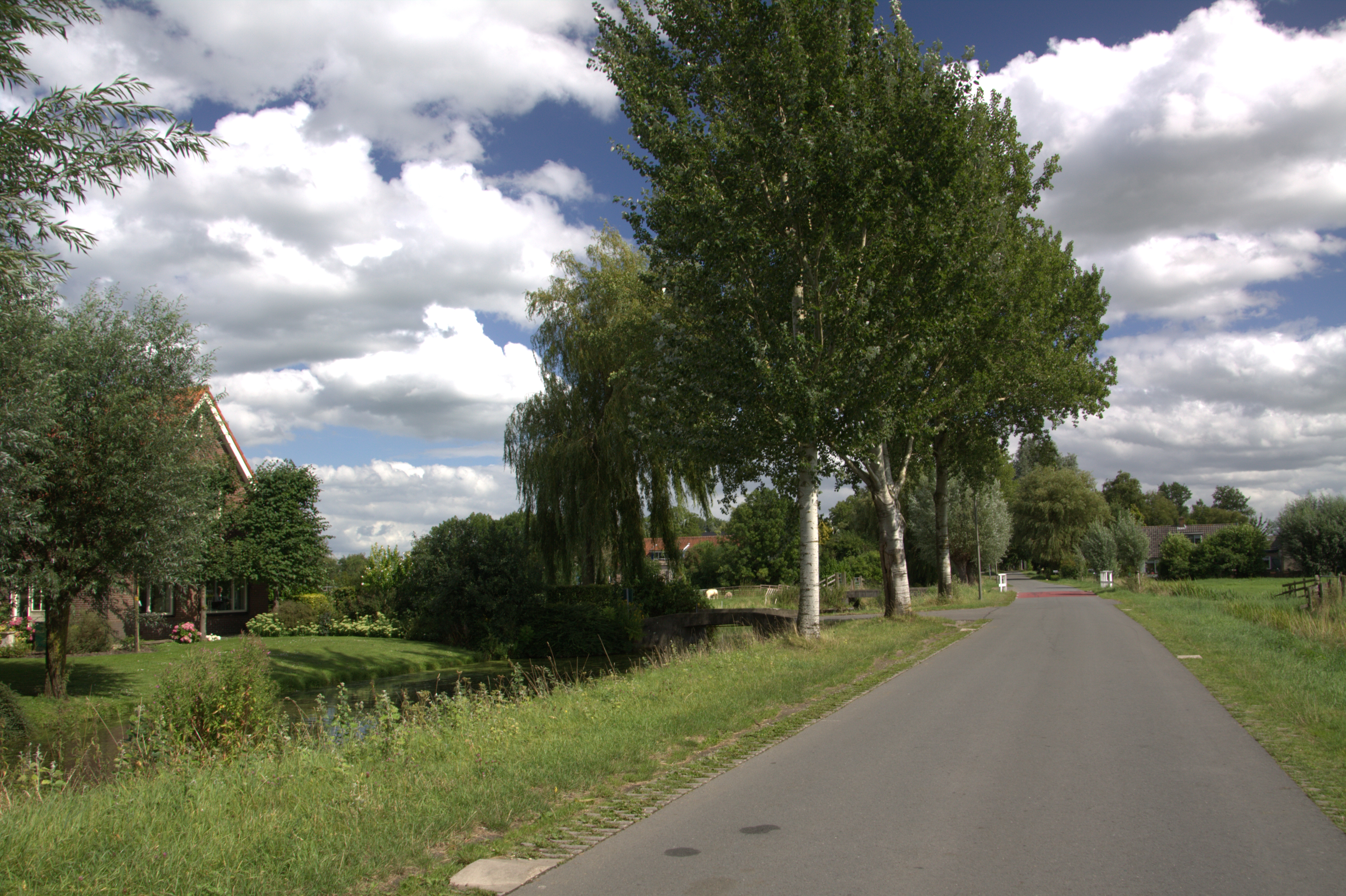

- Location in the Netherlands Middelkoop (Netherlands)
- Coordinates: 51.92040°N 5.06037°E
- Country: Netherlands
- Province: Utrecht
- Municipality: Vijfheerenlanden

Area
  - Total: 5.22 km^{2} (2.02 sq mi)

Population (2021)
  - Total: 340
  - Density: 65/km^{2} (170/sq mi)
- Time zone: UTC+1 (CET)
  - Summer (DST): UTC+2 (CEST)
- Postal code: 4245
- Dialing code: 0345

Middelkoop is a hamlet in the Dutch province of Utrecht. It is a part of the municipality of Vijfheerenlanden, and lies about 11 km south of IJsselstein.

The hamlet was first mentioned in 1333 as Middelcoep, and means "concession in the middle". Middelkoop has no place name signs, and the postal authorities have placed it under Leerbroek. In 1840, it was home to 298 people.

== Gallery ==
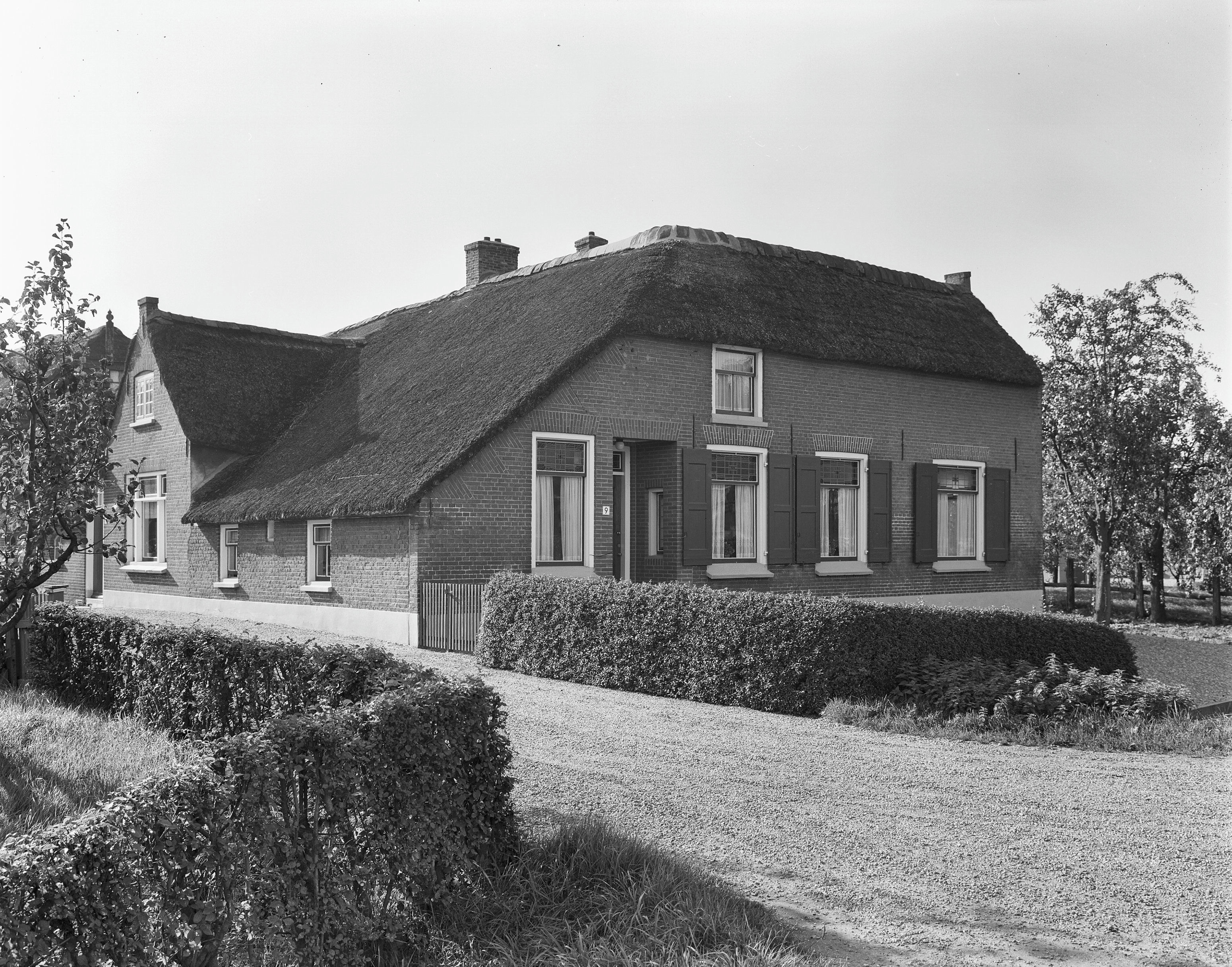
Farm in Middelkoop

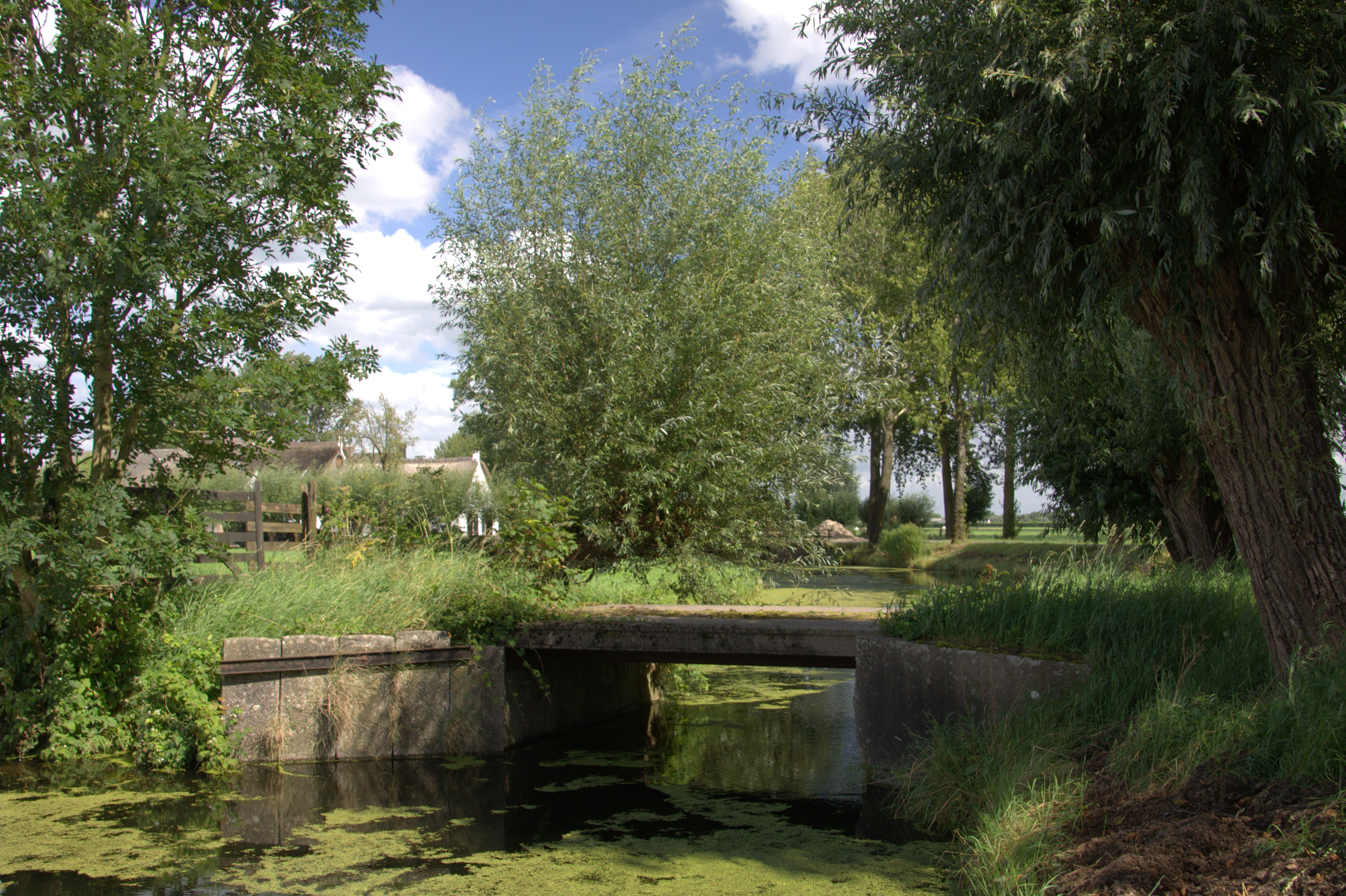
View on Middelkoop
