= Lexmond =

- Village
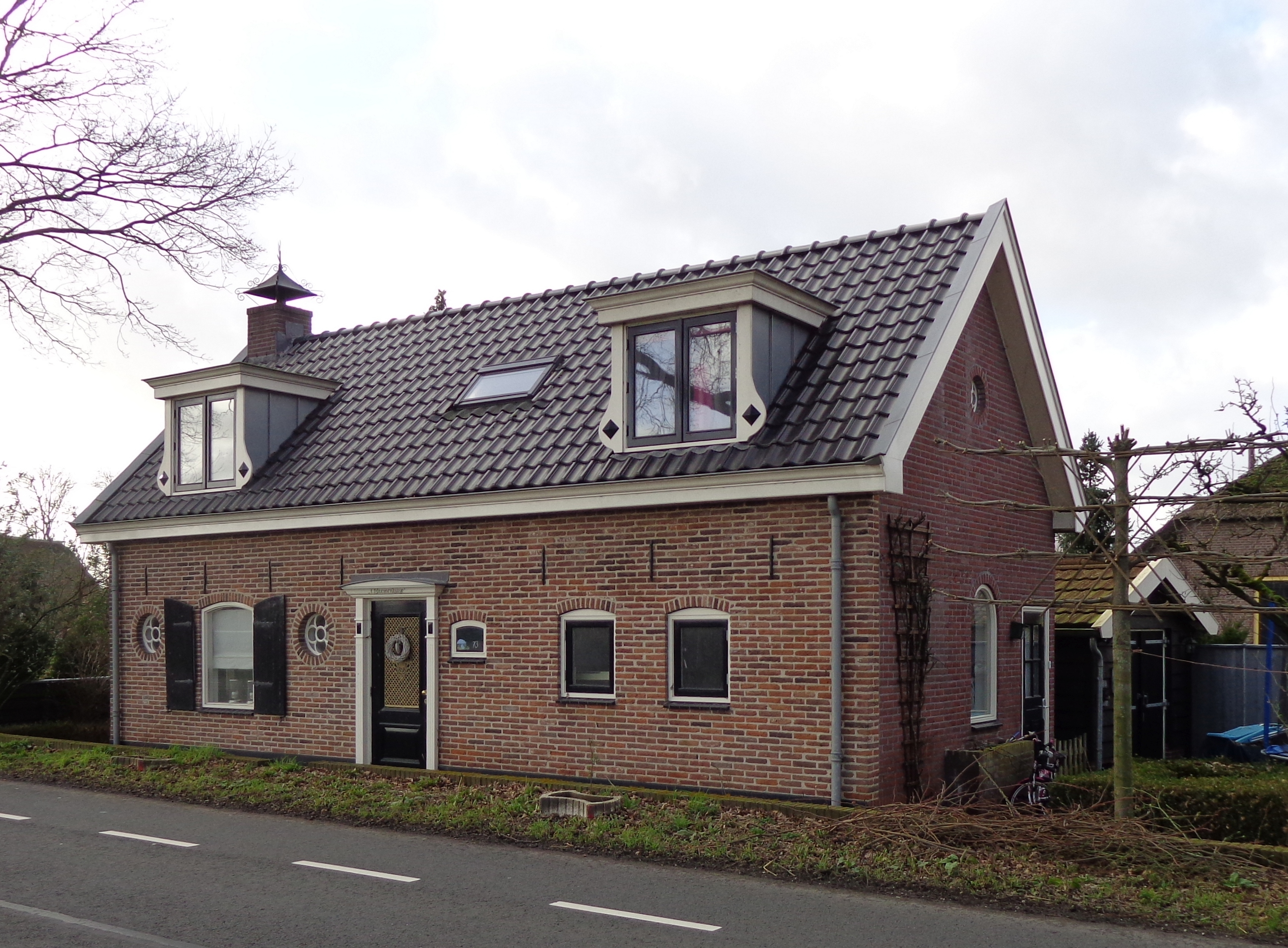

- Flag Coat of arms

- Location in the Netherlands Lexmond (Netherlands)
- Coordinates: 51.9620°N 5.0351°E
- Country: Netherlands
- Province: Utrecht
- Municipality: Vijfheerenlanden

Area
  - Total: 22.82 km^{2} (8.81 sq mi)
- Elevation: 2 m (6.6 ft)

Population (2021)
  - Total: 2,960
  - Density: 130/km^{2} (336/sq mi)
- Time zone: UTC+1 (CET)
  - Summer (DST): UTC+2 (CEST)
- Postal code: 4128
- Dialing code: 0347

Lexmond is a village in the Dutch province of Utrecht. It is a part of the municipality of Vijfheerenlanden, and lies about 7 km south of IJsselstein.

Lexmond was a separate municipality in the province of South Holland until 1986, when it became part of Zederik. When Zederik merged into the new municipality Vijfheerenlanden in 2019, it became a part of the province of Utrecht.

== History ==
The village was first mentioned in 1180 as Lakesmunde, and means "mouth of the Laak (river)". Lexmond started as a dike village along the Lek River. In 1277, the Laak was dammed and a little harbour was constructed. The Dutch Reformed Church dates from the 14th century and was extensively restored between 1954 and 1958. In 1840, it was home to 700 people.

== Gallery ==
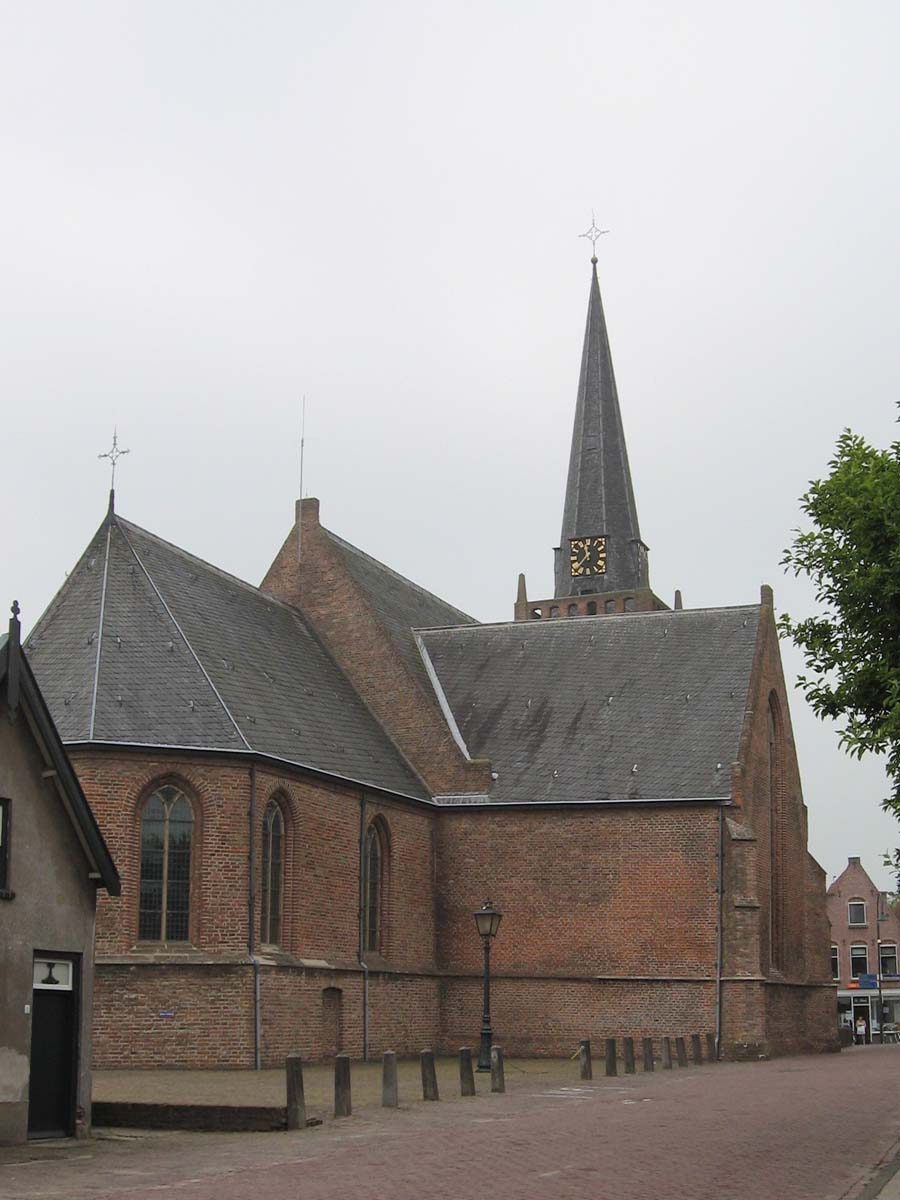
New Reformed Church

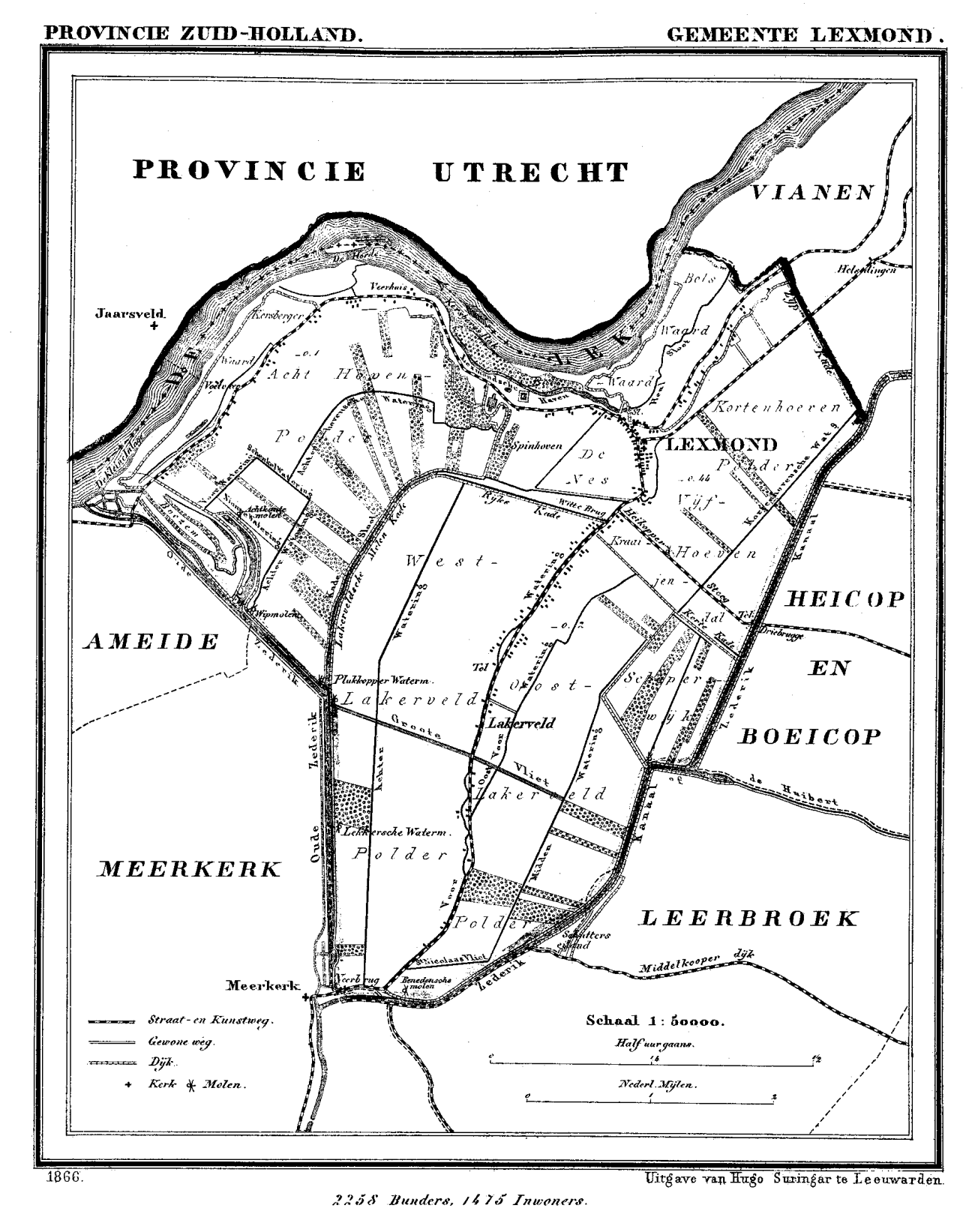
Lexmond in 1866.

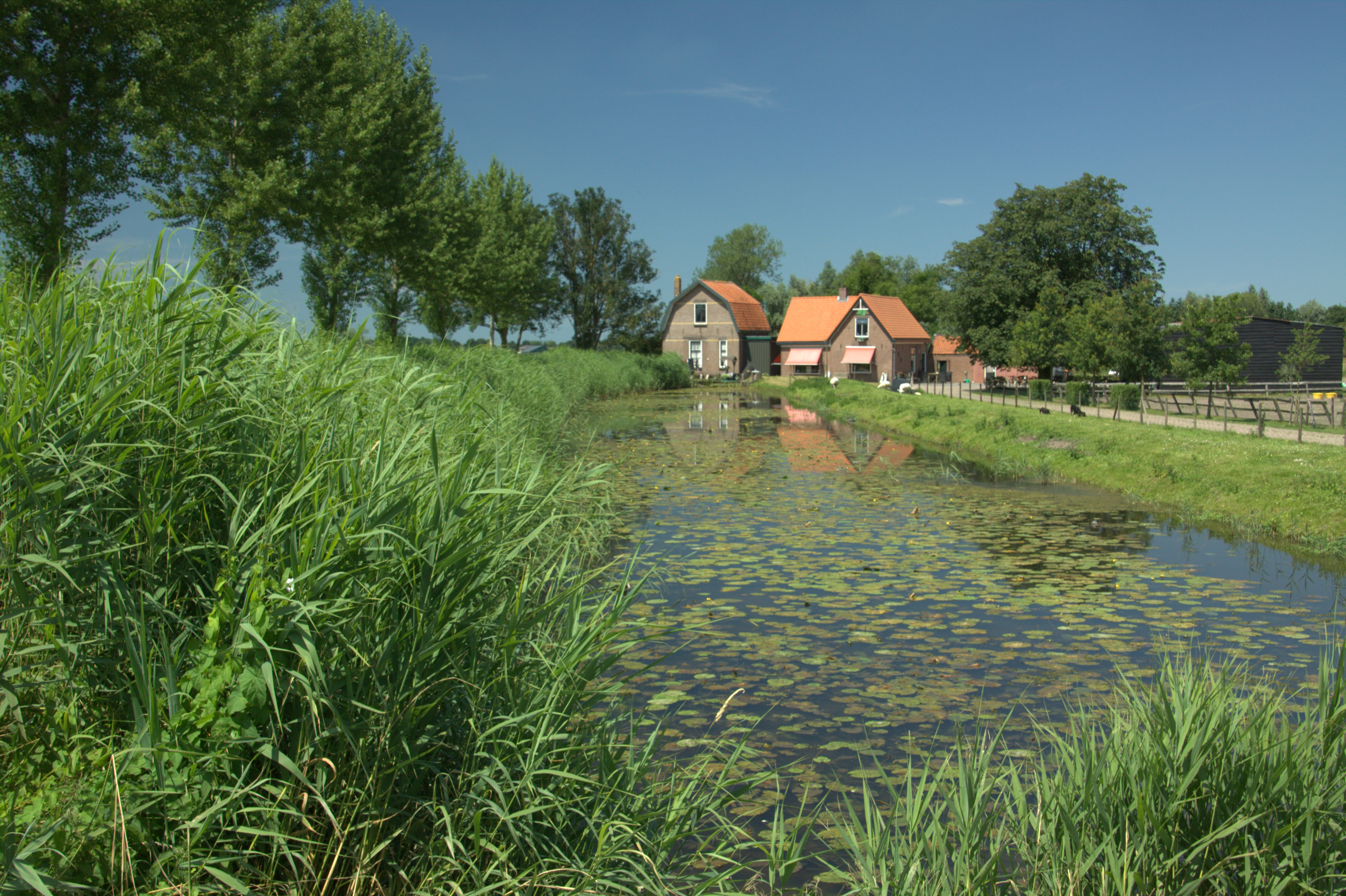
View on the pumping station

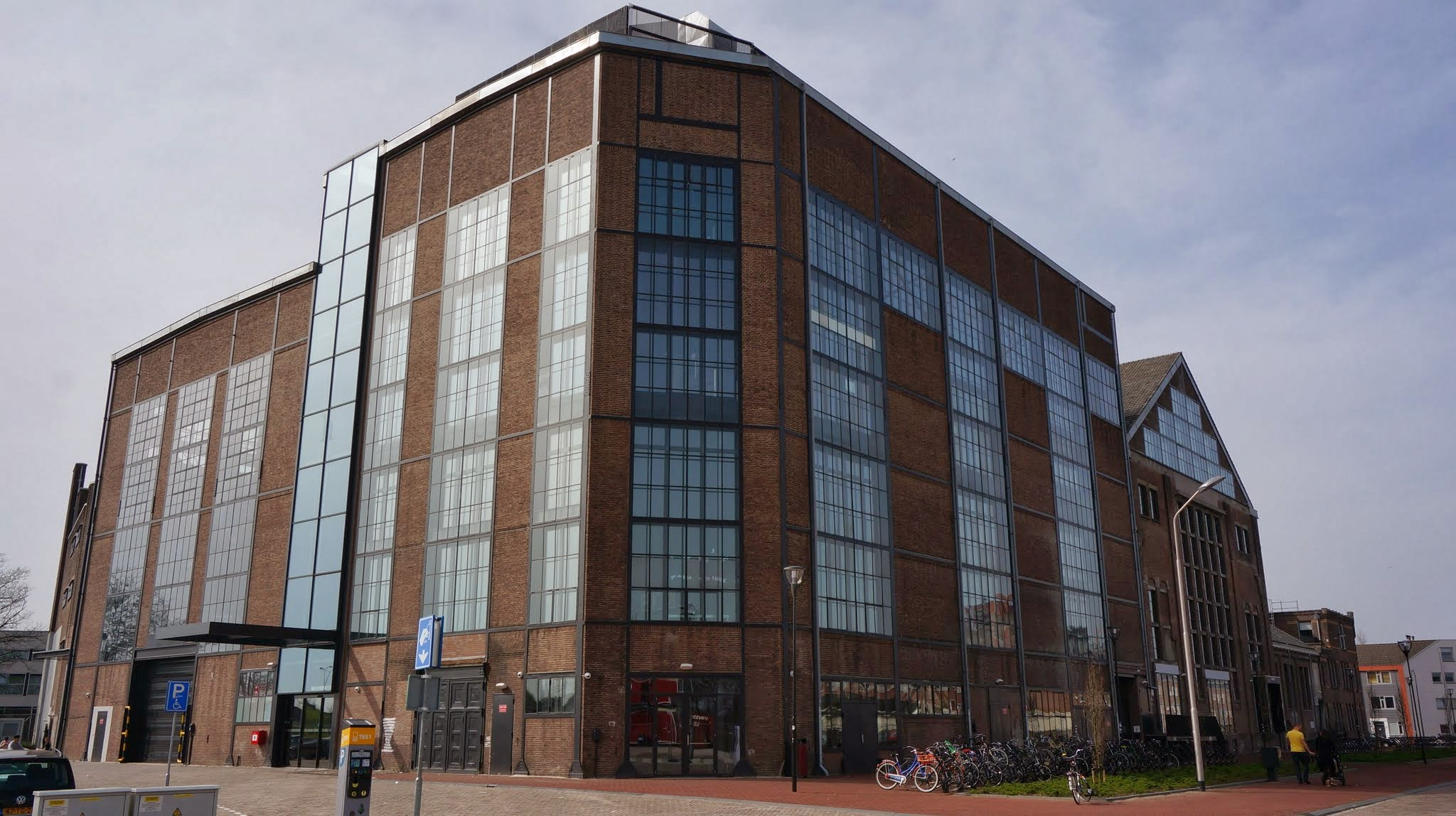
