= Breudijk =

- Hamlet
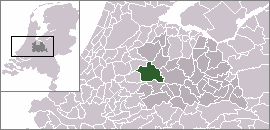

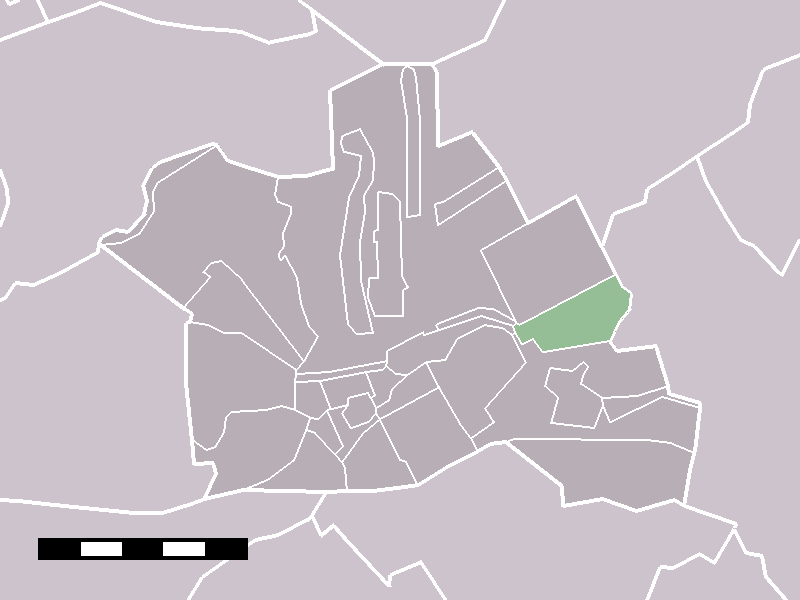
- The statistical district of Breudijk in the municipality of Woerden.
- Coordinates: 52°06′04″N 4°57′18″E
- Country: Netherlands
- Province: Utrecht
- Municipality: Woerden

Population (1 January 2005)
  - Total: 190
- Time zone: UTC+1 (CET)
  - Summer (DST): UTC+2 (CEST)

Breudijk is a hamlet in the Dutch province of Utrecht. It is a part of the municipality of Woerden, and lies about 5 km northeast of Woerden.

The statistical district "Breudijk", which covers the hamlet and the surrounding countryside, has a population of around 190.

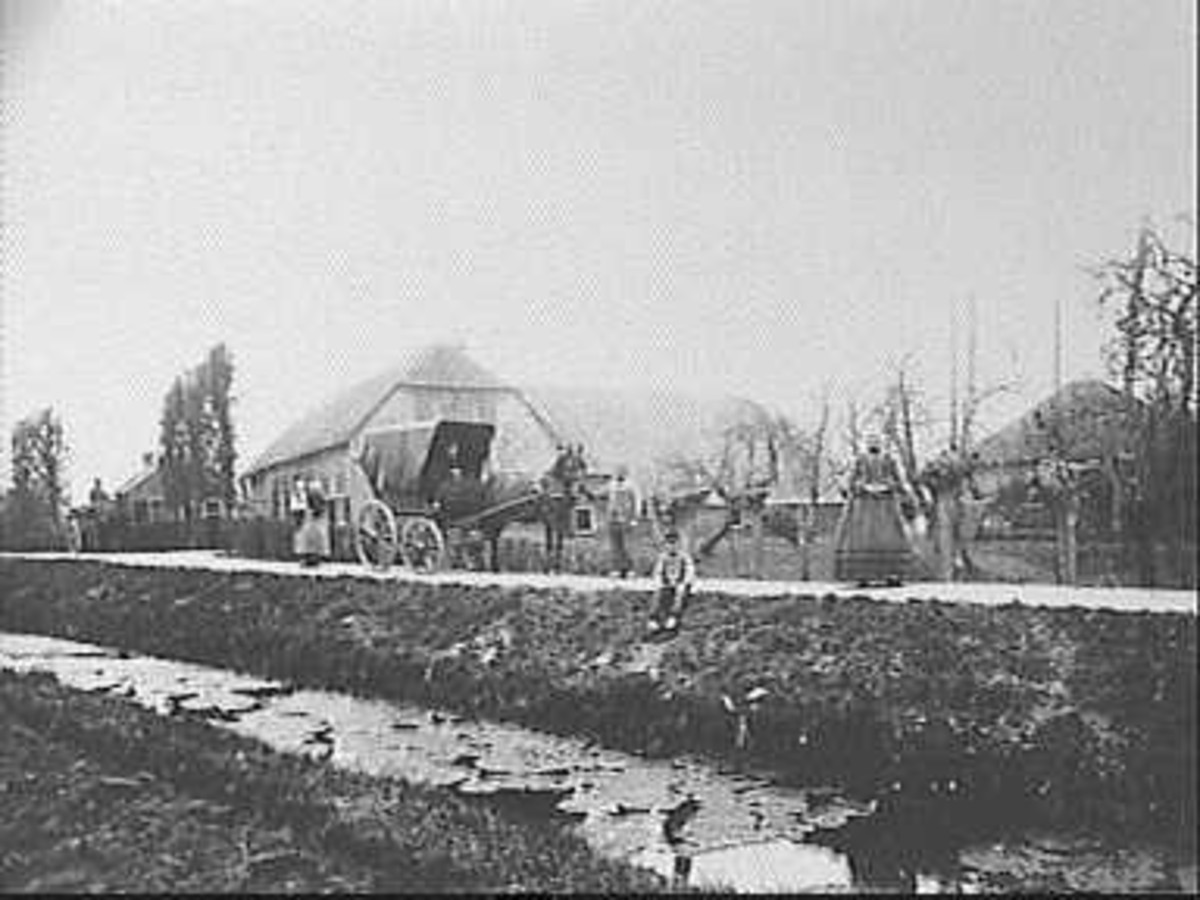
Breudijk, ca. 1900

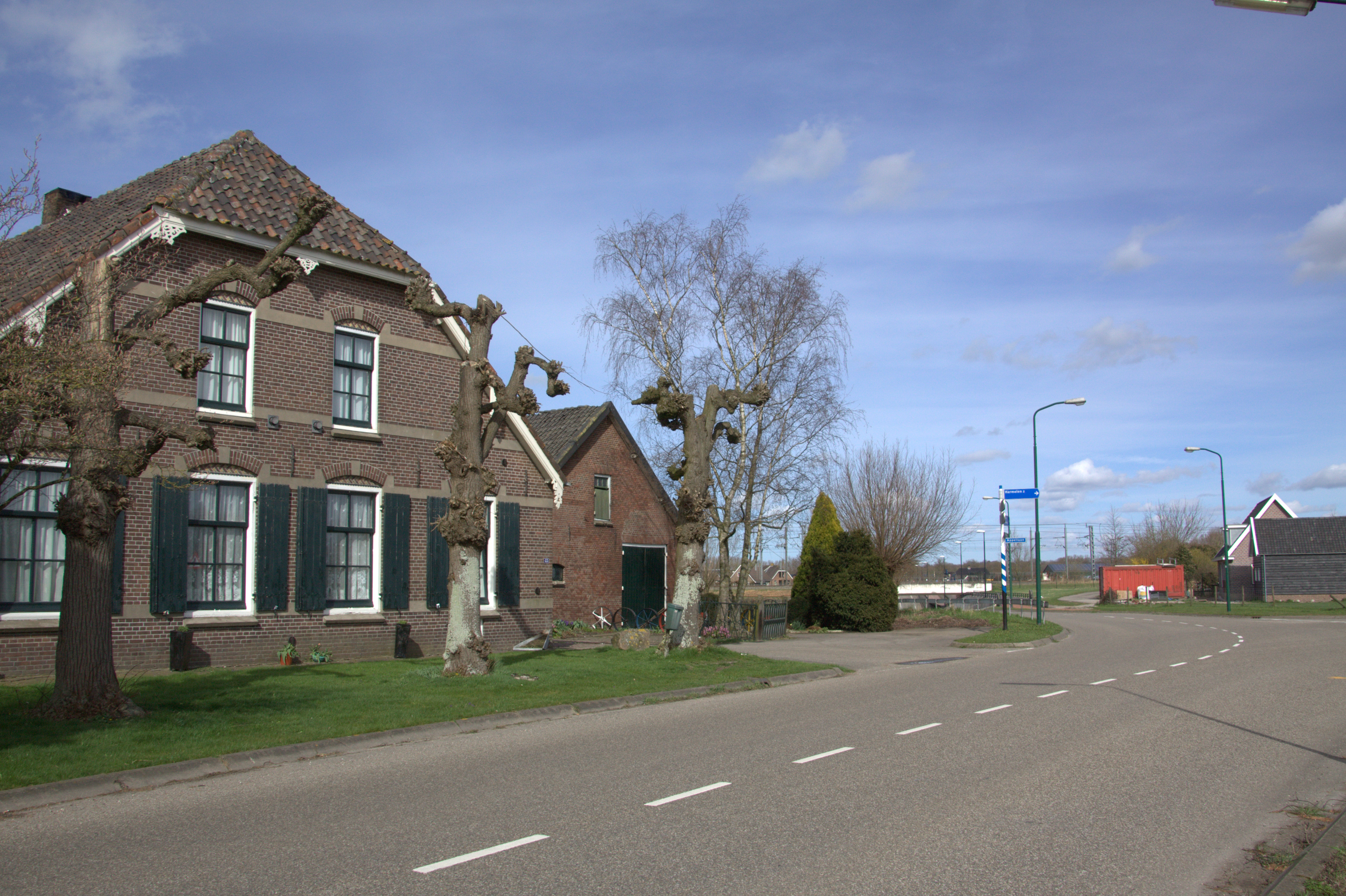
Breudijk, 2017

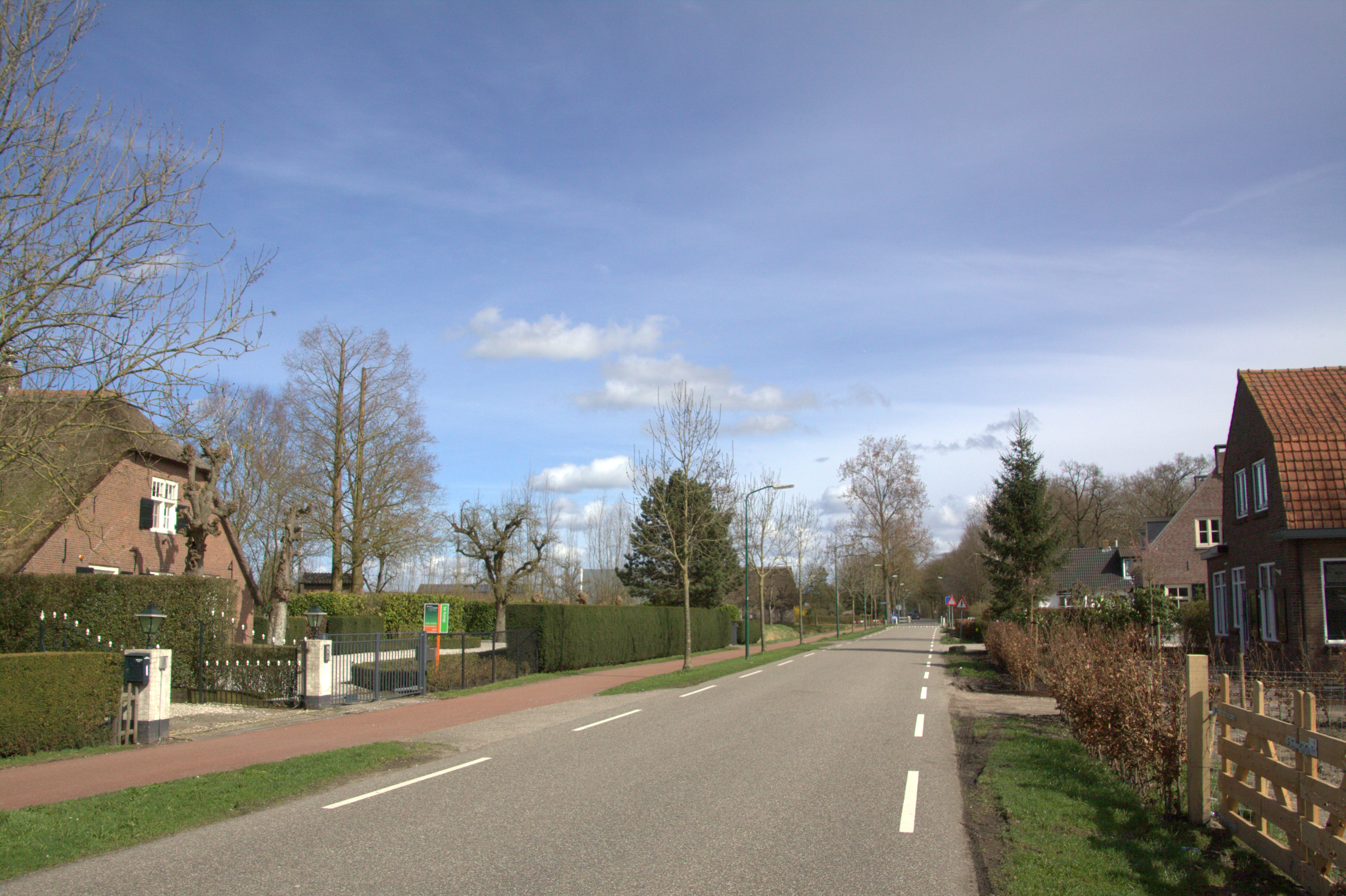
Breudijk, 2017
