= Nieuwe-Wetering =

- Hamlet
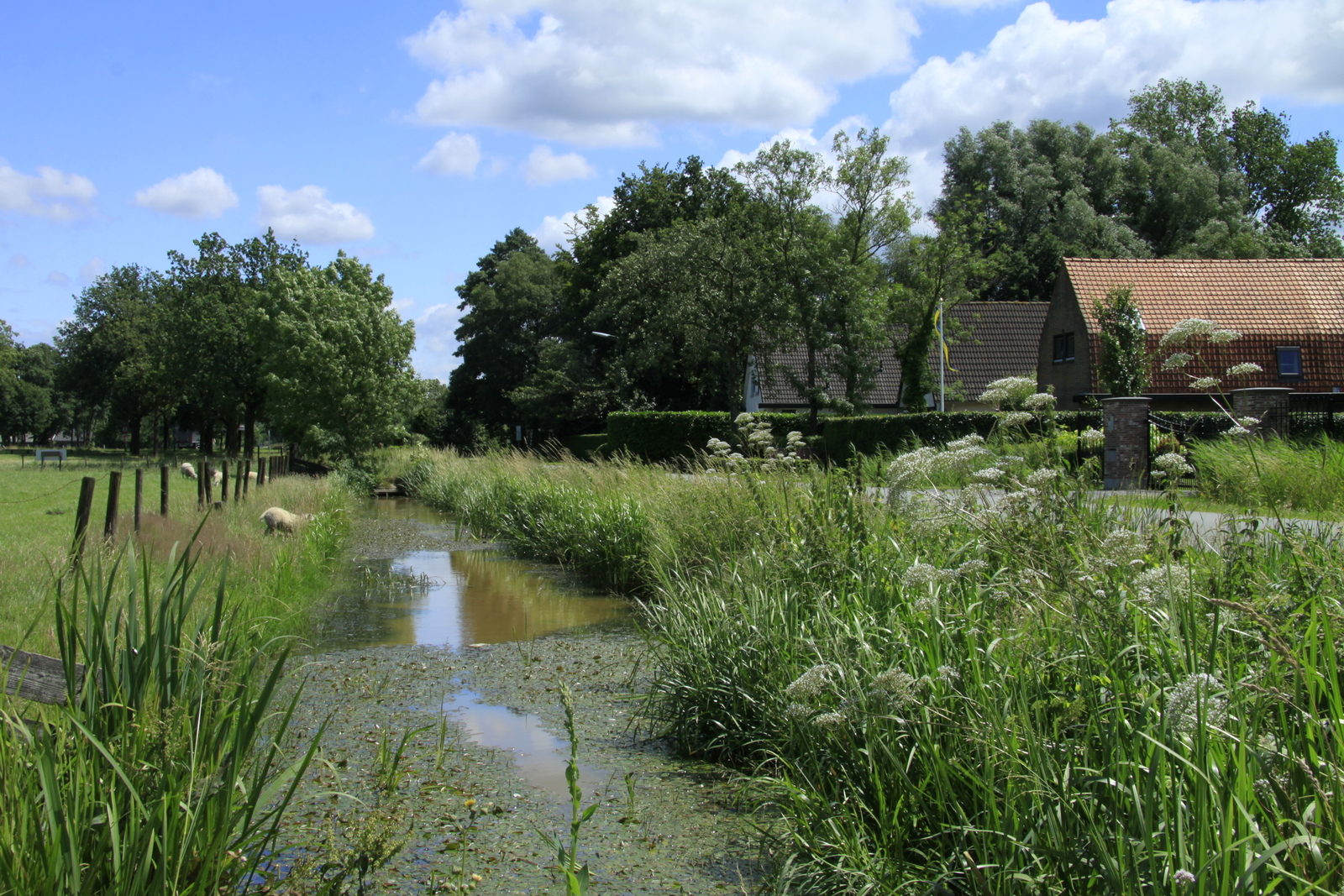

- Location in the Netherlands Nieuwe-Wetering (Netherlands)
- Coordinates: 52.1400°N 5.1651°E
- Country: Netherlands
- Province: Utrecht
- Municipality: De Bilt
- Time zone: UTC+1 (CET)
  - Summer (DST): UTC+2 (CEST)
- Postal code: 3737
- Dialing code: 0346

Nieuwe-Wetering is a hamlet in the Dutch province of Utrecht. It is a part of the municipality of De Bilt, and lies about 3 km northwest of Bilthoven.

It was first mentioned in 1846 as Nieuwe-Wetering (de), and means the new polder canal. Nieuwe-Wetering is not a statistical entity, and the postal authorities have placed it under Groenekan. Nieuwe-Wetering has put up its own place name signs. In 1840, it was home to 65 people. Nowadays, it consists of about 20 houses.

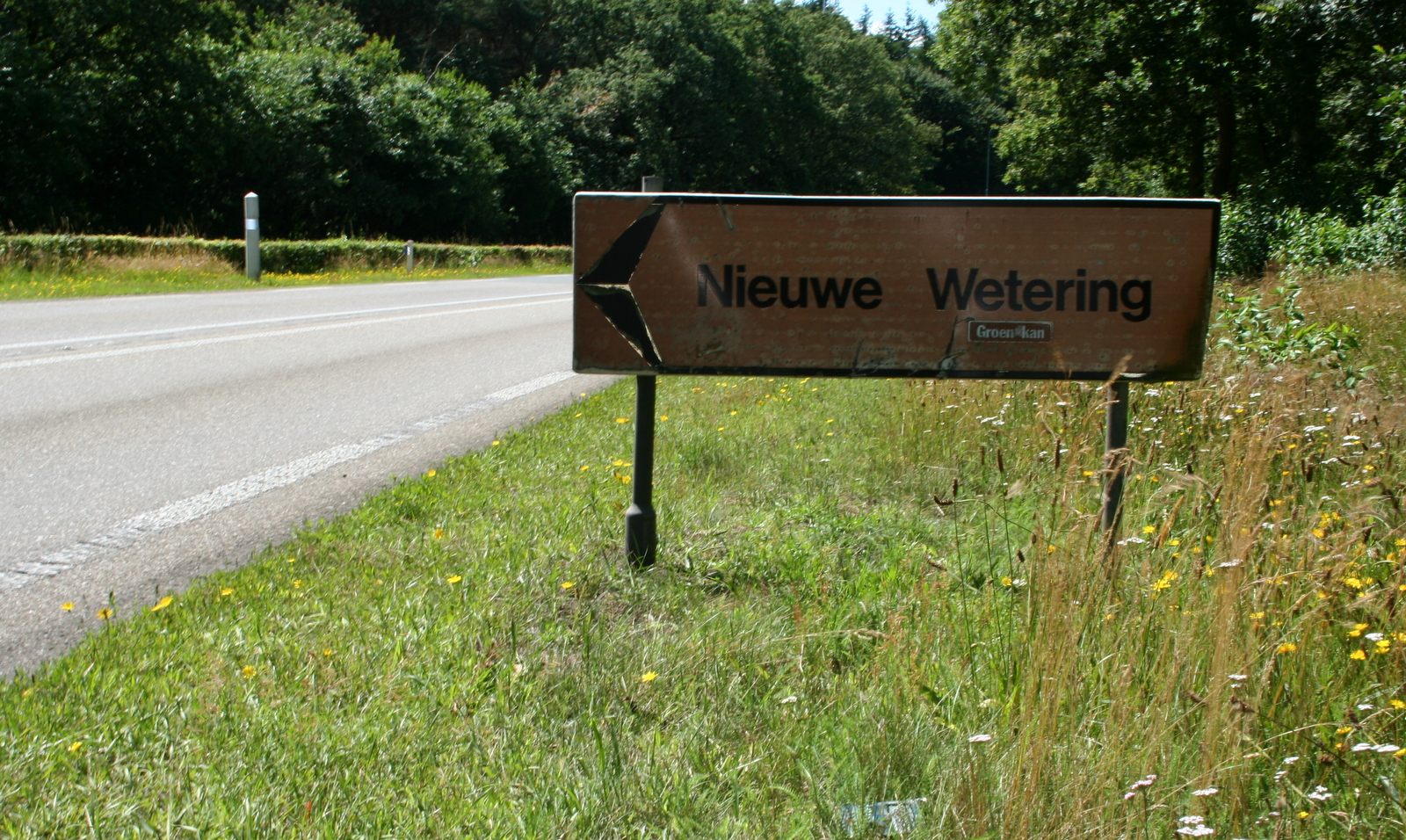
Home made place name sign
