= List of manors in Utrecht =

This is a list of heerlijkheden (manors) in Utrecht.

The rural parts of the province of Utrecht in the Netherlands was divided into heerlijkheden (manors). Around 1800, heerlijkheden were replaced as local jurisdictions with municipalities. See List of municipalities of Utrecht for a list of those.

Below is a complete list of manors in 1795.

- 's-Gravensloot
- 't Gein
- Abcoude-Baambrugge
- Abcoude-Proosdij
- Achthoven, Montfoort
- Achttienhoven
- Amelisweerd
- Amerongen
- Ankeveen
- Aschat
- Baarn
- Blokland, South Holland
- Blokland, Utrecht
- Breukelen Nijenrode
- Breukelen Ortsgerecht
- Breukelen-Proosdij
- Breukelerveen
- Breukelerwaard
- Bunnik en Vechten
- Bunschoten
- Colenberg
- Cothen
- Darthuizen
- De Bilt en Oostbroek
- De Breul
- De Haar
- De Hegge op Themaat
- Demmerik
- Diemerbroek en Papekop
- Dijkveld en Rateles
- Doorn
- Drakestein
- Driebergen
- Duist, De Haar en Zevenhuizen
- Eemnes Binnendijks
- Eemnes Buitendijks
- Galekop
- Gerverskop in westeinde van Harmelen en Breudijk
- Gieltjesdorp
- Groenestein
- Grote Koppel
- Hagestein
- Hardenbroek
- Harmelen en Haanwijk
- Harmelerwaard
- Heemstede
- Heeswijk
- Hoenkoop
- Hoge en Lage Vuursche
- Honswijk
- Hoogland en Emiklaar
- Houten en 't Goy
- Isselt
- Kamerik-Houdijk
- Kamerik-Mijzijde
- Kattenbroek
- Kattenbroek
- Kersbergen
- Kleine Koppel
- Kockengen-Lokhorstgerecht
- Kockengen-Montfoortsgerecht
- Kortenhoef en Riethoven
- Kudelstaart
- Lage en Hoge Vuursche
- Laag-Nieuwkoop
- Lange en Ruige Weide
- Langerak
- Leersum, Ginkel en Zuilenstein
- Leusden
- Linschoten en Mastwijk
- Linschoter Haar
- Loefsgerecht van Ruwiel
- Loenen
- Loenersloot-Oukoop-Ter Aa
- Lopik
- Maarn en Maarsbergen
- Maarschalkerweerd
- Maarssen
- Maarssenbroek
- Maarsseveen
- Mijdrecht
- Neder-Langbroek
- Nedereinde van Jutphaas
- Nigtevecht
- Nijendijk (Dwarsdijk)
- Noordeinde van Portengen
- Odijk
- Oost-Raven
- Oostveense landen
- Oostwaard
- Oudenrijn en Heikop
- Oudhuizen
- Oudwulven en Waaien
- Oukoop
- Over-Langbroek
- Overeinde van Jutphaas
- Overmeer
- Papendorp
- Polanen
- Reijerscop-Kreuningen
- Reijerscop-Meerloo
- Renswoude
- Rhijnauwen
- Rijnhuizen
- Rijsenburg
- Rosweide
- Ruwiel
- Schagen en de Eng
- Schalkwijk
- Schonauwen
- Slachtmaat
- Soest en de Birkt
- Spengen
- Sterkenburg
- Stoetwegen
- Stoutenburg
- Tamen en Uithoorn
- Ter Eem (Eembrugge)
- Themaat op den Eng
- Themaat
- Tienhoven
- Tull en 't Waal
- Uiterdijken van Mastwijk
- Veenendaal
- Veldhuizen
- Vijfhoeven
- Vinkeveen
- Vleuten
- Vlooswijk, Oostwijk en Kromwijk
- Vreeland
- Vreeswijk
- Werkhoven
- West-Raven
- Westbroek
- Willeskop en Kort Heeswijk
- Willige Langerak
- Wilnis en Westveen
- Woudenberg
- Wulven
- Wulverhorst
- Zegveld
- Zeist
- Zuideinde van Portengen
- Zuilen en Zwezereng

== See also ==
- List of castles in the Netherlands#Utrecht
