= List of municipalities in Utrecht =

This list contains all present and former municipalities in the Dutch province of Utrecht since 1812, when it was first divided into municipalities (gemeenten). Before then, it consisted of 5 cities and about 140 manors (see list of manors in Utrecht). Since 2011, Utrecht has had 26 municipalities.

| Municipality | From - To | Now part of | Remarks |
|---|---|---|---|
| Abcoude | 1941 - 2011 | De Ronde Venen | |
| Abcoude-Baambrugge | 1812 - 1941 | Abcoude >> De Ronde Venen | |
| Abcoude-Proostdij | 1812 - 1941 | Abcoude >> De Ronde Venen | |
| Abstede | 1818 - 1823 | Utrecht | |
| Achthoven | 1812 - 1857 | Linschoten >> Montfoort | |
| Achttienhoven | 1815 - 1954 | Westbroek >> Maartensdijk >> De Bilt | |
| Amerongen | 1812 - 2006 | Utrechtse Heuvelrug | |
| Amersfoort | 1812 - | | |
| Baarn | 1812 - | | |
| Benschop | 1812 - 1989 | Lopik | |
| Breukelen | 1812 - 1815; 1949 - 2011 | Stichtse Vecht | |
| Breukelen-Nijenrode | 1815 - 1949 | Breukelen >> Stichtse Vecht | |
| Breukelen-Sint Pieters | 1815 - 1949 | Breukelen >> Stichtse Vecht | |
| Bunnik | 1812 - | | |
| Bunschoten | 1812 - | | |
| Cabauw | 1817 - 1857 | Willige Langerak >> Lopik | Until 1820 part of Holland. |
| Catharijne | 1818 - 1823 | Utrecht | |
| Cothen | 1812 - 1996 | Wijk bij Duurstede | |
| Darthuizen | 1818 - 1857 | Leersum >> Utrechtse Heuvelrug | |
| De Bilt | 1812 - | | |
| De Ronde Venen | 1989 - | | |
| De Vuursche | 1815 - 1857 | Baarn | |
| Doorn | 1812 - 2006 | Utrechtse Heuvelrug | |
| Driebergen | 1812 - 1931 | Driebergen-Rijsenburg >> Utrechtse Heuvelrug | |
| Driebergen-Rijsenburg | 1931 - 2006 | Utrechtse Heuvelrug | |
| Duist | 1815 - 1857 | Hoogland >> Amersfoort, Bunschoten | |
| Eemnes | 1812 - | | |
| Gerverskop | 1818 - 1857 | Harmelen >> Woerden | |
| 's-Gravesloot | 1815 - 1857 | Kamerik >> Woerden | |
| Haarzuilens | 1815 - 1954 | Vleuten >> Utrecht | |
| Harmelen | 1812 - 2001 | Woerden | |
| Hoenkoop | 1815 - 1970 | Oudewater | |
| Hoogland | 1812 - 1974 | Amersfoort, Bunschoten | |
| Houten | 1812 - | | |
| Indijk | 1817 - 1821 | Harmelen >> Woerden | |
| IJsselstein | 1812 - | | IJsselstein used to be an independent barony. |
| Jaarsveld | 1812 - 1943 | Lopik | |
| Jutphaas | 1812 - 1971 | Nieuwegein | |
| Kamerik | 1812 - 1815 1857 - 1989 | Woerden | |
| Kamerik Houtdijken | 1815 - 1857 | Kamerik >> Woerden | |
| Kamerik Mijzijde | 1815 - 1857 | Kamerik >> Woerden | |
| Kockengen | 1812 - 1989 | Breukelen >> Stichtse Vecht | |
| Laagnieuwkoop | 1815 - 1942 | Breukelen >> Stichtse Vecht | |
| Langbroek | 1812 - 1996 | Wijk bij Duurstede | |
| Lauwerecht | 1818 - 1823 | Utrecht | |
| Leersum | 1812 - 2006 | Utrechtse Heuvelrug | |
| Leusden | 1812 - | | |
| Linschoten | 1812 - 1989 | Montfoort, Woerden | |
| Loenen | 1812 - 2011 | Stichtse Vecht | |
| Loenersloot | 1815 - 1964 | Loenen >> Stichtse Vecht | |
| Loosdrecht | 1812 - 2002 | Wijdemeren | Loosdrecht is now part of North Holland. |
| Lopik | 1812 - | | |
| Maarn | 1815 - 2006 | Utrechtse Heuvelrug | |
| Maarssen | 1812 - 2011 | Stichtse Vecht | |
| Maarssenbroek | 1815 - 1857 | Maarssen >> Stichtse Vecht | |
| Maarsseveen | 1815 - 1949 | Maarssen >> Stichtse Vecht | |
| Maartensdijk | 1812 - 2001 | De Bilt | |
| Mijdrecht | 1812 - 1989 | De Ronde Venen | |
| Montfoort | 1812 - | | |
| Nieuwegein | 1971 - | | |
| Nigtevecht | 1815 - 1989 | Loenen >> Stichtse Vecht | |
| Noord-Polsbroek | 1815 - 1857 | Polsbroek >> Lopik | |
| Odijk | 1815 - 1964 | Bunnik | |
| Oudenrijn | 1815 - 1954 | Utrecht | |
| Oudewater | 1812 - | | Until 1989 part of South Holland |
| Oudhuizen | 1815 - 1857 | De Ronde Venen | |
| Oud-Wulven | 1815 - 1857 | Houten | |
| Polsbroek | 1812 - 1815; 1857 - 1989 | Lopik | |
| Portengen | 1815 - 1857 | Breukelen >> Stichtse Vecht | |
| Renswoude | 1812 - | | |
| Rhenen | 1812 - | | |
| Rhijnauwen | 1815 - 1857 | Bunnik | |
| Rijsenburg | 1815 - 1931 | Driebergen-Rijsenburg >> Utrechtse Heuvelrug | |
| Ruwiel | 1815 - 1964 | Breukelen >> Stichtse Vecht | |
| Schalkwijk | 1812 - 1962 | Houten | |
| Schonauwen | 1815 - 1857 | Houten | |
| Snelrewaard | 1815 - 1989 | Oudewater? | Between 1815 and 1820 part of Holland. |
| Soest | 1812 - | | |
| Sterkenburg | 1815 - 1857 | Driebergen-Rijsenburg >> Utrechtse Heuvelrug | |
| Stichtse Vecht | 2011 - | | |
| Stoutenburg | 1815 - 1969 | Leusden | |
| Teckop | 1812 - 1857 | | From 1805 to 1820 part of Holland. |
| Tienhoven | 1812 - 1957 | Maarssen >> Stichtse Vecht | |
| Tolsteeg | 1818 - 1823 | Utrecht | |
| Tull en 't Waal | 1815 - 1962 | Houten | |
| Utrecht | 1812 - | | |
| Utrechtse Heuvelrug | 2006 - | | |
| Veenendaal | 1812 - | | |
| Veldhuizen | 1815 - 1954 | Utrecht | |
| Vianen | ? - 2019 | Vijfheerenlanden | Before 2002 part of South Holland |
| Vijfheerenlanden | 2019 - | | |
| Vinkeveen | 1812 - 1841 | De Ronde Venen | |
| Vinkeveen en Waverveen | 1841 - 1989 | De Ronde Venen | |
| Vleuten | 1812 - 1954 | Utrecht | |
| Vleuten-De Meern | 1954 - 2001 | Utrecht | |
| Vreeland | 1812 - 1964 | Loenen >> Stichtse Vecht | |
| Vreeswijk | 1812 - 1971 | Nieuwegein | |
| Waverveen | 1812 - 1841 | De Ronde Venen | Before 1819 part of Holland |
| Werkhoven | 1812 - 1964 | Bunnik | |
| Westbroek | 1812 - 1857 | De Bilt (and Maarssen? >> Stichtse Vecht) | |
| Wijk bij Duurstede | 1812 - | | |
| Willeskop | 1815 - 1989 | Montfoort, Oudewater | |
| Willige-Langerak | 1815 - 1943 | Lopik | |
| Wilnis | 1812 - 1989 | De Ronde Venen | |
| Woerden | 1812 - | | Before 1989 part of South Holland |
| Woudenberg | 1812 - | | |
| Wulverhorst | 1815/18 - 1857 | Linschoten >> Montfoort | |
| Zegveld | 1812 - 1989 | Woerden | |
| Zeist | 1812 - | | |
| Zevender | 1812? - 1857 | Lopik | |
| Zuid-Polsbroek | 1815 - 1857 | Polsbroek >> Lopik | Before 1820 part of Holland |
| Zuilen | 1812 - 1954 | Utrecht | |

== See also ==
- List of settlements in Utrecht
