= Heemstede (disambiguation) =

Heemstede may refer to:

- Heemstede, a town in North Holland, the Netherlands
  - Slot Heemstede, a castle in Heemstede
  - Heemstede-Aerdenhout railway station
- Heemstede (Utrecht), a hamlet near Houten in the Netherlands
- Heemstede (Nieuw-Nederland), now Hempstead, New York
