= Laurens Bake =

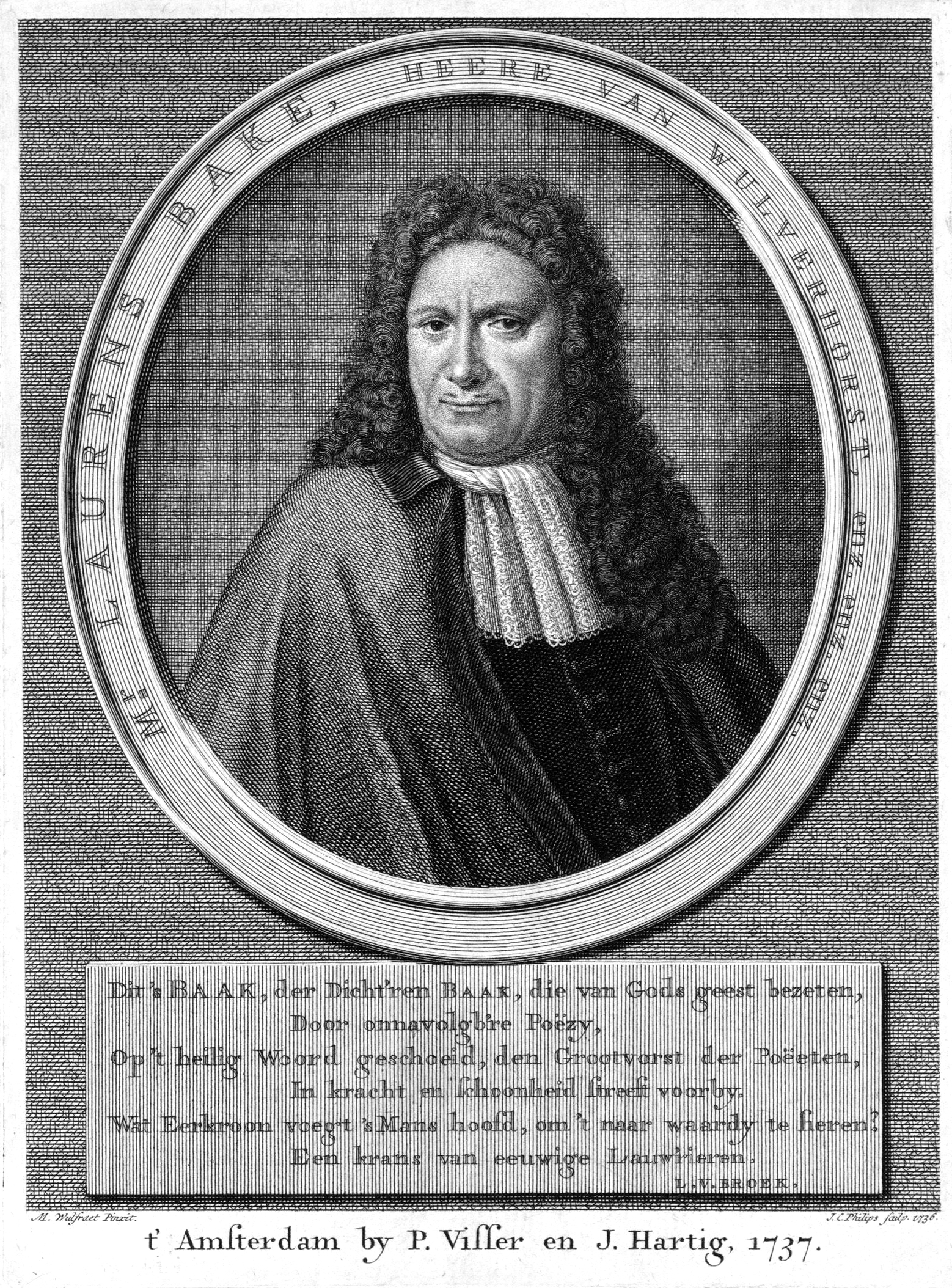
Laurens Bake (Baeck) (after Mathijs Wulfraet)

Laurens Bake or Baak, Baeck (1629, Amsterdam – buried 18 December 1702, Amsterdam) was a Dutch poet of the seventeenth century.

He was born in a distinguished family of Amsterdam, son of the merchant Joost Baeck and Magdalena van Erp, sister-in-law of P.C. Hooft, while his grandfather Laurens Baeck was a close friend of Joost van den Vondel. Laurens studied in Utrecht from 1647, and later liked to be called lord of Wulverhorst, an estate near Utrecht his father had bought in 1671. He was a member of the theater company Nil volentibus arduum and later of "In Magnis Voluisse Sat Est". His most remarkable work is a collection of sacred hymns. A collection of his poems (Mengel-poëzy) was published by Van den Broek, Amsterdam, in 1737. Bake was buried in de Oude Kerk in 1702.
