= Oud-Wulven =

- Hamlet
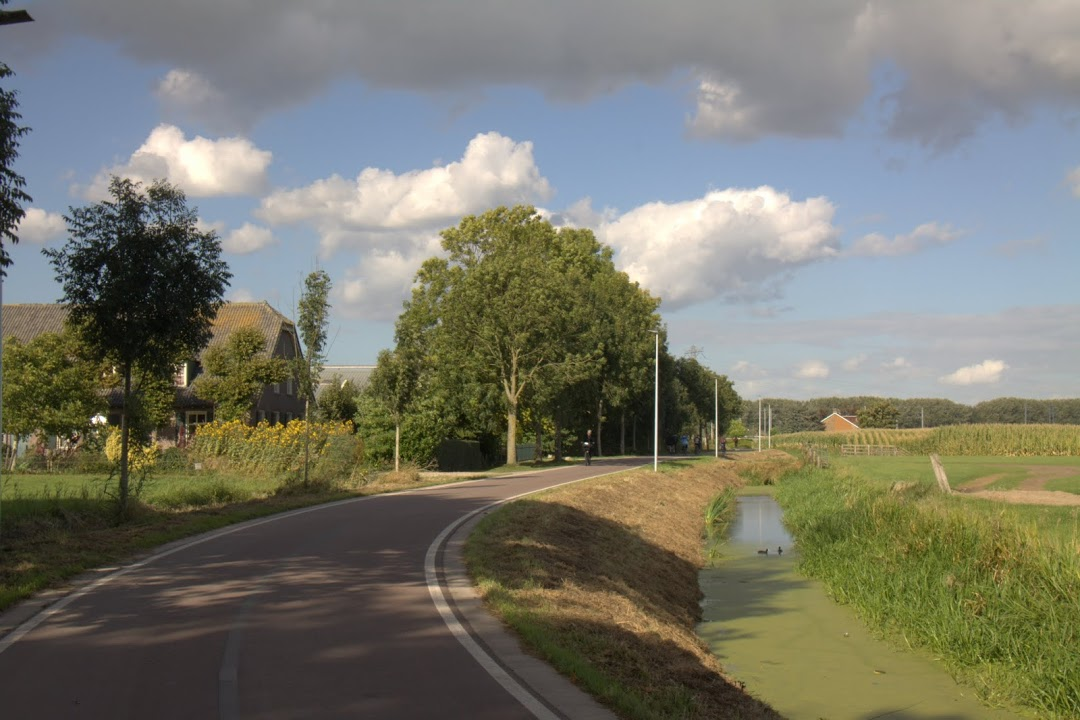
- Street view

- Location in the Netherlands Oud-Wulven (Netherlands)
- Coordinates: 52°02′40″N 5°09′18″E
- Country: Netherlands
- Province: Utrecht
- Municipality: Houten
- Time zone: UTC+1 (CET)
  - Summer (DST): UTC+2 (CEST)
- Postal code: 3992
- Dialing code: 030

Oud-Wulven is a hamlet in the Dutch province of Utrecht. It is located just north of the village of Houten, and is part of that municipality.

== History ==
Oud-Wulven was originally a heerlijkheid (fiefdom). In 1545 it was combined with the neighbouring heerlijkheid Waaijen. "Oud-Wulven en Waaijen" remained a separate entity until 1811, when it merged into Houten. This didn't last long: in 1818 they were combined with the heerlijkheden Wulven, Heemstede, Grote Koppel, Kleine Koppel, Maarschalkerweerd, and Slagmaat to a single municipality called "Oud-Wulven.

Johannes Rothe was Lord of Oud-Wulven and Wayen in the Netherlands (1658–1671). He was a prophetic preacher and Fifth Monarchist. He married in 1660 in Goring House.

The municipality Oud-Wulven had an area of about 10.7 km^{2}, and more than 250 inhabitants in the middle of the 19th century. The municipality was merged back with Houten on 8 September 1857.

It was first mentioned between 1381 and 1383 as tot Ouden Wuolven, and uses oud (old) to distinguish from Wulven. Oud-Wulven is not a statistical entity, and the postal authorities have placed it under Houten. It has no place name signs. In 1840, Oud-Wulven was home to 43 people.

== Gallery ==
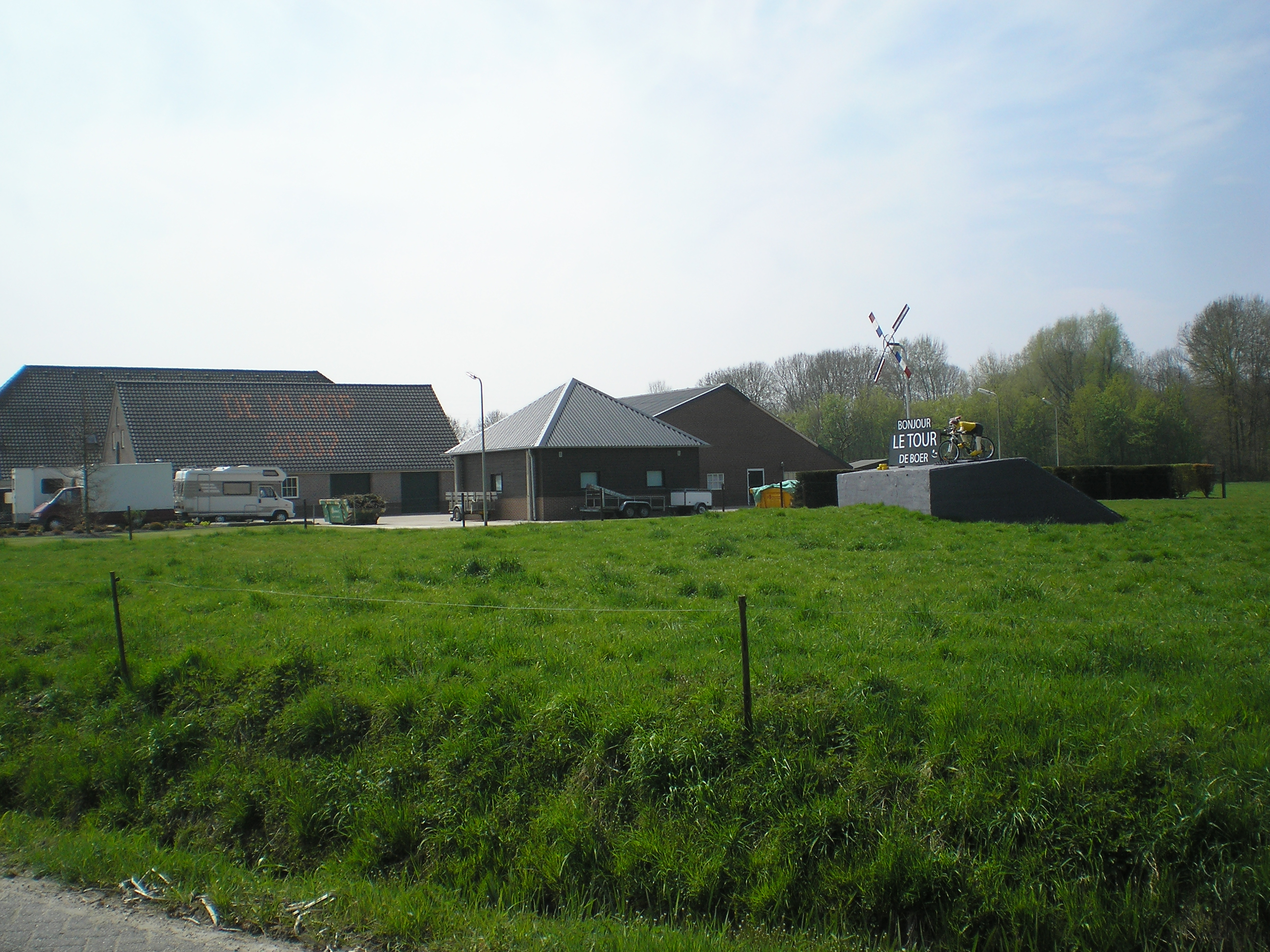
Farm De Klomp

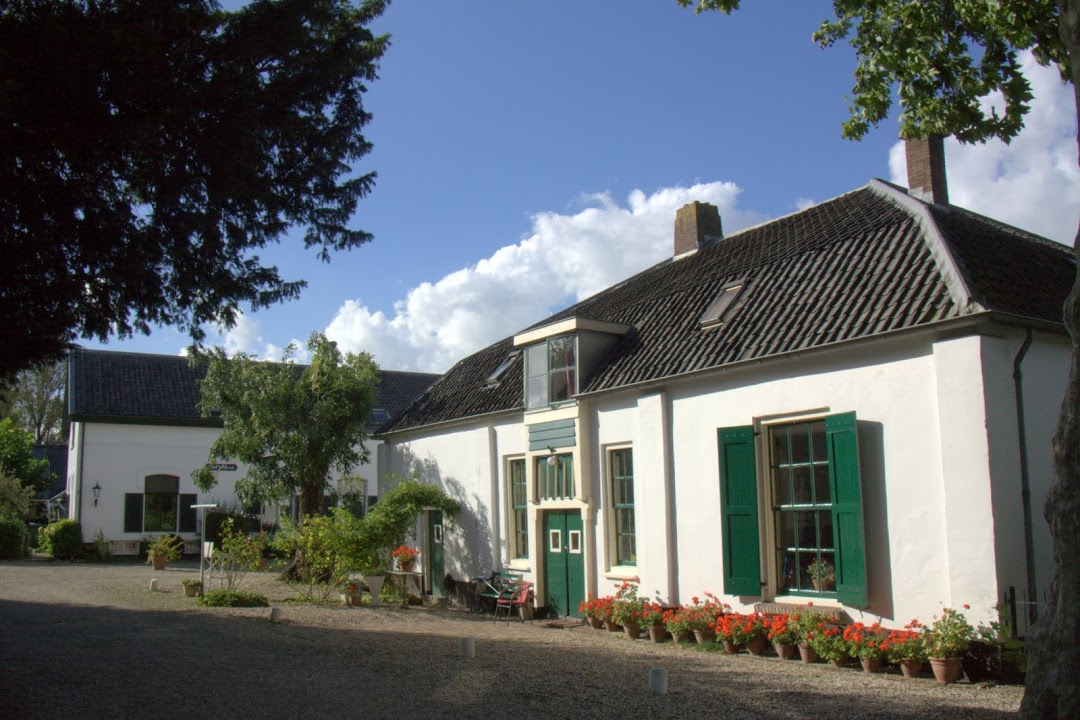
House in Oud-Wulven

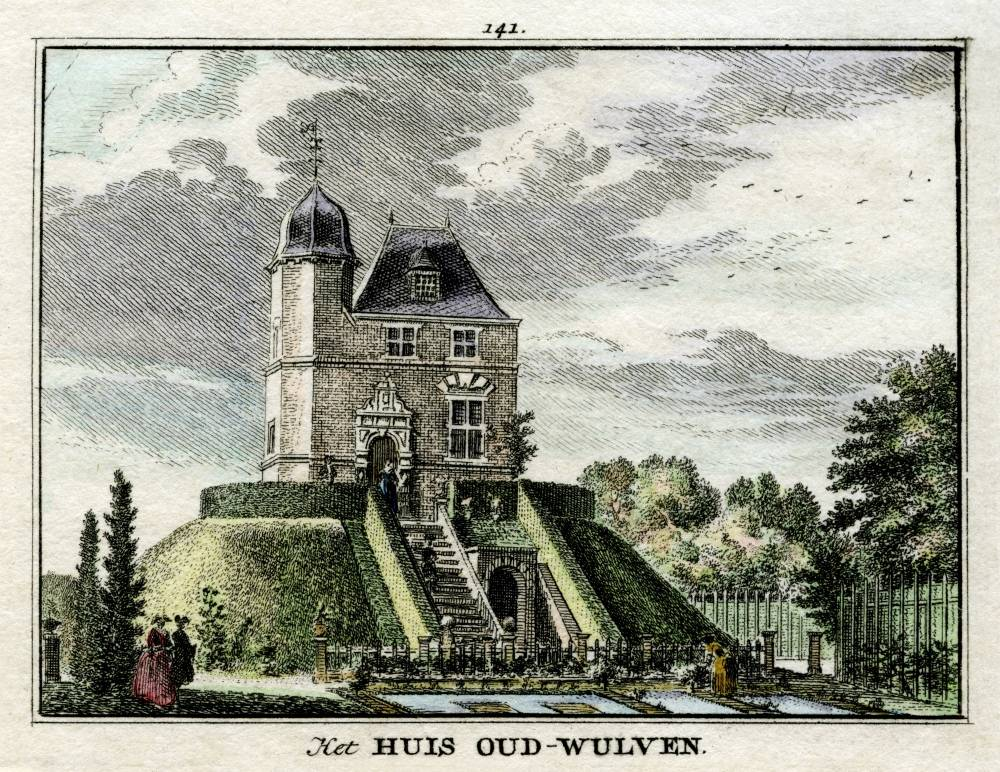
Former castle Oud-Wulven (1745-1774)

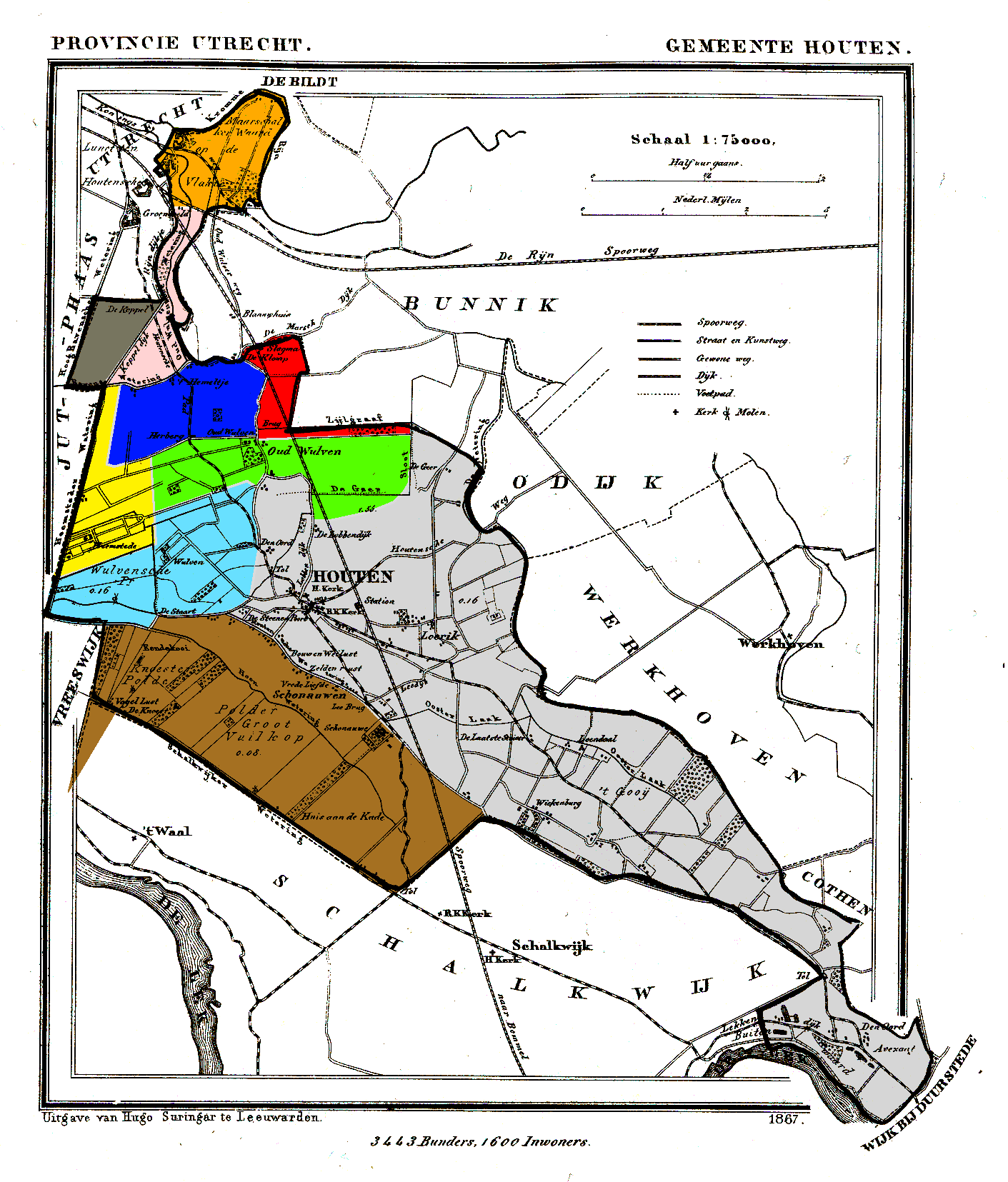
Houten in 1868. The heerlijkheden before 1795 are shown: Oud-Wulven (green), Waaijen (blue), Wulven (light blue), Heemstede (yellow), Grote and Kleine Koppel (pink and dark grey), Maarschalkerweerd (orange), and Slagmaat (red).
