= Achttienhoven, Utrecht =

Achttienhoven
- Hamlet
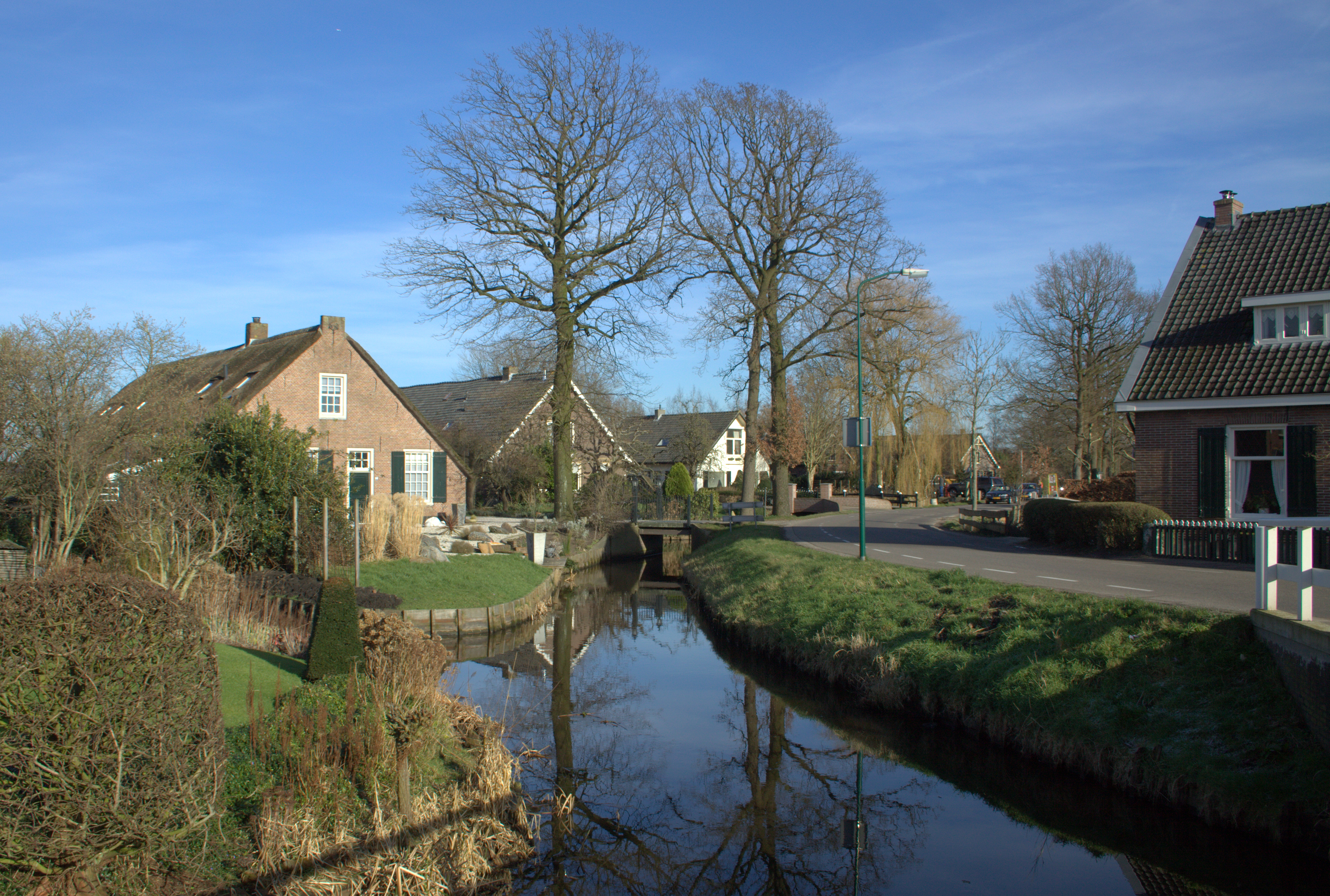

- Location in the Netherlands Achttienhoven (Netherlands)
- Coordinates: 52°8′54″N 5°8′20″E
- Country: Netherlands
- Province: Utrecht
- Municipality: De Bilt
- Time zone: UTC+1 (CET)
  - Summer (DST): UTC+2 (CEST)
- Postal code: 3615
- Dialing code: 0346

Achttienhoven is a former hamlet in the municipality of De Bilt, in the Netherlands. It is now considered to be part of the village of Westbroek.

Achttienhoven used to be a heerlijkheid (manor), until it became part of Westbroek in 1812. From 1818 to 1954, Achttienhoven was a separate municipality again. It then merged with Westbroek, which in its turn was annexed by Maartensdijk in 1957.

According to the 19th-century historian A.J. van der Aa, the village used to be called "Everckesdorp".

It was first mentioned between 1280 and 1287 as achtienhoeven, and means eighteen parcels of land. Achttienhoven is not a statistical entity, and the postal authorities have placed it under Westbroek. It has place name signs. In 1840, it was home to 236 people. Nowadays, it consists of about 120 houses.

== Gallery ==
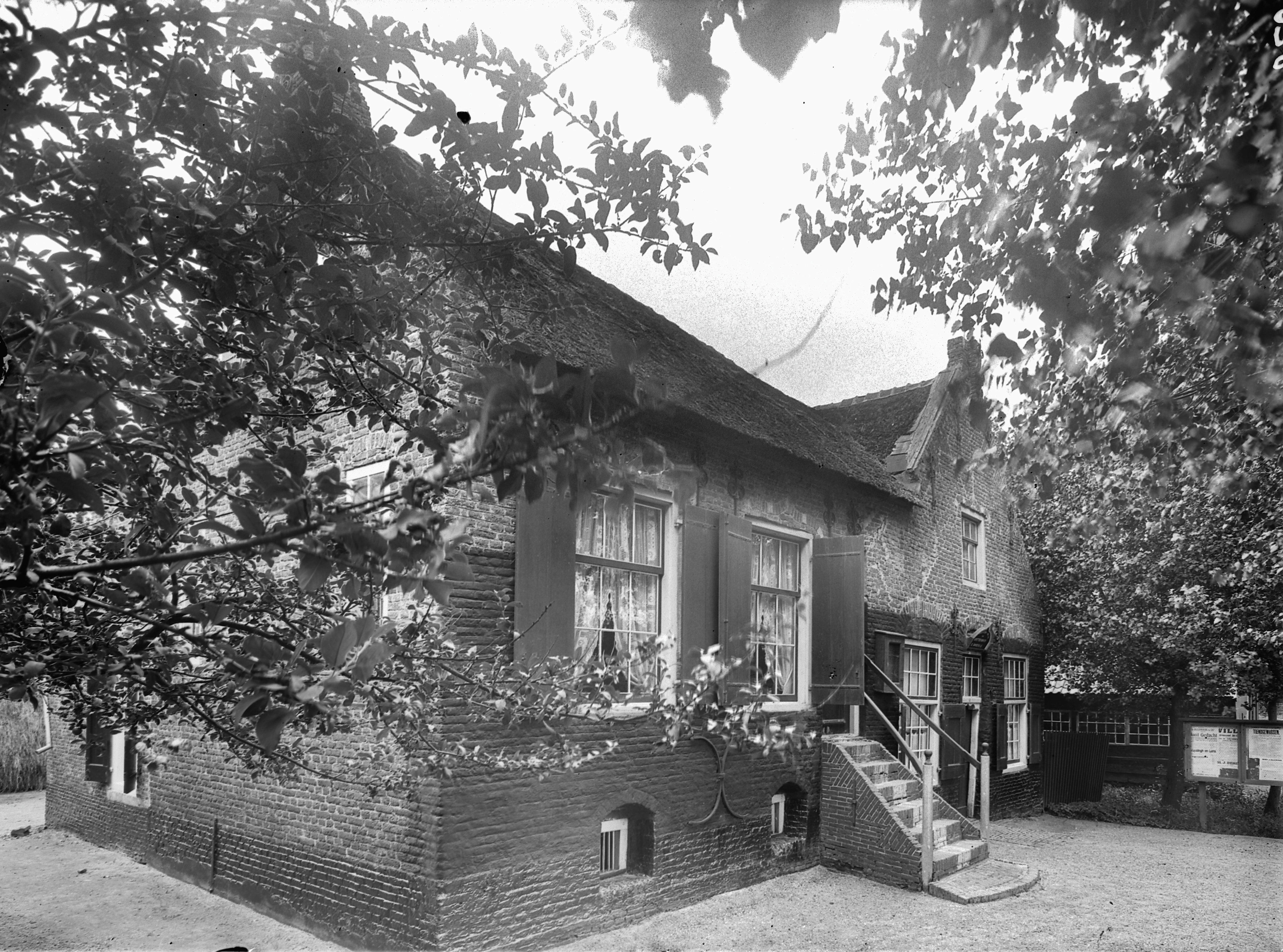
Former town hall

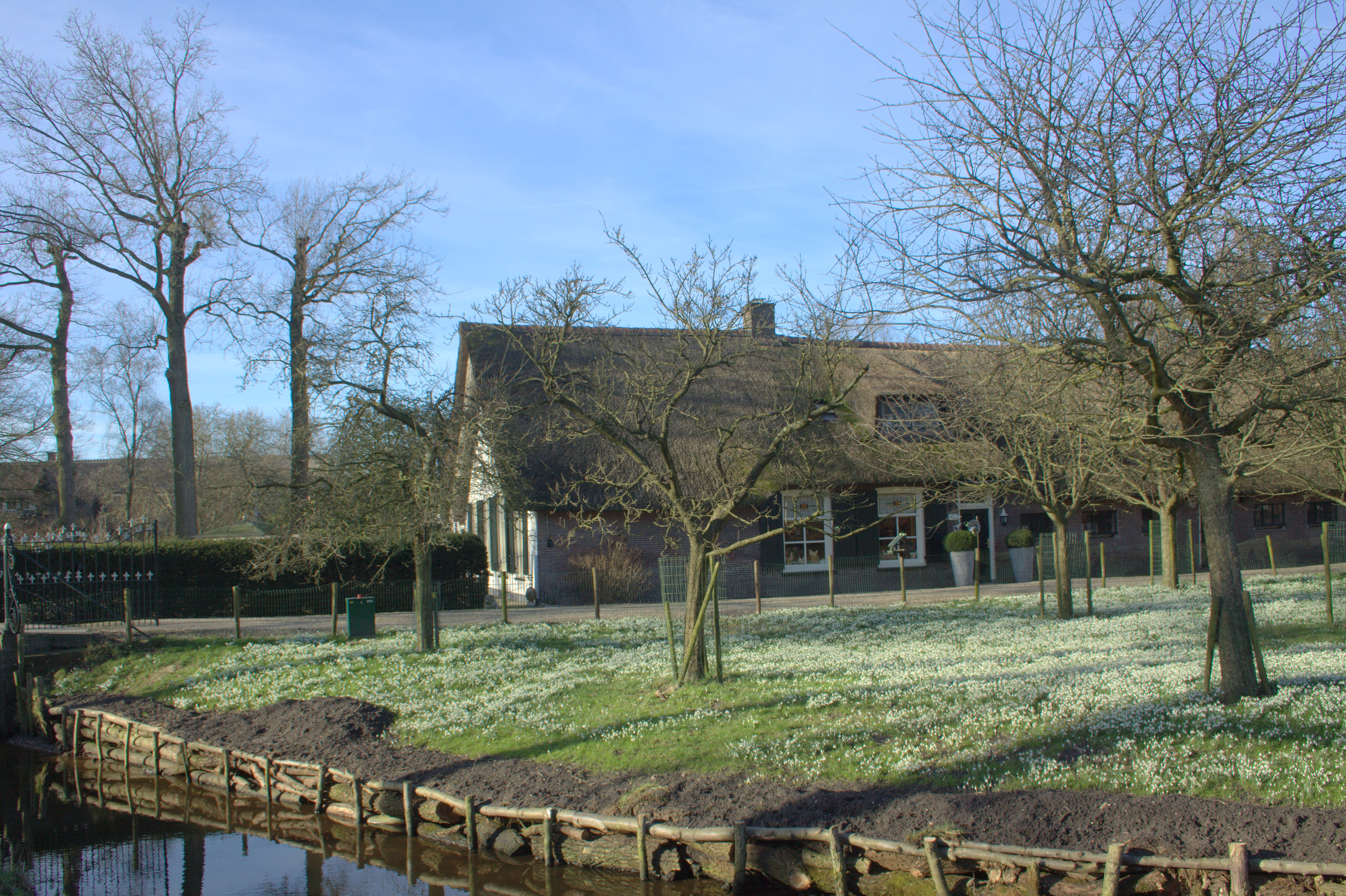
Farm in Achttienhoven
