= Oudhuizen =

Coordinates: 52°12′N 4°56′E

Oudhuizen is a former village in the Dutch province of Utrecht. It is now a neighborhood on the eastern side of the village of Wilnis.

Oudhuizen was a separate municipality from 1818 to 1857, when it was merged with Wilnis.
