= Sterkenburg =

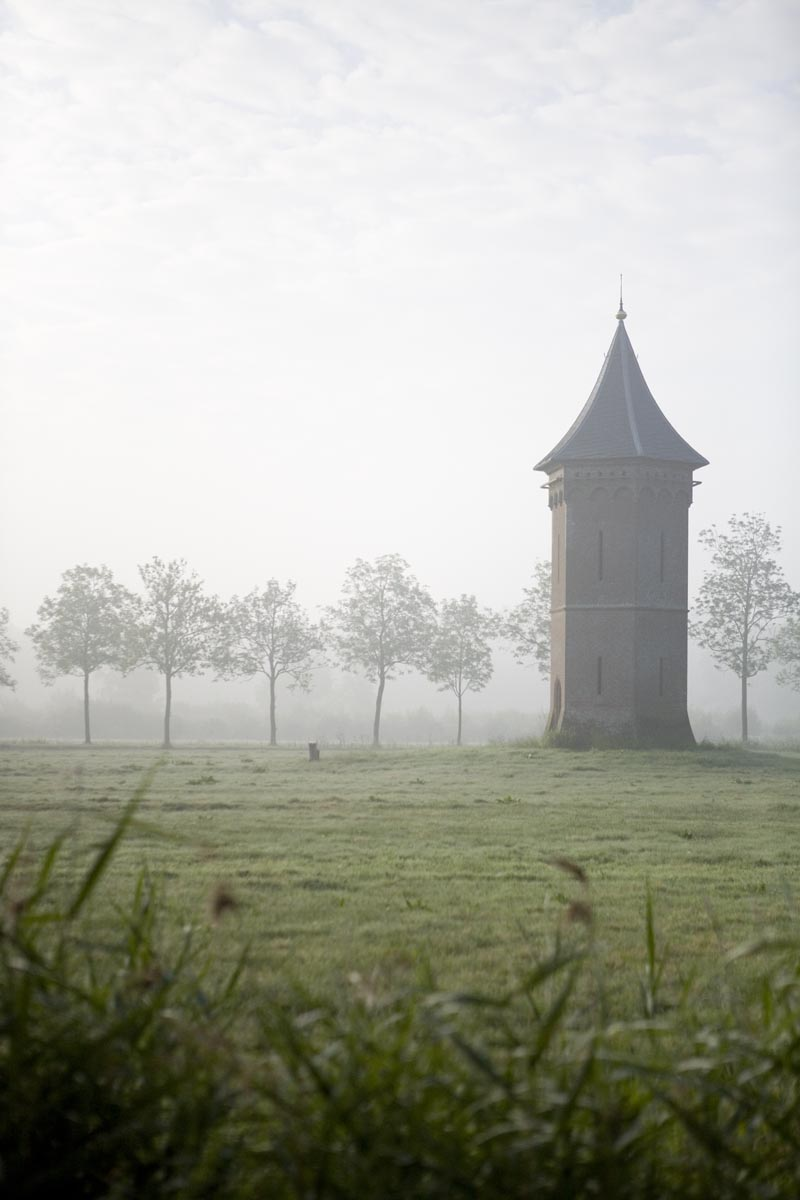
- Castle Sterkenburg dovecote

- Coat of arms
- Interactive map of Sterkenburg
- Coordinates: 52°01′24″N 5°17′01″E
- Country: Netherlands
- Province: Utrecht
- Municipality: Utrechtse Heuvelrug

Area
  - Total: 24 km^{2} (9.3 sq mi)

Population
  - Total: 637
  - Density: 27/km^{2} (69/sq mi)

Sterkenburg is a hamlet and former municipality in the Dutch province of Utrecht. It existed between 1818 and 1857, when it was merged with Driebergen.

The Castle Sterkenburg is located here, about 3 km south of Driebergen. The literal translation of the name is "strong castle".

There is also a Dutch surname "Sterkenburg", which is derived from this location.
