= Hoenkoop =

- Village
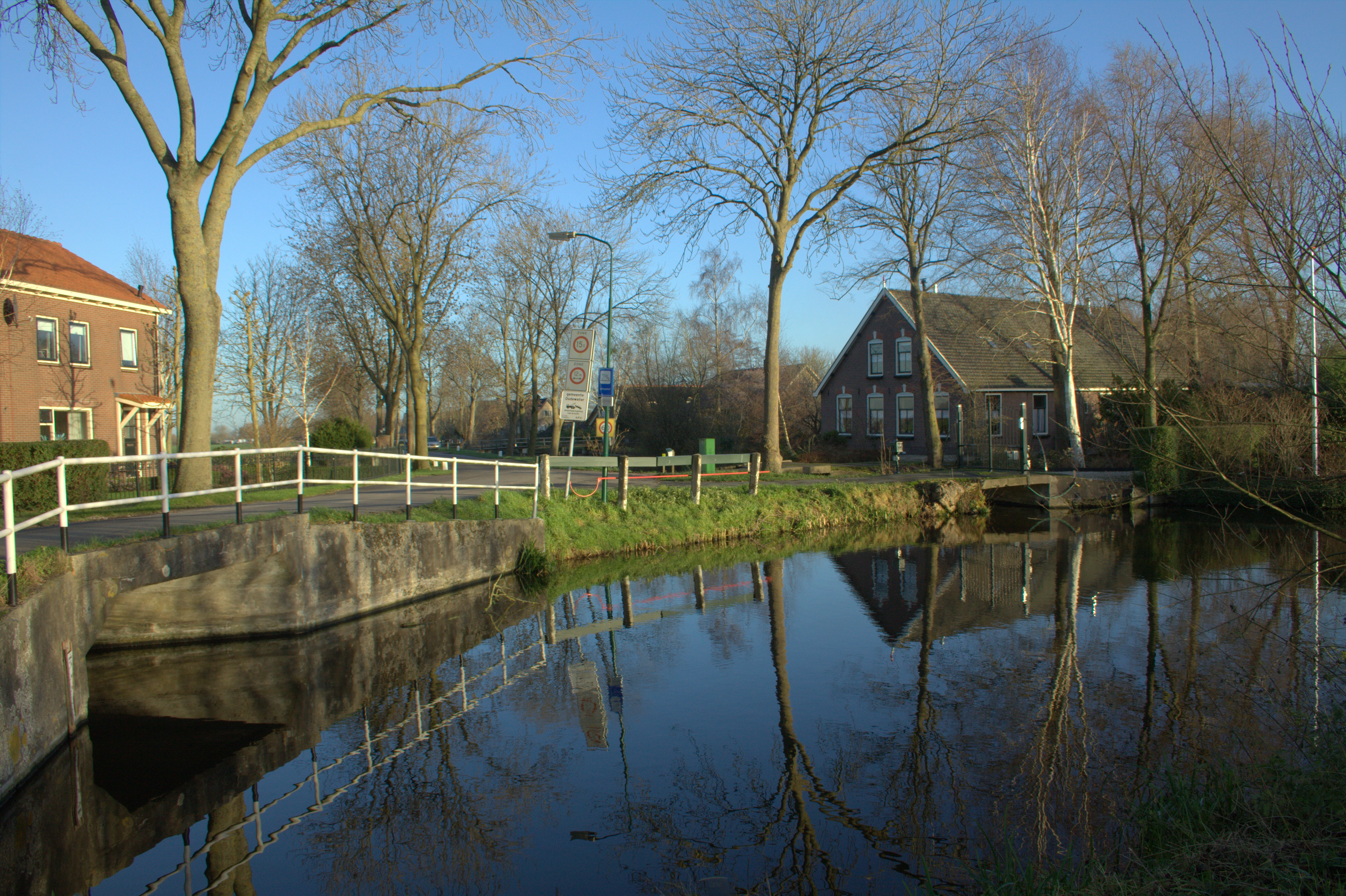
- Street view

- Location in the Netherlands Hoenkoop (Netherlands)
- Coordinates: 52.00349°N 4.84747°E
- Country: Netherlands
- Province: Utrecht
- Municipality: Oudewater

Area
  - Total: 0.09 km^{2} (0.035 sq mi)

Population (2021)
  - Total: 455
  - Density: 5,100/km^{2} (13,000/sq mi)
- Time zone: UTC+1 (CET)
  - Summer (DST): UTC+2 (CEST)
- Postal code: 3421
- Dialing code: 0348

Hoenkoop is a hamlet in the Dutch province of Utrecht.

Since 1970, Hoenkoop has been a part of the municipality of Oudewater. Between 1815 and 1970, it was a separate municipality.

The hamlet was first mentioned in 1299 or 1300 Hoencoop, and means "(peat) concession", however the name first name Hoen does not fit. Hoenkoop has not place name signs. In 1840, it was home to 324 people.

== Gallery ==
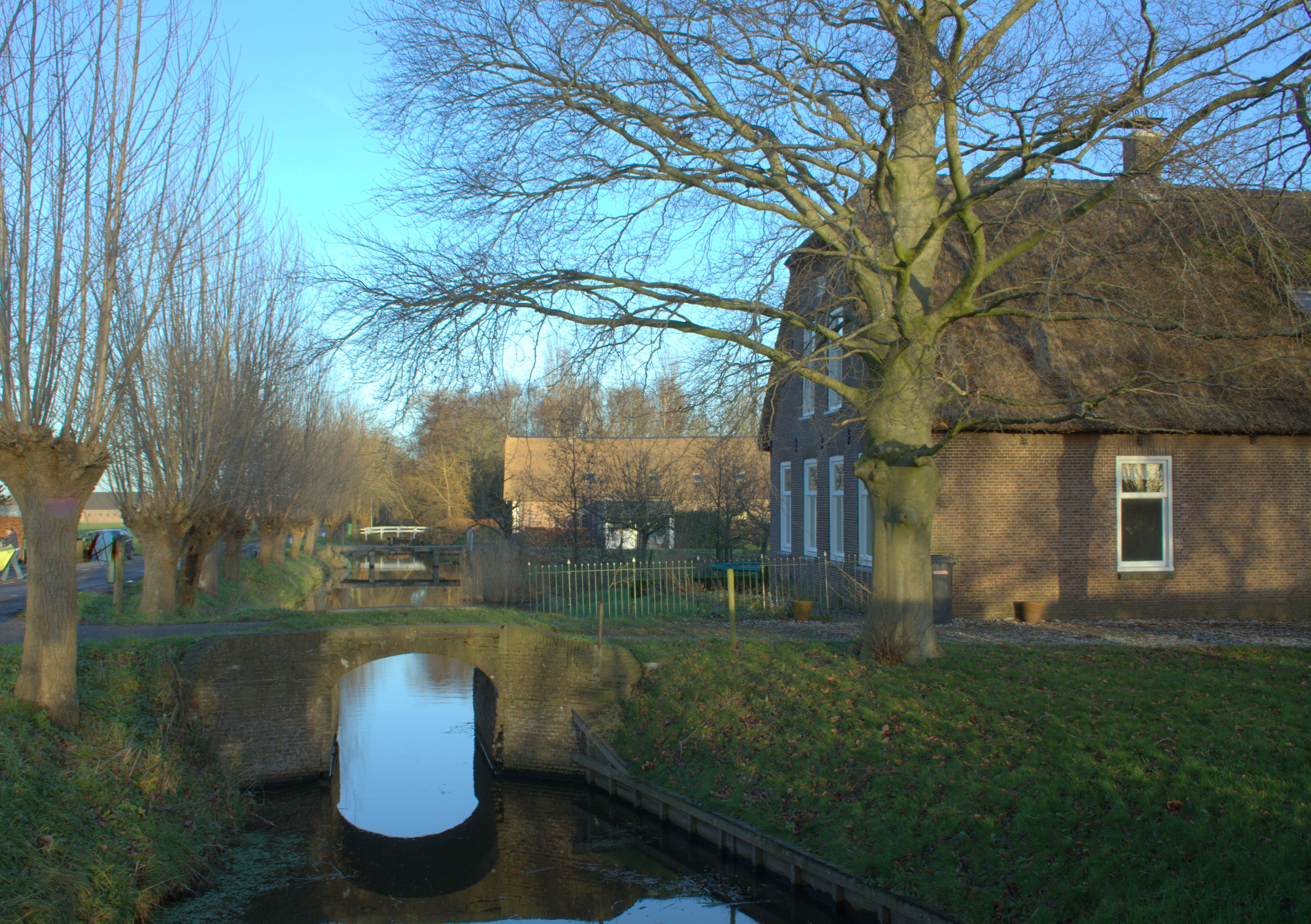
Farms in Hoenkoop

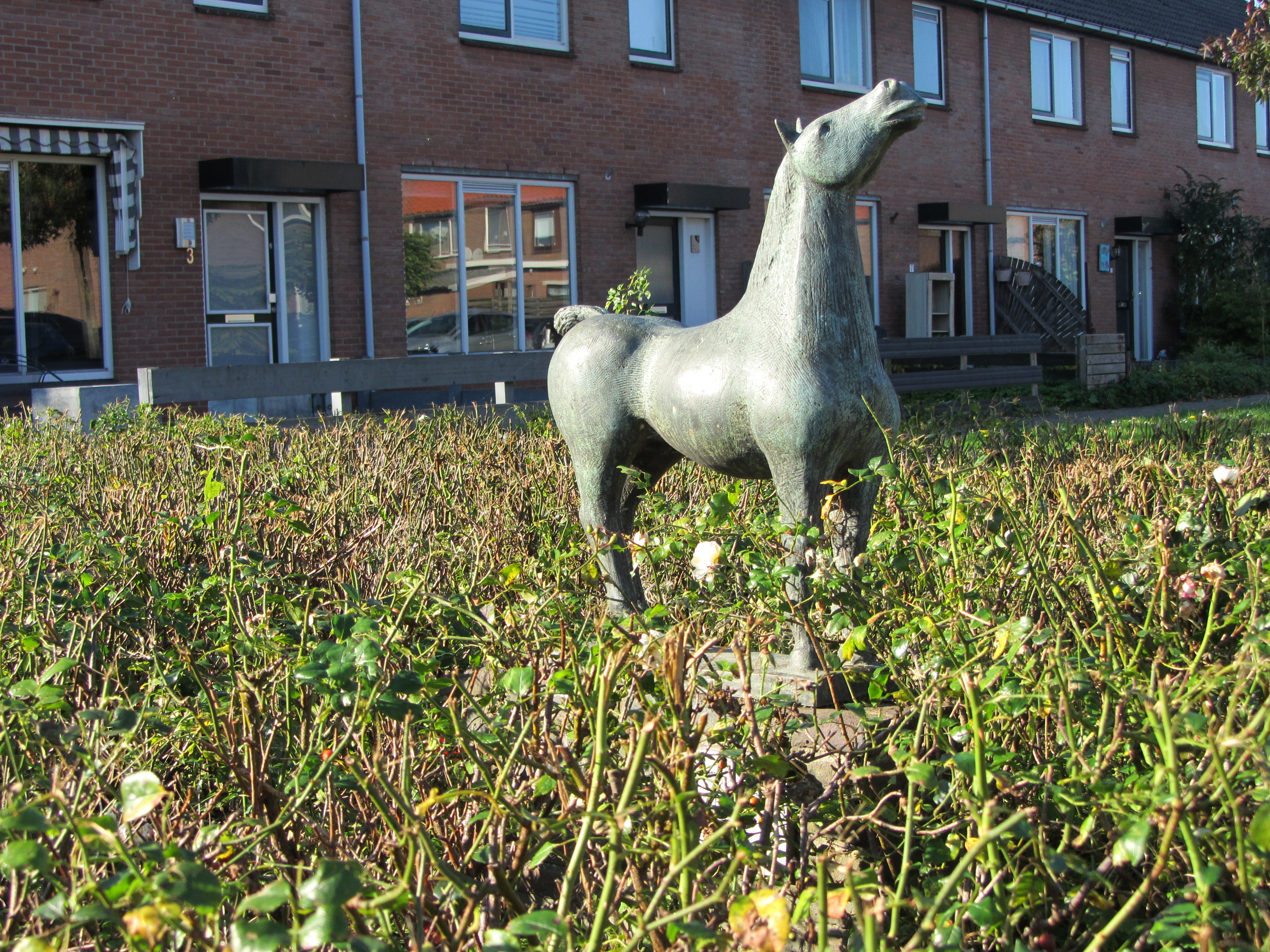
Horse statue by Piet van Heerden

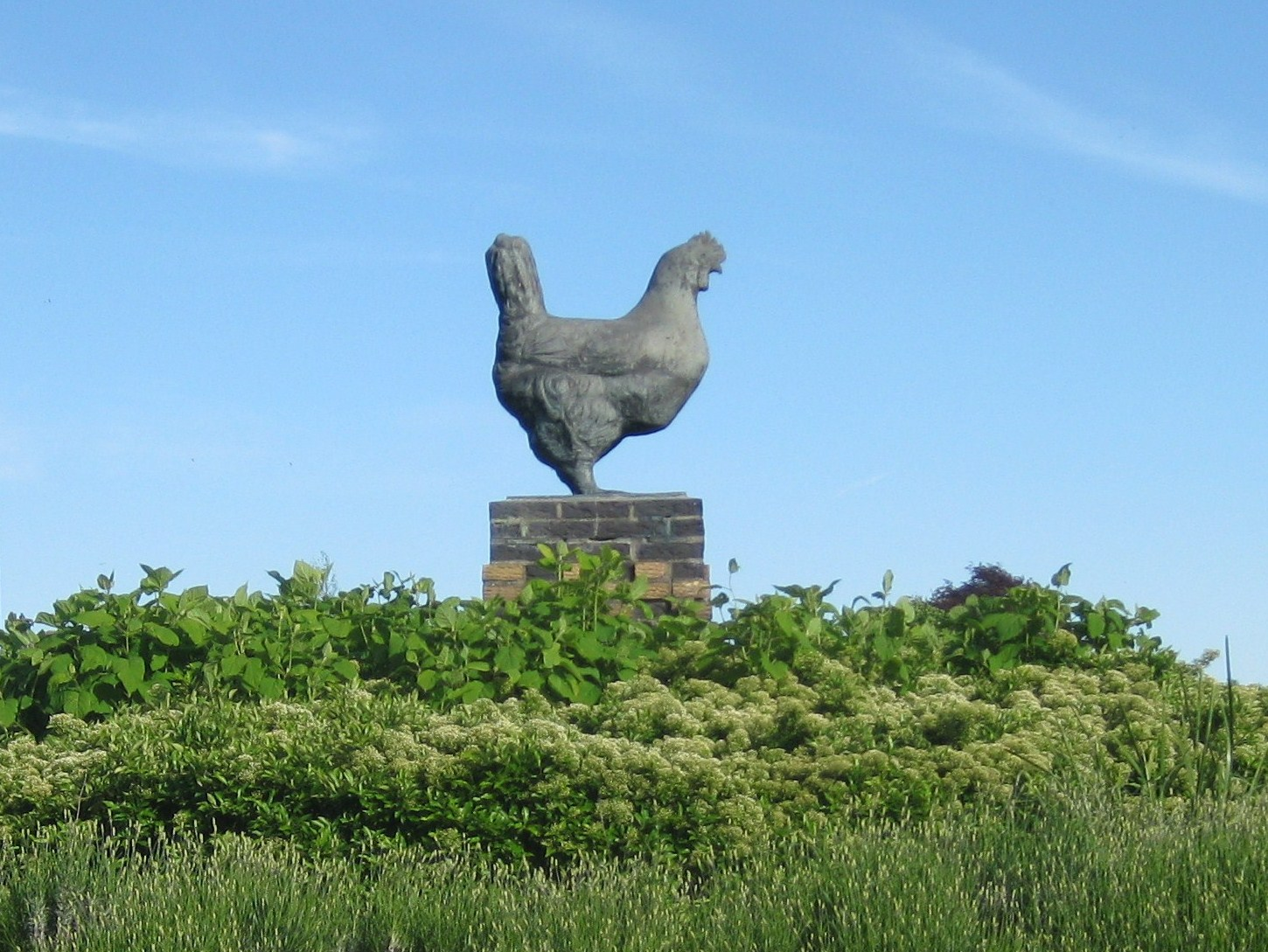
Chicken statue
