= Schonauwen =

Coordinates: 52°01′N 5°11′E

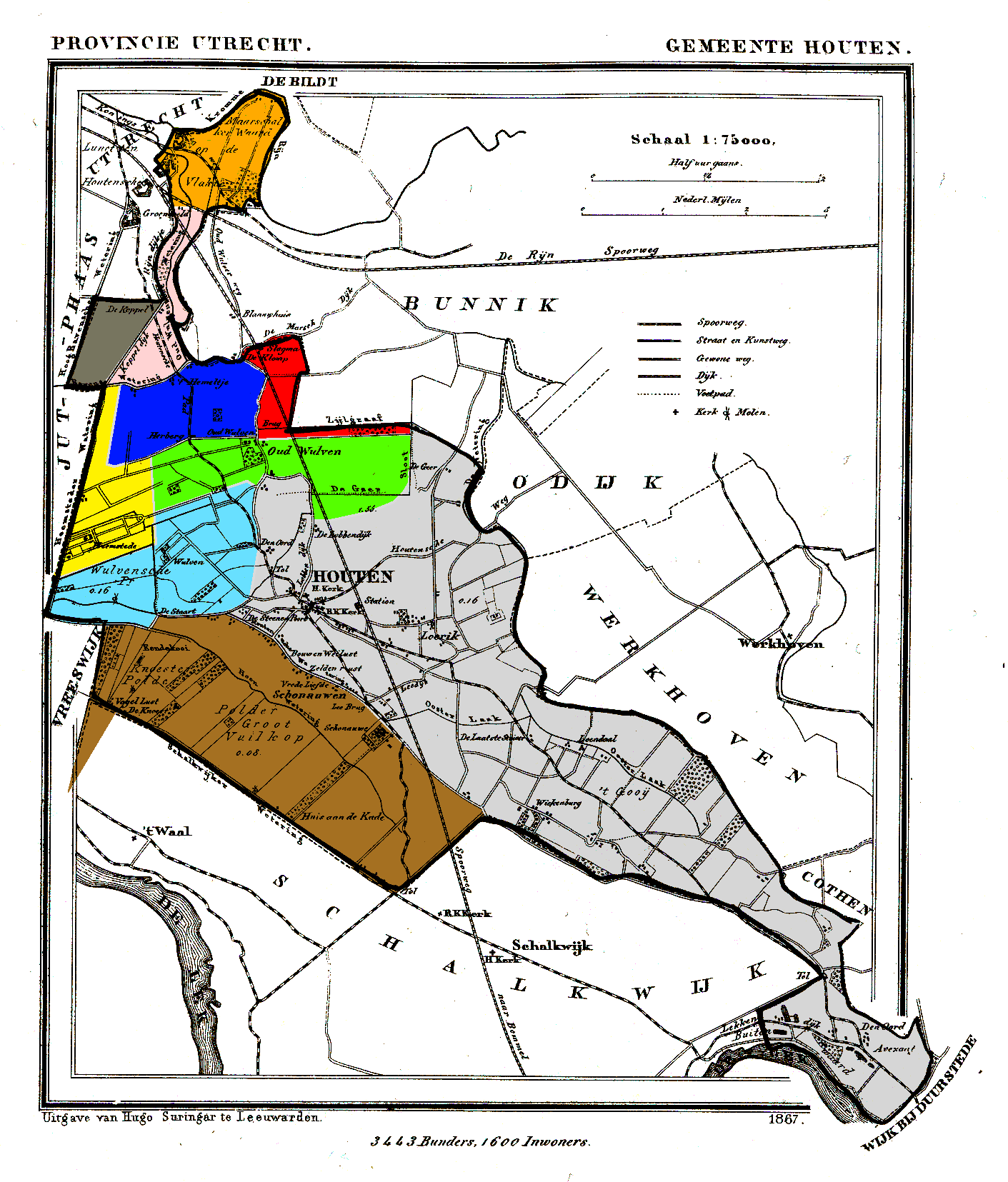
Municipality of Houten in 1868, with Schonauwen coloured brown.

Schonauwen is a former castle in the Dutch province of Utrecht. It is located on the southern outskirts of the town of Houten, surrounded by new buildings.

Until the end of the 18th century, Schonauwen was a separate heerlijkheid (fiefdom). When the country was divided into municipalities by the French, Schonauwen was added to the municipality of Houten, but it became a separate municipality in 1818. In 1857 it was merged back into Houten.

The heerlijkheid and municipality covered an area of about 6.8 km^{2}, and had about 240 inhabitants in the middle of the 19th century.

== Castle Schonauwen ==
The castle is now owned by the family Schmidt.
