= Maarschalkerweerd =

Maarschalkerweerd may refer to:

- Romée Maarschalkerweerd (born 2004), Dutch handball player
- Sportpark Maarschalkerweerd – Dutch cricket ground
