= Duist =

Coordinates: 52.2170°N 5.3836°E

Duist is a former municipality in the Dutch province of Utrecht, located between Amersfoort and Bunschoten. The municipality existed between 1818 and 1857, when it was merged with the municipality of Hoogland. When Hoogland was annexed by Amersfoort in 1974, the Duist area was split off, and merged with the municipality of Bunschoten.

The municipality of Duist contained the village of Zevenhuizen and the polder De Haar.
