= Willige Langerak =

- Hamlet
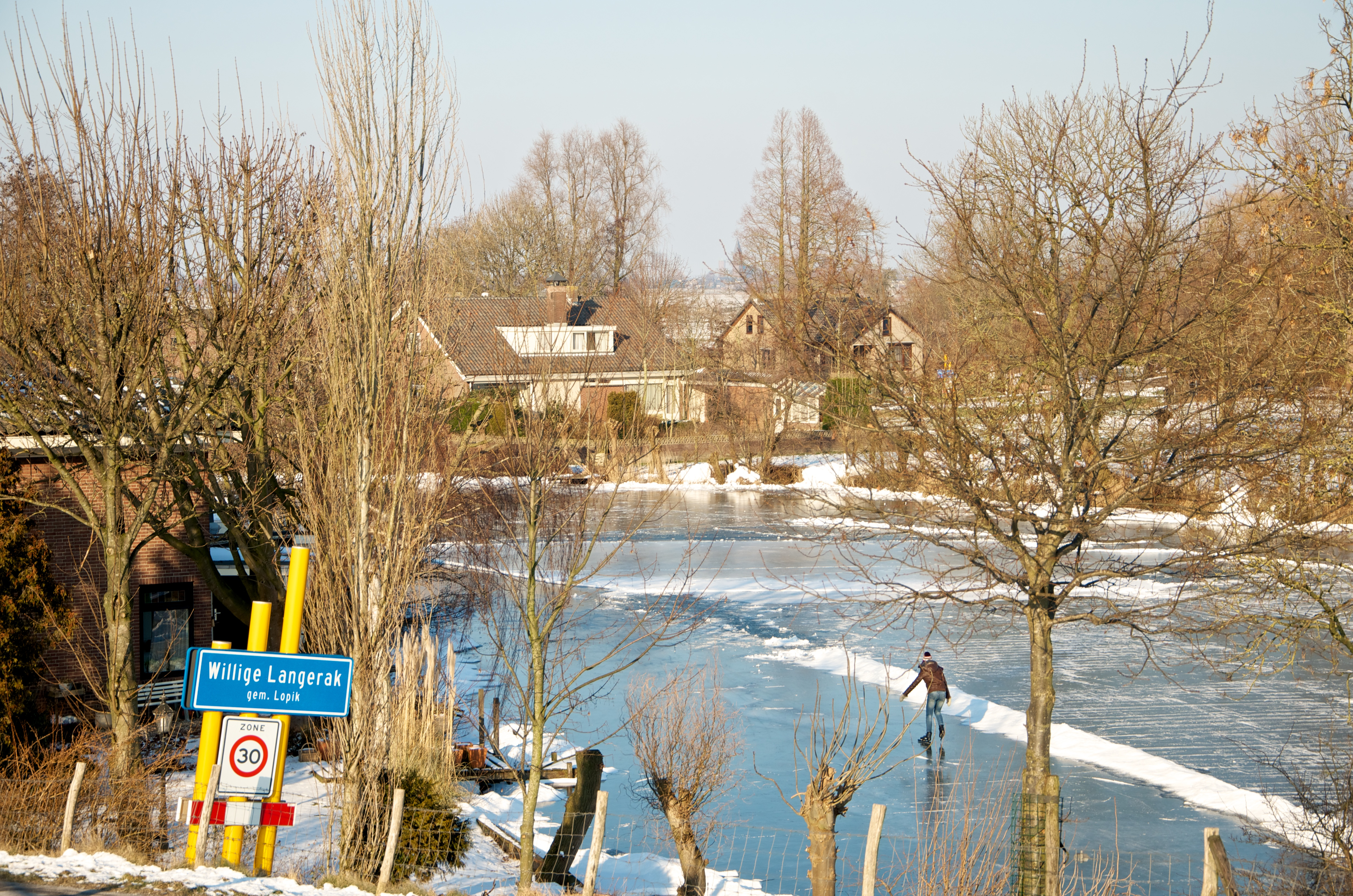
- The ice rink of Willige Langerak

- Location in the Netherlands Willige Langerak (Netherlands)
- Coordinates: 51°56′31″N 4°53′1″E
- Country: Netherlands
- Province: Utrecht
- Municipality: Lopik
- Time zone: UTC+1 (CET)
  - Summer (DST): UTC+2 (CEST)
- Postal code: 3411
- Dialing code: 0348

Willige Langerak is a hamlet in the Dutch provinces of South Holland and Utrecht. It is located in the municipalities of Krimpenerwaard and Lopik, just east of Schoonhoven.

Willige Langerak was a separate municipality in the province of Utrecht between 1818 and 1943, when its largest portion was merged with Lopik in the province of Utrecht and a smaller portion (the church and its surroundings) was added to Schoonhoven in South Holland.

It was first mentioned in 1291 as Wilgerkerke, and means willow trees near Langerak. Willige Langerak is not a statistical entity, and the postal authorities have placed it under Lopik. Most of the old village has been annexed by Schoonhoven, and the part in Lopik remains. Willige Langerak has its own place name signs. In 1840, it was home to 437 people. The hamlet in Lopik consists of about 120 houses.

== Gallery ==
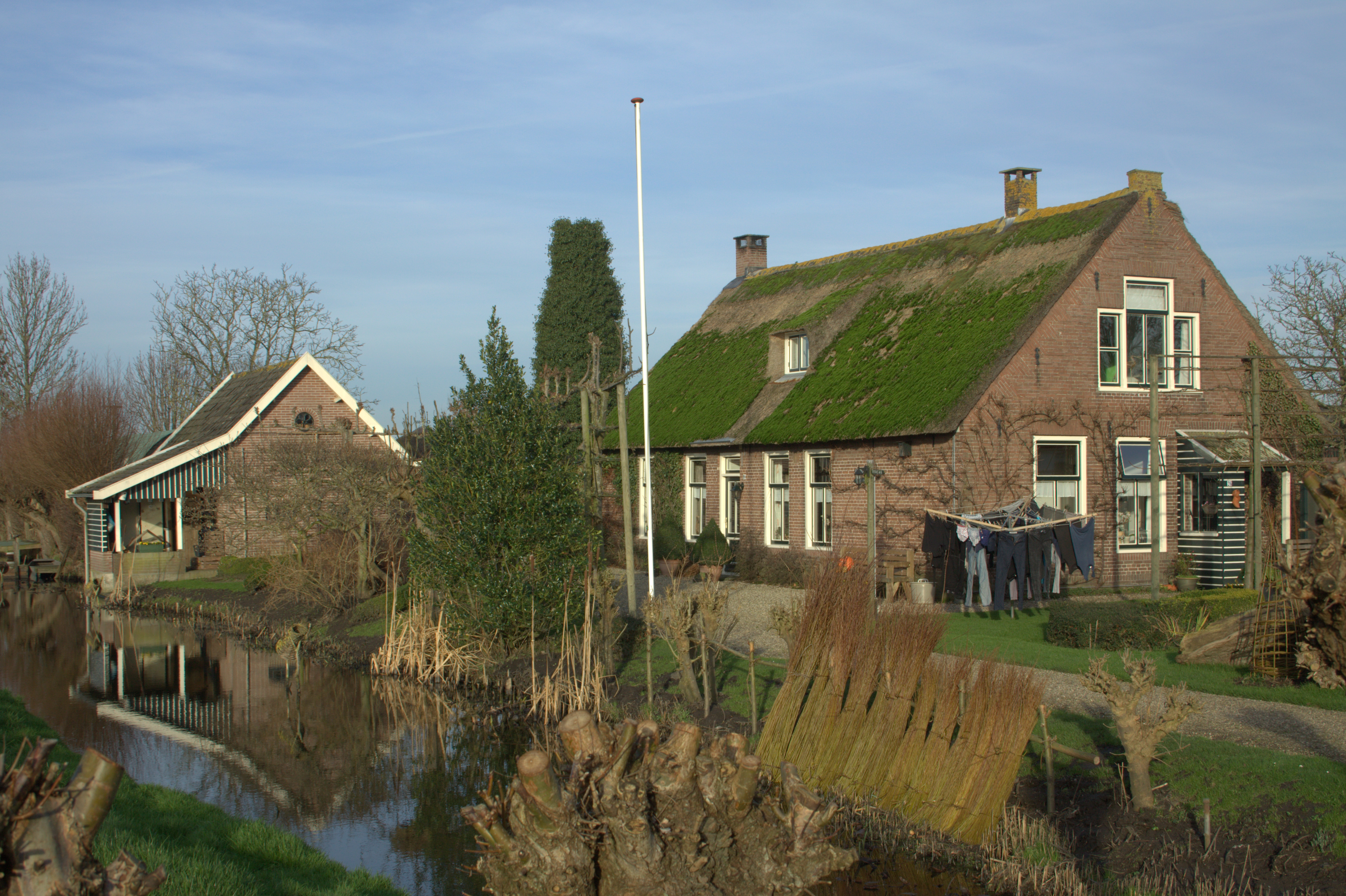
Farm the Wielewaal

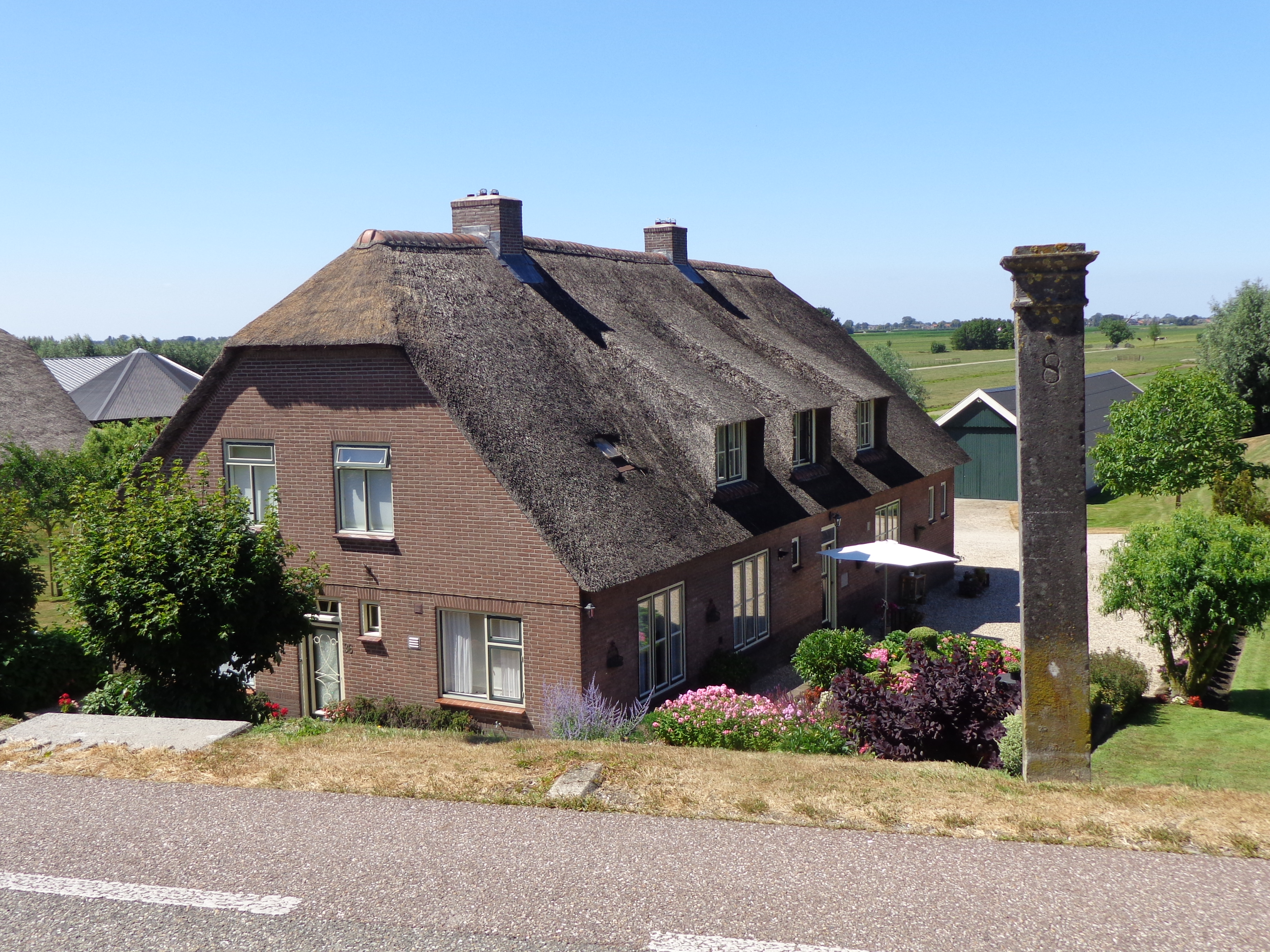
Farm in Willige Langerak

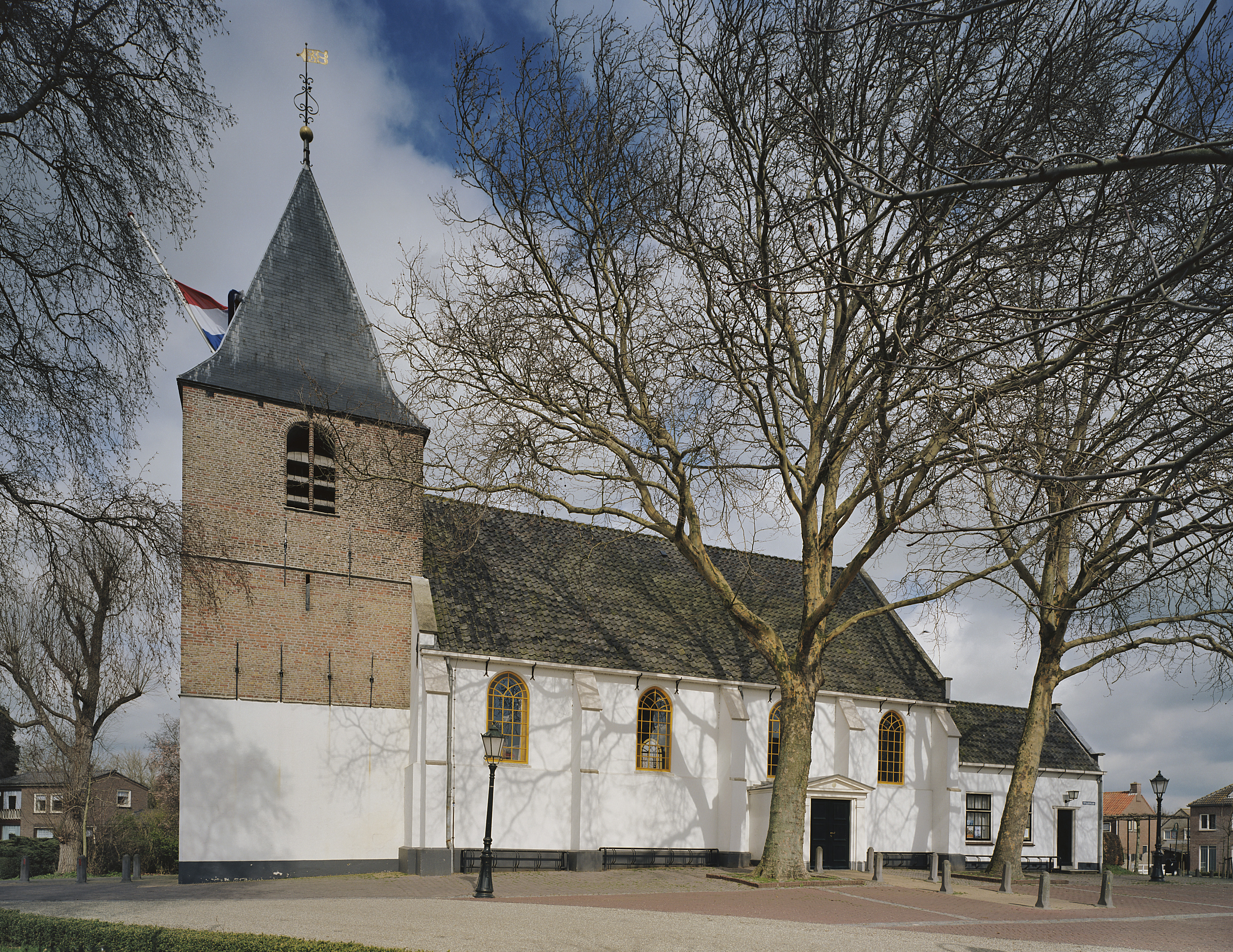
Former church of Willige Langerak. Now in Schoonhoven

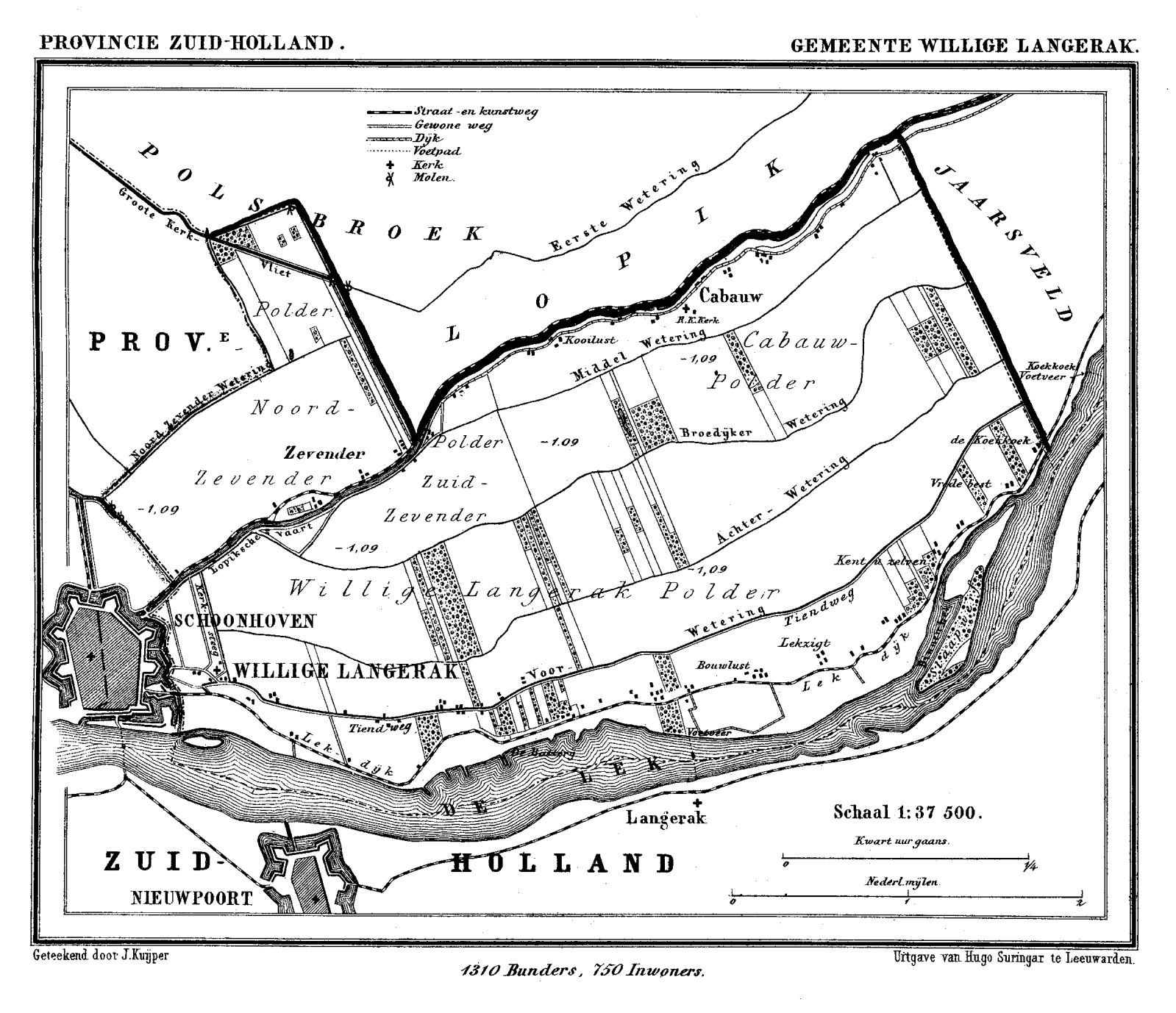
Willige Langerak in 1865.
