= Ruwiel =

Coordinates: 52°011′N 4°059′E

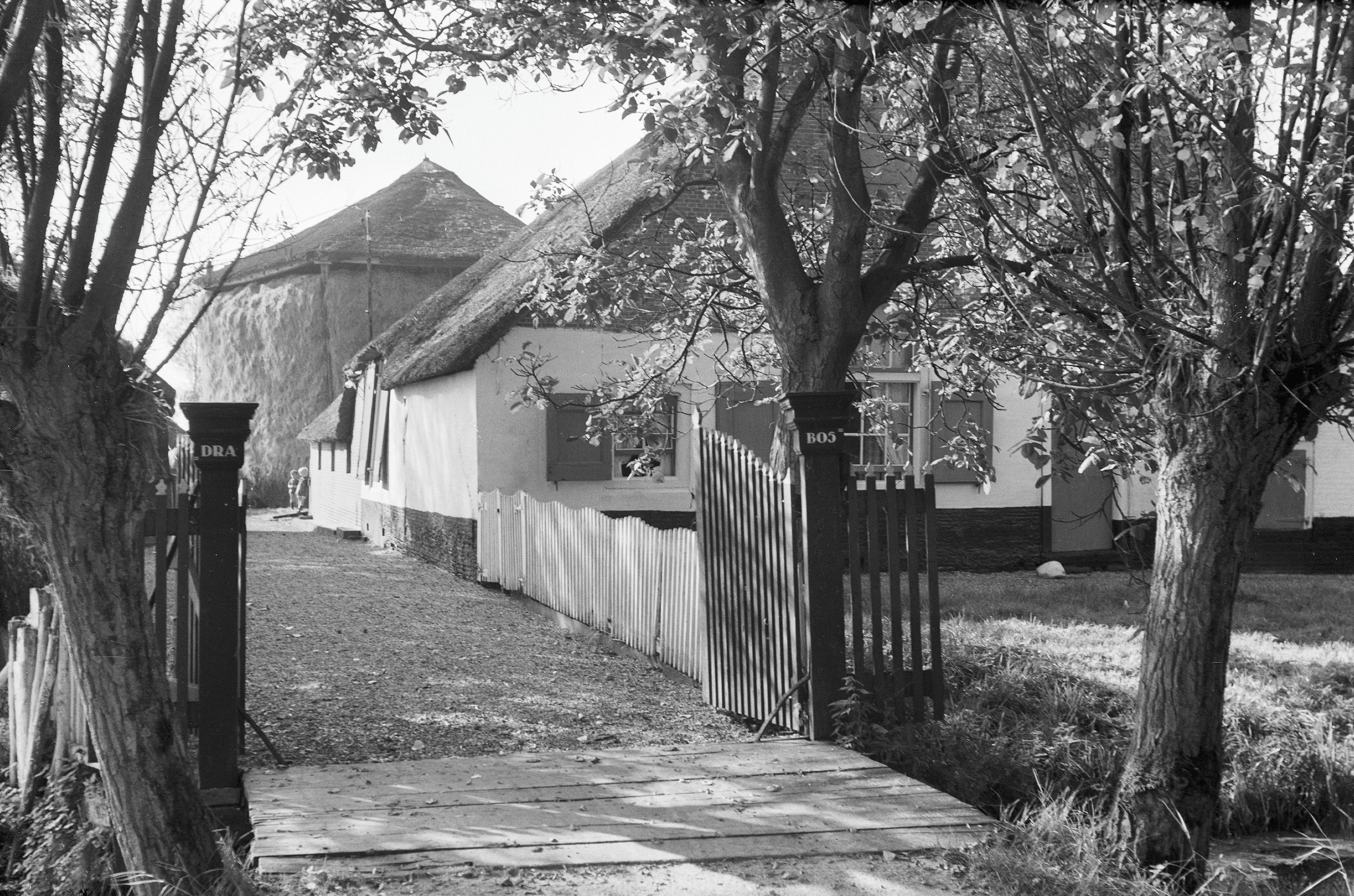
Ruwiel

Ruwiel is a former municipality in the Dutch province of Utrecht. It existed from 1818 to 1964, when it was merged with Breukelen.
