= Abcoude-Proostdij =

Coordinates: 52°16′15″N 4°58′50″E

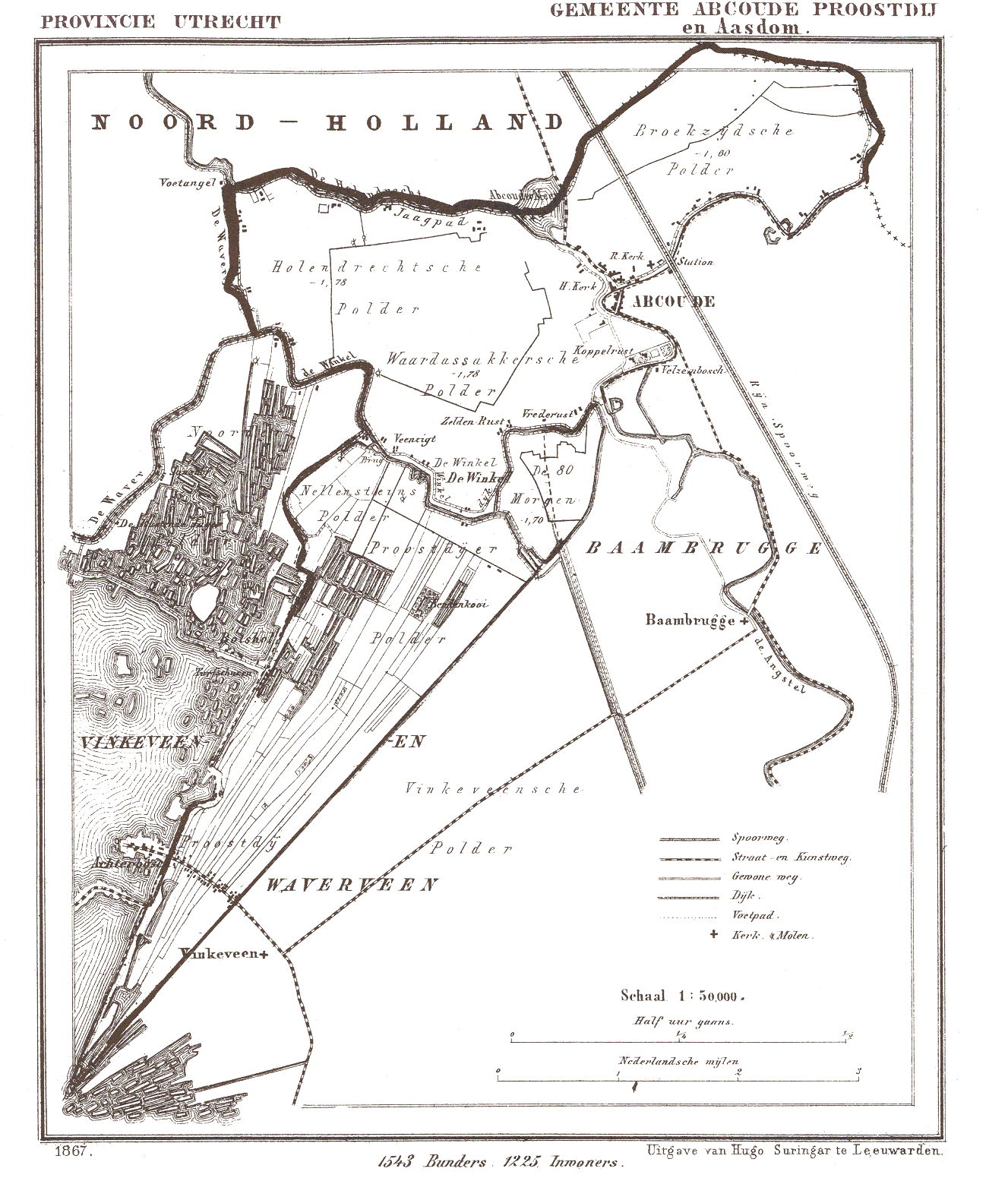
Map of Abcoude in the late 1800s

Abcoude-Proostdij (sometimes called "Abcoude-Proosdij" or "Abcoude-Proostdij en Aasdom") is a former municipality in the Dutch province of Utrecht. Abcoude-Proostdij covered the northern part of the current municipality of Abcoude, including the village of Abcoude itself.

Abcoude-Proostdij was a heerlijkheid (manor) owned by the chapter of the St. Pieter in Utrecht. When the current municipal system was introduced in the Netherlands in 1812, it became a municipality under the name "Abcoude", but it was changed to "Abcoude-Proostdij" in 1815. In 1941, the municipalities of Abcoude-Proostdij and Abcoude-Baambrugge merged, to form the present municipality of Abcoude.
