= Rhijnauwen =

Coordinates: 52°04′08″N 5°10′39″E

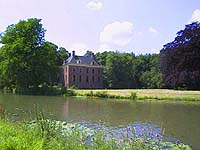
Castle Rhijnauwen seen from the Kromme Rijn.

Rhijnauwen is a castle, former heerlijkheid (fiefdom), and former municipality in the Dutch province of Utrecht. It was located northwest of the village of Bunnik.

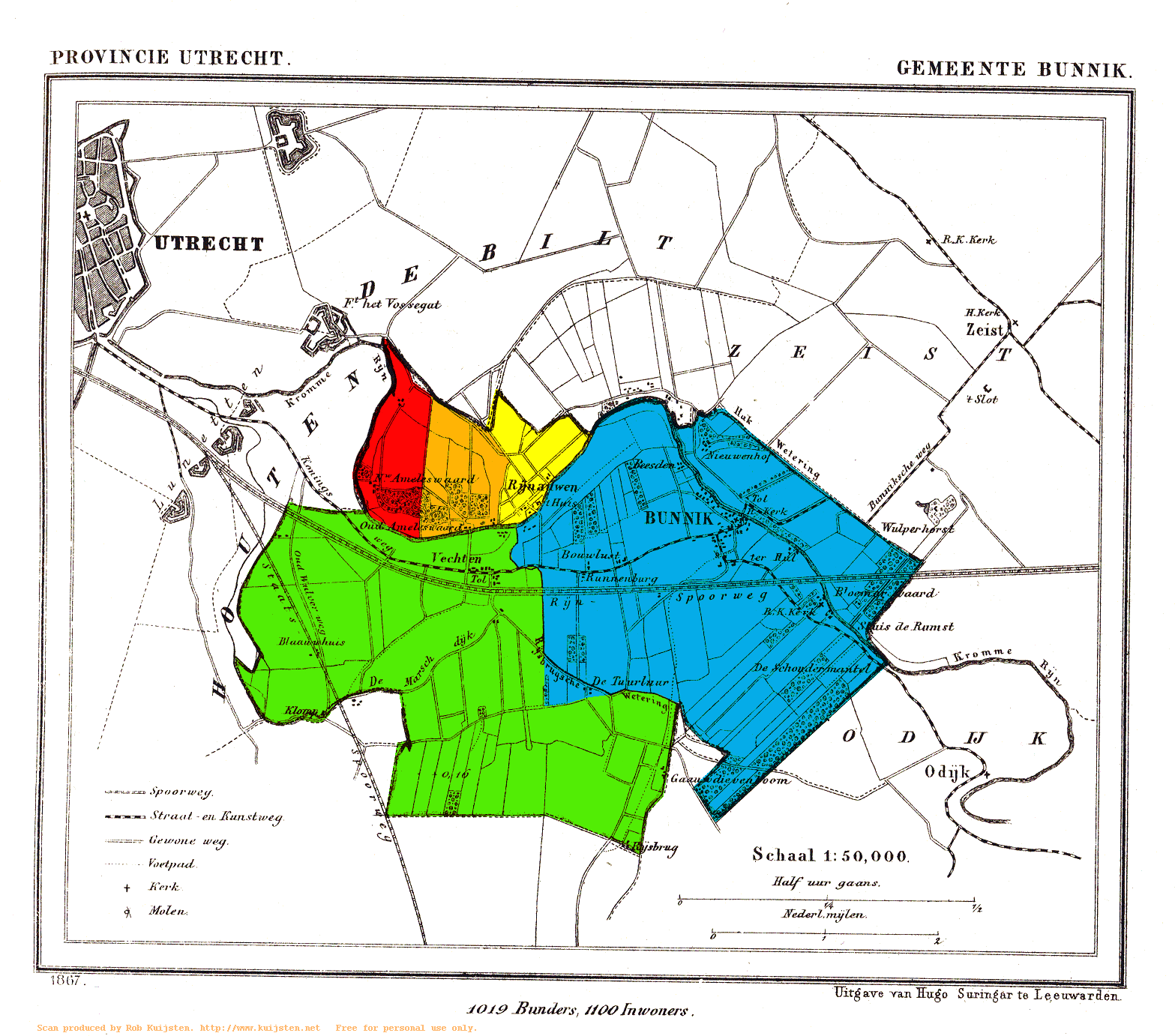
The municipality of Rhijnauwen consisted of Nieuw- and Oud-Amelisweerd (red and orange), and the original heerlijkheid Rhijnauwen (yellow). Shown here on a map of the municipality Bunnik in 1868.

The municipality existed from 1818 to 1857, when it was merged with Bunnik. It consisted of the former heerlijkheden Amelisweerd and Rhijnauwen. Around 1850, it had 50 inhabitants.

The name is still used to denote the small forest that separates Bunnik and Utrecht.

The name is probably derived from Rhijnauwen Auen, an old word for the wet meadows along the Rhine. The estate is probably from the 13th century. The first mention of the manor Rhijnauwen dates back to 1212. The House was in the first half of the 14th century it belonged to the genus of Lichtenberg. This family was one of the most powerful families of Utrecht and had also Lichtenberg House, which was located in a place now part of the town hall in Utrecht. Rhijnauwen was officially recognized in 1536 as a manor. After the marriage of John IV of Lichtenberg Aleid Renesse came from the farmhouse in the hands of the family Van Zeeland Renesse. In 1449, the brothers Frederick and John Renesse Rudolf after the victory of Deep Holt Zweder banned from Culemborg, and in 1450 the house was on fire Rhijnauwen commissioned by the city of Utrecht. After the house has exchanged owners several times. The last private owner of the house was the family Rhijnauwen Strick van Linschoten Rhijnauwen bought in 1773. In 1919 the estate was bought by the city of Utrecht. The then owner, the Dowager Strick van Linschoten should stay there until the end of her life. On April 1, 1933 was leased to the hostel Rhijnauwen Foundation, which gave the building its current destination.
