= Heemstede, Utrecht =

Heemstede
- Hamlet
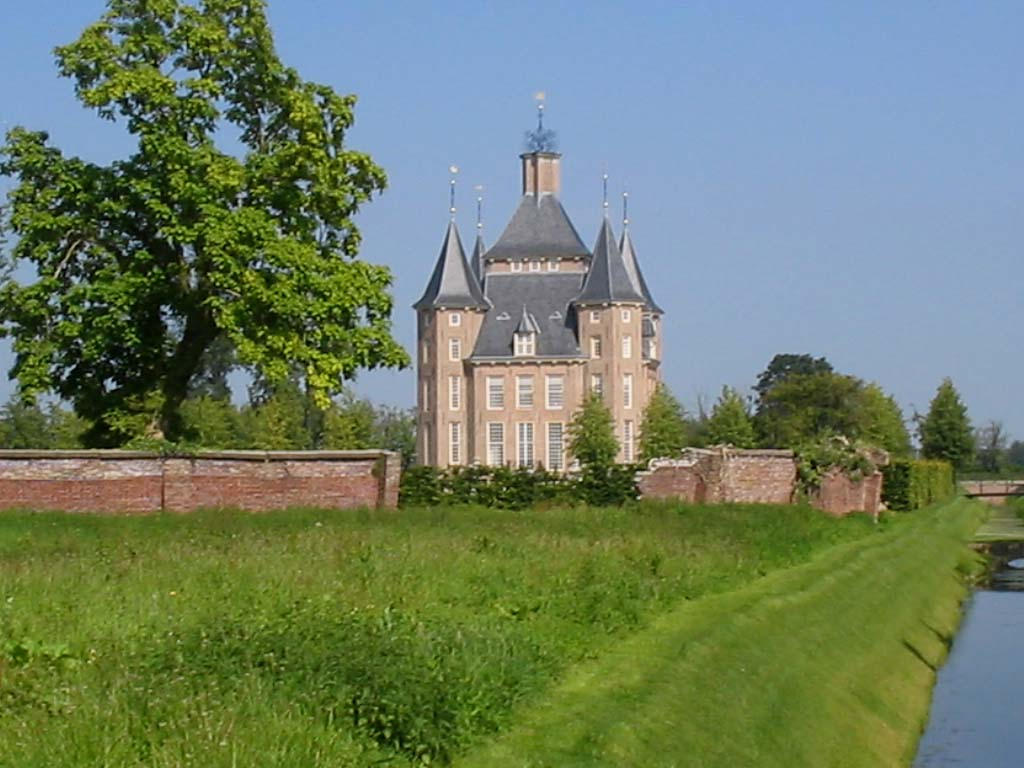
- Heemstede Castle

- Location in the Netherlands Heemstede (Netherlands)
- Coordinates: 52°2′16″N 5°7′27″E
- Country: Netherlands
- Province: Utrecht
- Municipality: Houten
- Time zone: UTC+1 (CET)
  - Summer (DST): UTC+2 (CEST)
- Postal code: 3991
- Dialing code: 030

Heemstede is a hamlet in the central Netherlands. It is located 3 km west of Houten, Utrecht. The hamlet is known for Heemstede Castle (1645).

Until 1812, Heemstede was a separate heerlijkheid. Between 1818 and 1857 it was a part of Oud-Wulven, until that municipality merged with Houten. The area had 75 inhabitants around 1850.

== History ==
It was first mentioned in 1219 as in Hemsteden, and means "place with houses". Heemstede is not a statistical entity, and the postal authorities have placed it under Houten, and there are no place name signs. Nowadays, it consists of about 20 houses.

== Castle Heemstede ==
A fortified farm called Heemstede was first mentioned in 1323. Between 1398 and 1404, a tower was constructed, and it officially became a castle in 1536. In 1614, the castle became derelict and turned into a ruin. In 1645, a manor house was built about 500 metres to the north. During World War II, it was in use as monastery. In 1971, the building was squatted, and burnt down in 1987. It was rebuilt in 1998 and served as a restaurant which went bankrupt in 2012. The estate is now private property.

== Gallery ==
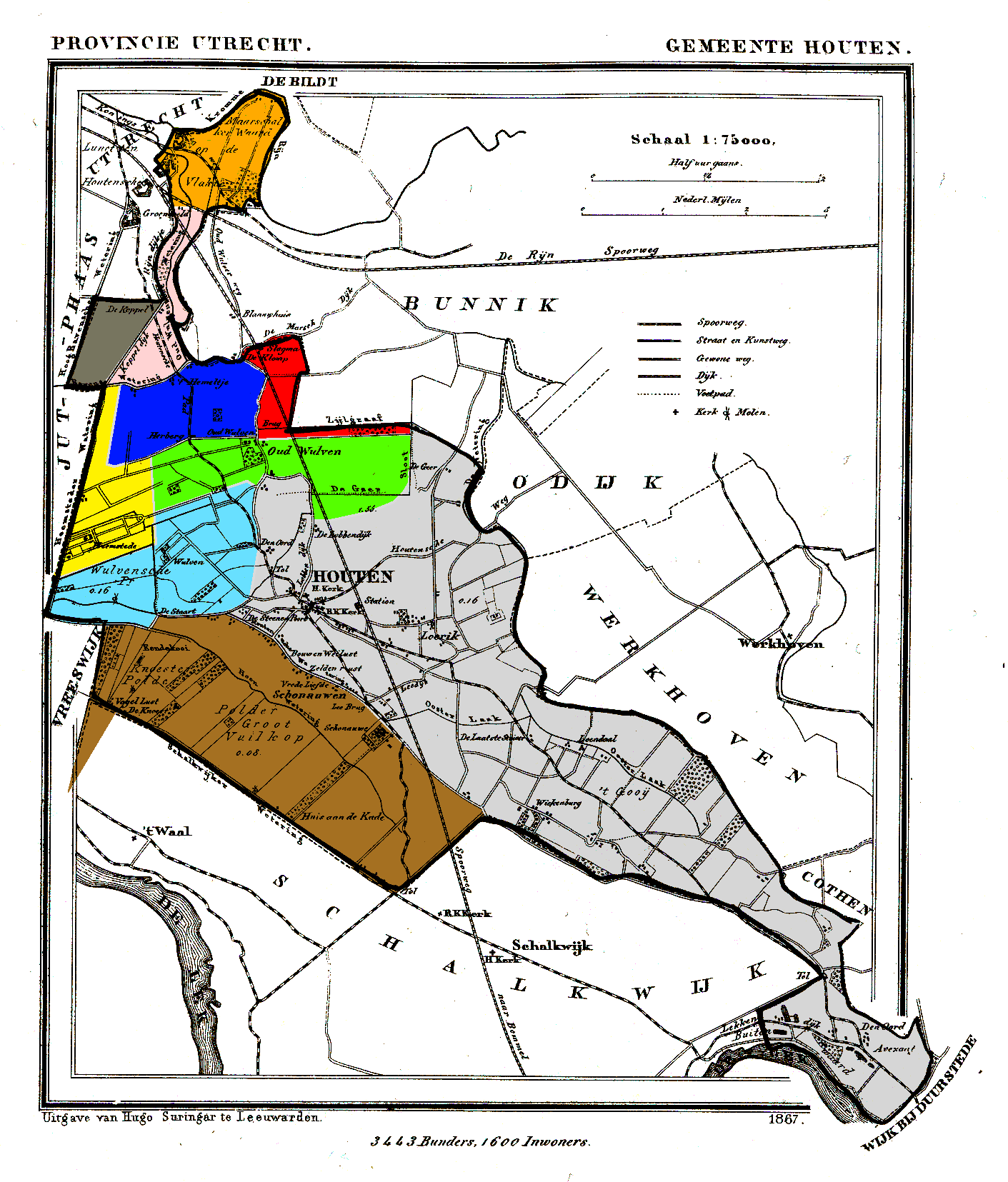
Houten in 1868, with Heemstede in yellow.

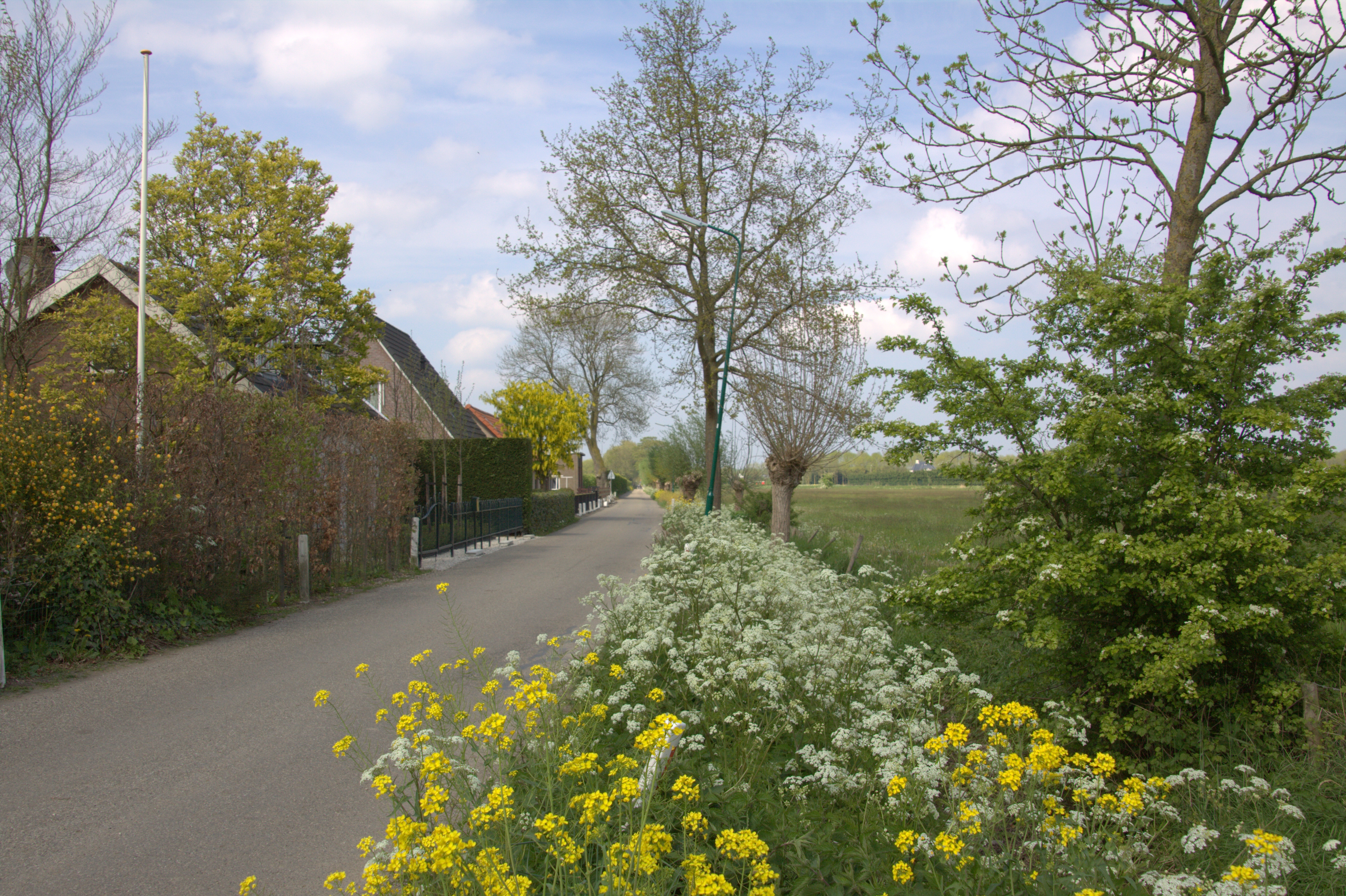
Street view of Heemstede
