= Baambrugge =

- Town
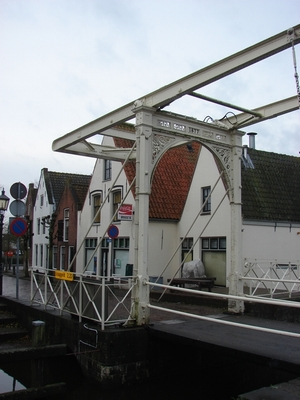

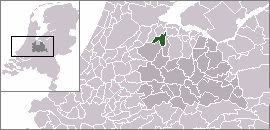

- The town centre (dark green) and the statistical district (light green) of Baambrugge in the municipality of Abcoude.
- Coordinates: 52°14′46″N 4°59′19″E
- Country: Netherlands
- Province: Utrecht
- Municipality: De Ronde Venen

Population (2007)
  - Total: 1,100
- Time zone: UTC+1 (CET)
  - Summer (DST): UTC+2 (CEST)

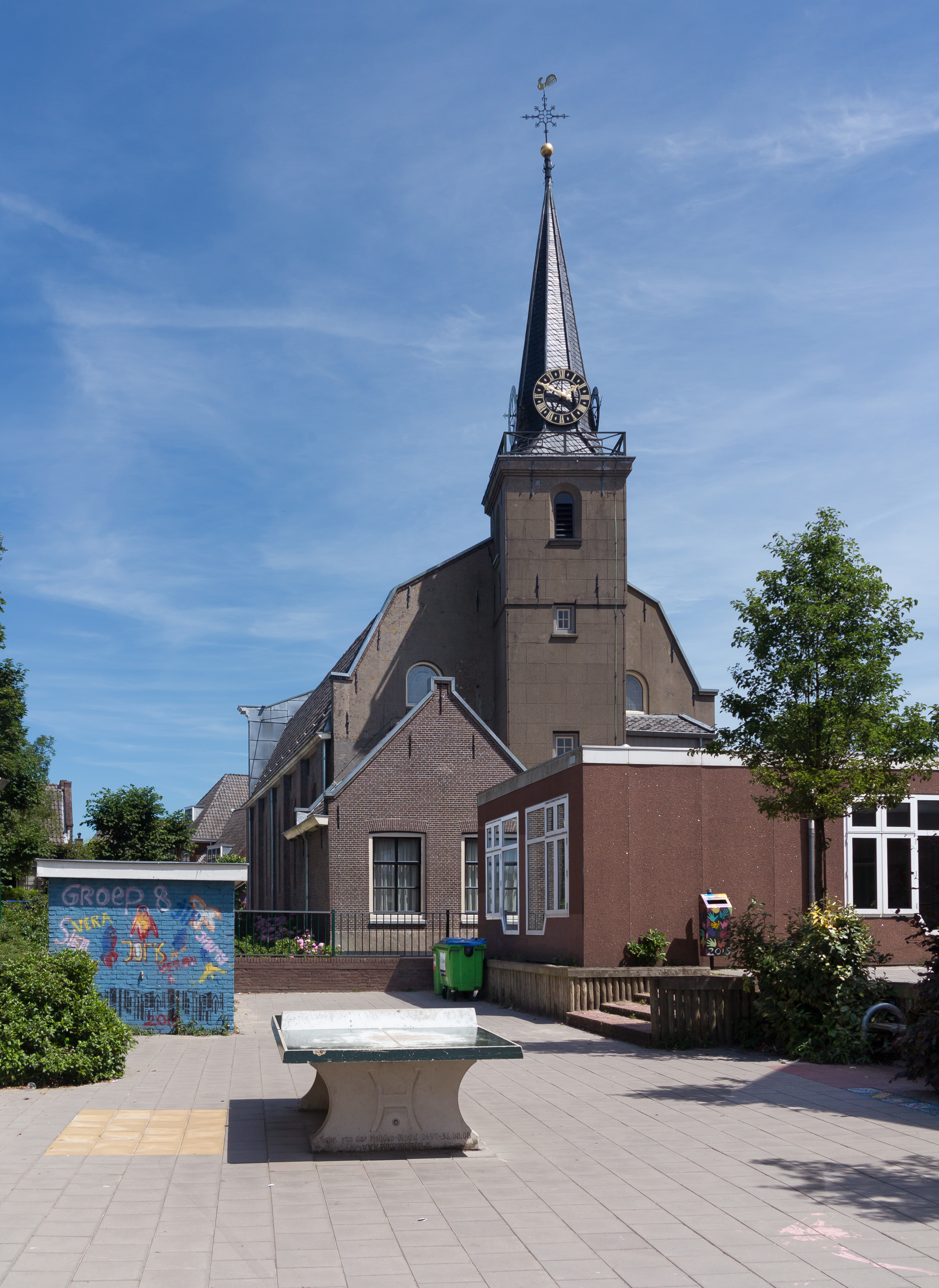
Baambrugge, reformed church and primary school

Baambrugge is a village on the river Amstel in the Dutch province of Utrecht. It is a part of the municipality of De Ronde Venen and lies about 14 km southeast of Amsterdam. In 2001 the village of Baambrugge had 925 inhabitants. The built-up area of the town was 0.21 km² and contained 365 residences. The statistical area "Baambrugge", which also can include the peripheral parts of the village, as well as the surrounding countryside, has a population of around 1000.

== History ==
The village used to be a separate municipality, under the name Abcoude-Baambrugge. In 1941, it merged with Abcoude-Proosdij to form the municipality Abcoude.

The Beach Boys recorded their 1973 album Holland in Baambrugge, using a reconstructed studio sent from California.

The town used to have many small shops but only one is still there.
