= Wulverhorst =

Coordinates: 52°3′51″N 4°53′30″E

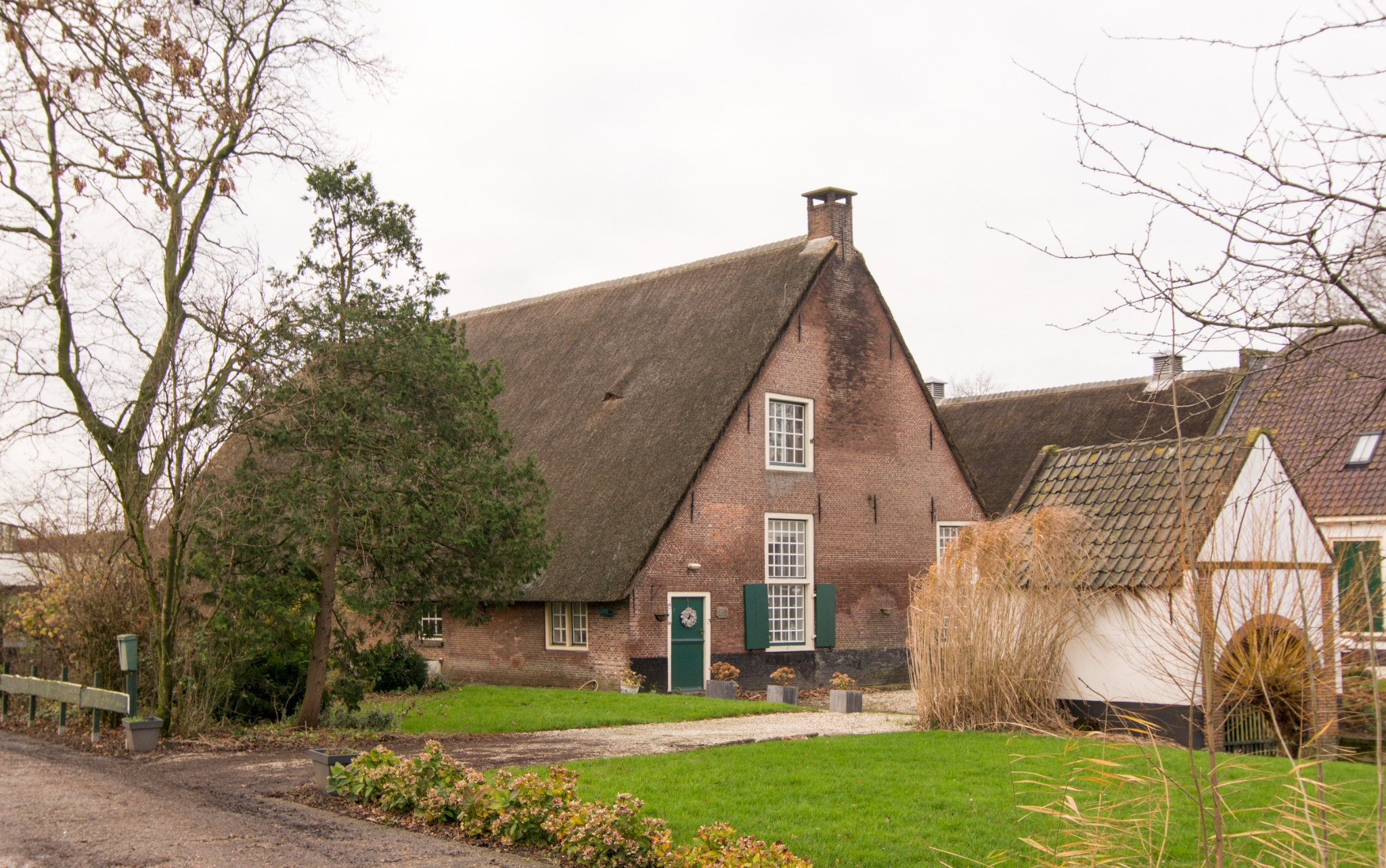

Wulverhorst is a former municipality in the Dutch province of Utrecht. It was located south of Woerden. Wulverhorst was a separate municipality between 1818 and 1857, when it was merged with Linschoten. The area is now a part of Montfoort as well as Woerden.

On the grounds there has existed a castle from the 13th century which felt into ruins and was finally demolished in 1837.

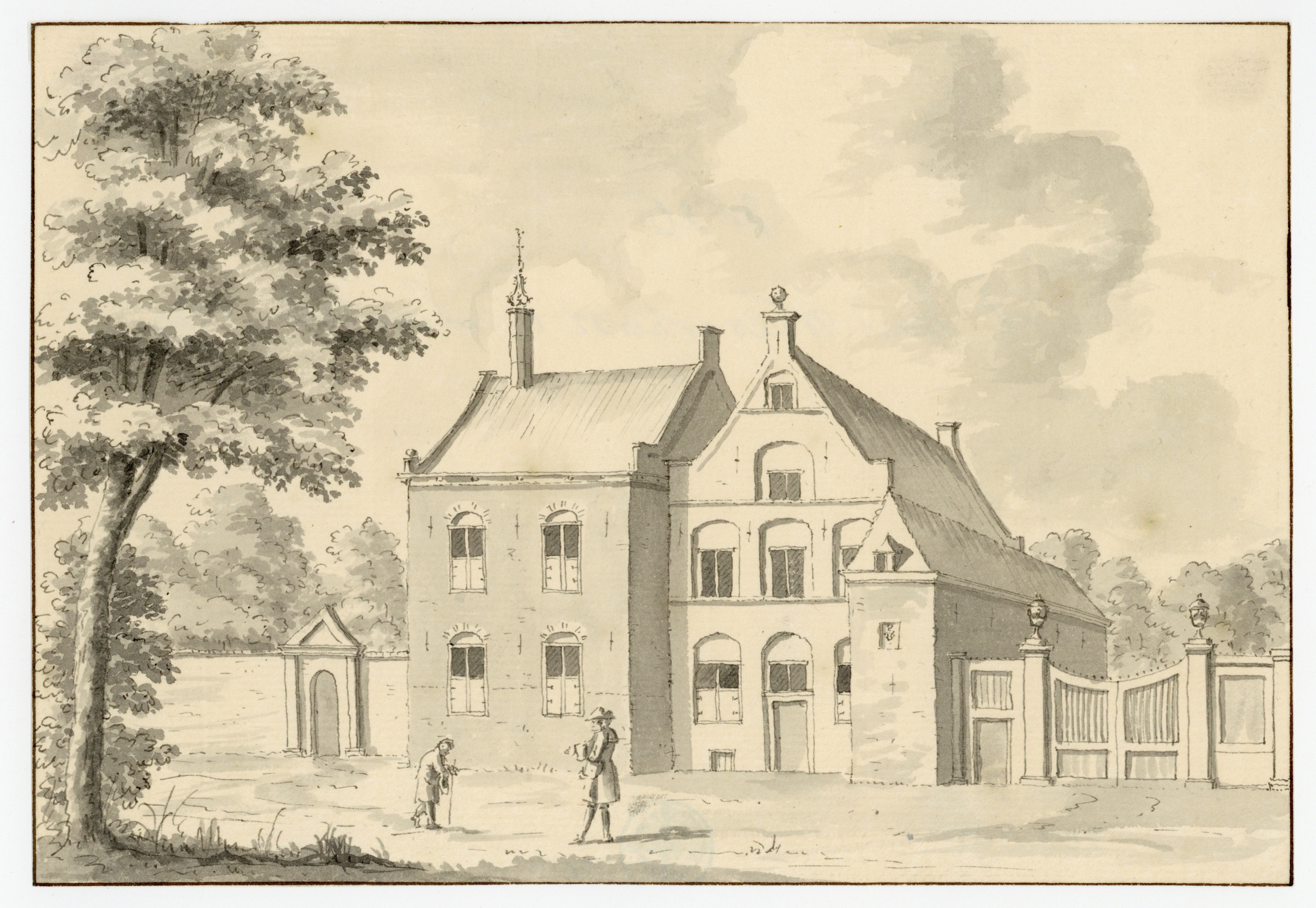
Drawing of the castle from 1729
