= Westbroek =

- Village
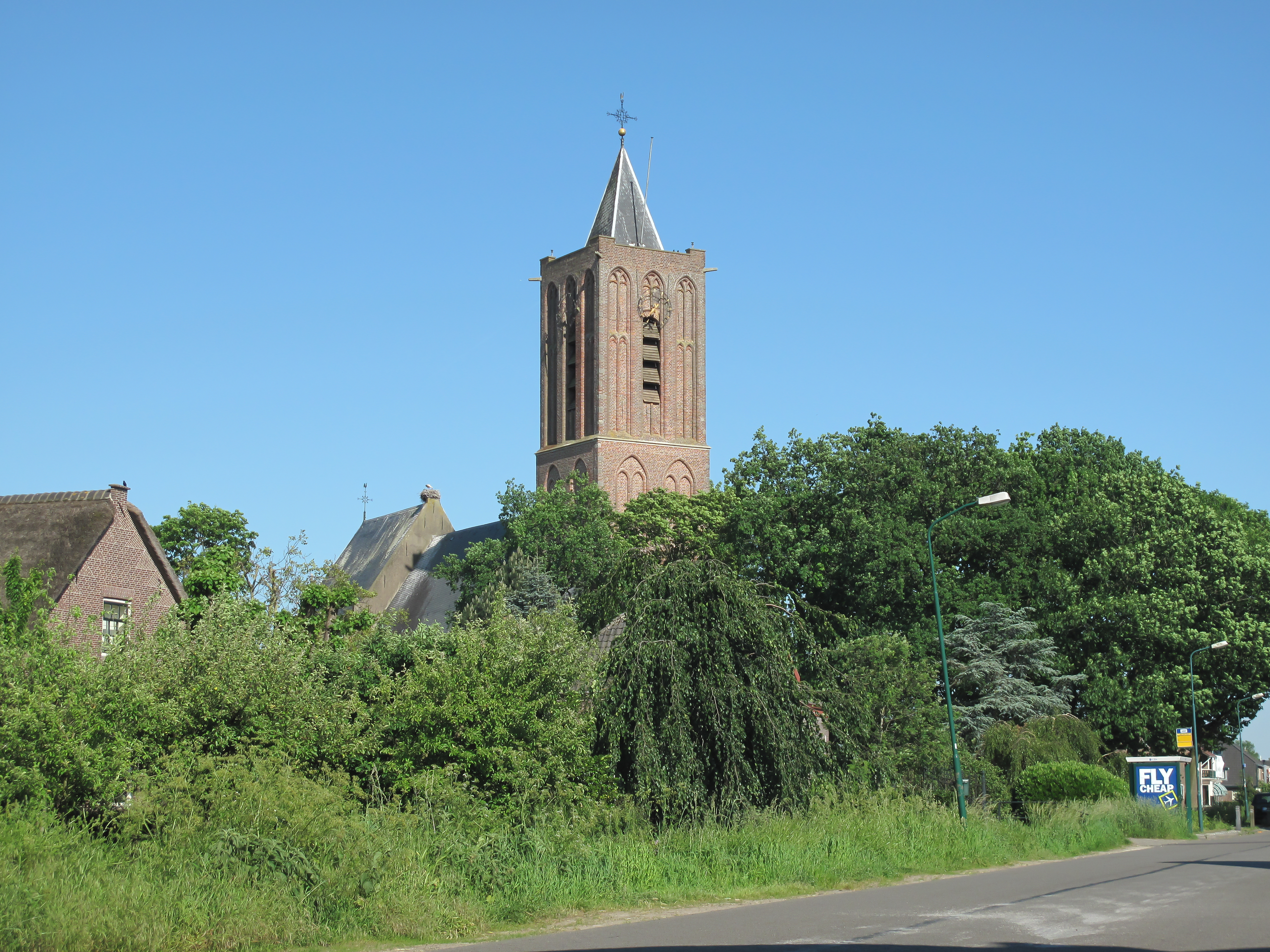
- Reformed church

- Location in the Netherlands Westbroek (Netherlands)
- Coordinates: 52°9′0″N 5°8′0″E
- Country: Netherlands
- Province: Utrecht
- Municipality: De Bilt

Area
  - Total: 12.37 km^{2} (4.78 sq mi)
- Elevation: 0.5 m (1.6 ft)

Population (2024)
  - Total: 1,197
  - Density: 96.77/km^{2} (250.6/sq mi)
- Time zone: UTC+1 (CET)
  - Summer (DST): UTC+2 (CEST)
- Postal code: 3615
- Dialing code: 0346

Westbroek is a village in the Dutch province of Utrecht. It is a part of the municipality of De Bilt, and lies about 6 km northwest of Bilthoven.

Westbroek consists mainly of a ribbon of farms along a dike. The village is surrounded by a number of polders: the Polder Westbroek, the Kerkeindse Polder, and the Polder Achttienhoven in the north, and the Molenpolder and Polder de Kooi in the south. The Molenpolder is a nature reserve.

== History ==
Westbroek used to be a separate municipality. It merged into Maartensdijk in 1957, and has been a part of the De Bilt municipality since 2001.

The church dates from 1467.

On 26 December 1481, Westbroek was the site of a major battle, known as the Battle of Westbroek, between the armies of the prince-bishopric of Utrecht and Holland, with Holland winning a decisive victory.

== Gallery ==
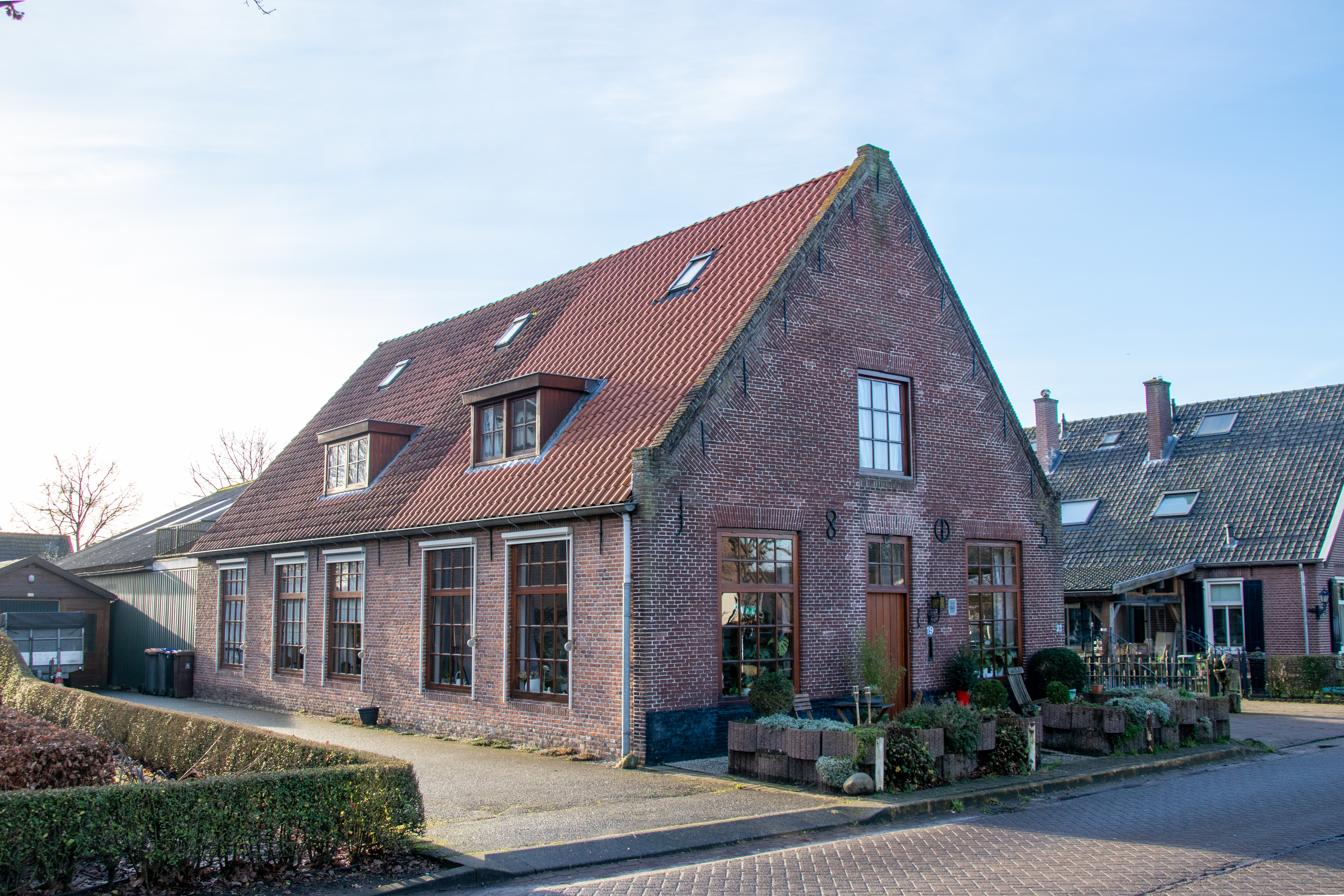
House in Westbroek

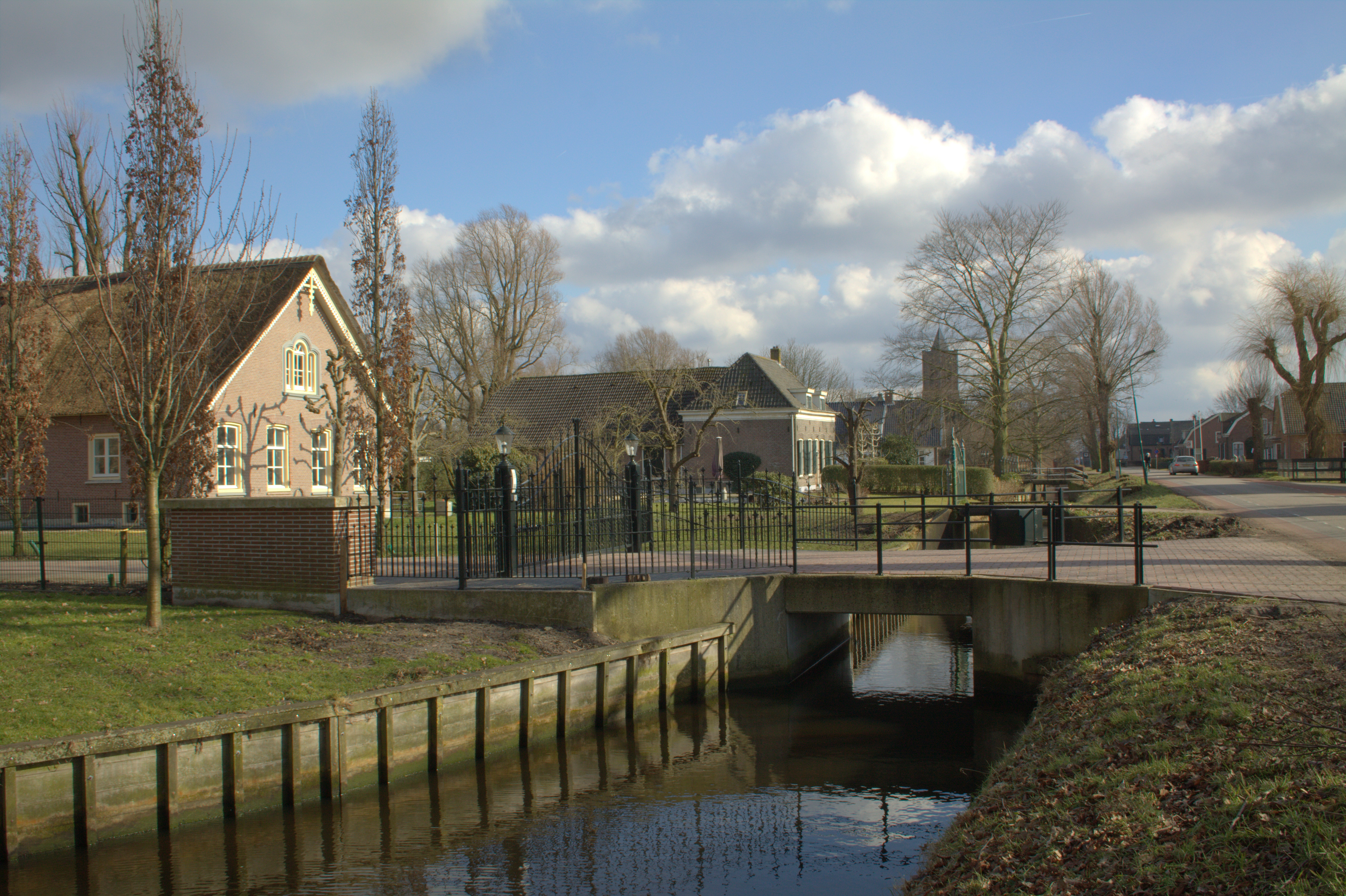
Canal view

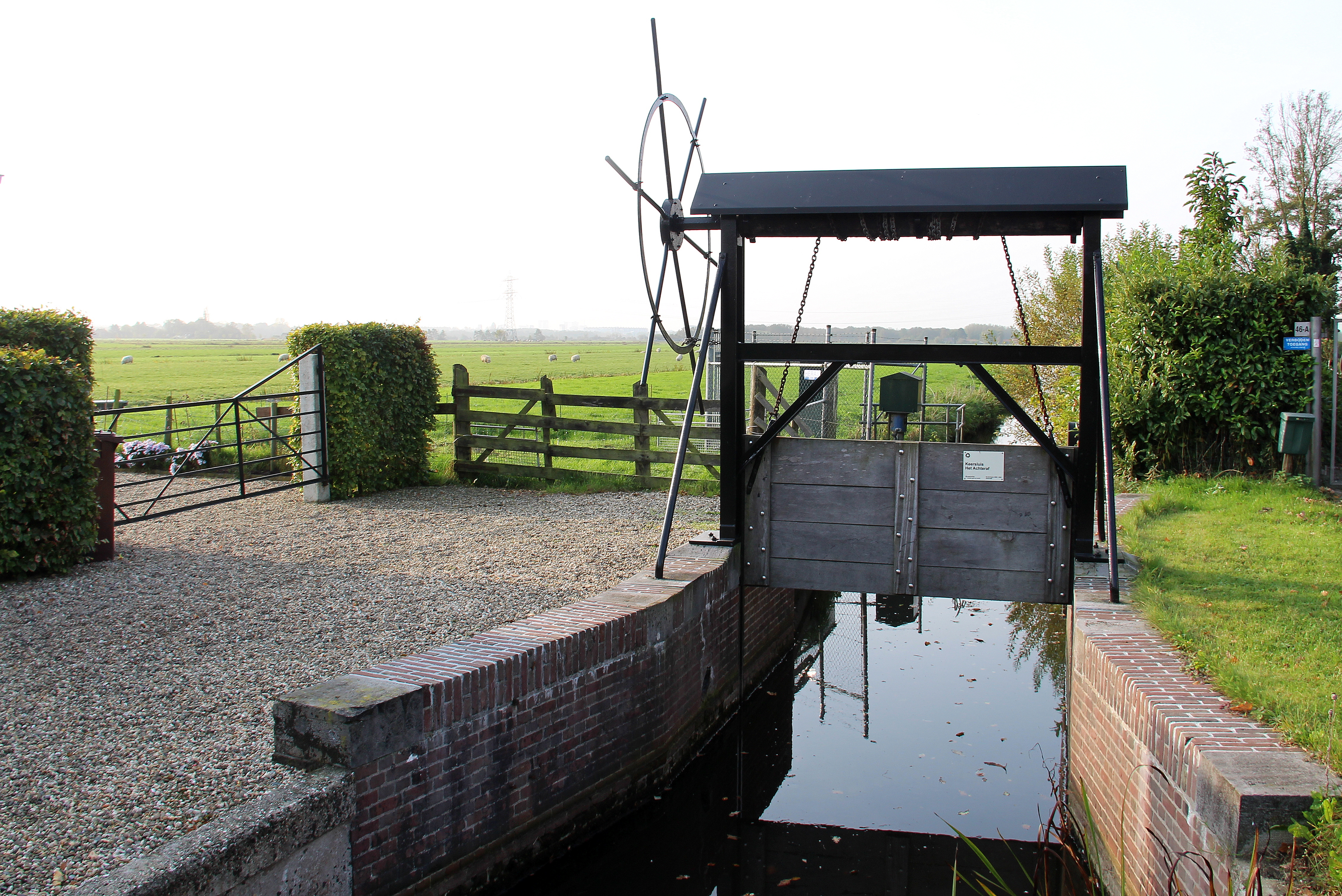
Sluice

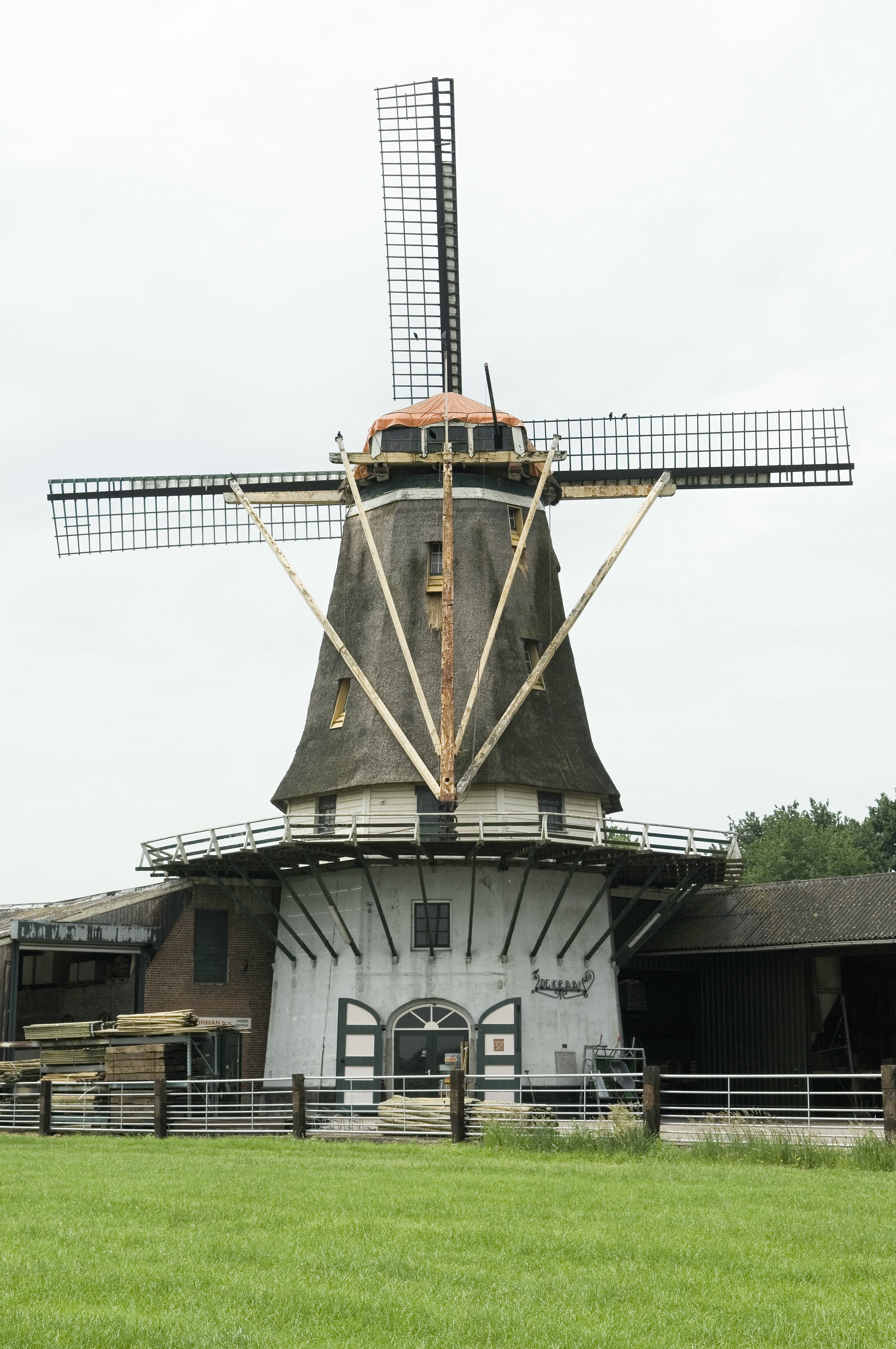
Windmill De Kraai
