= Jüngere Hochmeisterchronik =

The Jüngere Hochmeisterchronik, Croniken van der Duytscher Oirden, or Utrecht Chronicle of the Teutonic Order is a Middle Dutch chronicle of the Teutonic Order. It was written in or around the city of Utrecht in the Low Countries in several phases: around 1480, around 1491, and with some minor alterations after 1492 (possibly around 1496). It has been referred to as “the final piece of the puzzle that is the official historiographic tradition of the Teutonic Order”. The anonymous chronicle was likely authored by the land commander of the Utrecht bailiwick of the Teutonic Order, Johan van Drongelen, in cooperation with his personal secretary Hendrik Gerardsz. van Vianen.

The text is often used to interpret the self-image of the Teutonic Order after the loss of territory in Prussia, following the Thirteen Years' War (1454-1466). Recent scholarship has also suggested that the text may have been written in response to the Hospitallers aggressive propaganda campagne after the successfully repelled siege of Rhodes in 1480.

== Name ==
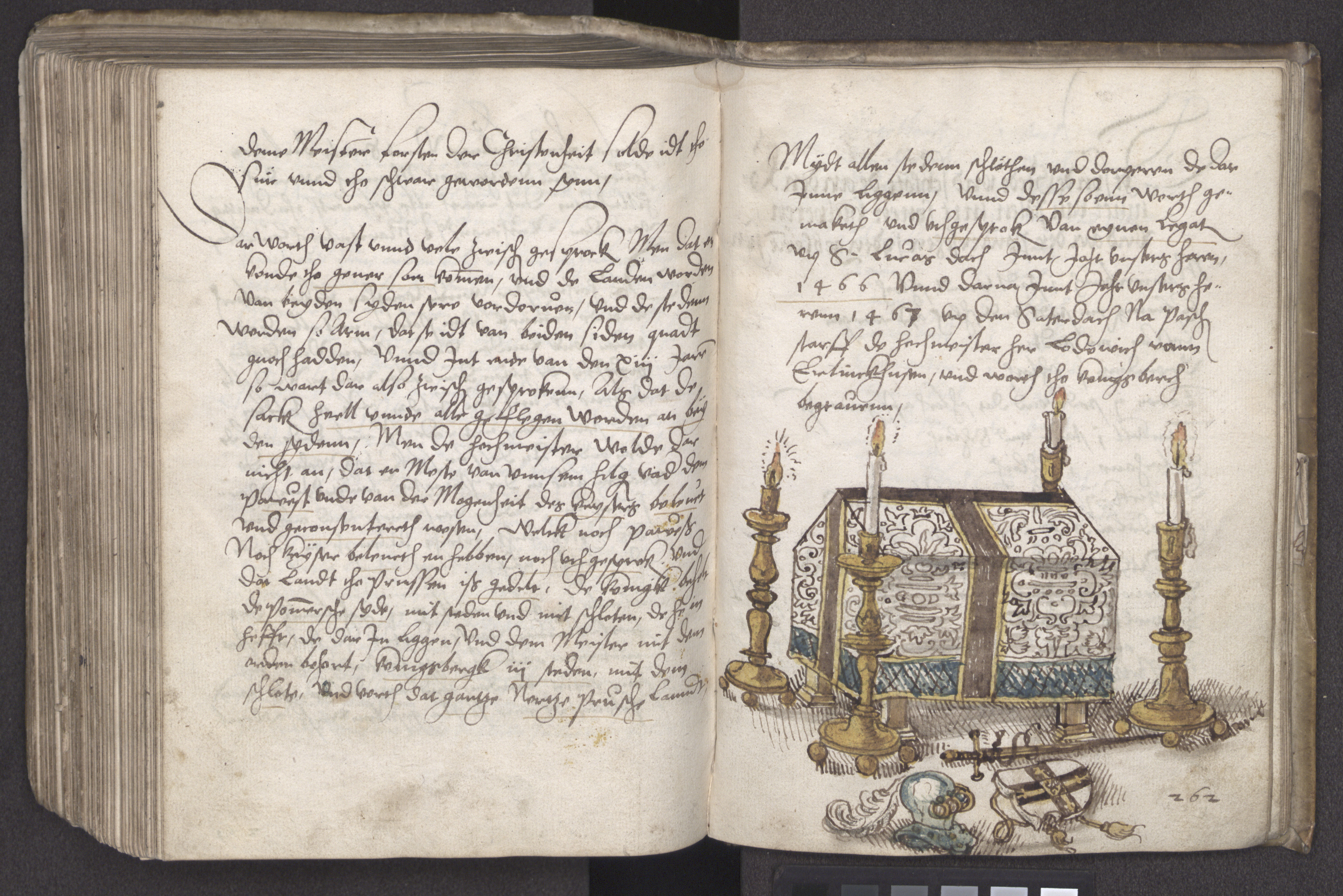
Tartu, University Library, Mscr. 154, fol. 261v-262r: Tomb of Grand Master Ludwig of Erlichshausen

The chronicle is known by several names. It was once referred to as "Preussischen Chronica" (Prussian Chronicle) and later labelled "Order's Chronicle or Grand Masters' Chronicle" by Christoph Hartknoch. In the nineteenth century it received the title Große Hochmeisterchronik (Great Grand Masters' Chronicle) by Max Töppen. Theodor Hirsch then changed this to Jüngere Hochmeisterchronik (Younger Grand Masters' Chronicle), in order to distinguish it from the Ältere Hochmeisterchronik (Older Grand Masters' Chronicle), written a few decades earlier in Prussia. This title, which accompanies an edition of a part of the text, is most commonly used in modern (German) scholarship.

However, the text is self-titled Croniken van der Duytscher Oirden der ridderscap van den huse ende hospitael Onser Liever Vrouwen van Jherusalem (Chronicle of the Teutonic Order of the Knights of the House and Hospital of Our Beloved Lady of Jerusalem) or Croniken van der Duytscher Oirden in short. This contemporary title is sometimes used in Dutch scholarship. In English scholarly literature, Utrecht Chronicle of the Teutonic Order alludes to the original title and the geographical origin of the text.

== Content and sources ==
The text opens with a lengthy prologue, which places the origins of the Teutonic Order in a biblical past, starting with Noah and Melchizedek. The prologue identifies the true place of origin of the Teutonic Order at Mount Zion in Jerusalem, overshadowing the traditional place of origin at Acre during the Third Crusade. Various Old Testament figures, such as Moses, David, and Judas Maccabeus, are linked to Mount Zion and presented as prefigurations of the Teutonic Knights. Numerous events of the New Testament are similarly associated with Mount Zion, emphasising the holiness of the place.

The remainder of the text is strictly organised by the sequential list of grand masters of the Teutonic Order. It alternates between the history of the Holy Land, Livonia and Prussia. For this purpose, the author combined forty to fifty different sources in Latin, Dutch, German, and possibly French. The sources include a wide range of biblical literature, crusade narratives (William of Tyre, Jacques de Vitry, Oliver of Paderborn, Vincent of Beauvais, Wilbrand of Oldenburg, Richard of San Germano, Johannes de Beke, Ludolf of Sudheim), Teutonic Order chronicles (amongst others Peter of Dusburg, Nikolaus of Jeroschin, the Ältere Hochmeisterchronik, Livonian Rhymed Chronicle), as well as several archival documents.

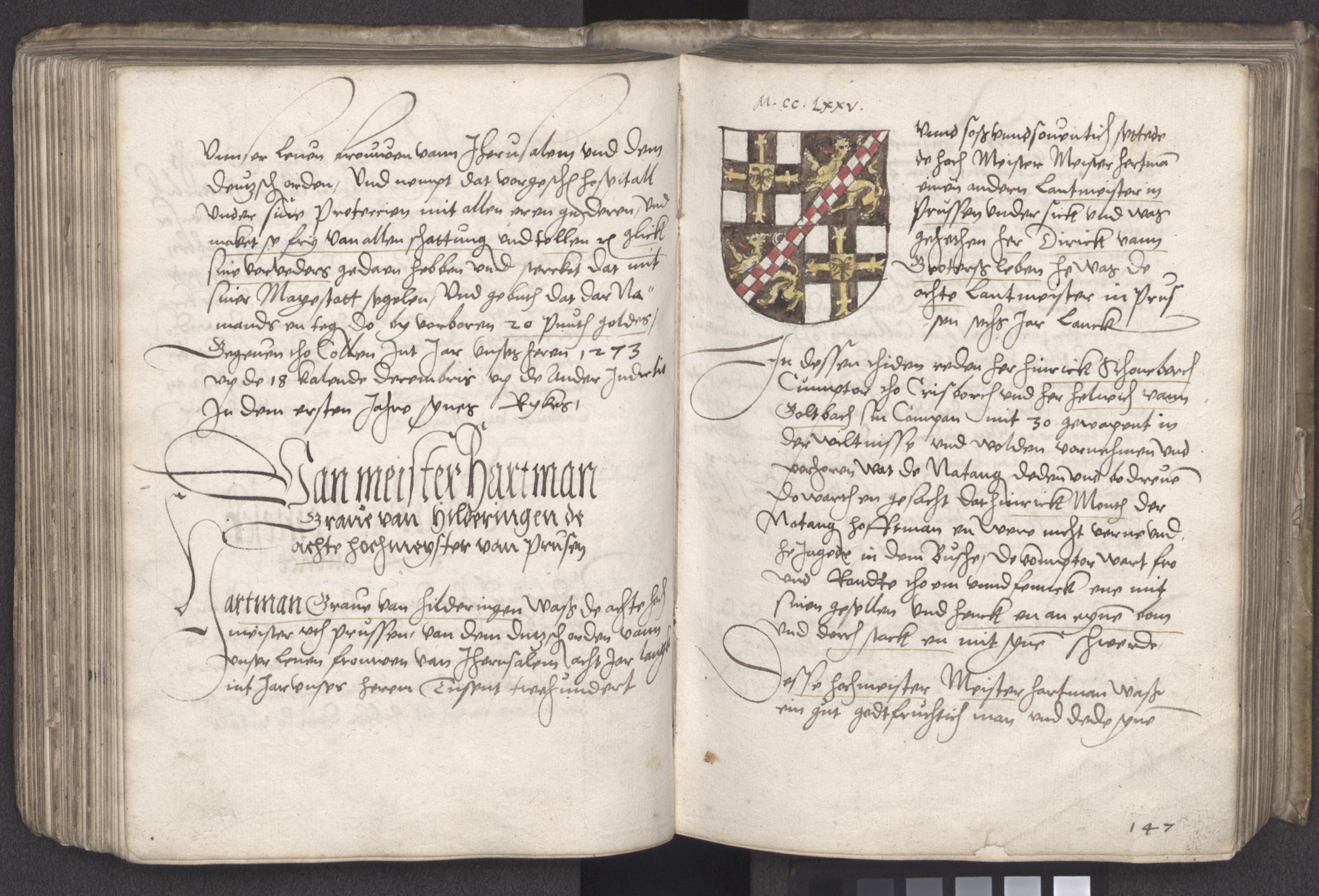
Tartu, University Library, Mscr. 154, fol. 146v-147r: Coat of arms of Grand Master Hartmann of Heldrungen

The main body of the text ends with the death of Grand Master Ludwig of Ellrichshausen in 1467, followed by a list of commanderies in Prussia and Livonia. The text ends with a history of the Utrecht bailiwick and the lives of the land commanders until Johan van Drongelen himself (1469-1492). Interwoven throughout the text are papal and imperial privileges granted to the Teutonic Order, as well as several indulgences. Coats of arms accompany all descriptions of the grand masters and land commanders.

== Reception ==
The chronicle was first produced in Middle Dutch in the Northern Low Countries, primarily, it seems, for an audience of Teutonic Order members. Soon after its creation, the text is found in both Livonia (Low German) and Prussia (High German). The Prussian manuscripts were subsequently adapted and extended, after which they found their way into Prussian urban cultural spheres (Johann Funck having possessed two manuscripts), as well as Teutonic Order audiences in the southern parts of the Holy Roman Empire, where the first reception of the text can be dated to 1528. Including all its adaptations and known, but now missing manuscripts, nearly sixty manuscripts have been identified thus far.

== Editions ==
- Matthaeus, A., Veteris Ævi Analecta, Seu Vetera Aliquot Monumenta, Quæ Hactenus Nondum Visa. 1st ed. Vol. X. Leiden, 1710, pp. 1–284; Matthaeus, A., ed. Veteris Ævi Analecta, Seu Vetera Aliquot Monumenta, Quæ Hactenus Nondum Visa. 2nd ed. Vol. V. The Hague, 1738, pp. 631–818.
- Napiersky, C.E. ‘Auszug Aus Der Chronik Des Ordens Vom Deutschen Hause Zu St. Marien in Jerusalem, Soweit Solche Auf Livland Bezug Nimmt, Mit Einer Einleitung, Abweichende Lesarten, Anmerkungen und Einigen Worterklärungen’. In Scriptores Rerum Livonicarum, 1:829–906. Riga/Leipzig: Frantzen, 1853, pp. 833–836.
- Hirsch, Th. ‘Die Jüngere Hochmeisterchronik’. In Scriptores Rerum Prussicarum. Die Geschichtsquellen Der Preussischen Vorzeit Bis Zum Untergange Der Ordensherrschaft, edited by Th. Hirsch, E. Strehlke, and M. Töppen, V:1–172. Leipzig, 1874.
- Geer van Oudegein, J.J. de. Archieven Der Ridderlijke Duitsche Orde, Balie van Utrecht. Vol. II. II vols. Utrecht, 1871, pp. 233–258.
- Stapel, R.J. ed., R.J. Stapel and C.M. Saridjo translators, The Utrecht Chronicle of the Teutonic Order. A History of the Crusades in the Holy Land, Prussia, and Livonia (Edition and Translation) (Abingdon/New York: Routledge 2024).
