= Usinger =

Usinger is a surname.

Notable people with the name Usinger include:

- Christian Usinger (1894–1949), German military officer and later prisoner of war
- Fritz Usinger (1895–1982), German writer
- Robert L. Usinger (1912–1968), American entomologist
- Rudolf Usinger (1835–1874), German historian

== See also ==
- Usinger's, a sausage-making company
