= Ernst Strehlke =

German historian (1834-1869)

Ernst Strehlke (September 27, 1834, in Berlin – March 23, 1869, Berlin) was a German historian and archivist. He dedicated his rather short life to the history of the Teutonic Order.

== Life ==
Strehlke was born on September 27, 1834, in Berlin as the second son of Friedrich Strehlke, a professor at the Köllnisches Gymnasium, and his wife Antonie, nee Weiß. After his father was appointed director of the Danzig Petrischule in 1838, Strehlke attended his father's school and the Academic Gymnasium Danzig. There he encountered Theodor Hirsch, who awakened his interest in the history of Prussia. When Hirsch was commissioned by the Danzig Magistrate to reorganize the Danzig City Archives, he involved Strehlke in the work while he was still a student.

=== Studies ===
Starting in 1852, Strehlke studied at the Friedrich-Wilhelms-Universität in Berlin. He attended lectures by philosophers Friedrich Adolf Trendelenburg and Karl Werder, philologists August Boeckh, Carl Eduard Geppert, Moriz Haupt, and Martin Hertz, historians Ernst Curtius, Siegfried Hirsch, Rudolf Köpke, Leopold von Ranke, and Wilhelm Wattenbach, Germanists Friedrich von der Hagen and Hans Ferdinand Maßmann, legal scholars Heinrich Eduard Dirksen, Rudolf von Gneist, Adolf Helfferich, and Carl Gustav Homeyer, as well as geographer Carl Ritter. During his studies, Strehlke served as an amanuensis at the library of the Prussian War Academy. Due to the onset of lung disease, he abandoned his desire to become a teacher. His treatise on Henry III titled Gesta Henrici III imperatoris won an award in 1854. In 1856, he obtained his PhD in Berlin with an inaugural dissertation on this ruler.

He devoted himself to the unfinished work of Heinrich Wilhelm Schulz on the medieval art monuments of Southern Italy and assisted Ferdinand von Quast in its publication. The extensive project was financed by Schulz's brother, Karl Wilhelm. Strehlke alone handled the selection and criticism of the document book, which included 484 documents. He also contributed some drawings for the woodcuts printed in the text volumes. However, his name was missing from the title page of the work, which was published in Easter 1860 and to which he had devoted his youthful enthusiasm during the years 1856-1860: Denkmäler der Kunst des Mittelalters in Unteritalien von Heinrich Wilhelm Schulz. Nach dem Tode des Verfassers herausgegeben von Ferdinand von Quast (Dresden 1860, 4 volumes of text and document book in large quarto, along with an atlas of 100 copperplate engravings in the largest folio).

=== Secret State Archives ===
In 1860, Strehlke joined the Royal Secret State Archives. After becoming a secret archive secretary in the fall of 1861, he initially compiled the register of the Margraviate of Brandenburg. In addition, he compiled the repertory of the documents of the Oberpräsidium of the Province of Posen, from which the State Archives of Posen emerged. After an unsuccessful convalescent leave at Lake Geneva, he was sent to the archives of the Foreign Ministry in 1864, where he found his main task as cataloger of the Teutonic Order sources.

=== Scriptores rerum Prussicarum ===
Strehlke's lasting achievement lies in the publication of the historical sources for the Deutschordensstaat. In Volume 1, the previously fragmented printed verse chronicle by Nikolaus von Jeroschin is compiled. Volume 2 contains the Livonian chronicle by Hermann von Wartberge, discovered by Strehlke in Danzig. In Volume 3, the newly discovered Thorner Annals, along with the chronicle by Johann von Posilge and Detmar's 'Lübische Chronik', are published. Volume 4 was published posthumously and includes the 'Banderia Prutenorum' by Jan Długosz. Finally, Volume 5 consists of records on the history of the Diocese of Pomesania.

== Works ==
- Alterthümer des nördlichen Pommerellens. In: Neue Preußische Provinzial-Blätter, Andere Folge, Band 8, Königsberg 1855, pp. 41–54.
- De Heinrici III imperatoris bellis Ungaricis. Dissertatio inauguralis historica. Inaugural Dissertation, Berlin 1856. Vita, p. 48 f. Digitalisat.
- Brief Abt Berno’s von Reichenau an König Heinrich III. In: Archiv für Kunde österreichischer Geschichtsquellen. Band 20, Wien 1858, pp. 197–206. Digitalisat.
- Denkmäler der Kunst des Mittelalters in Unteritalien by Heinrich Wilhelm Schulz. Edited by Ferdinand von Quast. 4 volumes of text and document book in gr. 4°, with an atlas of 100 copperplate engravings in the largest folio. Dresden 1860 (participated, without mention on the title page).
- with Theodor Hirsch (ed.) and Max Toeppen (ed.): Scriptores rerum Prussicarum. Die Geschichtsquellen der preußischen Vorzeit bis zum Untergange der Ordensherrschaft, 5 volumes. Leipzig 1861–1874. Reprint Frankfurt am Main 1965. Contains:
  - Di Kronike von Pruzinlant by Nikolaus von Jeroschin. Volume 1, Leipzig 1861.
  - Zwei Fragmente einer kurzen Reimchronik von Preussen. Volume 2, Leipzig 1863.
  - Kurze Preußische Annalen. 1190–1337. Volume 3, Leipzig 1866.
  - Annales expeditialis Prussici. 1233–1414. Volume 3, Leipzig 1866.
  - Franciscani Thorunensis Annales Prussici (941–1410). Volume 3, Leipzig 1866.
  - Johanns von Posilge, Officials von Pomesanien, Chronik des Landes Preussen (von 1360 an, fortgesetzt bis 1419). Volume 3, Leipzig 1866.
  - Zugleich mit den auf Preussen bezüglichen Abschnitten aus der Chronik Detmars von Lübeck. Volume 3, Leipzig 1866.
  - Chronica terrae Prussiae 1029 (sc. 1098) – 1450. Volume 3, Leipzig 1866.
  - Aus polnischen Annalen. Volume 3, Leipzig 1866.
  - Über einen kürzlich aufgefundenen Siegelstempel Herzog Mestwins I. von Ostpommern. Volume 3, Leipzig 1866.
  - Banderia Prutenorum. Volume 4, Leipzig 1870.
  - Aufzeichnungen zur Geschichte des Bisthums Pomes
- Hartmann’s von Heldrungen, Hochmeisters des deutschen Ordens, Bericht über die Vereinigung des Schwertordens mit dem deutschen Orden und über die Erwerbung Livlands durch den letzteren. Riga 1865. Google Books.
- Über die Herkunft des Hochmeisters Winrich von Kniprode, in: Zeitschrift für Preußische Geschichte und Landeskunde, Band 5, Berlin 1868, pp. 401–405. Google Books.
- Tabulae Ordinis Theutonici (Urkundenbuch zur Geschichte des Deutschen Ordens), posthumously completed by Philipp Jaffé. 1869. Google Books. Digitized.
- Urkunden Herzog Mestwins II. Aus dem Gräflich Krockow’schen Familienarchive zu Krockow. In: Altpreußische Monatsschrift, Band 8, Königsberg i. Pr. 1871, pp. 633–642. Google Books.

as editor

- Hermann von Wartberge – Chronicon Livoniae (The Livonian Chronicle of Hermann von Wartberge). Leipzig 1863. (Google Books)

== Bibliography ==
- Walther Hubatsch: Strehlke, Ernst, in: Altpreußische Biographie, Vol. II, p. 709. Marburg 1967.
