= Traiectum (Utrecht) =

Former Roman fort in The Netherlands

- Part of Limes Germanicus
- Utrecht in Netherlands
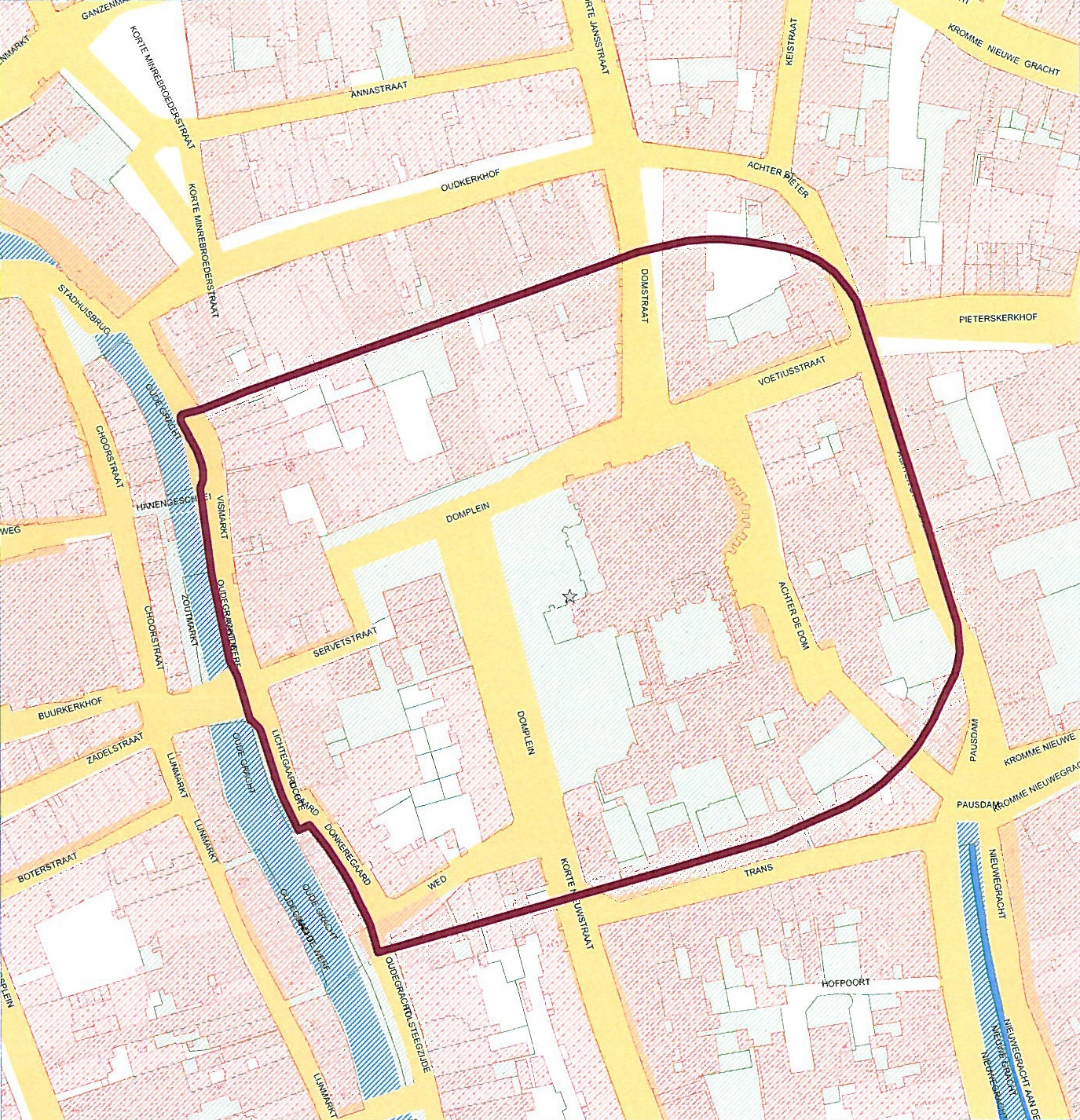
- Location of the castellum in Utrecht

Site information
- Condition: Buried

Location
- Location in the Netherlands
- Coordinates: 52.090692°N 5.121642°E

Site history
- Built: 47 AD
- In use: c. 250 AD
- Materials: Wood, stone

Garrison information
- Designations

UNESCO World Heritage Site
- Part of: Frontiers of the Roman Empire – The Lower German Limes
- Criteria: Cultural: ii, iii, iv
- Reference: 1631-019
- Inscription: 2021 (44th Session)

Traiectum was a Roman fort, on the frontier of the Roman Empire in Germania Inferior. The remains of the fort are in the center of Utrecht, Netherlands, which takes its name from the fort. (Note: As Nicoline van der Sijs explains, the Dutch word trecht is a loan word from the Latin word traiectum, which means river crossing. In the middle ages there were two places originally called Traiectum in the Low Countries, Maas Trecht (Maastricht) and Uut Trecht (Utrecht).)

== History ==
In the Roman Empire Traiectum was one of the forts in the lower Limes Germanicus defensive lines. The Emperor Claudius defined the Rhine downstream from Bonn as the western part of the frontier. He ordered the legions further north to withdraw to this line, which was fortified in AD 47. The Rhine divides into several branches in the Netherlands. The army chose the branch on which modern Utrecht lies as the frontier.

In AD 69-70 Gaius Julius Civilis led the revolt of the Batavi during which the fort was burned. One soldier or officer buried his savings of fifty gold coins at this time. They were found by archaeologists below the layer of burned wood. Once the Romans had restored their authority in the region they rebuilt the fort, again in wood. The fort was manned by about 500 troops. From tile stamps it appears that from AD 88-89 until 275 the fort was manned by cohors II Hispanorum peditata, an auxilia infantry cohort of the Imperial Roman army.

The castellum of Traiectum seems to have been finally destroyed some time before 270, when the Franks invaded. Archeological evidence shows some Roman presence into 4th century, but the castellum was not rebuilt. During the Early Middle Ages another fortification was built on the site, which was destroyed by the Vikings and rebuilt in 818. The site of the fortifications became the center of the medieval town and location of the episcopal see of Utrecht.

== Layout ==
The fort was rebuilt four times, and each time was raised up by adding fill. Periods I-II date from AD 47-69; periods III-IV date from 70 to the end of the 2nd century; and period V dates from the end of the 2nd century to the middle of the 3rd century. The fort was made of wood in periods I-IV, 110 by 130 metres (360 by 430 ft) in size, with ramparts made of earth and wood. In period V it was rebuilt of stone and increased in size to 125 by 150 metres (410 by 492 ft). At this time the gates were flanked by stone gate towers with semi-circular bastions on the exterior.

The fort contained the headquarters building, or principia, within a rectangular courtyard surrounded by a colonnade (portico). The building had hypocaust underfloor heating. Throughout the fort's existence the principia was about 27 by 27 metres (89 by 89 ft) with an atrium, cross hall and five rooms. The central room was the shrine of the legions' standards, or sacellum. This room and the atrium both held stone altars in period V. A protective ditch surrounded the fort throughout its Roman occupation. There were vici to the east and west of the castellum where craftsmen lived who depended on the soldiers. The eastern vicus was at Pieterskerkhof, on the river bank.

== Excavations ==
Some remains of the original fort have been found below the cathedral square at a depth of 3.8 metres (12 ft). Several excavations have been undertaken, mostly between 1929 and 1949. When the city began to build an underground parking deck in the early 1930s, its priorities changed after the remains of the castellum were discovered. Roman artifacts and parts of the fortifications were found, as were partial remains of wooden barracks and traces of the moat. The footings of two of the fort's four gates have since been excavated, and some parts of the barracks from different periods have been revealed. The main building, the principia, has been fully excavated as well. Beginning in 1992, the nearby Duitse Huis, headquarters of the Teutonic Knights' Bailiwick of Utrecht from 1348, was extensively renovated. This included building a new wing of the Grand Hotel Karel V. Traces of a Roman cemetery were found, perhaps associated with the fort.

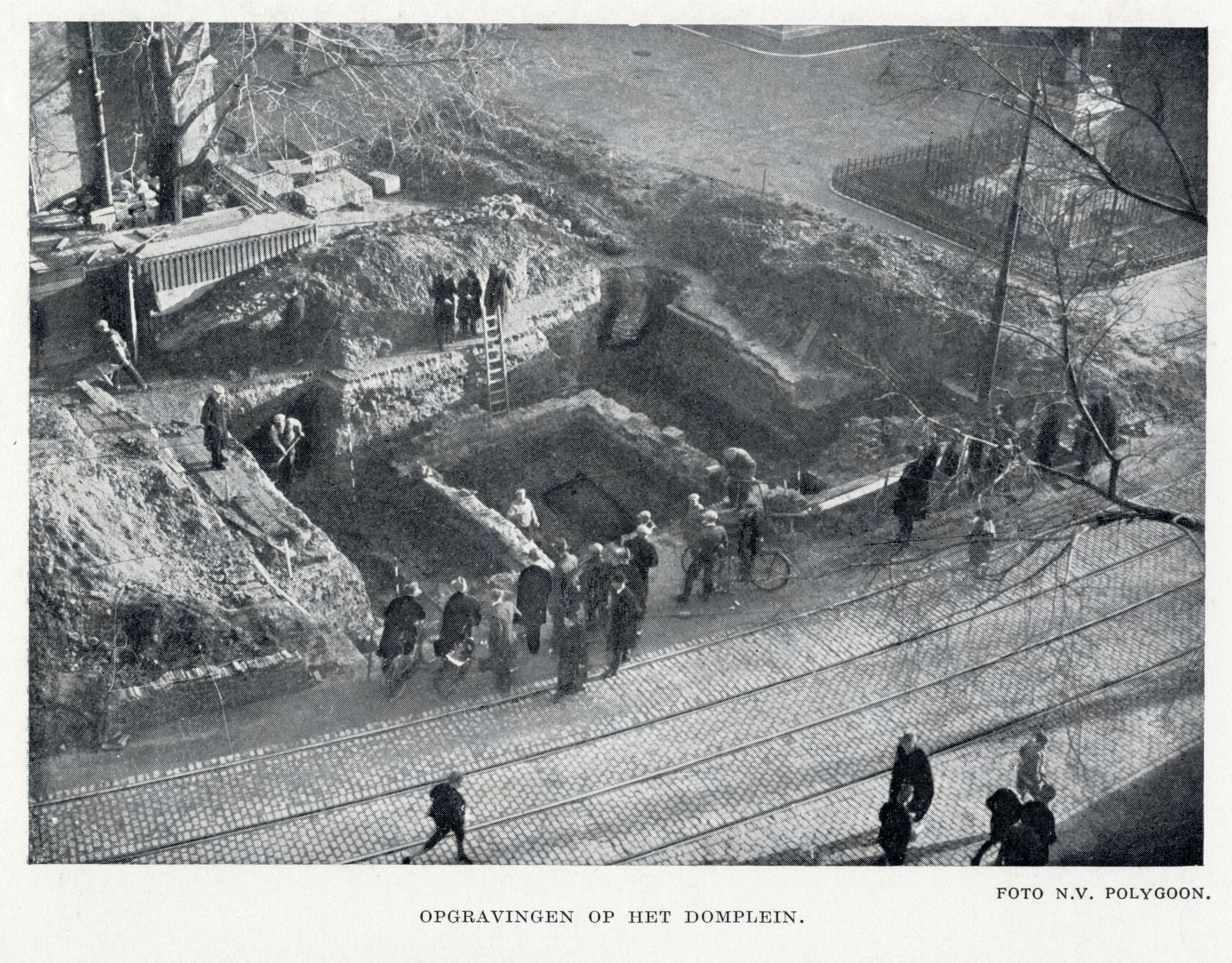
Excavations in 1929

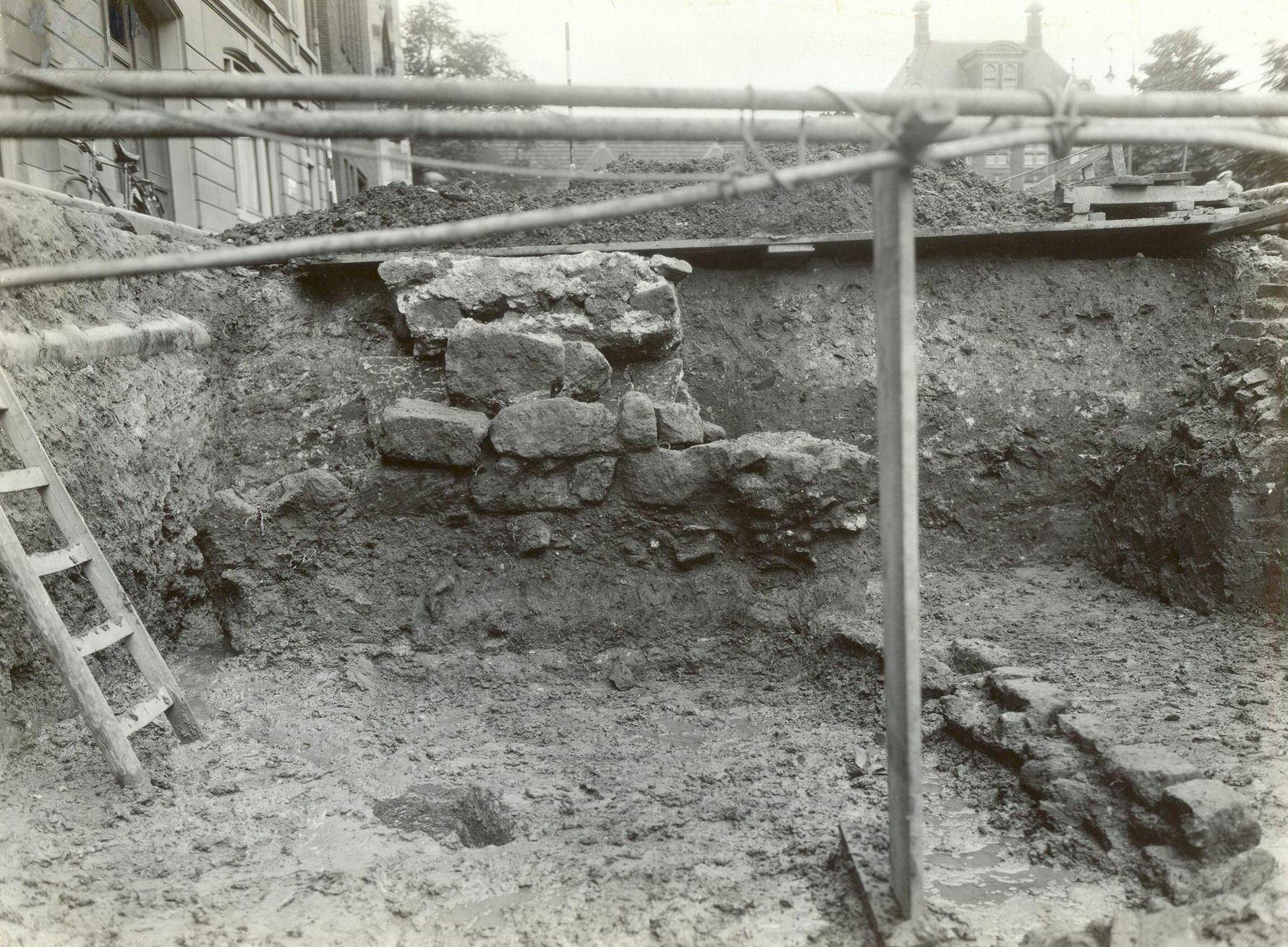
Excavation in 1933. Stone wall is from a barracks

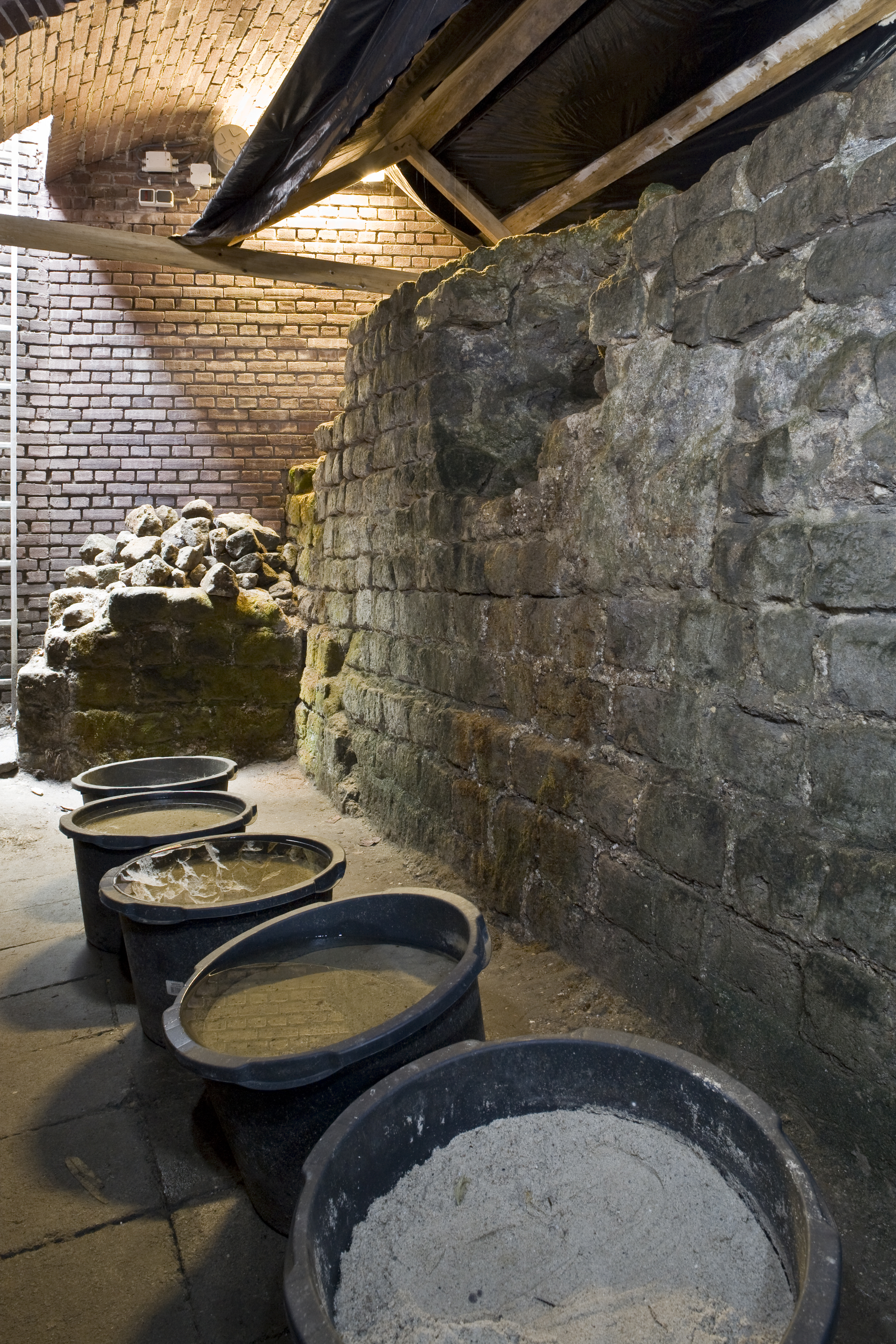
Remains of the fort's wall under the Utrecht Centre for the Arts

== Sources ==
- "Aanleg castellum Traiectum". hetutrechtsarchief.nl (in Dutch). Utrecht: Het Utrechts Archief. Archived from the original on 2013-10-21.
- "History". karelv.nl. Utrecht: Grand Hotel Karel V. Archived from the original on 2013-10-28. This tertiary source reuses information from other sources but does not name them.
- Brunsting, Hendrik (1976). "Traiectum (Utrecht) Netherlands". In Stillwell, Richard; MacDonald, William L.; McAllister, Marian H. (eds.). The Princeton encyclopedia of classical sites. Princeton, NJ: Princeton University Press – via Perseus Digital Library.
- "Utrecht (Domplein) - Traiectum". cultuurwijzer.nl (in Dutch). Collectiewijzer. 2005-01-12. Archived from the original on 2005-03-05.
- van der Sijs, Nicoline (2008) [Print version of this edition published 2002]. "De oudste bronnen voor het Nederlands". 2.1 Het prille begin: Plaatsnamen in Romeinse bronnen, Chronologisch woordenboek, Nicoline van der Sijs. Chronologisch woordenboek : de ouderdom en herkomst van onze woorden en betekenissen (in Dutch) (2nd ed.). Amsterdam [u.a.]: Veen. ISBN 9789020420456. OCLC 246875469. Archived from the original on 2014-07-07 – via Digital Library for Dutch Literature.
