= Karel 5 =

Restaurant in the Netherlands

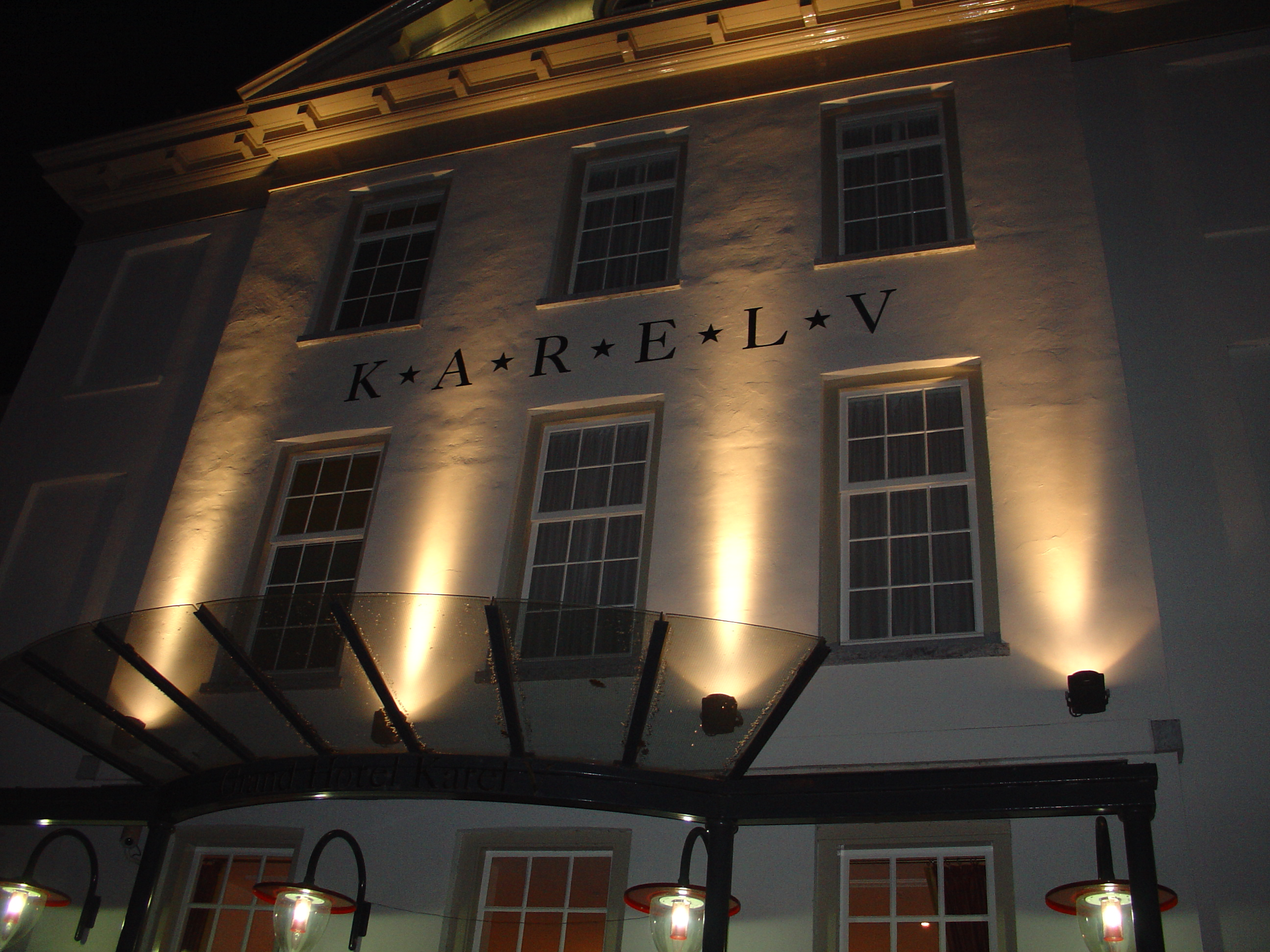

Restaurant information
- Established: 2020
- Head chef: Leon Mazairac
- Rating: Michelin Guide
- Location: Utrecht, Netherlands
- Seating capacity: 80
- Website: Official website

Karel 5 is a restaurant in the Grand Hotel Karel V in Utrecht, the Netherlands. The restaurant was awarded a Michelin star in 2023. Head chef is Leon Mazairac. In the past Restaurant Karel 5 was located in this hotel. That restaurant opened in 1999 and held a Michelin star from 2005 to 2013 after which it was closed and replaced by a bistro.

== See also ==
- List of Michelin-starred restaurants in the Netherlands
