= Restaurant Karel 5 =

Coordinates: 52°5′16.34″N 5°7′6.2″E

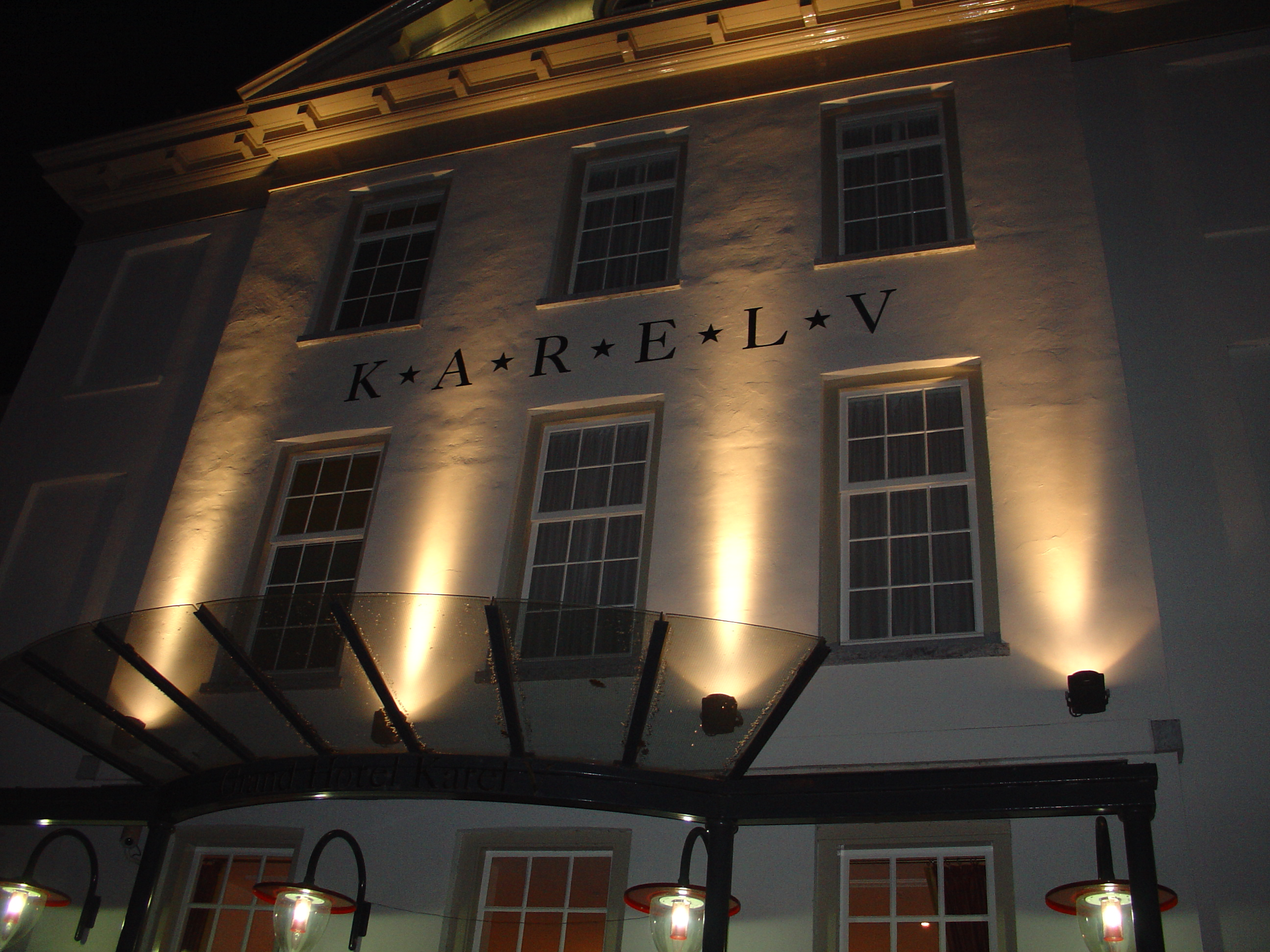
- Interactive map of Restaurant Karel 5

Restaurant information
- Established: 1999
- Head chef: Vito Reekens
- Rating: Michelin Guide
- Location: Geertebolwerk 1, Utrecht, 3511 XA, Netherlands
- Website: Official website

Restaurant Karel 5 (formerly known as Grand Restaurant Karel V) was a restaurant, located in the Grand Hotel Karel V in Utrecht, Netherlands. It is a fine dining restaurant that was awarded one Michelin star in the period 2005–2013.

In 2013, GaultMillau awarded the restaurant 14 out of 20 points.

Head chef of the restaurant was Vito Reekers, who took over in 2013. Head chefs in the time of the Michelin stars were Jerry Bastiaan (2005-2007) and Jeroen Robberegt (2007-2013). A new restaurant Karel 5, under chef Leon Mazairac, was awarded a star in 2023.

== History ==
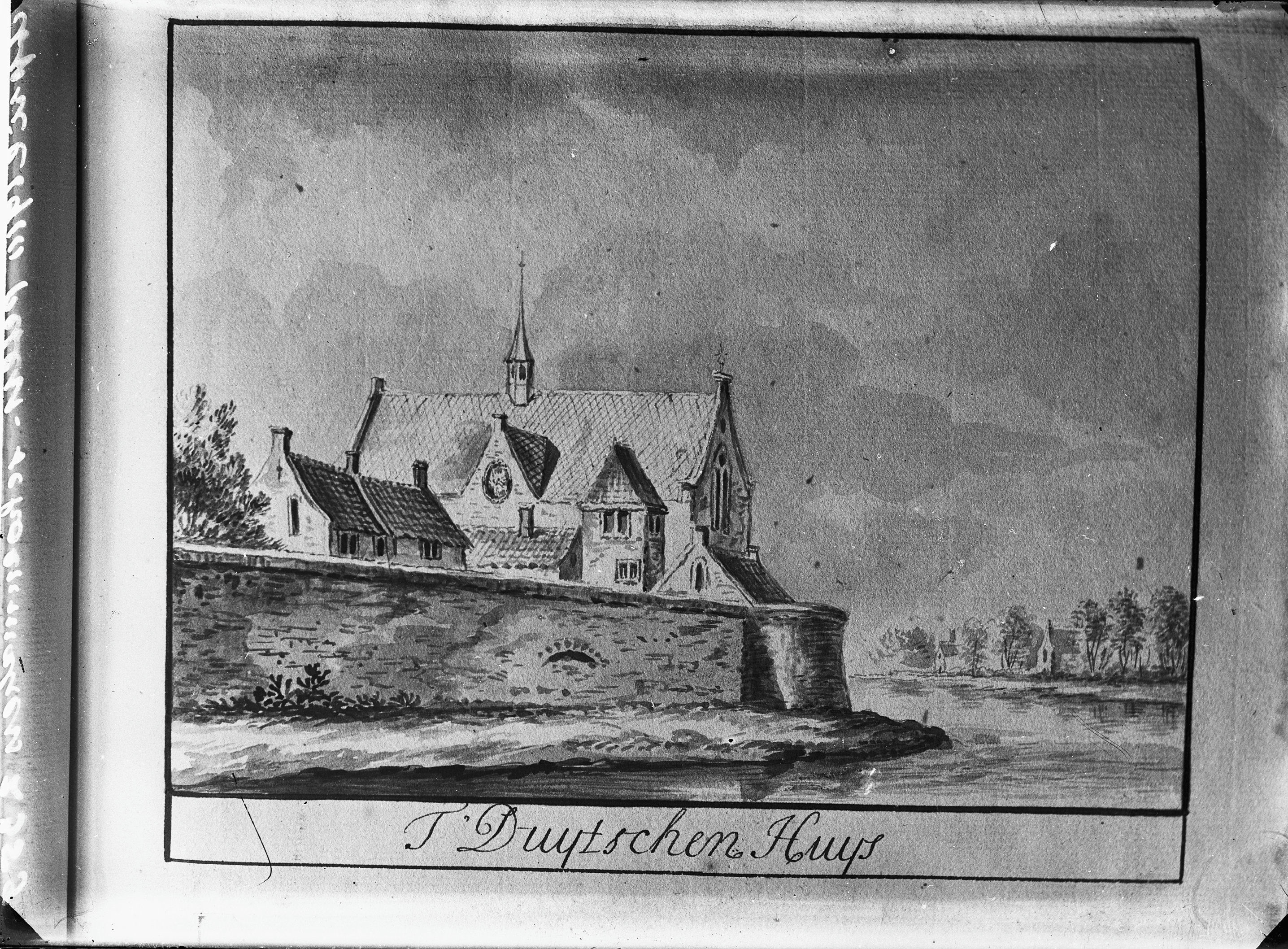
Duitse Huis (German House)

The restaurant and hotel are located in a centuries-old building, named "Duitse Huis". It got its name from the "Hospitaalorde van St.-Marie der Duitsers", known as the Teutonic Knights, that was based here. The monastery was built in 1348. The Knights stayed there till the Napoleonic era when they sold the building. It was then converted into a Military hospital. As such, it served till 1990. After an extensive renovation, the Teutonic Knights returned in 1995 to a part of the complex. The rest was converted into a hotel which opened in 1999. The complex is a Rijksmonument.

== See also ==
- List of Michelin starred restaurants in the Netherlands
