= Theodor Hirsch =

German historian (1806–1881)

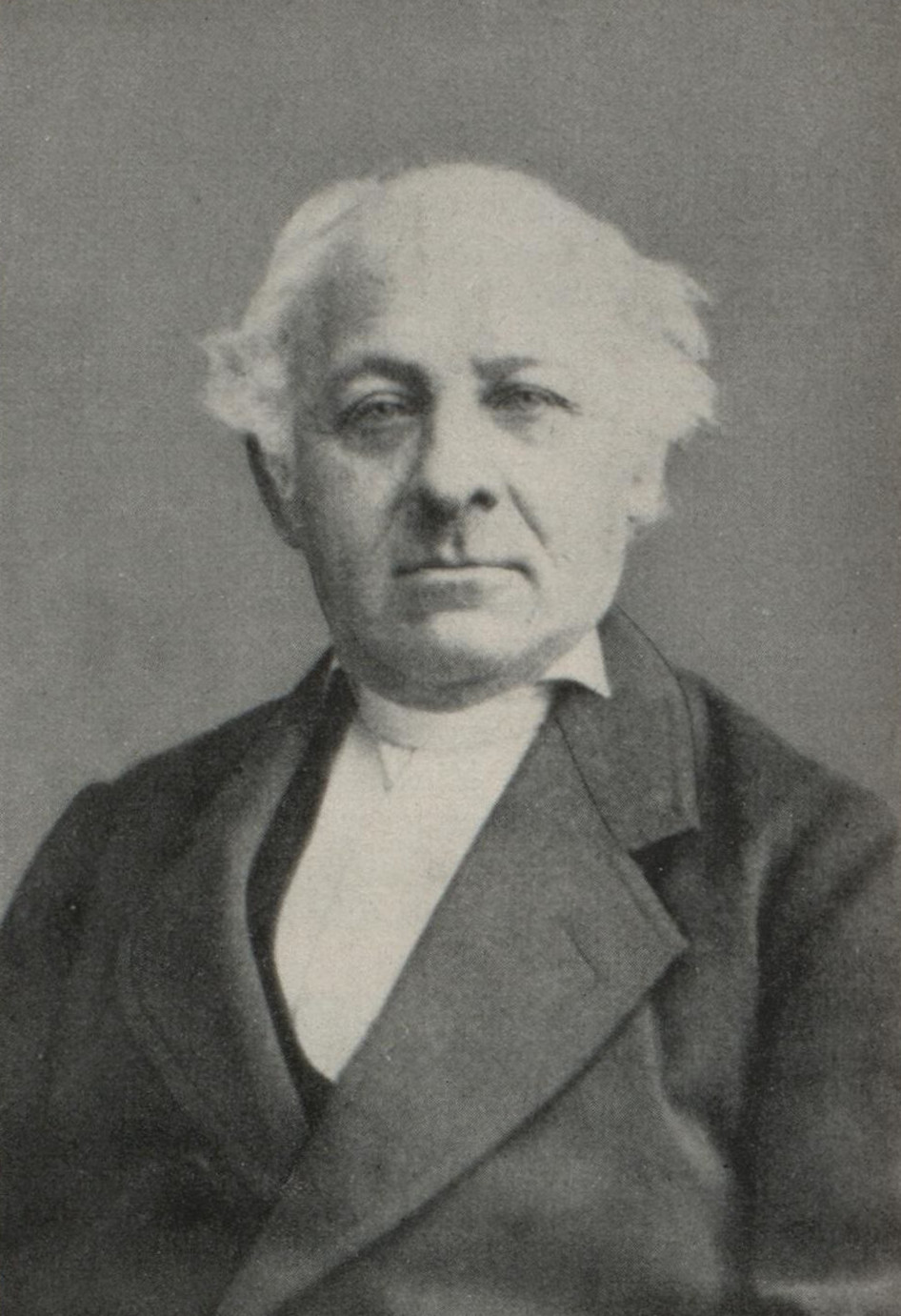
Image of Hirsch Theodor

Theodor Hirsch (17 December 1806 – 17 February 1881) was a German historian who was a native of Altschottland, Danzig. He was a cousin to historian Siegfried Hirsch (1816-1860).

== Life and career ==
Born Jewish, he converted to Christianity and studied history and theology at Berlin, and in 1833 became a teacher at a secondary school in Danzig, where he would teach history for the next 32 years. At Danzig he focused on the local history of the city, and in 1850 was responsible for re-arrangement and supervision of the municipal archives. In 1865 Hirsch became an associate professor at the University of Greifswald and director of Greifswald University Library.

== Works ==
In 1858 he published one of his better known works, Danzig's Handels- und Gewerbegeschichte Unter der Herrschaft des Deutschen Ordens (Danzig's Commercial and Industrial History under the Reign of the Teutonic Order). With Ernst Strehlke (1834-1869) and Max Töppen (1822-1893), he edited Scriptores Rerum Prussicarum, a scholarly five-volume work on early Prussian history.
