= Hermann Pabst =

German historian (1842–1870)

Hermann Pabst (4 January 1842 – 16 August 1870) was a German historian who was a native of Burg bei Magdeburg in the Province of Saxony.

He initially studied philology at the University of Bonn, where one of his instructors was Friedrich Wilhelm Ritschl (1806-1876). Afterwards he studied history under Georg Waitz (1813-1886) at the University of Göttingen. In 1864 he earned his doctorate at the University of Berlin, and two years later obtained his habilitation. He later performed historical research in Siena and Rome. As a combatant during the Franco-Prussian War, he was killed in the Battle of Mars-la-Tour on 16 August 1870 at the age of 28.

Pabst was the author of Geschichte des langobardischen Herzogthums (History of the Lombard Duchies) (1862), and edited the second volume of Siegfried Hirsch's Jahrbücher des Deutschen Reichs unter Heinrich II (Annals of the German Empire under Henry II).
