= Grand Hotel Karel V =

Hotel in Utrecht, Netherlands

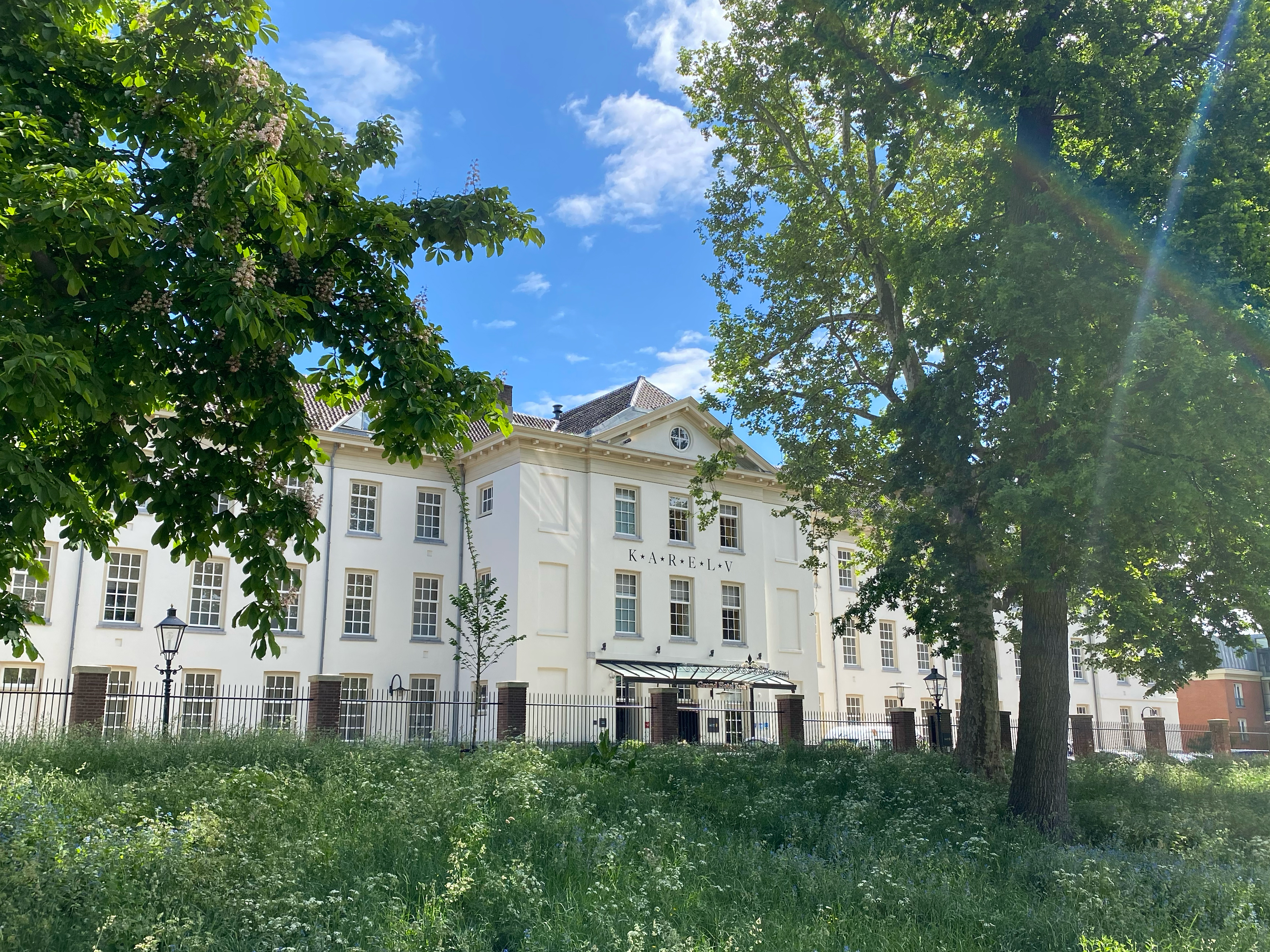

- Location within Netherlands

General information
- Status: Open
- Location: Geertebolwerk 1, 3511 XA Utrecht, Utrecht, Netherlands
- Coordinates: 52.087872°N 5.118389°E
- Opened: 1999
- Renovated: 1992–1999
- Landlord: Bailiwick of Utrecht

Technical details
- Floor count: 3

Other information
- Number of rooms: 121
- Number of restaurants: 2
- Number of bars: 1

Website
- www.karelv.nl/en/home/

The Grand Hotel Karel V is a hotel in Utrecht, Netherlands. It is located in the Duitse Huis complex of buildings, including part of the old monastery of the Bailiwick of Utrecht of the Teutonic Knights founded in 1348. Most of the rooms and suites are in a former military hospital, which dates from 1823 and has been carefully renovated, or in the modern Roman wing opened in 2008. The hotel contains a Roman-themed health center, conference rooms, a bar, brasserie and the Grand Restaurant Karel V. It is set in extensive grounds.

== Building history ==
In 1348 the Bailiwick of Utrecht of the noble Teutonic Order (Ridderlijke Duitse Orde Balije van Utrecht) built the Duitse Huis as a monastery and headquarters between the Utrecht city wall and Springweg. In the sixteenth century, Charles the Fifth (Karl V), who was emperor of the German Empire, king of Spain and sovereign ruler of the seventeen Netherlands' provinces, stayed at this monastery which by then also served as a hospital. By 1580, when the Reformation was introduced in Utrecht, the Teutonic Order converted to Protestantism but it maintained the building as a hospital. Napoleon's brother Louis Bonaparte bought the property in 1807 and the Teutonic Order left the premises. During the reign of King William I of the Netherlands a military hospital was built on the property along the Geertebolwerk. For its time, the hospital was very modern. It was completed in 1823.

When the hospital became vacant in the late 1980s the Bailiwick of Utrecht was able to repurchase the property. A major renovation was started in 1992. In 1995 the Bailiwick of Utrecht moved back into the 15th century Commander's house on the corner of Springweg and Walsteeg. Further renovations converted much of the rest of the complex into a hotel and restaurant by 1999. The building was restored with help from the National Restoration Fund. The hospital's wards were converted into hotel rooms and suites. As far as possible the old fabric and appearance were preserved.

The garden wing was renovated and extended in 2007. During the excavation archaeologists discovered the remains of a Roman cemetery dating to between 40 BC and 275 AD, which may be associated with the Roman fort of Traiectum. The wing was called the Roman wing after this discovery. The Roman Wing is called "contemporary" by reviewers, in contrast to the "cleverly modernized" main building. It was designed by the Heine & van de Rijt architectural firm and Hylkema Consultants. The wing has a modern pavilion and extension of the existing garden wing. It was formally opened in November 2008 with a ceremony that included marching Roman soldiers.

== Facilities ==
The Grand Hotel Karel V opened in 1999. It is named after the Emperor Charles V, who once visited the Duitse Huis. A formal opening ceremony with the mayor of Utrecht and a representative of the queen was held on 10 September 2000. At this ceremony the hotel received its five star rating, the first in the Utrecht region. The hotel has 121 rooms, conference rooms, a health center, bar, bistro and restaurant. The auditorium seats 114 people. There is an unobtrusive sound system in the conference facility and public areas of the hotel.

The hotel has three wings. The Medieval Wing is in the center, the Napoleonic Wing to the west and the Roman Wing to the south. The "wellness center" in the basement of the Roman wing has a "Roman" motif, with a sauna, steam room and swimming pool. Some of the finds from Roman times are exhibited in the wing. Traces of the past history of the complex, including objects, photographs and historical drawings, are displayed throughout the hotel. The hotel is set in extensive gardens.

== Restaurants ==
Bistro Karel 5 is in the former convent kitchen, and has a terrace that is open in good weather. The chapter room and refectory of the main building of the medieval Duitse Huis are now also dining areas. The remains of a fireplace were found during the renovation on which the double-headed eagle, the emblem of Charles V, was engraved in sandstone. A new fireplace was built in the refectory in the same place as the old fireplace, decorated with the coat of arms and motto of the Emperor Charles V.

A 2004 guide said the Bistro Karel 5 could be enjoyed in a casual atmosphere, and the classic Restaurant Karel 5 offered an excellent choice. Restaurant Karel 5 received a Michelin star in 2005, but lost it in 2013 after a change in chefs. (Note: Jerry Bastiaan joined the hotel in 2004 and was head chef from 2005 to 2007, when he left for a job in Dubai. Bastiaan was succeeded by Jeroen Robberegt, who left the hotel effective June 2013 to work as executive chef of the Miele Culinary Institute in Vianen. Robberegt was replaced by Vito Reekers, former sous-chef under Robberegt.) Restaurant Karel 5 held the star in the period 2005–2013. As of June 2014 Gault Millau showed the restaurant rating as 14 points.

== Sources ==
- Berkmoes, Ryan Ver; Zimmerman, Karla (2013-04-01). Lonely Planet The Netherlands. Lonely Planet. ISBN 978-1-74321-634-7.
- "Boek over Ridderlijke Duitsche Orde in Balije Utrecht". dichtbij. 26 June 2012.
- Boer, Ellen (2013-03-15). Grand Tourist. Xlibris Corporation. ISBN 978-1-4836-0306-3.
- "Bose Professional Systems Division Success Story - Grand Hotel Karel V, Utrecht" (PDF). Bose. Archived from the original (PDF) on 2013-05-20.
- "Duitse Huis". International Chamber Music Festival Utrecht.
- Dunford, Martin (2010-03-01). The Rough Guide to The Netherlands. Rough Guides. ISBN 978-1-4053-9205-1.
- Dunford, Martin (2013-04-25). Zuid-Holland and Utrecht Rough Guides Snapshot Netherlands (includes Leiden, Den Haag, Delft, Rotterdam, Gouda, Dordrecht and Utrecht). Rough Guides. ISBN 978-1-4093-3573-3.
- Dunlop, S. (2004). ANWB Veldgids Sterren kijken. ANWB Media - Boeken & Gidsen. ISBN 978-90-18-02118-4.
- Graaf, L.B. (2007). Gedragen beleid. Eburon Uitgeverij B.V. ISBN 978-90-5972-183-8.
- "Grand Hotel Karel V - archipedia".
- "Grand Hotel Karel V". weekendjeweg.
- "Grand Restaurant Karel V – Utrecht". Gault Millau. Archived from the original on 2014-06-19.
- "Het Duitse Huis, een kloostergebouw vol geschiedenis". Gemeente Utrecht.
- "History". Grand Hotel Karel V.
- "Jeroen Robberegt* van Karel V naar Miele". Misset Horeca. 28 March 2013.
- Kok, Richard (8 June 2007). "Jerry Bastiaan vertrekt naar Dubai" [Jerry Bastiaans leaves for Dubai]. Misset Horeca (in Dutch).
- "Karel V verliest Michelinster". de Week krant Stadsblad Utrecht. 27 November 2013.
- Kerkhoff, Jacqueline (2008). Maria van Hongarije en haar hof 1505–1558: tot plichtsbetrachting uitverkoren. Uitgeverij Verloren. ISBN 978-90-6550-941-3.
- Klimczuk, Stephen; Warner, Gerald (2009). Secret Places, Hidden Sanctuaries: Uncovering Mysterious Sights and Societies. Sterling Publishing Company, Inc. ISBN 978-1-4027-6207-9.
- Mol, Johannes A.; Militzer, Klaus; Nicholson, Helen J. (2006). The Military Orders and the Reformation: Choices, State Building, and the Weight of Tradition. Uitgeverij Verloren. ISBN 90-6550-913-5.
