= Jacob Taets van Amerongen =

Teutonic Knights commander (1542–1612)

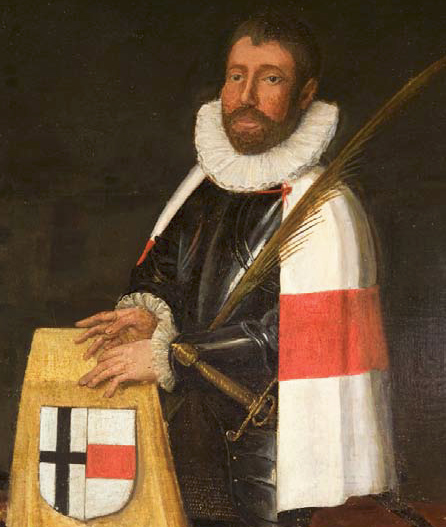
- Jacob Taets van Amerongen, detail from a panel in the Duitse Huis
- Born: 1542
- Died: 4 December 1612
- Occupation: Knight
- Known for: Land commander of the Teutonic Knights

Coat of arms of the Taets van Amerongen family

Jacob Taets van Amerongen (1542 – 4 December 1612) was a land commander of the Utrecht-based order of Teutonic Knights in what are now the Netherlands. He made the pilgrimage to the Holy Land as a young man. He became commander of the order at a time when Protestants were gaining control of northern Europe. He managed to resist demands to dissolve the order and use its property for charity. Soon after his death the order became a Protestant organization.

== Early years ==
Jacob Taets van Amerongen was the eldest son of Johan Taets van Amerongen, lord of Groenewoude (died 18 January 1589) and Johanna van Gaesbeek (died 26 February 1578). Both his father and his grandfather, Ernst Taets van Amerongen (died 1565), had served as burgomasters of the city of Utrecht. Other relatives were senior clergymen. Jacob Taets van Amerongen studied in Louvain (1560), Orleans (1565) and Pavia (1568).

Jacob Taets left on 1569 for a pilgrimage to the Holy Land, as his great-uncle Anthonis and great-great-grandfather Ernst (died 1473) had done. According to the German knight Hans von Hirnheim, he landed in Jaffa on 30 August 1569. In 1572 Jacob Taets joined the Natio Germanica at the University of Padua, a lawyer's association. He belonged to the Jerusalem confraternity, whose members planned or had undertaken a pilgrimage to the Holy Land. He also belonged to the Kleine Kalende confraternity, an exclusive society in Utrecht that in theory was restricted to the nobility.

== Teutonic Order ==
Jacob Taets was appointed house commander of the Teutonic Knights' Bailiwick of Utrecht on 20 May 1576, managing the order's household officials, servants and stores, and leading the order in the absence of the land commander. Under his leadership the convent church employed three secular priests, a sacristan, a chantry priest, a sexton, four choristers and an organist. The services were held frequently, followed traditional practices such as foot-washing for the poor on Maundy Thursdays, and were fully attended. In October 1579 Taets became land commander. He succeeded Frans van der Loe.

Taets tried to restore the order to its former religious nature, and to confirm the allegiance of the Utrecht bailiwick to the Emperor and the Deutschmeister. Taets resisted demands by the States of Utrecht that Catholic institutions be dissolved and their goods used for charity. In 1580 he argued that the goods "belonged to our Lord the German Master", and that the Bailiwick was a knightly institution that served "where necessary to fight with weapons for the defence of the Empire against our common arch enemy, the Turk..." In 1594 Taets sent two knights from Utrecht to Bad Mergentheim to join brothers from the Alden Biesen bailiwick in a crusade to defend the Holy Roman Empire against the Ottoman Empire.

Jacob Taets van Amerongen remained land commander until his death in 1612. He died 4 December 1612. He was succeeded by Diderick de Belois van Treslong. Soon after, the Teutonic Knights became a Protestant organization.

== Portrait ==
A portrait of Taets van Amerongen appears on the seventh panel of a series held in the Duitse Huis that depicts all the land commanders of the order from 1239. He in fact commissioned the series of portraits between May 1576, when he took office, and March 1580, when the last panel was damaged in the Beeldenstorm. His body and head were painted by different artists. He is the only commander to be shown with the signs of having made the pilgrimage to Jerusalem, although one would expect that others would have done so. This may be because Taets van Amerongen commissioned the work and therefore influenced what was represented. He may have been deliberately showing the connection with the traditional Teutonic Order, founded during the crusades in the Holy Land.
