= Duitse Huis =

Historic site in Utrecht, Netherlands

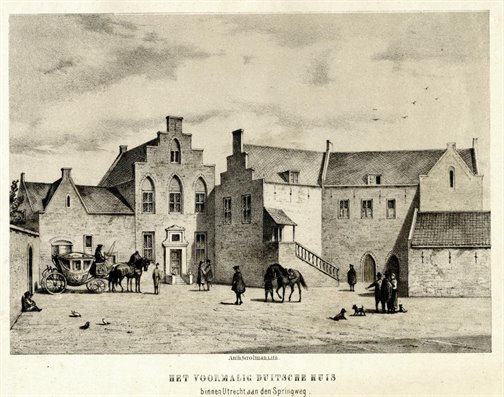
- View of the buildings on the Springweg from a drawing c. 1720 by Abraham Rademaker

- Location within Netherlands

General information
- Location: Utrecht, Netherlands
- Coordinates: 52.087972°N 5.118495°E
- Current tenants: Teutonic Knights; Grand Hotel Karel V
- Construction started: 1348
- Renovated: 1992-95
- Owner: Teutonic Knights

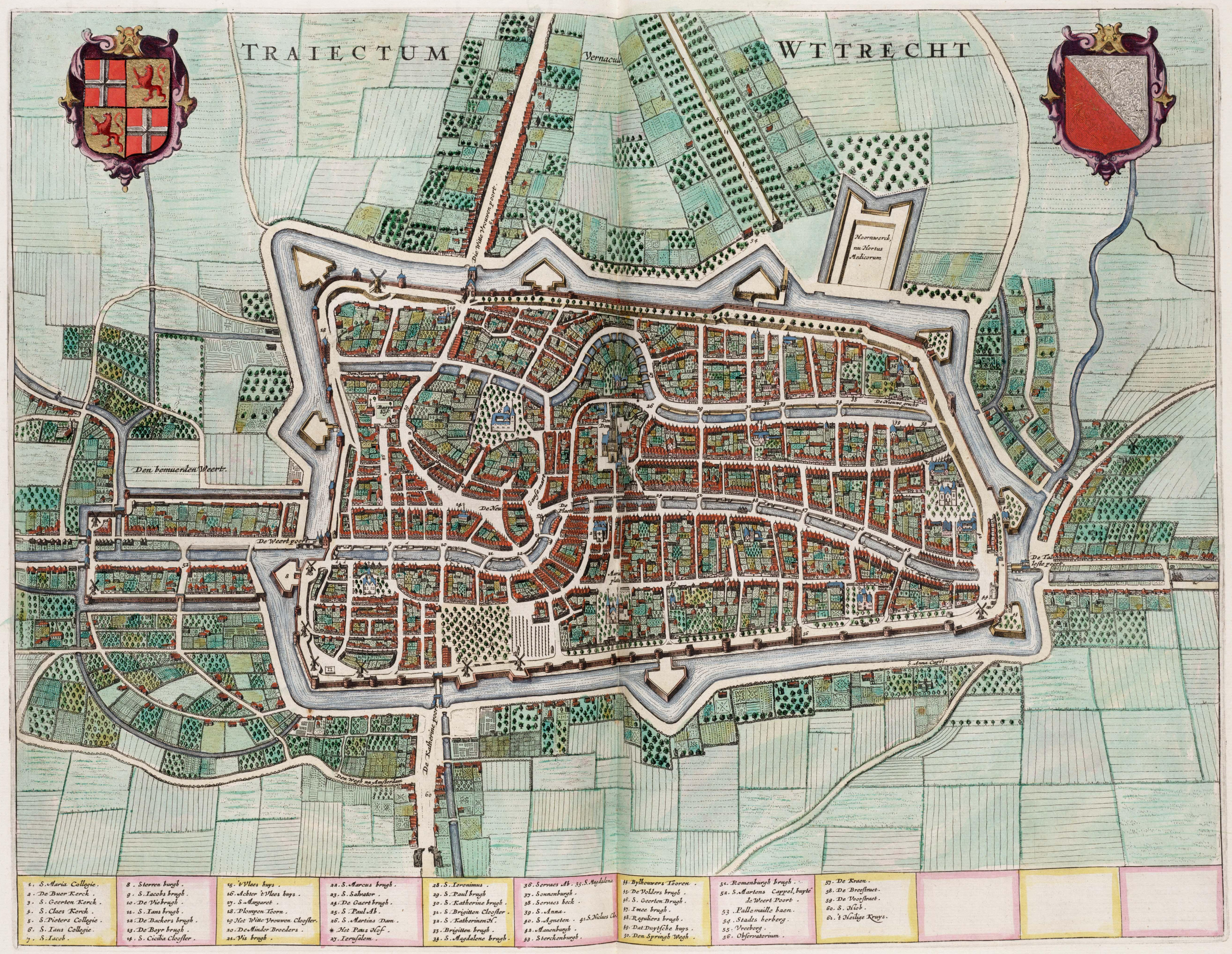
1649 map of Utrecht. Duitse Huis is just above the bastion protruding from the center of the city wall towards the foot of the map.

The Duitse Huis (English: Teutonic House) is a complex of buildings in the city of Utrecht, Netherlands, protected as a national monument. The older parts date to a monastery of the Bailiwick of Utrecht of the Teutonic Knights founded in 1348. Originally Catholic, the order became Protestant during the Reformation. A military hospital was added in 1823 after the knights had sold the property. The property was sold back to the Bailiwick of Utrecht and a major renovation started in 1992. Some of the older buildings are again the headquarters of the Bailiwick of Utrecht, now a charity, and hold an important collection of medieval manuscripts, coins and pictures. Other buildings, including the former hospital, have been converted into a five-star hotel, the Grand Hotel Karel V.

== Teutonic Order ==
The Teutonic Order was one of the great Christian military orders, along with the Knights Templar and Knights Hospitaller. It was mainly active in the Holy Land and the Baltic region, but had many branches in the west to provide sources of funds and of recruits. The Bailiwick of Utrecht of the Teutonic Order (Ridderlijke Duitse Orde Balije van Utrecht) was founded in 1231, initially focused mainly on the spiritual development of its own members. The order held agricultural lands, called commanderies, in different areas of the Netherlands, The knights and priests had taken the vows of poverty, chastity and obedience. In 1348 the order built the Duitse Huis as a monastery and headquarters between the city wall and Springweg in Utrecht.

The Emperor Charles V (1500-1558) visited Utrecht between 30 December 1545 and 3 February 1546. A meeting of the chapter of the order of the Golden Fleece began on 2 January 1546, attended by Charles V and his sister Mary of Hungary (governor of the Netherlands). Kings Henry VIII of England and Francis I of France, both knights of the order, were present at this important event. The meetings of the chapter and the feasts took place in the Duitse Huis.

By 1580 the States of Utrecht were demanding that Catholic institutions such as the Bailiwick be dissolved and their goods used for charity. The land commander in 1579–1612, Jacob Taets van Amerongen, resisted on the basis that the goods "belonged to our Lord the German Master", and that the Bailiwick was a knightly institution that served "where necessary to fight with weapons for the defence of the Empire against our common arch enemy, the Turk..." However, in 1637 the knights formally accepted the protection of the United Provinces of the Netherlands. They remained an order of Teutonic Knights, but were no longer Catholic.

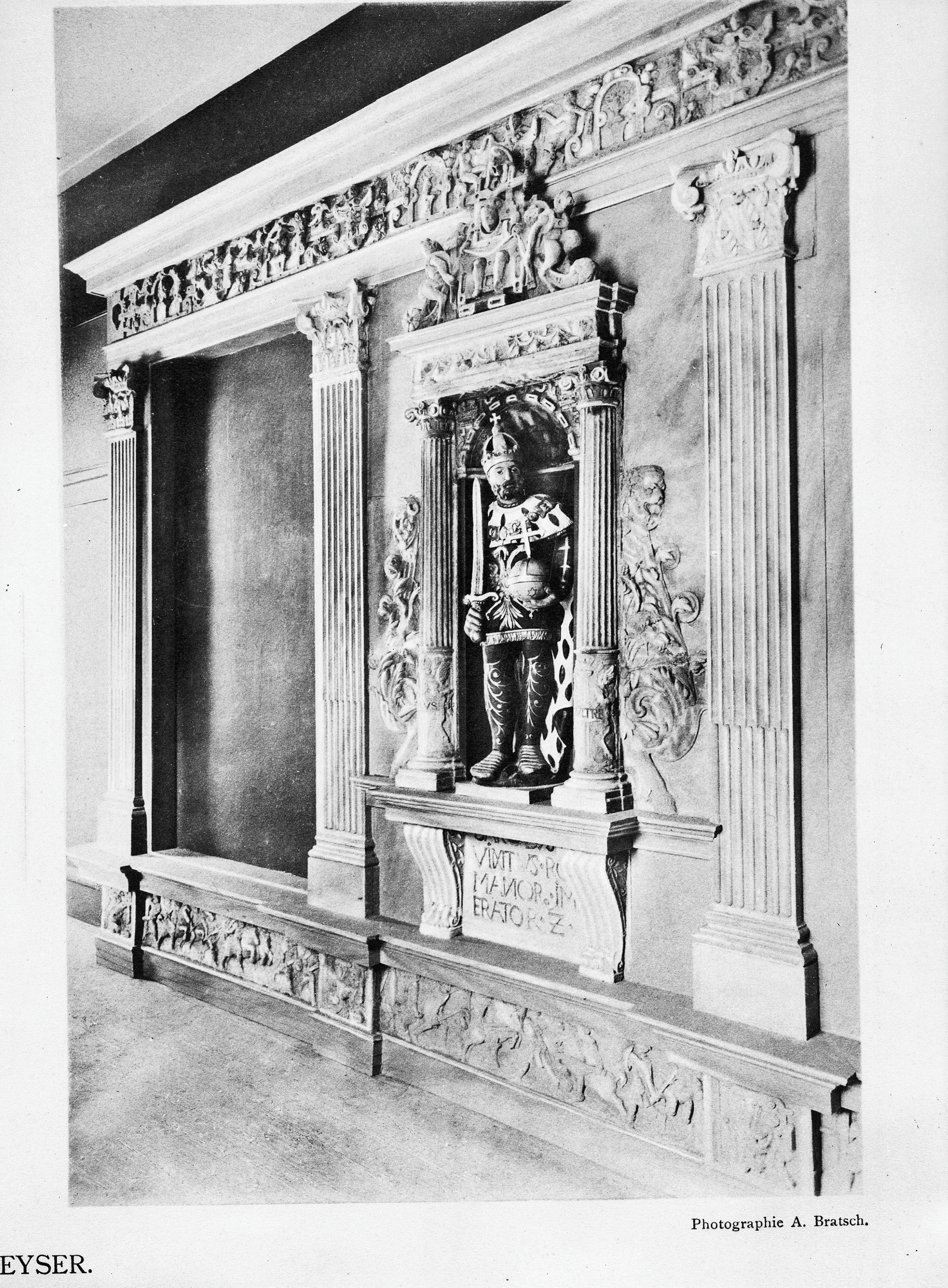
Sculpture of Charles V in wall niche

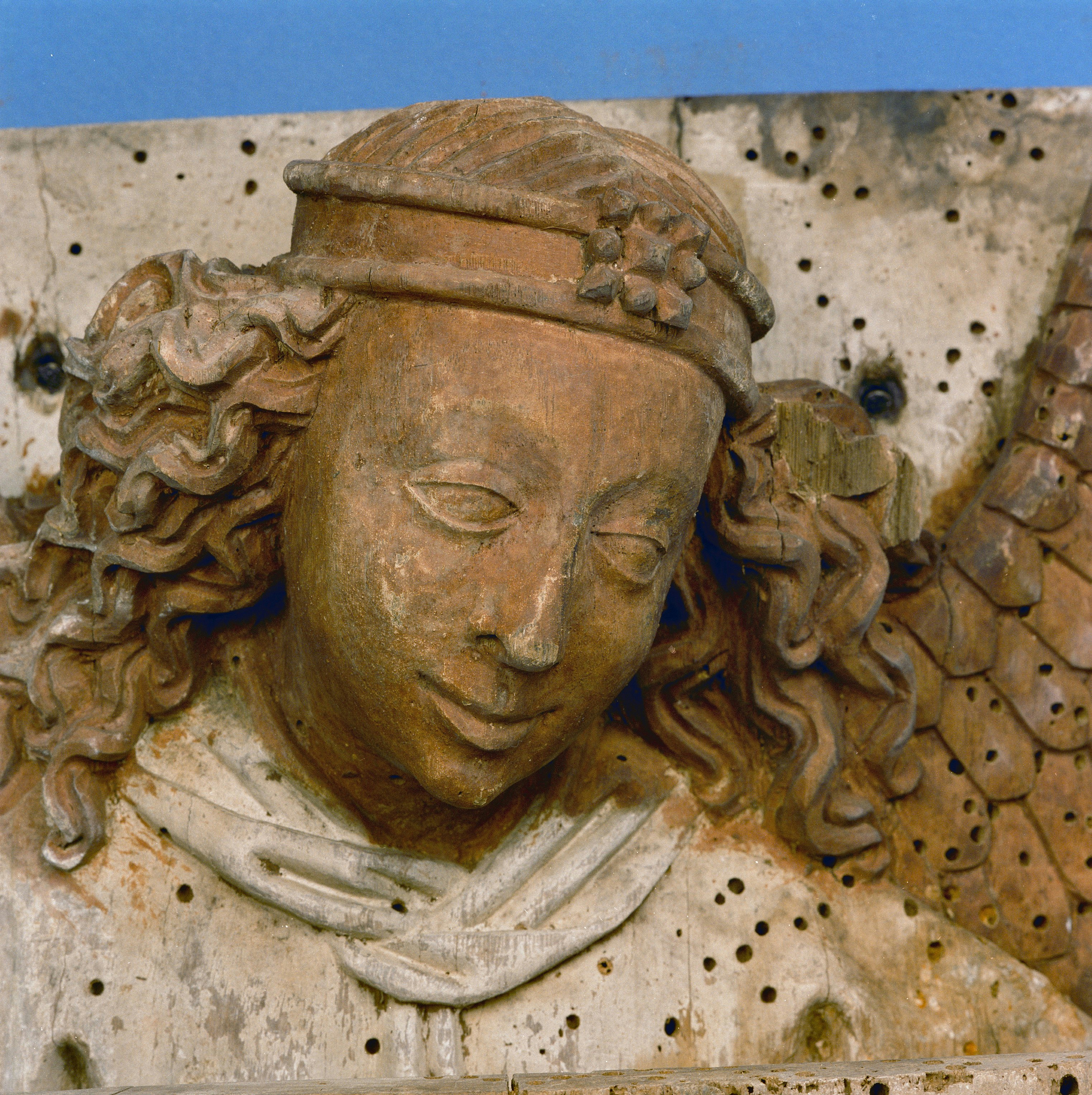
Carved head found in the attic

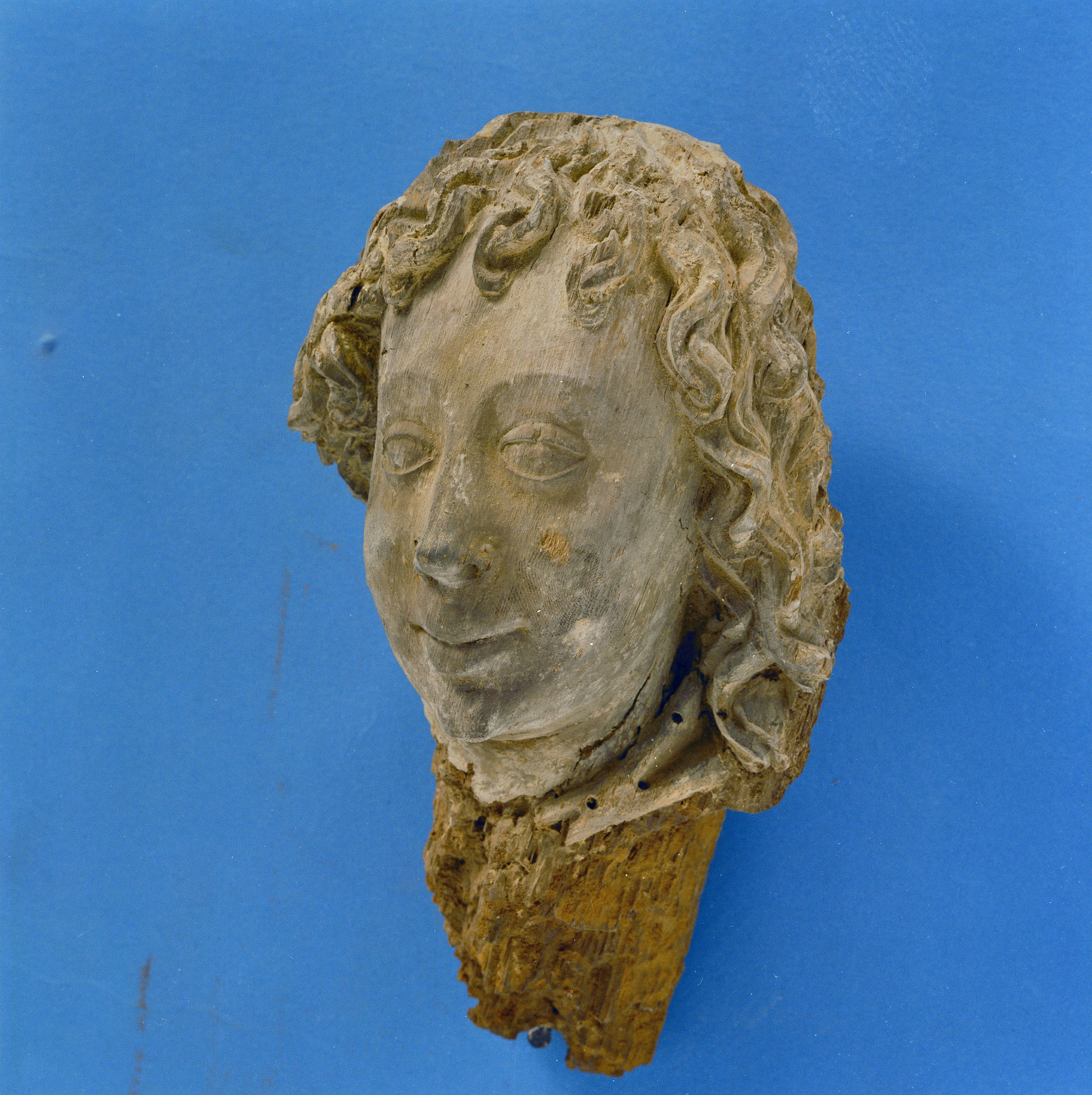
Carved head found in the attic

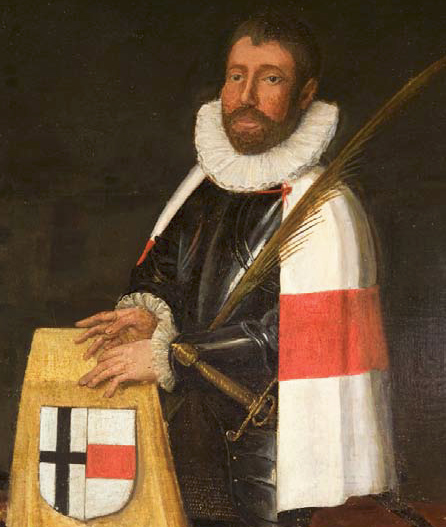
Jacob Taets van Amerongen

== Buildings ==
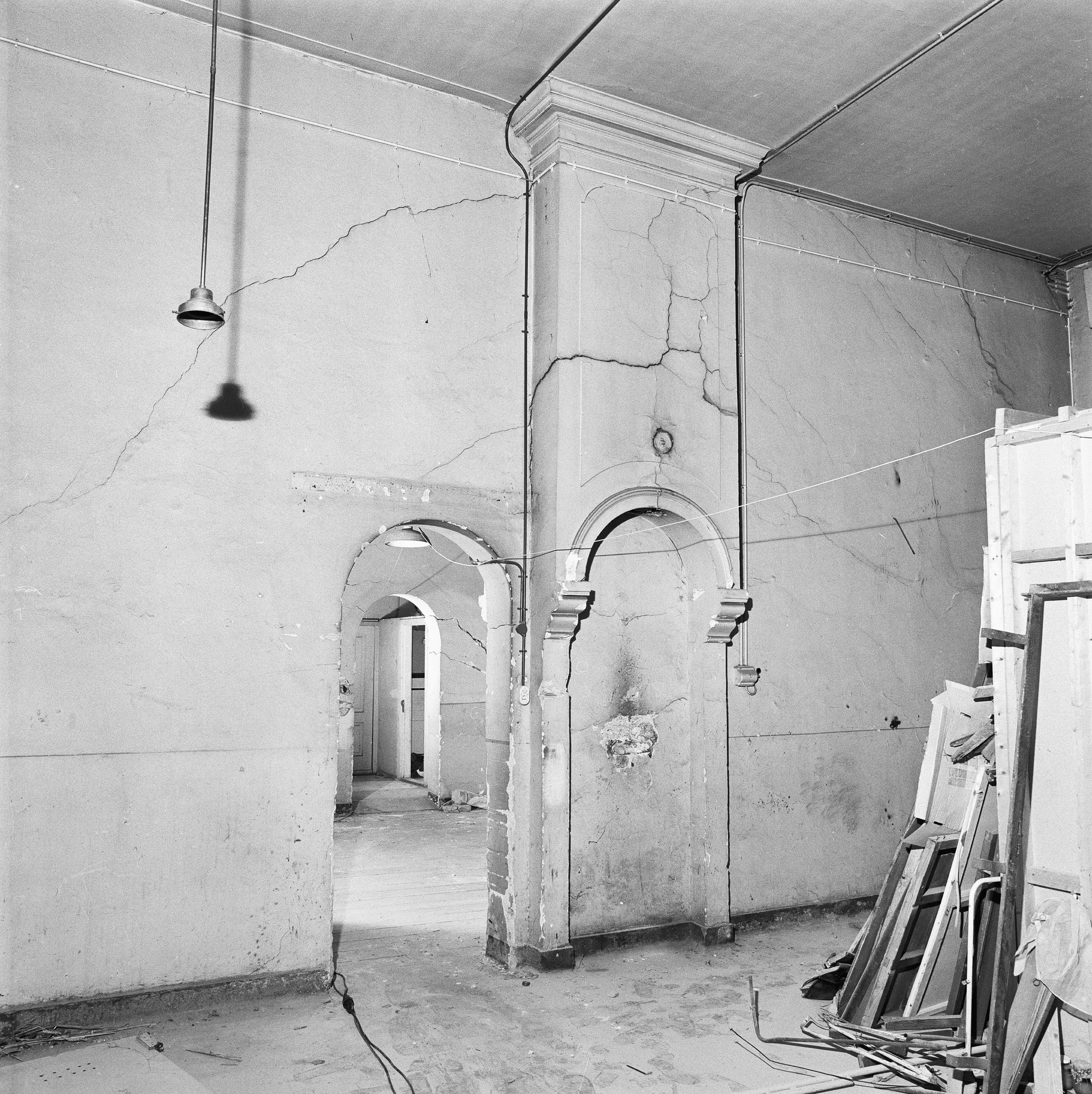
Main building, ground floor, in 1991 before recent renovations

From 17th century drawings it appears that the church was a large building, standing high over its surroundings. Most of the land commanders of the order were buried there, as were prominent citizens of Utrecht. One bay has survived, just over 5.5 metres (18 ft) wide. There were probably seven or eight such bays, and perhaps a small transept. The main building contained the chapter room and the refectory, sometimes called the "Queens room", where the knights ate. Many dignitaries were entertained with elaborate feasts in the refectory. The commander's house, at right angles to the main building, was closed to the public. The commander's room was on the west side of the first floor, and there were two smaller reception rooms to the east of this floor.

The chapter room was renovated in the second half of the 16th century. The work was probably done between 1550 and 1580 to accommodate growing numbers of visiting dignitaries, but may have been undertaken after 1580 due to the ban on public Catholic worship, or in preparation for the 1586 visit by the Calvinist governor-general of the United Provinces, Robert Dudley, 1st Earl of Leicester. The joists above the hall were raised and new corbels were put in. The former Gothic windows were raised and converted to bay windows. The wall posts were moved to give a symmetrical layout with a stone mantelpiece in the center of the north wall. From that date the walls may have been hung with tapestries.

In 1674 the monastery was badly damaged by a windstorm. The church was ruined, and it was demolished. The sacristy, main building, kitchen with outbuildings and Commander's house remained standing. The "knights room" in the commander's house was used as a replacement church. In 1700 the 14th-century facade was truncated.

== Hospital ==
Napoleon's brother Louis Bonaparte bought the property in 1807. The French government planned to convert the complex into a military hospital, and the Teutonic Order had to move to a new building on the canal. On 27 February 1811 the Teutonic Order was abolished in the Kingdom of Holland and its estates were confiscated. After the fall of Napoleon and the restoration of the House of Orange, on 8 August 1815 the Bailiwick was revived by royal decree of William I of the Netherlands. During the reign of King William I a very modern hospital building (for the time) was built on the property along the Geertebolwerk. The hospital was completed in 1823, and remained military property until 1990. The Duitse Huis was registered as a national monument on 20 June 1967. The complex was poorly maintained, and for a few years was occupied by squatters. In 1990 the Military Hospital moved to the Uithof.

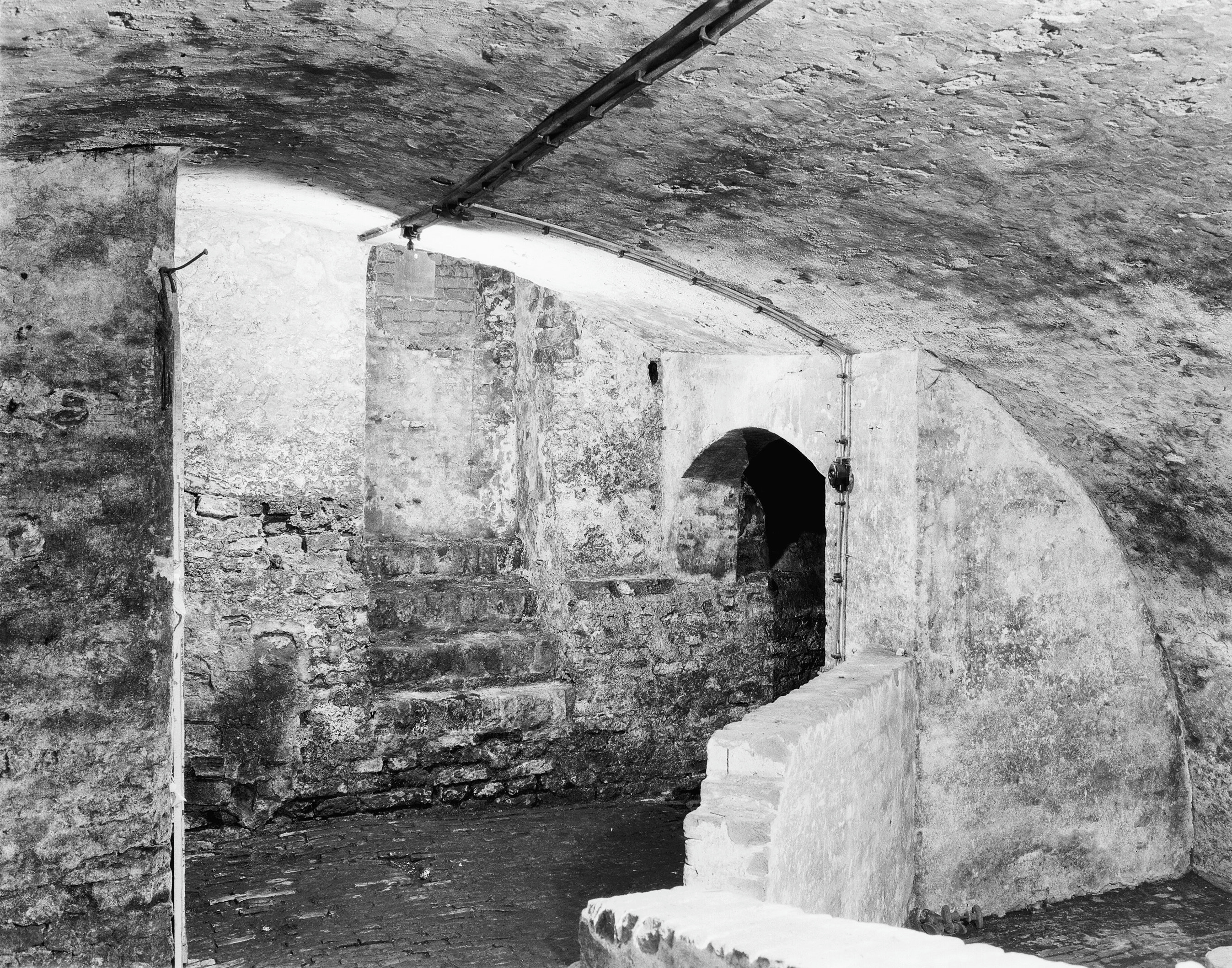
Hospital in 1957

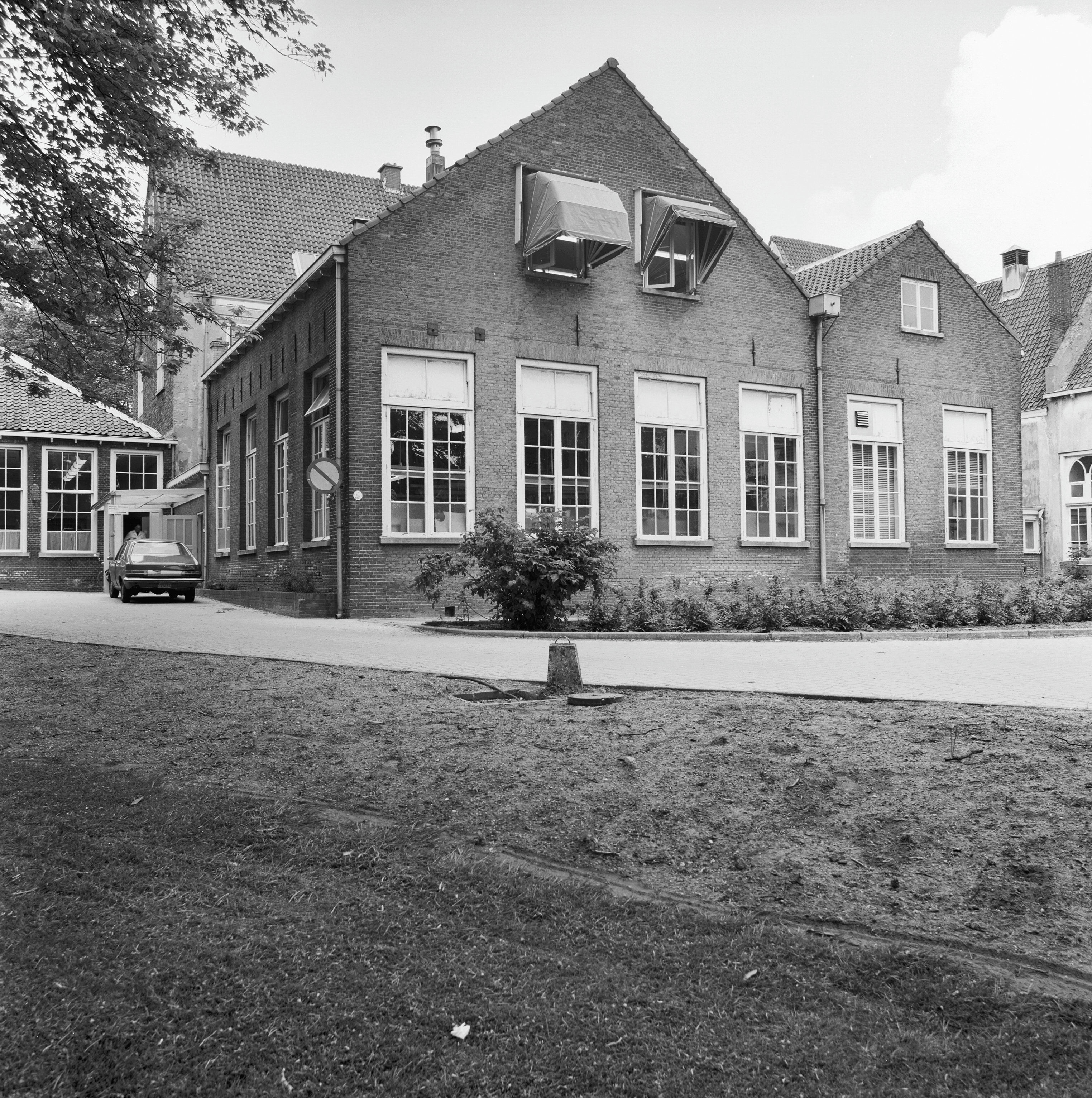
A view of the complex in 1982

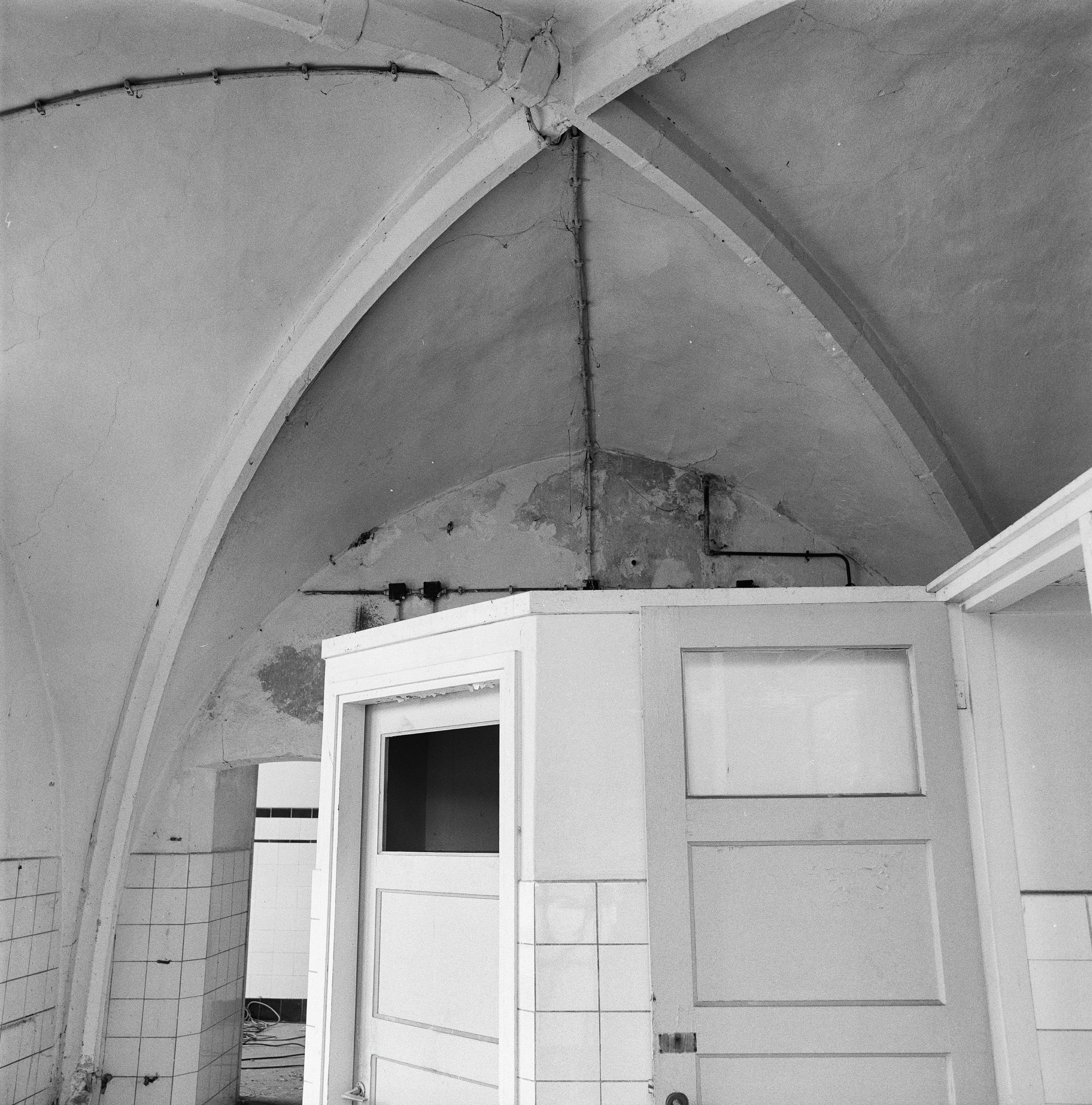
Main building in 1991

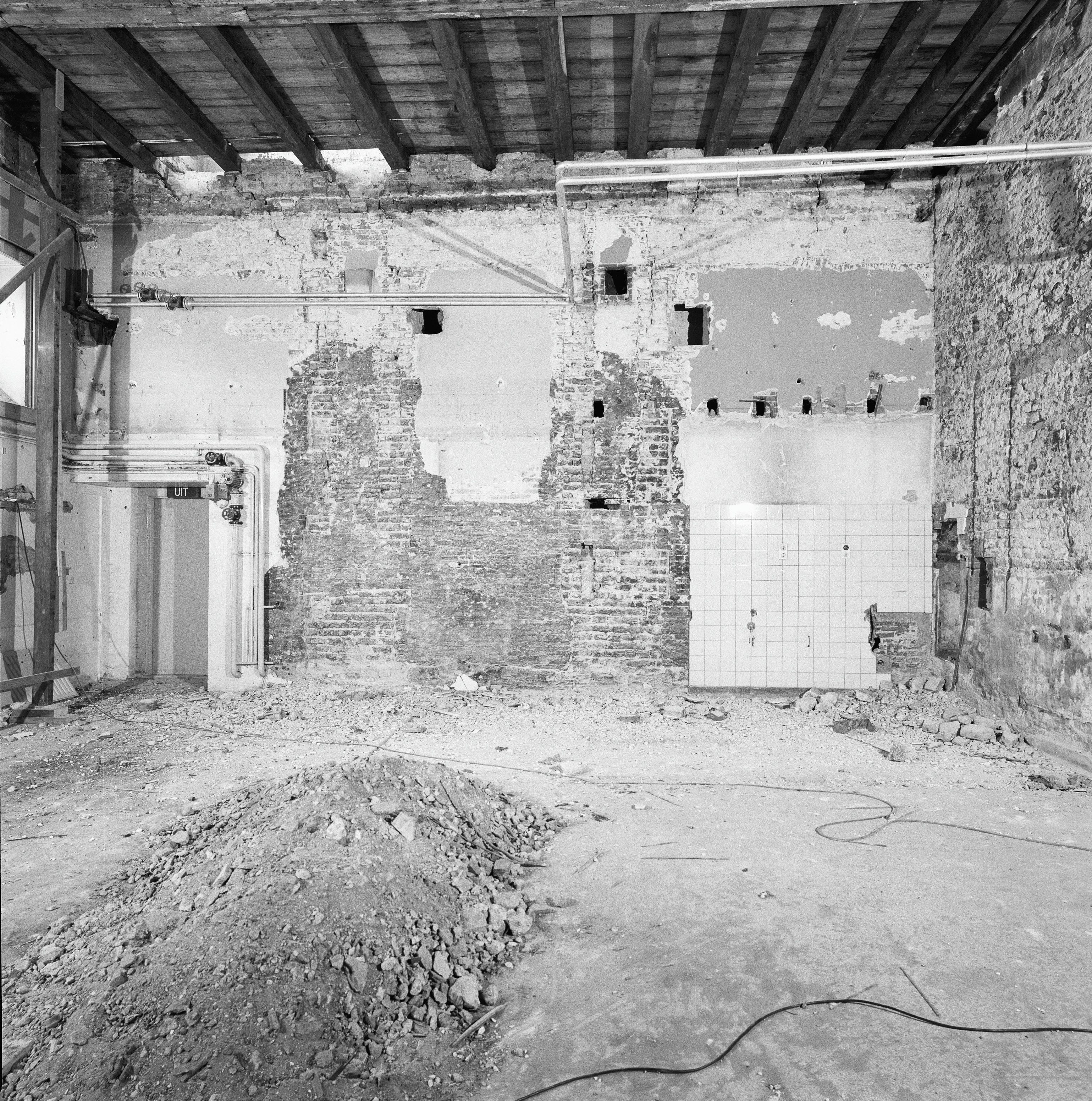
Building III during renovation in 1995

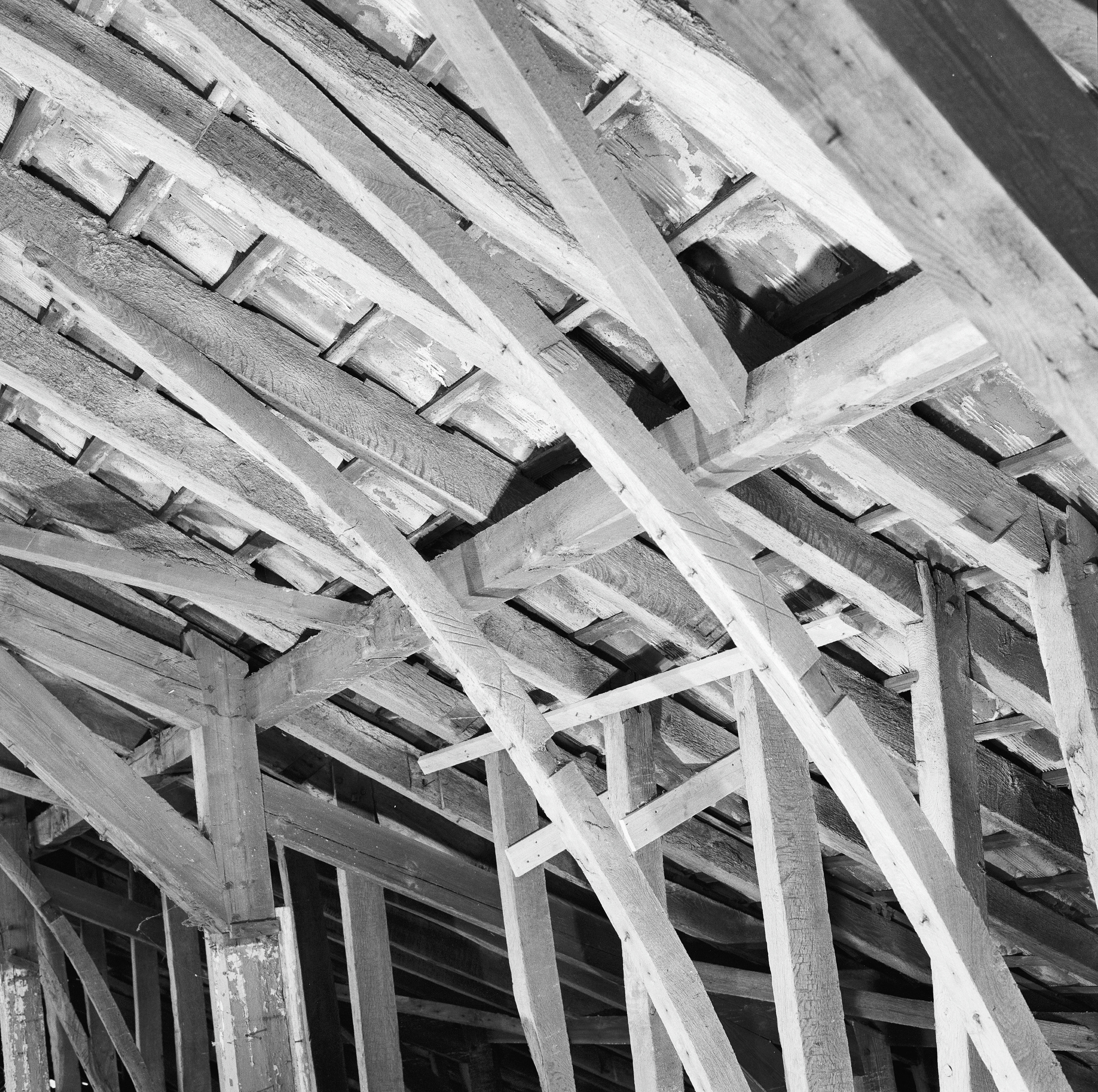
Building V during renovation in 1995

== Recent years ==
=== Bailiwick of Utrecht ===
When the military hospital became vacant in the late 1980s the Bailiwick of Utrecht was able to repurchase the property due to an agreement dating back to 1808. A major renovation was started in 1992. The 14th century facade was restored during the renovation. In 1995 the Bailiwick of Utrecht moved back into the 15th century Commander's house on the corner of Springweg and Walsteeg. The order has become a charity that assists people with disabilities, the homeless and drug addicts.

The Teutonic Order in the Netherlands converted to Calvinism in time, so they were able to preserve their property, including archival records dating back to the start of the 13th century. The Bailiwick of Utrecht has a collection of historical items in the Duitse Huis including many old charters with seals and a collection of medieval coins. The well-preserved archive is open to researchers. The Duitse Huis has several impressive rooms, including the meeting room for the officers of the Bailiwick. The walls have portraits of every Landcommandeur from the order's foundation. All but the most recent are depicted in armor with a mantle over their shoulders. The old buildings, surrounded by tall trees in a fenced area, are an oasis of tranquility in the center of modern Utrecht.

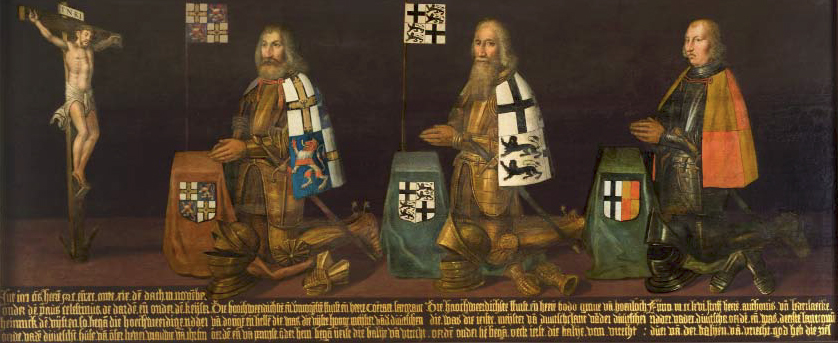
Crucifixion and the first three land commanders of the Bailiwick of Utrecht

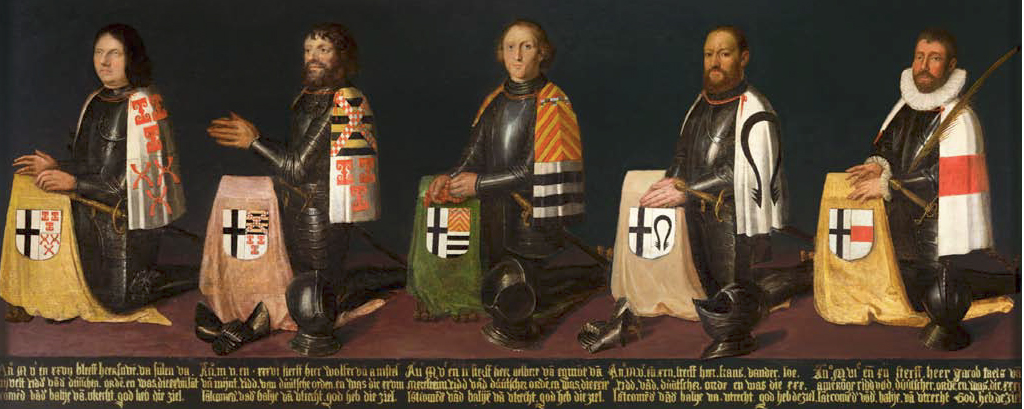
Five land commanders of the Bailiwick of Utrecht, Jacob Taets van Amerongen at far right (ca. 1576-80)

=== Hotel ===
Further renovations converted much of the complex into a hotel. The hospital's wards were converted into hotel rooms and suites. The Grand Hotel Karel V, a five-star hotel, opened in part of the building complex in 1999. The hotel has 121 rooms, conference rooms, a health center, bar, brasserie and restaurant. The former chapter room and former refectory are now dining areas. The remains of a fireplace were found during the renovation on which the double-headed eagle, the emblem of Charles V, was engraved in sandstone. A new fireplace has been built in the same place in the former refectory as the old fireplace with the coat of arms and motto of Charles V.

During the restoration archaeologists discovered the remains of a Roman cemetery dating to between 40 BC and 275 AD. This may be associated with the Roman fort of Traiectum. The garden wing was renovated and extended in 2007 and renamed the Roman wing after this discovery. There are traces of the past history of the complex including objects, photographs and historical drawings displayed in locations throughout the hotel.
