= Cohors II Hispanorum peditata =

cohors II Hispanorum peditata
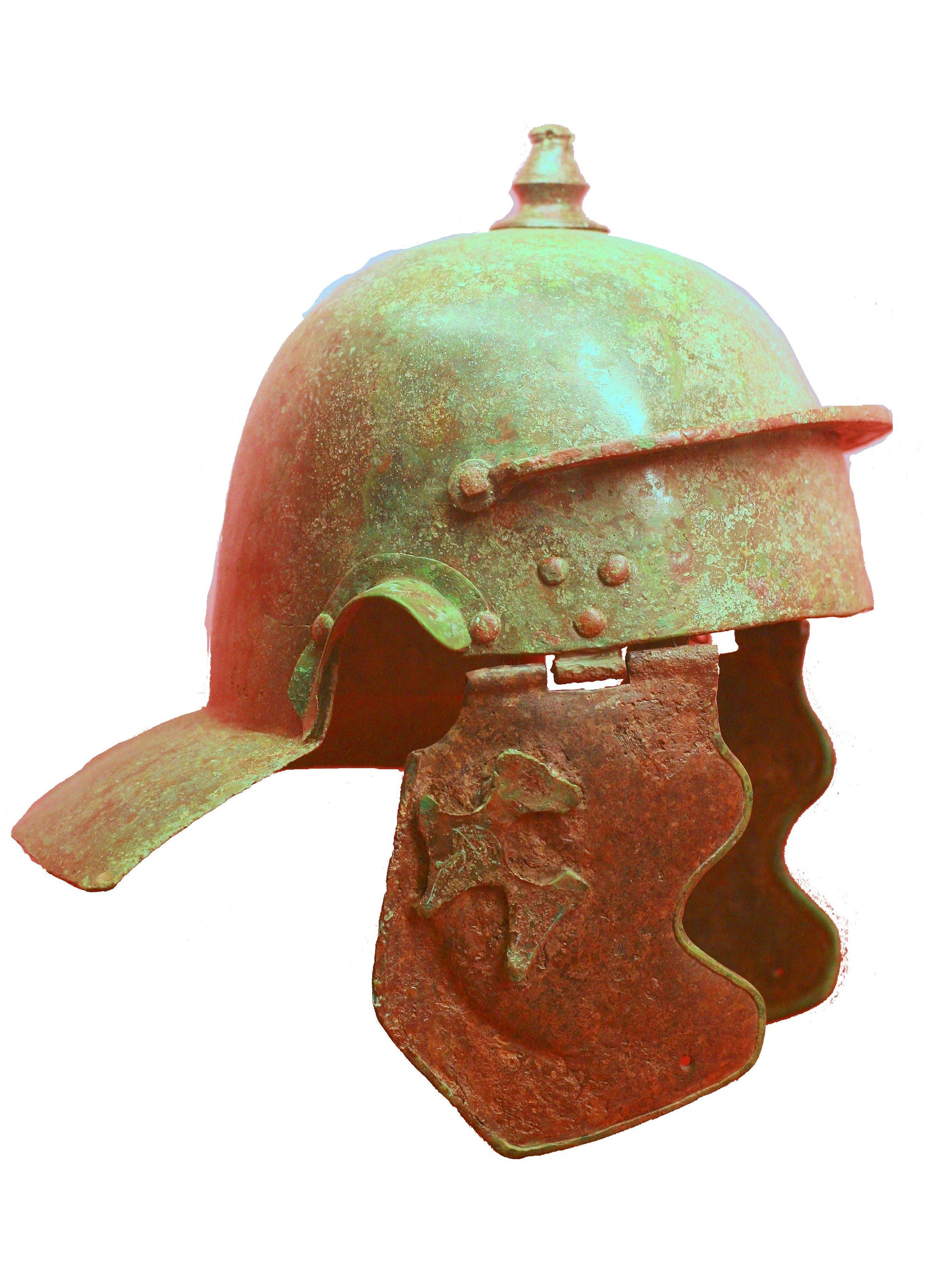
- Roman infantry helmet (late 1st century)
- Active: ?
- Country: Roman Empire
- Branch: auxilia
- Type: infantry
- Size: 480 men (480 infantry)
- Garrison/HQ: Traiectum

Cohors II Hispanorum peditata was an auxilia infantry cohort of the Imperial Roman army. The cohort, c. 90 CE, was based in the castellum of Traiectum on the Limes Germanicus in the Roman province of Germania Inferior.

== See also ==
- List of Roman auxiliary regiments
