= Siegfried Hirsch =

German historian

Siegfried Hirsch (5 November 1816 – 11 September 1860) was a German historian who was a native of Berlin. He was a cousin to historian Theodor Hirsch (1806-1881).

From 1833 to 1836 he was a student at the Universities of Berlin and Königsberg. While a student he published an award-winning essay on King Henry I called Das Leben und die Thaten König Heinrichs I (1834). A few years later he was co-author with Georg Waitz (1813-1886) on the publication of "Die Echtheit der Chronik von Korvei.

In 1842 Hirsch received his habilitation at Berlin, and in 1844 was appointed associate professor. In 1860 he died in Paris prior to finishing his treatise on Holy Roman Emperor Henry II, which is considered to be Hirsch's principal work. It was subsequently edited by Rudolf Usinger (1835-1874), Hermann Pabst (1842-1870) and Harry Bresslau (1848-1926), and was published as Jahrbücher des Deutschen Reichs unter Heinrich II (Annals of the German Empire under Henry II). Another noted work by Hirsch was a publication on medieval chronicler Sigebert of Gembloux, titled De vita et scriptis Sigiberti (1841).
