= Rudolf Usinger =

German historian (1835–1874)

Rudolf August Usinger (7 July 1835 – 31 May 1874) was a German historian born in Nienburg.

He studied history at the University of Göttingen, where he was a pupil of Georg Waitz (1813-1886). In 1863 he became a lecturer at Göttingen, and afterwards a professor of history at the Universities of Greifswald (from 1865) and Kiel (from 1868). Also, he was secretary of the Association for Schleswig-Holstein History.

Usinger is credited with editing the first volume of Siegfried Hirsch's Jahrbüchern des Deutschen Reichs unter Heinrich II (Annals of the German Empire under Henry II). Among his better known publications are the following:

- Die dänischen Annalen und Chroniken des Mittelalters (The Danish annals and chronicles of the Middle Ages), 1861.
- Deutsch-dänische Geschichte 1189-1227 (German-Danish history 1189-1227), 1863.
- Napoleon, der Rheinische und der Nordische Bund (Napoleon, the Rhineland and the Nordic Federation), 1865.
- Forschungen zur Lex Saxonum, (Research of Lex Saxonum), 1867.
- Die Anfänge der deutschen Geschichte (The beginnings of German history), 1875.
