= Bailiwick of Utrecht =

Chivalric order based in Utrecht

Bailiwick of Utrecht of the Teutonic Order
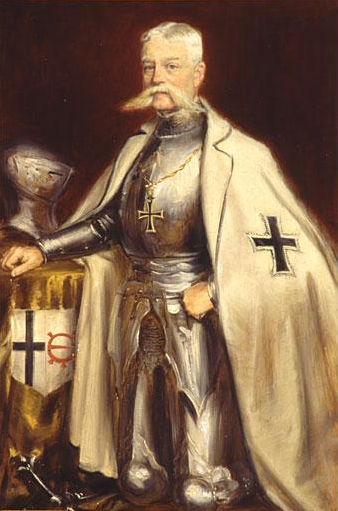
- Anne Willem Jacob Joost Baron van Nagell in the robes of the Land Commander of the Order
- Active: 1231 – present
- Allegiance: Holy Roman Emperor (1237–1637); Netherlands (1637–present)
- Type: Catholic religious order (1231–1637); Protestant chivalric order (1637–present)
- Headquarters: Duitse Huis, Utrecht, Netherlands
- Nicknames: Teutonic Knights, Netherlands Order
- Website: www.rdo.nl

Commanders
- First Land Commander: Antonius van Printhagen
- Current Land Commander: J.R. Baron de Vos van Steenwijk

The Bailiwick of Utrecht of the Teutonic Order (Dutch: Ridderlijke Duitse Orde Balije van Utrecht) is a chivalric order based in Utrecht, Netherlands. It originated in 1231 as a division of the order of Teutonic Knights.

During the Protestant Reformation most of the members became Protestant, mainly Reformed or Lutheran. The Bailiwick cut its ties with the order based in the Holy Roman Empire and placed itself under the protection of the United Provinces of the Netherlands.

The order was briefly suppressed during the Napoleonic era, but revived in 1815 after the restoration of the House of Orange. In 1995 it returned to the Duitse Huis (Teutonic House) as its headquarters, a building that dates from 1348.

== Foundation ==
The Teutonic Order originated in 1190 during the siege of Acre in the Holy Land during the Third Crusade. At first the mission was to nurse the sick and wounded crusaders. In 1198 a military element was added. The mission was to fight the enemies of Christendom, particularly in the Holy Land, and to protect pilgrims to the holy land. The statutes of the order were confirmed by Pope Innocent III in a bull of 19 February 1199.

The Teutonic Order was particularly active in the Baltic region. However, it had many branches in western Europe to provide sources of funds and of recruits. As with other religious institutions, the order depended on donations of land and buildings from princes and private individuals. The income could then support the troops. The order soon established an organization throughout the German Empire of bailiwicks headed by a land commander reporting to the German master. Below the land commander were commanders, who administered the order's property.

The Teutonic Order was given property in the Netherlands in 1218–19 by Count Adolf von Berg and Sweder van Dingede. The master of the order held the property at first. The Bailiwick of Utrecht was established in 1231 when a donation was made of a house with land at the Tolsteegsingel, outside Utrecht in the location of the present University Hospital. In 1232 a commander's house had been built and Antonius van Printhagen, known as "Lederzak" (leatherbag) was named commander of Utrecht. This became the headquarters of all the property of the Teutonic order in the diocese of Utrecht, Holland, Zeeland, Friesland and Gelderland.

== Early years ==
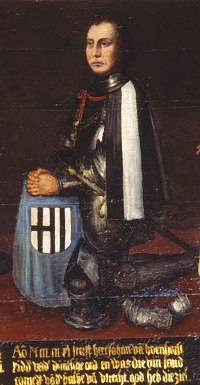
Johan van Hoenhorst, land commander 1325–40

The Teutonic Order's Bailiwick of Utrecht (Balije van Utrecht) initially focused mainly on the spiritual development of its own members. The knights and priests took the vows of poverty, chastity and obedience. The Bailiwick of Utrecht soon owned several estates and churches. These included the church of Maasland (1241), St. Nicholas Church in Utrecht (1250), Leiden (1268), Rhenen (1270), the church of Valkenburg in Katwijk (1388) and so on. Commanderies were founded to manage these properties, and over time these came to include the commanderies of Dieren, Schelluinen, Maasland, Schoten, Middelburg, Tiel, Leiden, Doesburg, Nes (Friesland), Valkenburg, Bunne (Drenthe), Schoonhoven, Rhenen and Katwijk. There were convents of priest brethren at Nes, Rhenen and Tiel. The smaller houses also owned large areas of land, and were run by commanders. The head of a commandery was usually a knight but was sometimes a priest brother.

The knight brethren were nobles. The land commander was always a knight, and most of the commanders were also knights. A knight brother had to have no physical defects, and be of legitimate birth with four noble grandparents. He gave a vow of chastity and obedience. Once admitted after an elaborate ceremony he could not leave the order. The order was not a religious one, since its goals were mainly nursing the sick and fighting the enemies of Christendom, but religious worship played a large role in the community's life. A convent or main house of a Bailiwick should consist of a commander and twelve brothers, recalling Jesus and his disciples. Thus in the 15th century the Duitse Huis had five knight brothers and eight priest brothers.

In 1345 Count William IV of Holland, who was engaged in a struggle with the bishop of Utrecht, laid siege to Utrecht. After the siege the land commander decided to move his headquarters into the city for safety reasons. He bought some land with four houses on the Springweg for this purpose. Construction began in May 1347, and by 1358 the headquarters house and a large church were complete. The Duitse Huis lay between the city wall and Springweg. In the main Duitse Huis in addition to the knights and priests there were staff who assisted in church services and helped run the house and manage the bailiwick. These included the treasurer, clerks, storekeeper and other administrative staff, as well as builders and craftsmen, and servants such as the baker, brewer, dishwasher and barber. The Duitse Huis had a large household for which a well-coordinated organization was essential. Members of the Utrecht bailiwick were actively involved in cultural production as well. Amongst other, priest-brother Gerard of Vliederhoven wrote the influential Cordiale de quattuor novissimis whilst working in the Schoonhoven commandery. At the end of the fifteenth century, the Jüngere Hochmeisterchronik was written at the Duitse Huis, probably by the Utrecht land commander Johan van Drongelen with help by his personal secretary.

The Bailiwick's expenses were covered by the return from assets, mostly farmland, which could not be alienated or encumbered without the assent of the general chapter of the order. As long as regular donations were received, the system was workable. With political strife, it began to fall apart. In 1520 there was a financial crisis when the general chapter demanded more money, and the land commanders of Utrecht, Alden Biezen, Westphalia and Lorraine jointly protested. They organized another protest in 1529 when the general chapter in Frankfurt asked for a further financial sacrifice. The Guelderian Wars caused much damage by both sides to the bailiwick's possessions, and the bailiwick had to supply 20 land knights to Vienna to help in the fight against the Turks, at considerable expense. In 1525 Albert of Brandenberg, grand master of the Teutonic Order, adopted Lutheranism and was made hereditary duke of Prussia by Sigismund I, king of Poland. After the loss of Prussia the Grand Magistery of the Order was transferred to Mergentheim.

Sometimes the Duitse Huis was relevant for ceremonial occasions. In 1545 the Emperor Charles V and his sister Mary of Hungary made the house their residence on the occasion of a meeting of the Order of the Golden Fleece. In 1570 the administrator of the order's high master was housed there when he accompanied the Anne of Austria to Spain as bride of Philip II. Although technically bound to celibacy, the knights did not take this vow very seriously. Albert van Egmond van Meresteyn, land commander in 1536–60, kept a mistress in a cottage in the Teutonic House grounds and apparently legitimized her daughter in 1549. His successor Frans van Loo, land commander in 1560–79, also paid no attention to this vow. Frans van Loo and his coadjutor Jasper van Egmond were both assumed to have Protestant sympathies.

== Transitional period ==
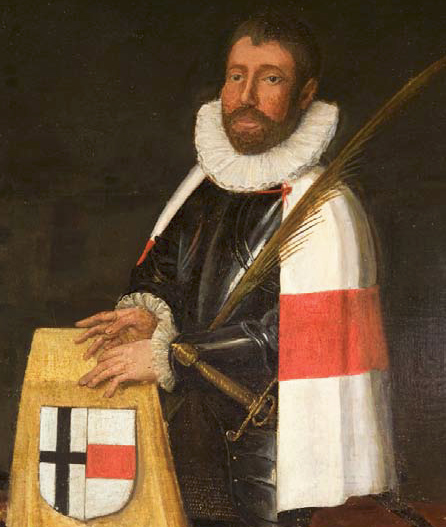
Jacob Taets van Amerongen, land commander in 1579–1612

The Union of Utrecht was signed on 23 January 1579 in Utrecht by Holland, Zeeland, Utrecht, Gelderland and Groningen. In the months that followed the other Protestant territories and cities of the Netherlands joined the union. In 1580 the States of Utrecht began to demand that Catholic institutions such as the Bailiwick be dissolved and their goods used for charity. The Catholic land commander in 1579–1612, Jacob Taets van Amerongen, resisted on the basis that the goods "belonged to our Lord the German Master", and that the Bailiwick was a knightly institution that served "where necessary to fight with weapons for the defense of the Empire against our common arch enemy, the Turk..."

A struggle ensued with the States of Utrecht, which finally allowed the order to continue to exist on condition that they completely break with the Teutonic Order in Germany. The States of Utrecht would appoint the land commander, coadjutor and commanders. Assets could not be sold without the consent of the States and the order had to contribute to the costs of maintenance and preservation of the reformed worship. Although forced to accept these terms, Taets van Amerongen was an ardent supporter of the Catholic faith and throughout his life considered that he was subordinate to the German master and the Archduke of Austria.

Taets van Amerongen died on 4 December 1612. On 18 December 1612 the commanders were ordered to provide a detailed account of their goods, rents and mortgages. The investigation showed that the Bailiwick had serious problems and had to adopt drastic measures. Dieren and Tiel were heavily indebted, and some property had to be sold. On 8 June 1615, when the chapter asked for permission to appoint a coadjutor, the States determined that offices, prebends and so on could only be given to followers of the reformed religion.

The decisive moment in the transition may have occurred when Jasper van Lynden took office in 1619, since he was the first Protestant land commander. At almost the same time, Hendrik Casimir van Nassau-Dietz was appointed coadjutor of the order, at the age of seven. A new regulation was adopted in 1619 allowing the land commander, coadjutor and commanders to marry, but they had to leave the order and had no claim to their property. By a resolution of 13 November 1637 the ban on marriage was withdrawn, and this was approved by the States on 5 May 1640, so married members could remain with the Bailiwick.

== Protestant order ==
In 1637 the knights formally accepted the protection of the United Provinces of the Netherlands. They remained an order of Teutonic Knights, but were no longer Catholic. The land commander and commanders decided on admission to the order. Candidates had to provide their certificate of baptism and had to belong to the reformed church. After paying their fees, they became knights expectant, and had to wait for a vacancy among the commanders.

The Bailiwick gradually lost property. The house in Dieren was destroyed by soldiers in 1629 and had to be rebuilt. The new house and its estate were sold to the Prince of Orange. In 1657 the town of Doesburg took over the commander's house for use as an orphanage. The order lost the church of Katwijk in 1674. Buildings that were too expensive to maintain were demolished in Tiel (1682), Maasland (1721), Leiden (1730), Middelburg (1740) and Schoonhoven (1740). By now the commanders generally did not live in their commanderies, and did not exercise effective financial control. At a meeting on 23 September 1760 a general steward was appointed to take over all financial administration. The commanders now became purely title holders, receiving a salary determined by the rank and importance of the commandery. The general steward received a salary of 6% of total revenues, plus fixed fees for managing the finances and maintaining the house in Utrecht. Use of this house for banquets, balls and concerts was forbidden.

The land commander, knights and staff remained at the Duitse Huis until 1807, when the property was sold to King Louis for 50,000 guilders. They then moved to a house in the Hague, taking their records with them. On 27 February 1811 the Teutonic Order was abolished by the French in the Kingdom of Holland and its estates were confiscated. The land commander Baron Bentinck asked the French for time to arrange for the settlement, and managed to greatly delay the process. A book published in 1812, slightly out of date, said the bailiwick of Utrecht still had ten commanderies: Dieren, Veluve, Tiel, Maasland, Rheenen, Leyden, Schoten,.Doesburg, Schelluinen, Middelburg and Schoonhoven.

After the fall of Napoleon and the restoration of the House of Orange, on 8 August 1815 the Bailiwick was revived by royal decree of William I of the Netherlands. The membership was restricted to Lutheran noblemen with sixteen noble quarterings. In recent years this restriction has been relaxed, but members must still have four noble grandparents, and the families of the paternal and maternal lines must both date to before 1795. In December 1836 the seat of the order was moved back to Utrecht. In 1995 the Teutonic Order moved back into the 15th century Commander's house on the corner of Springweg and Walsteeg. Today the order is engaged in charitable work, an echo of its original mission which also combined ministering to the sick with combating the infidel. The order assists people with disabilities, the homeless and drug addicts. It is the oldest charitable organization in the Netherlands.

== Land Commanders ==
Land Commanders of the order were:

- Antonius van Printhagen, 1231–1266.
- Dierik van der Horst, (also in Biesen), 1274–1289.
- Seger van der Sluse van Huesde, 1279.
- Gijsbert van den Goye, 1286.
- Ludolf van Bun, 1288.
- Dierik G. v. Holland, (also Biesen & Koblenz), 1289–1317.
- Gisbert van Drongelen van Neisteijn, 1325.
- Johan van Hoenhorst, (also in Biesen), 1325–1340.
- Gosen van Garmaer, 1336–1357.
- Rutger van Vriemersheim, (also in Biesen), 1353–1358.
- Renier Hoen van Hoensbroek, (also Biesen), 1358–1371.
- Lodewijk van Keuswaelre, 1360.
- Rutger van Vlimerschen, 1365.
- Hendrick van Alckemade, 1375.
- Hendrik van Hoenhorst, 1379.
- Gerrit Splinter van den Enge, 1405.
- Hernier van Opburen, 1407.
- Johan van den Sande, 1411–1437.
- Herman van Keppel, 1422–1442.
- Sweden Cubbinck, 1440.
- Albert Vorst, 1440–1452.
- Dirk van Enghuizen, 1444–1463.
- Johan van Hoeften, 1455–1463.
- Nicolaas van der Dussen, 1463–1466.
- Hendrik van Hackfort, 1467–1468.
- Johan van Drongelen, 1469–1492.
- Gozen van Rossum, 1492–1496.
- Steven van Zuylen van Nijevelt, 1496–1527.
- Wouter van Amstel van Mynden, 1527–1536.
- Albert van Egmond van Meresteyn, 1536–1560.
- Frans van der Loe, 1560–1579.
- Jacob Taets van Amerongen, 1579–1612.
- Diederik van Bloys van Treslong, 1612–1619.
- Jasper van Lynden, 1619–1620.
- Hendrik Casimir I van Nassau-Dietz, 1620–1640.
- Willem Frederik van Nassau-Dietz, 1641–1664.
- Floris Borre van Amerongen, 1664–1675.
- Heinrich von Solms, 1675–1693.
- Hendrik Casimir II van Nassau-Dietz, 1693–1696.
- Godard van Reede van Athlone, 1697–1703.
- Frederik Borre van Amerongen, 1703–1722.
- Willem van Lintelo, 1723–1732.
- Evert Jan Benjamin van Goltstein, 1732–1744.
- Lucas Willem van Broekhuizen, 1744–1748.
- Hendrik van Iselmuden, 1748–1751.
- Frederik Willem Torck, 1753–1761.
- Unico Willem van Wasenaer, 1763–1766.
- Frans Steven Carel van Randwijck, 1766–1785.
- Karl Ludwig von Anhalt-Bernburg-Schaumburg, 1786–1806.
- Jan Walraad van Welderen, 1806–1807.
- Arend van Raesfelt van Elsen, 1807.
- Volker Rudolf Bentinck van Schoonheeten, 1807–1820.
- Adriaan Wolter Willem Sloet van Sinderen, 1820–1824.
- Godert Willem de Vos van Steenwijk, 1824–1830.
- Rudolph Hendrik van Iselmuden, 1831–1834.
- Floris Willem Sloet tot Warmelo, 1834–1838.
- Albert Carel Snouckaert van Schauburg, 1838–1841.
- Carl Wilhelm Georg Johan Theodor Bodelschwingh-Plettenberg, 1841–1850.
- Otto Anna van Bylant, 1850–1857.
- Boudewijn Reynt Wouter Sloet van Hagendorp, 1857–1863.
- Frederik Louis Wilhelm van Brakell, 1863–1865.
- Hendrik Rudolph Willem van Goltstein van Oldenaller, 1865–1868.
- Alexander Carel Jacob Schimmelpenninck van der Oye, 1868–1877.
- Jan Derk van Rechteren van Ahnen, 1877–1886.
- François Maximiliaan van der Duyn, 1886–1889.
- Otto van Dedem, 1889–1894.
- Reinhard Jan Christiaan van Pallandt van Rosendael, 1894–1899.
- Emilius Johan van Pallandt, 1899–1914.
- Alexander Schimmelpenninck van der Oye, 1914–1918.
- Anne Willem Jacob Joost van Nagell, 1918–1936.
- Otto Jacob Eiffelanus van Wassenaer van Catwijck, 1936–1939.
- Karel Gerrit Willem van Wassenaer, 1939–1946.
- Frand Johan Julius van Heemstra, 1946–1958.
- Bernhard Frederik van Verschuer, 1958–1971.
- Hendrik Jan van Nagell, 1971–1977.
- Paul Anthony van der Borch, 1977–2014.
- Jan Reint de Vos van Steenwijk, 2014-
