= Max Toeppen =

German historian (1822–1893)

Max Pollux Toeppen, surname sometimes spelled Töppen (4 April 1822 in Königsberg – 3 December 1893 in Elbing) was a German historian and educator.

He studied classical philology and history at the University of Königsberg, where he received his doctorate (1843) and habilitation (1848). From 1854 he was director of the "progymnasium" in Hohenstein, followed by administrative positions at schools in Marienwerder (1869–1882) and Elbing (1882–1893).

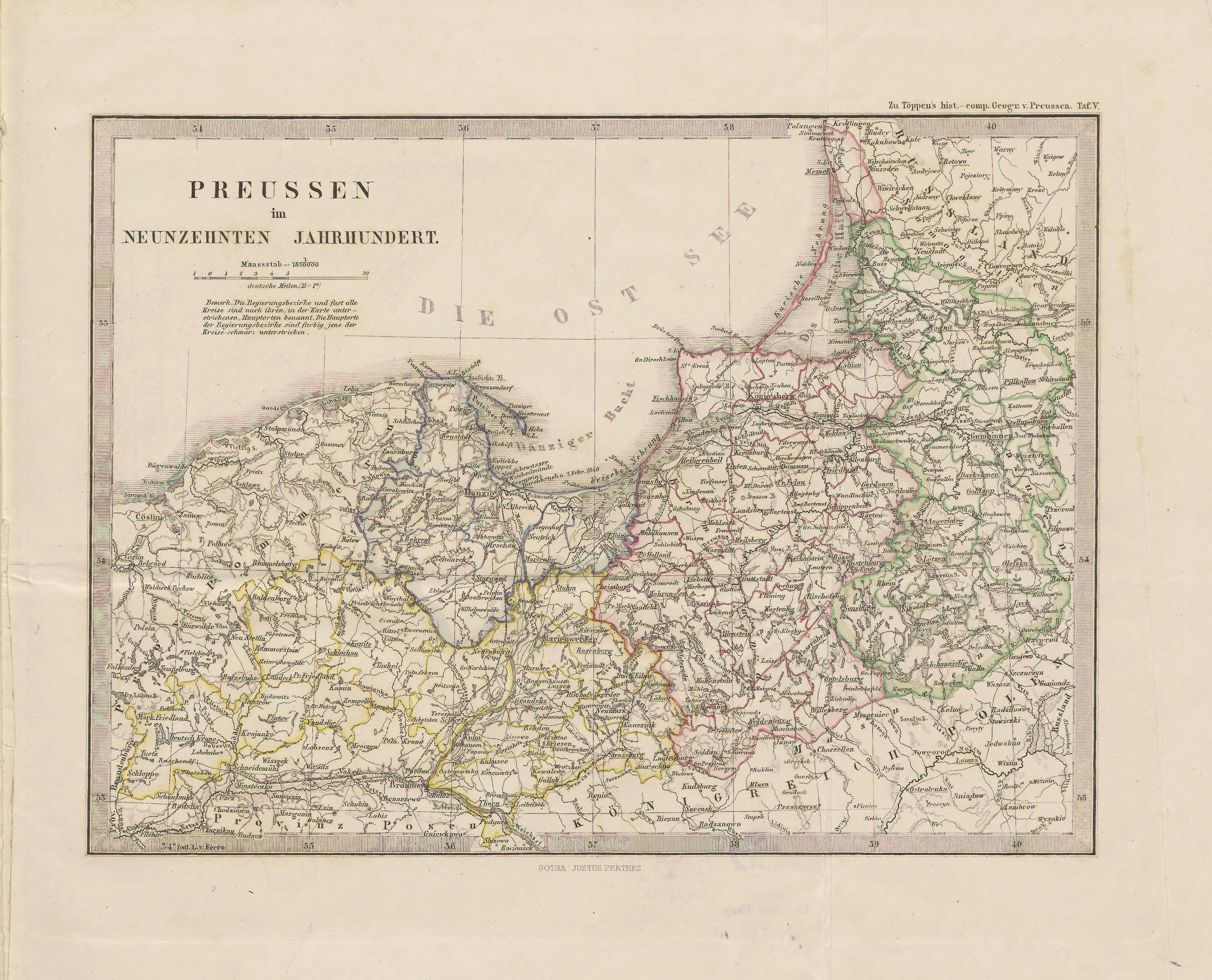
Map of West and East Prussia from Toeppen's "Atlas zur historisch-comparativen Geographie von Preussen" (1858).

Known for his scholarly investigations on Prussian history, he was co-editor of Scriptores rerum Prussicarum (1861-1874, 5 volumes), and editor of Acten der Ständetage Preußens unter der Herrschaft des Deutschen Ordens (Acts of Prussian "Ständetage" under the rule of the Teutonic Knights; 1874–1886, 5 volumes). The following are a few of his historical writings:

- Critica de Historia Borussiae Antiqua, 1847
- Geschichte der preussischen Historiographie, 1853 - History of Prussian historiography.
- Atlas zur historisch-comparativen Geographie von Preussen, 1858 - Atlas of comparative historical geography of Prussia.
- Geschichte Masurens, 1870 - History of Masuria
- Geschichte der Stadt Marienwerder und ihrer Kunstbauten, 1875 - History of the city of Marienwerder and its engineering structures.
- Geschichte der räumlichen Ausbreitung der Stadt Elbing mit besonderer Berücksichtigung ihrer Befestigung und ihrer wichtigsten Gebäude, 1887 - History on the spatial spread of the town of Elbing, etc.
