= Utrecht =

City and municipality in Utrecht, Netherlands

Utrecht Ut(e)reg (Utrechts)
- City and municipality
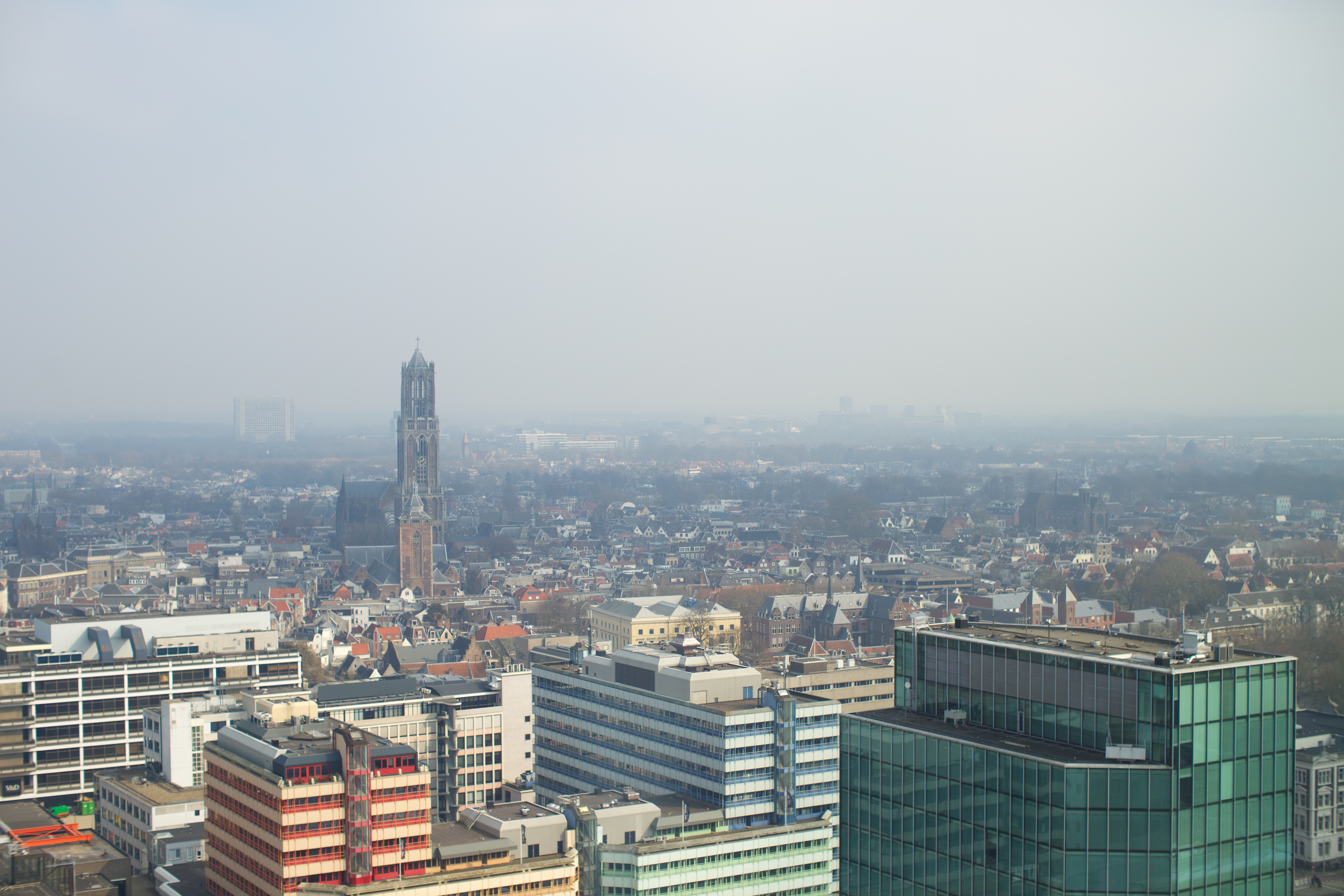
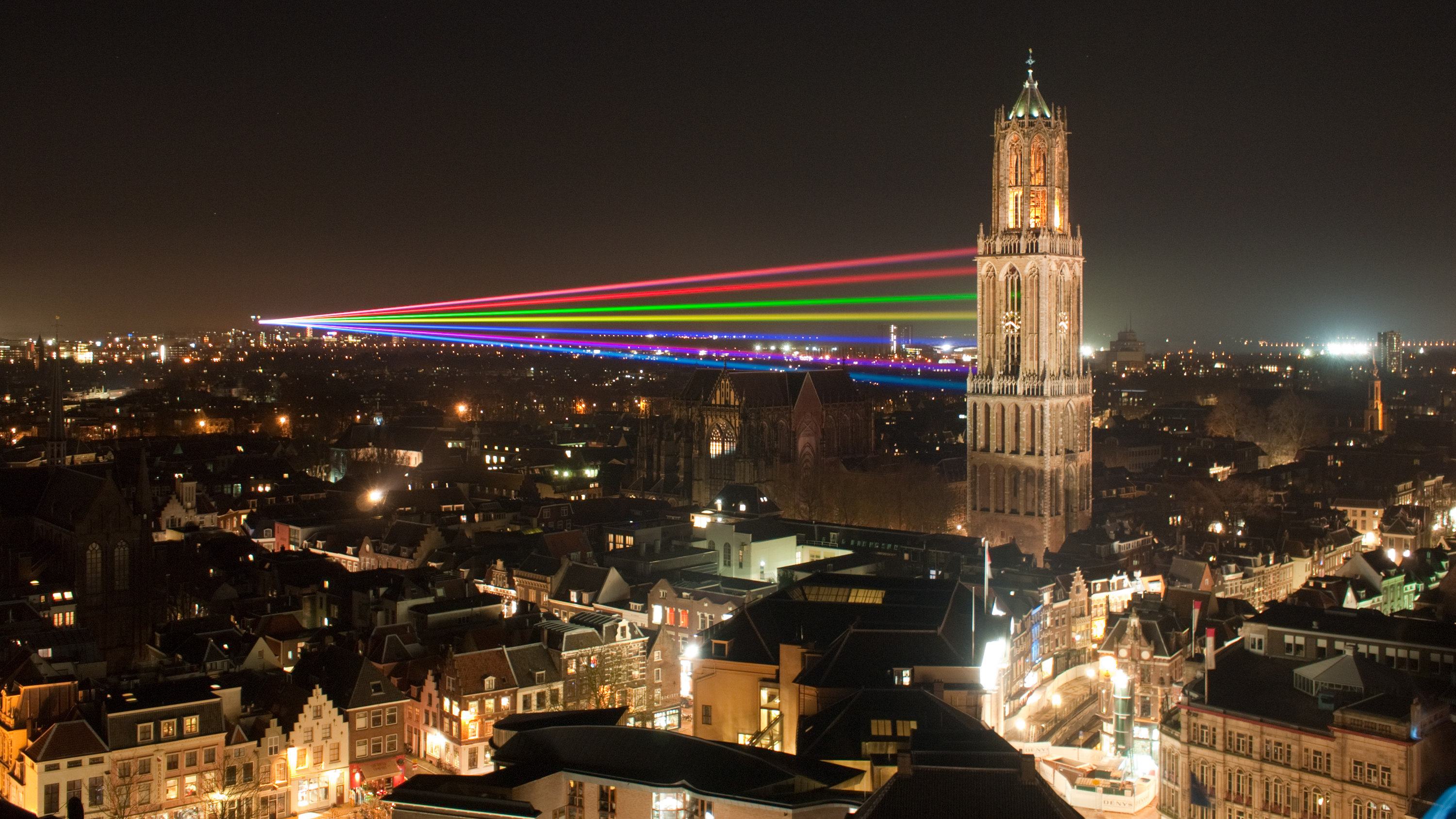
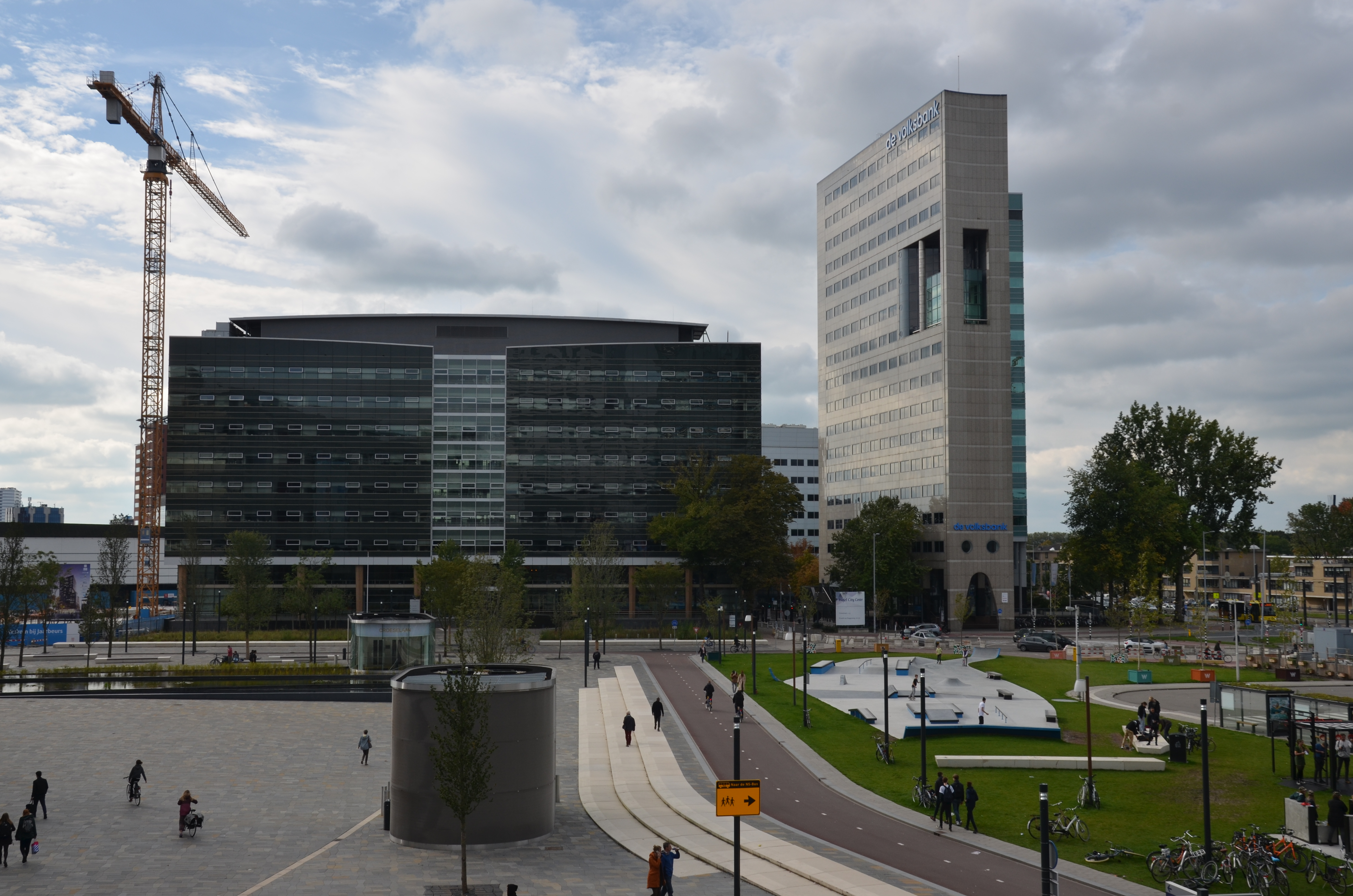
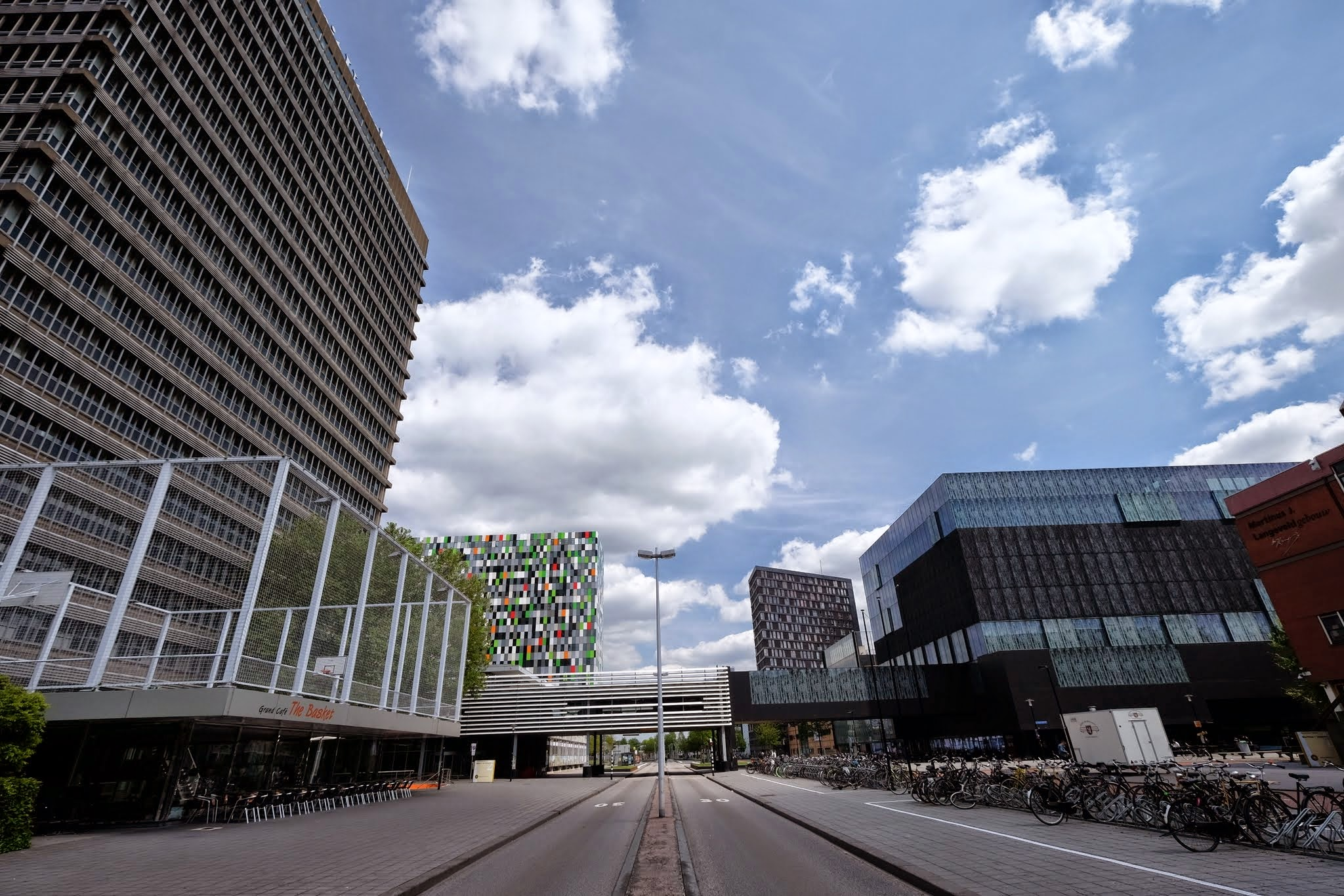
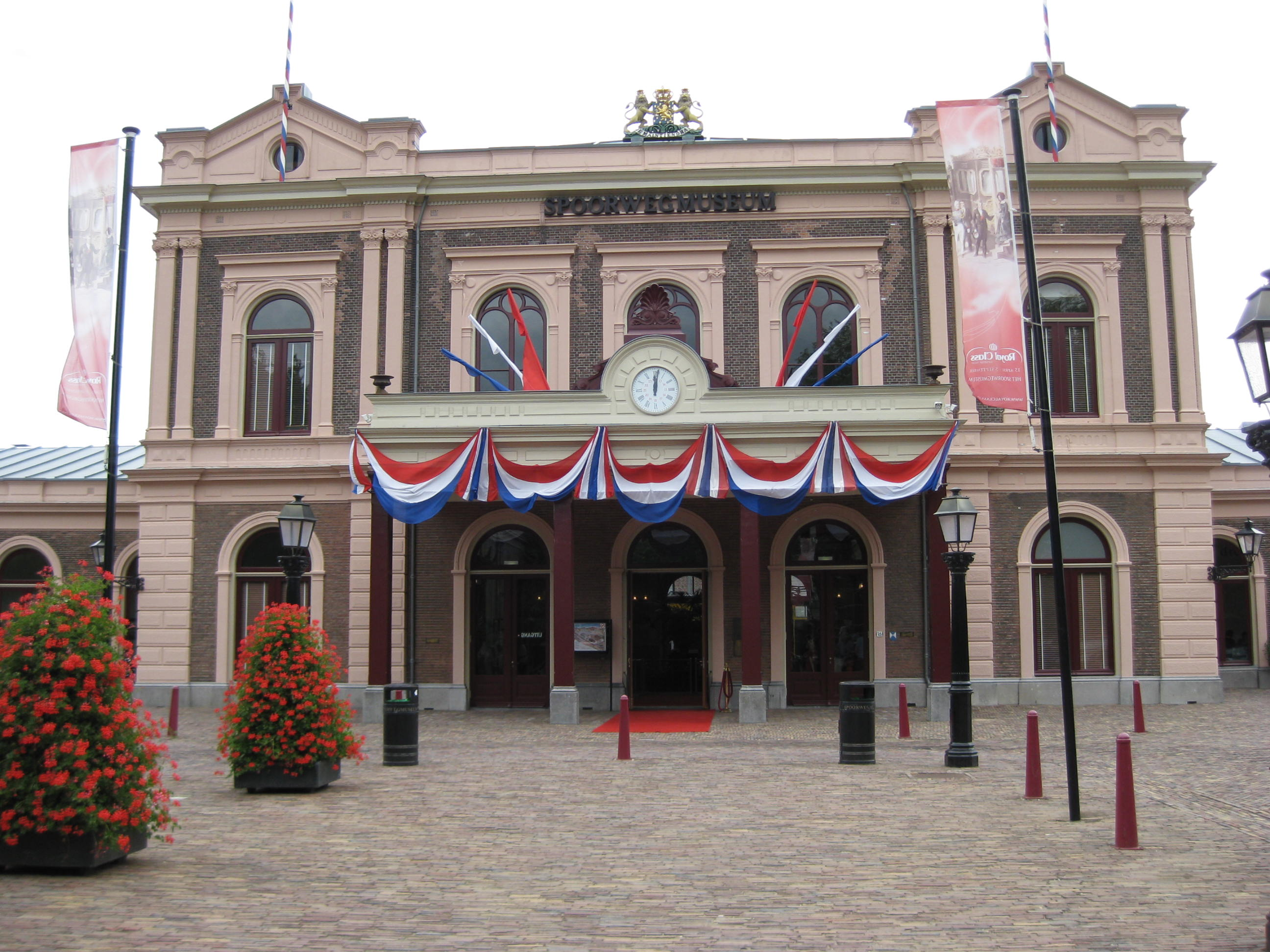
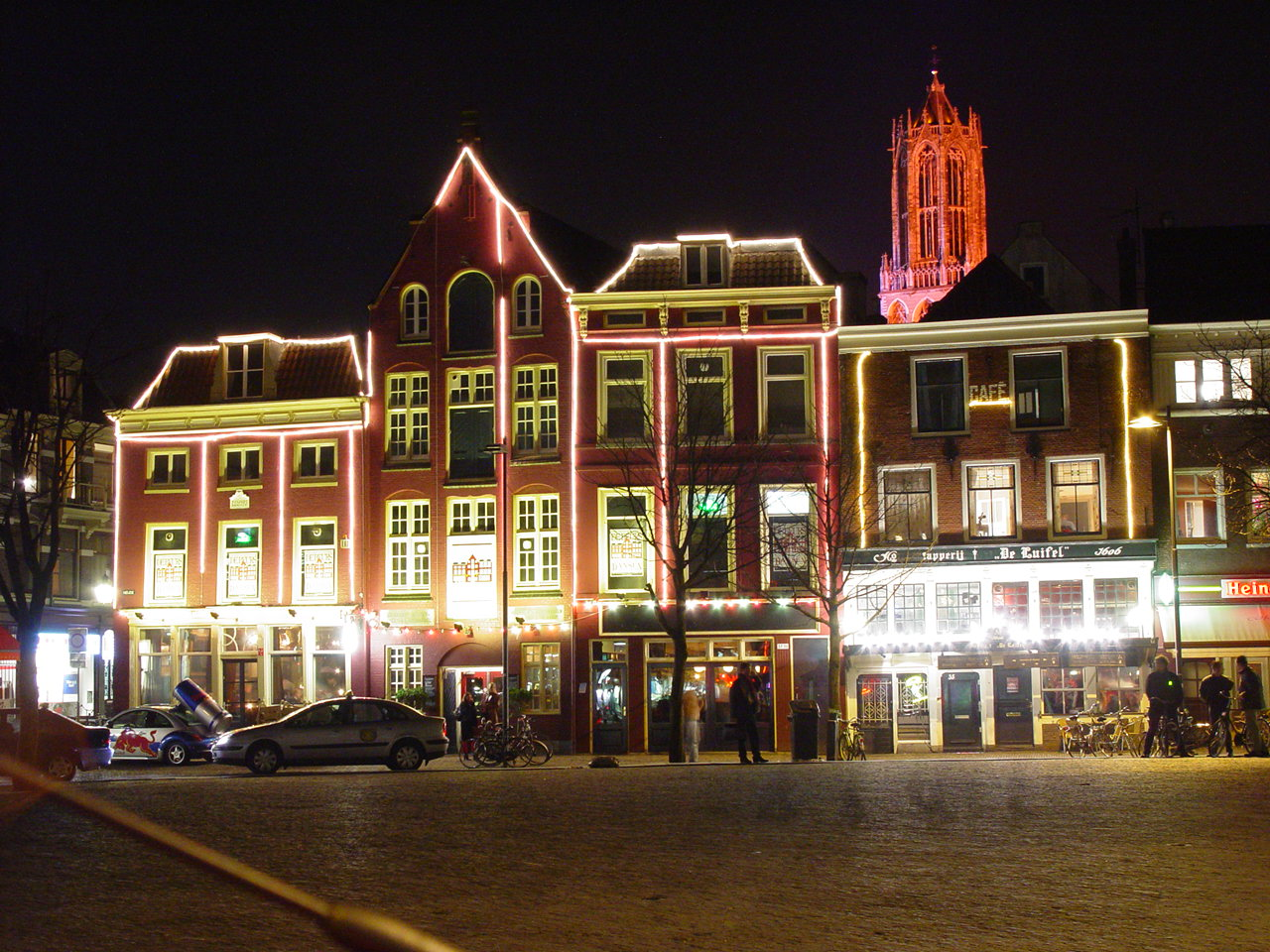
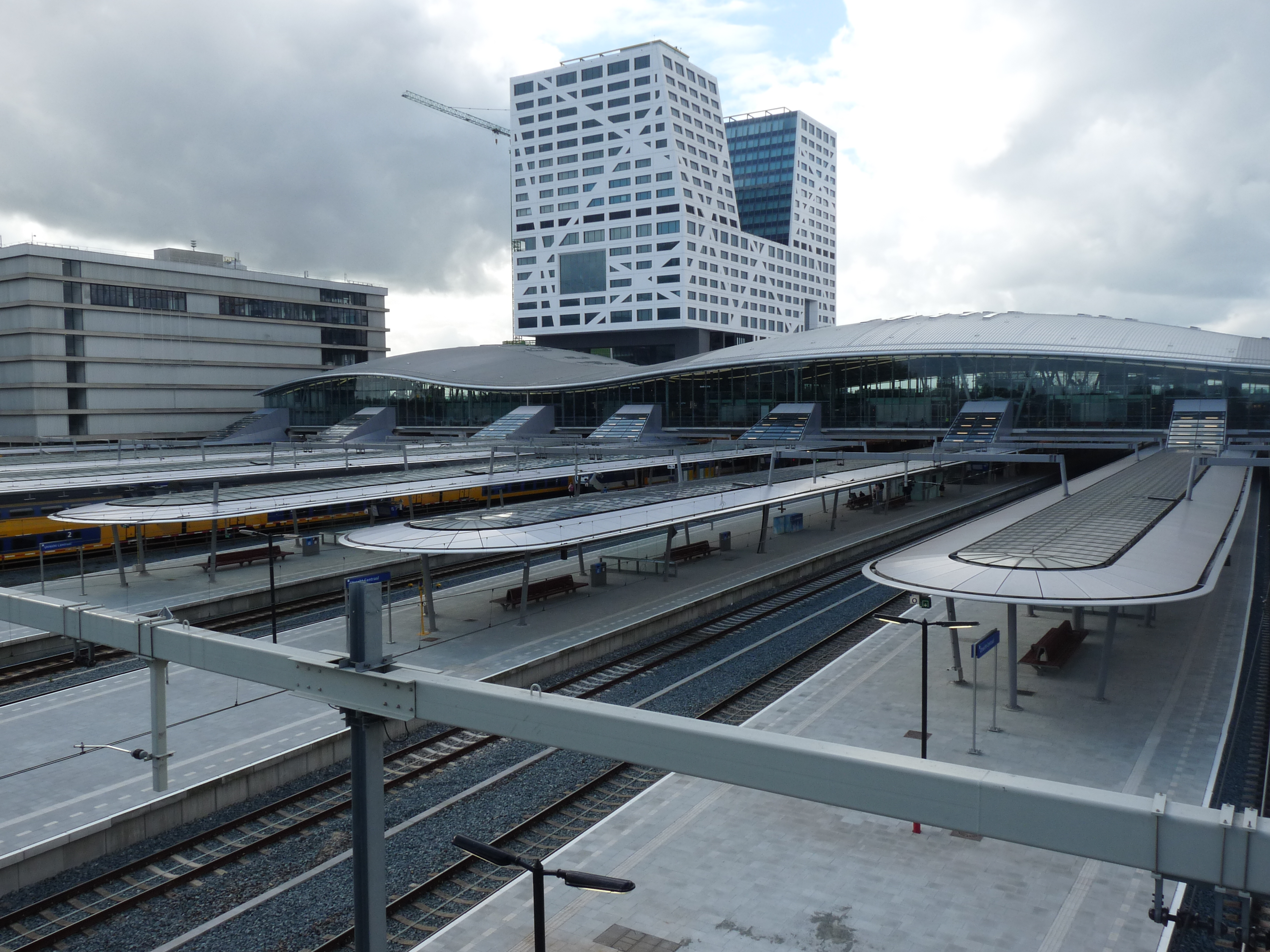
- Utrecht seen from above Dom Tower of the St. Martin's Cathedral Jaarbeursplein Uithof centre in Utrecht Science Park Railway Museum Neude Utrecht Centraal railway station

- Flag Coat of arms Brandmark
- Nickname: Domstad (Cathedral City)
- Location of Utrecht municipality
- Interactive map of Utrecht
- Location within the Netherlands Location within Europe
- Coordinates: 52°05′27″N 05°07′18″E
- Country: Netherlands
- Province: Utrecht

Government
  - Body: Municipal council
  - Mayor: Sharon Dijksma (PvdA)

Area
  - Municipality: 99.21 km^{2} (38.31 sq mi)
  - Land: 93.83 km^{2} (36.23 sq mi)
  - Water: 5.38 km^{2} (2.08 sq mi)
  - Randstad: 3,043 km^{2} (1,175 sq mi)
- Elevation: 5 m (16 ft)

Population (1 January 2026)
  - Municipality: 378,140
  - Density: 3,812/km^{2} (9,870/sq mi)
  - Urban: 489,734
  - Metro: 656,342
  - Randstad: 6,979,500
- Demonym: Utrechter(s) (Note: See Utrecht sodomy trials § Legacy for the history of these demonyms.)

GDP
  - Randstad: €602.711 billion (2024)
- Time zone: UTC+1 (CET)
  - Summer (DST): UTC+2 (CEST)
- Postcode: 3450–3455, 3500–3585
- Area code: 030
- Website: www.utrecht.nl

Utrecht (/ˈjuːtrɛkt/ YOO-trekt; Dutch: [ˈytrɛxt]; Utrecht dialect: Ut(e)reg [ˈyt(ə)ʁɛχ]) is the fourth-largest city of the Netherlands, as well as the capital and the most populous city of the province of Utrecht. The municipality of Utrecht is located in the eastern part of the Randstad conurbation, in the very centre of mainland Netherlands, and includes Haarzuilens, Vleuten and De Meern. It has a population of 378,140 as of January 2026.

Utrecht's ancient city centre features many buildings and structures, several dating as far back as the High Middle Ages. It has been the religious centre of the Netherlands since the 8th century. It received city rights in 1122. In 1579, the Union of Utrecht was signed in the city to lay the foundations for the Dutch Republic.

Utrecht’s historic centre is characterised by the Dom Tower and a medieval canal system with wharves and cellars below street level. Today, Utrecht is a major national railway hub and a centre for higher education, research, healthcare and culture. The municipality contains the Rietveld Schröder House and components of the Lower German Limes and the Dutch Water Defence Lines, all of which are UNESCO World Heritage properties. In 2025, Lonely Planet selected Utrecht as one of 25 destinations featured in its Best in Travel 2026 guide.

== History ==
=== Origins (before 650 CE) ===
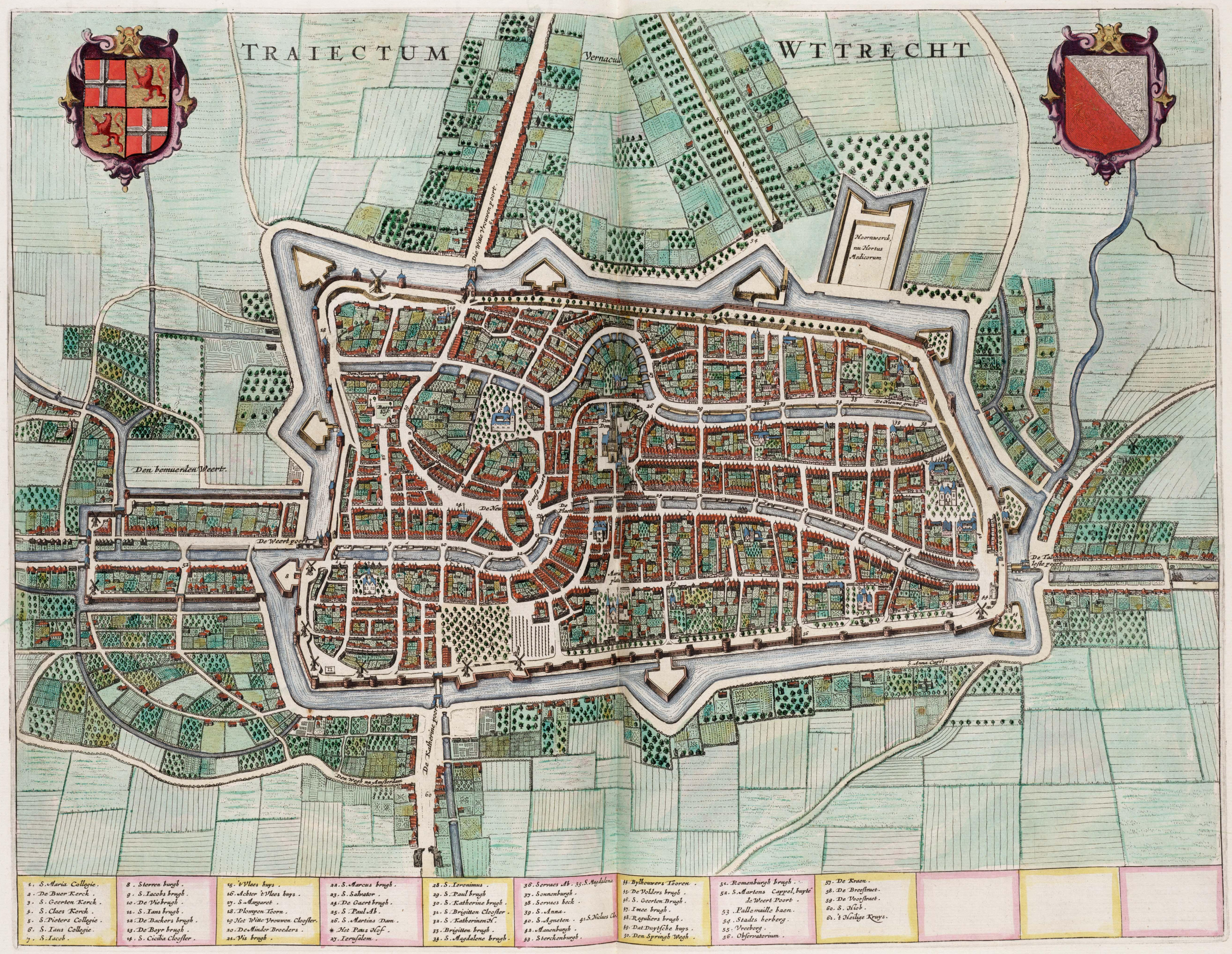
Willem Blaeu's 1652 map of Utrecht (here Traiectum Wttrecht) with its canals and fortifications with nurseries in green on the outside. North is to the left.

Although there is some evidence of earlier inhabitation in the region of Utrecht, dating back to the Stone Age (app. 2200 BCE) and settling in the Bronze Age (app. 1800–800 BCE), the founding date of the city is usually related to the construction of a Roman fortification (castellum), probably built in around 50 CE. A series of such fortresses were built after the Roman emperor Claudius decided the empire should not expand further north. To consolidate the border, the Limes Germanicus defense line was constructed along the main branch of the river Rhine, which at that time traversed a more northern route (now known as the Kromme Rijn, Crooked Rhine) compared to today's Rhine flow. These fortresses were designed to house a cohort of about 500 Roman soldiers. Near the fort, settlements grew that housed artisans, traders and soldiers' wives and children.

In Roman times, the name of the Utrecht fortress was simply Traiectum, denoting its location at a possible Rhine crossing. Traiectum became Dutch Trecht; with the U from Old Dutch "uut" (downriver) added to distinguish U-trecht from Maas-tricht, on the river Meuse. In 11th-century official documents, it was Latinized as Ultra Traiectum. Around the year 200, the wooden walls of the fortification were replaced by sturdier tuff stone walls, remnants of which are still to be found below the buildings around Dom Square.

From the middle of the 3rd century, Germanic tribes regularly invaded the Roman territories. After around 275 the Romans could no longer maintain the northern border, and Utrecht was abandoned. Little is known about the period from 270 to 650. Utrecht is first spoken of again several centuries after the Romans left. Under the influence of the growing realms of the Franks, during Dagobert I's reign in the 7th century, a church was built within the walls of the Roman fortress. In ongoing border conflicts with the Frisians, this first church was destroyed.

=== Centre of Christianity in the Netherlands (650–1579) ===
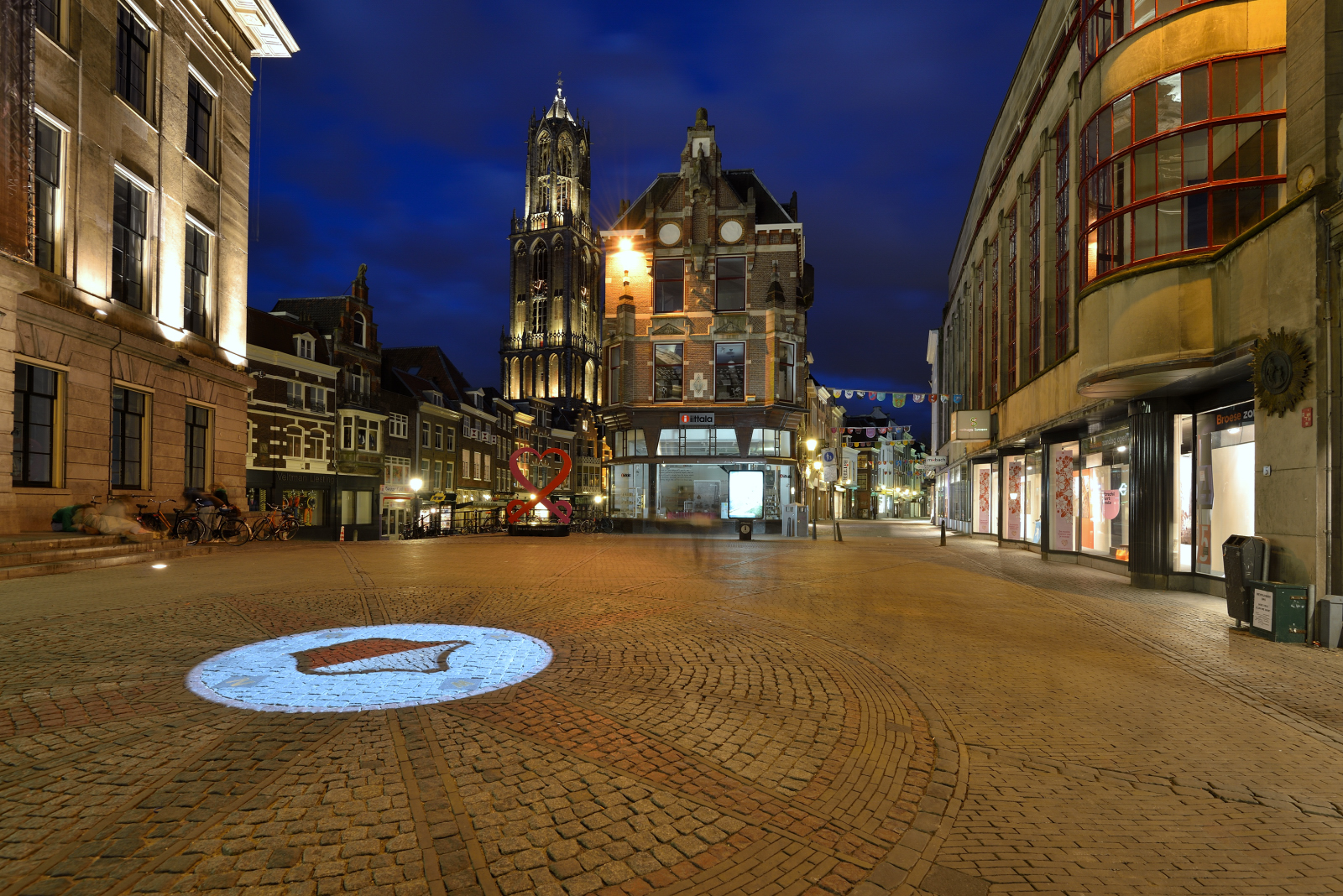
The Dom Tower seen from the Stadhuisbrug (Town Hall Bridge) in the city centre, 2013. The remaining section of the Cathedral of Saint Martin is not connected to the tower (in the background) since the collapse of the nave due to the 1674 derecho.

By the mid-7th century, British, English and Irish missionaries set out to convert the Frisians. Pope Sergius I appointed their leader, Saint Willibrordus, as bishop of the Frisians. The tenure of Willibrordus is generally considered to be the beginning of the Bishopric of Utrecht. In 723, the Frankish leader Charles Martel bestowed the fortress in Utrecht and the surrounding lands as the base of the bishops. From then on Utrecht became one of the most influential seats of power for the Catholic Church in the Netherlands. The archbishops of Utrecht were based at the uneasy northern border of the Carolingian Empire. In addition, the city of Utrecht had competition from the nearby trading centre Dorestad. After the fall of Dorestad around 850, Utrecht became one of the most important cities in the Netherlands. The importance of Utrecht as a centre of Christianity is illustrated by the election of the Utrecht-born Adriaan Florenszoon Boeyens as pope in 1522 (the last non-Italian pope before John Paul II).

==== Prince-bishops ====
When the Frankish rulers established the system of feudalism, the Bishops of Utrecht came to exercise worldly power as prince-bishops. The territory of the bishopric not only included the modern province of Utrecht (Nedersticht, 'lower Sticht') but also extended to the northeast. The feudal conflict of the Middle Ages heavily affected Utrecht. The prince-bishopric was involved in almost continuous conflicts with the Counts of Holland and the Dukes of Guelders. The Veluwe region was seized by Guelders, but large areas in the modern province of Overijssel remained as the Oversticht.

==== Religious buildings ====
Several churches and monasteries were built inside, or close to, the city of Utrecht. The most dominant of these was the Cathedral of Saint Martin, inside the old Roman fortress. The construction of the present Gothic building was begun in 1254 after an earlier romanesque construction had been badly damaged by fire. The choir and transept were finished from 1320 and were followed then by the ambitious Dom tower. The last part to be constructed was the central nave, from 1420. By that time, however, the age of the great cathedrals had come to an end and declining finances prevented the ambitious project from being finished, the construction of the central nave being suspended before the planned flying buttresses could be finished. Besides the cathedral there were four collegiate churches in Utrecht: St. Salvator's Church (demolished in the 16th century), on the Dom square, dating back to the early 8th century. Saint John (Janskerk), originating in 1040; Saint Peter, building started in 1039 and Saint Mary's church building started around 1090 (demolished in the early 19th century, cloister survives). Besides these churches, the city housed St. Paul's Abbey, the 15th-century beguinage of St. Nicholas, and a 14th-century chapter house of the Teutonic Knights.

Besides these buildings which belonged to the bishopric, an additional four parish churches were constructed in the city: the Jacobikerk (dedicated to Saint James), founded in the 11th century, with the current Gothic church dating back to the 14th century; the Buurkerk (Neighbourhood-church) of the 11th-century parish in the centre of the city; Nicolaichurch (dedicated to Saint Nicholas), from the 12th century, and the 13th-century Geertekerk (dedicated to Saint Gertrude of Nivelles).

==== City of Utrecht ====
Its location on the banks of the river Rhine allowed Utrecht to become an important trade centre in the Northern Netherlands. The growing town was granted city rights by Henry V at Utrecht on 2 June 1122. When the main flow of the Rhine moved south, the old bed which still flowed through the heart of the town became ever more canalized; and the wharf system was built as an inner city harbour system. On the wharfs, storage facilities (werfkelders) were built, on top of which the main street, including houses, was constructed. The wharves and the cellars are accessible from a platform at water level with stairs descending from the street level to form a unique structure. (Note: Almost all other canal cities in the Netherlands (such as Amsterdam and Delft) have the water in canals bordering directly to the road surface) The relations between the bishop, who controlled many lands outside of the city, and the citizens of Utrecht was not always easy. The bishop, for example, dammed the Kromme Rijn at Wijk bij Duurstede to protect his estates from flooding. This threatened shipping for the city and led the city of Utrecht to commission a canal to ensure access to the town for shipping trade: the Vaartse Rijn, connecting Utrecht to the Hollandse IJssel at IJsselstein.

==== The end of independence ====
In 1528 the bishop lost secular power over both Neder- and Oversticht, which included the city of Utrecht, to Charles V, Holy Roman Emperor. Charles V combined the Seventeen Provinces (the current Benelux and the northern parts of France) as a personal union. This ended the prince-bishopric of Utrecht, as the secular rule was now the lordship of Utrecht, with the religious power remaining with the bishop, although Charles V had gained the right to appoint new bishops. In 1559 the bishopric of Utrecht was raised to archbishopric to make it the religious centre of the Northern ecclesiastical province in the Seventeen Provinces.

The transition from independence to a relatively minor part of a larger union was not easily accepted. To quell uprisings, Charles V struggled to exert his power over the city's citizens who had struggled to gain a certain level of independence from the bishops and were not willing to cede this to their new lord. The heavily fortified castle Vredenburg was built to house a large garrison whose main task was to maintain control over the city. The castle would last less than 50 years before it was demolished in an uprising in the early stages of the Dutch Revolt.

=== Republic of the Netherlands (1579–1806) ===
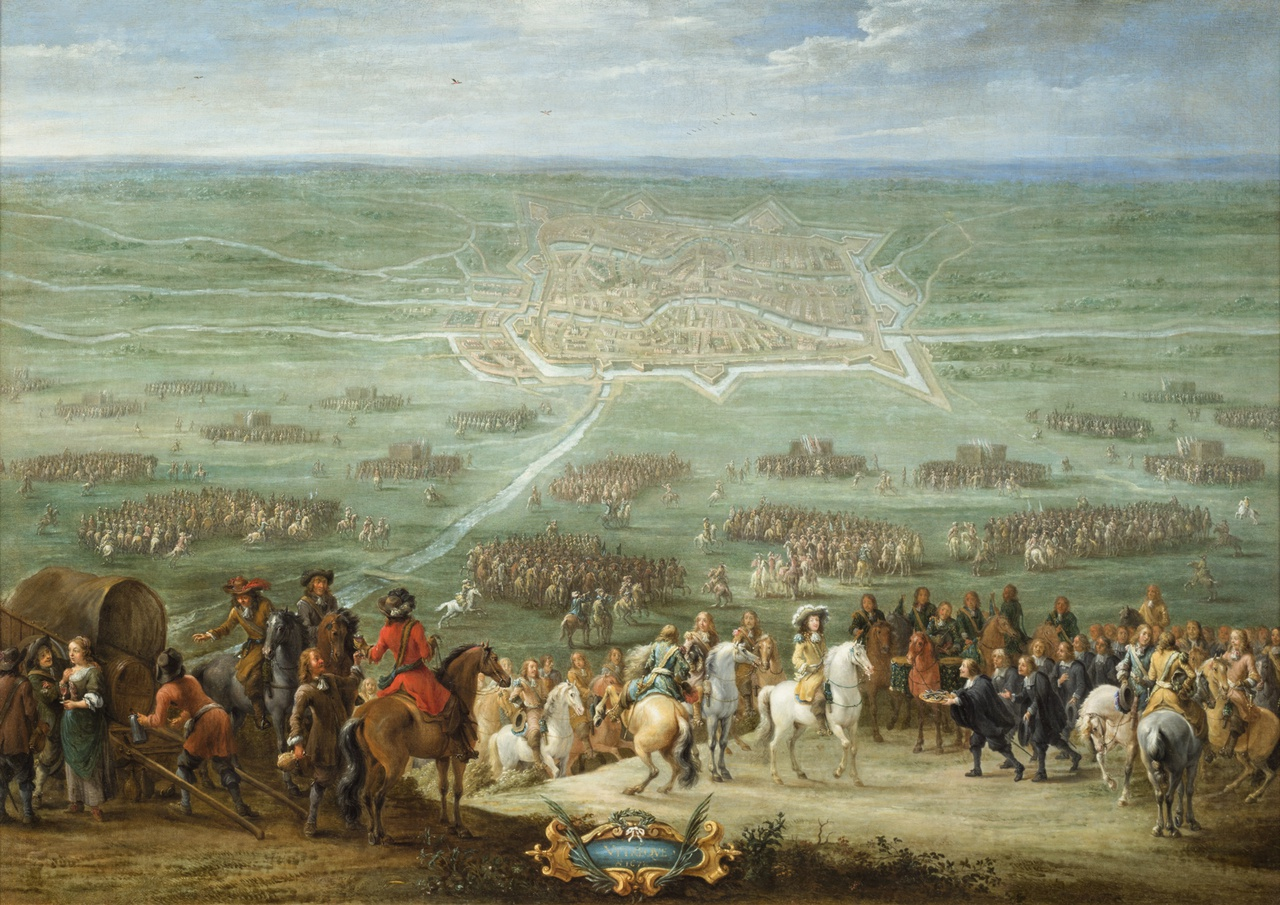
Lambert de Hondt (II): the Surrender of Utrecht on 30 June 1672 to the French king Louis XIV on a white horse, 1672, Centraal Museum Utrecht. The city keys are proffered to him on a cushion.

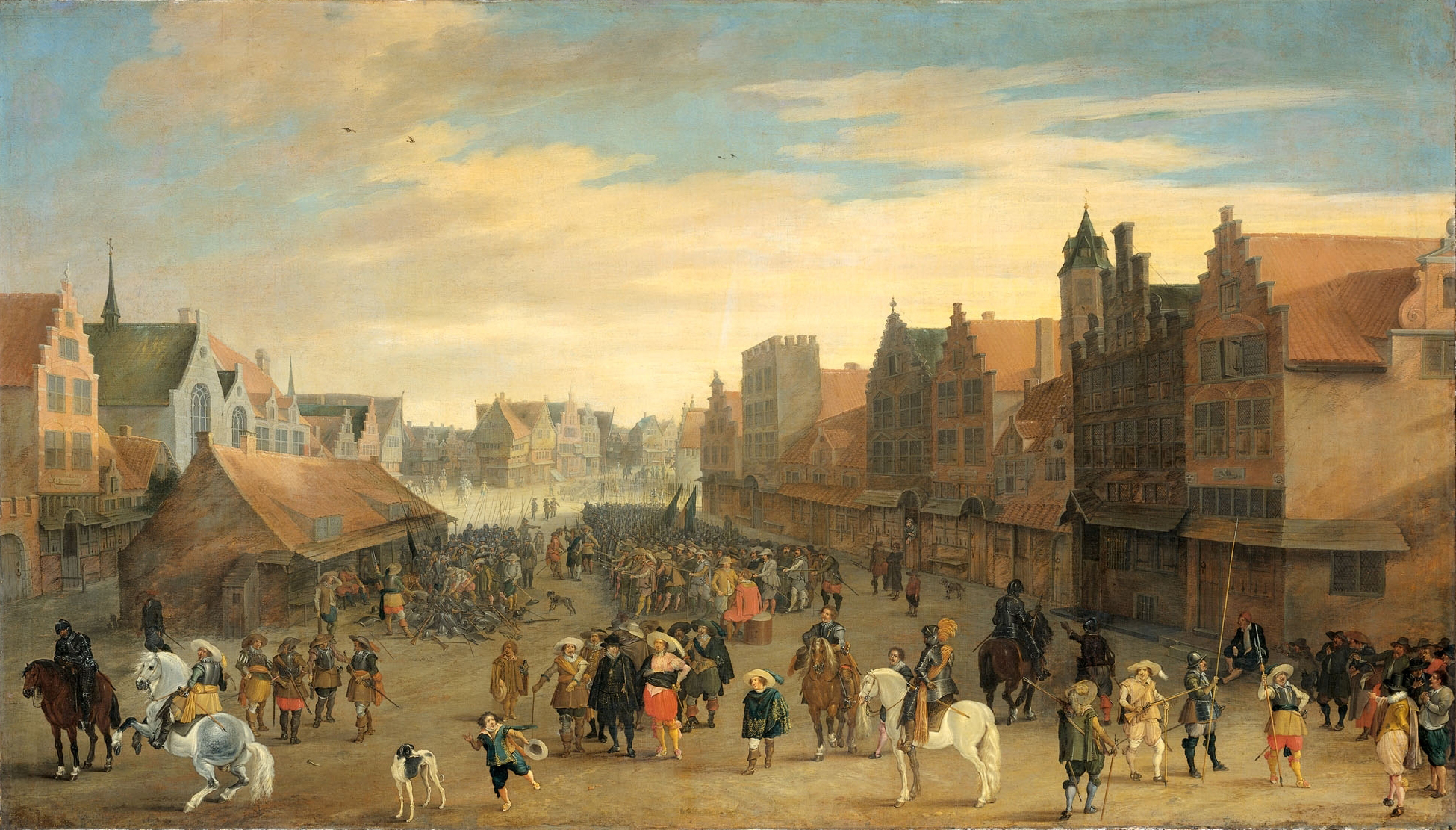
Joost Cornelisz. Droochsloot: The Disbanding of the 'Waardgelders' (Mercenaries in the Pay of the Town Government) by Maurice, Prince of Orange on Neude Square, Utrecht, 31 July 1618. Painting 1625.

In 1579 the northern seven provinces signed the Union of Utrecht treaty (Dutch: Unie van Utrecht), in which they decided to join forces against Spanish rule. The Union of Utrecht is seen as the beginning of the Dutch Republic. In 1580, the new and predominantly Protestant state abolished the bishoprics, including the archbishopric of Utrecht. The stadtholders disapproved of the independent course of the Utrecht bourgeoisie and brought the city under much more direct control of the republic, shifting the power towards its dominant province Holland. This was the start of a long period of stagnation of trade and development in Utrecht. Utrecht remained an atypical city in the new republic being about 40% Catholic in the mid-17th century, and even more so among the elite groups, who included many rural nobility and gentry with town houses there.

The fortified city temporarily fell to the French invasion in 1672 (the Disaster Year, Dutch: Rampjaar). The French invasion was stopped just west of Utrecht at the Old Hollandic Waterline. In 1674, only two years after the French left, the centre of Utrecht was struck by a catastrophic derecho. The halt to building before construction of flying buttresses in the 15th century now proved to be the undoing of the cathedral of St Martin church's central section which collapsed, creating the current Dom square between the tower and choir. In 1713, Utrecht hosted one of the first international peace negotiations when the Treaty of Utrecht settled the War of the Spanish Succession. Beginning in 1723, Utrecht became the centre of the non-Roman Old Catholic Churches.

=== Modern history (1815–present) ===
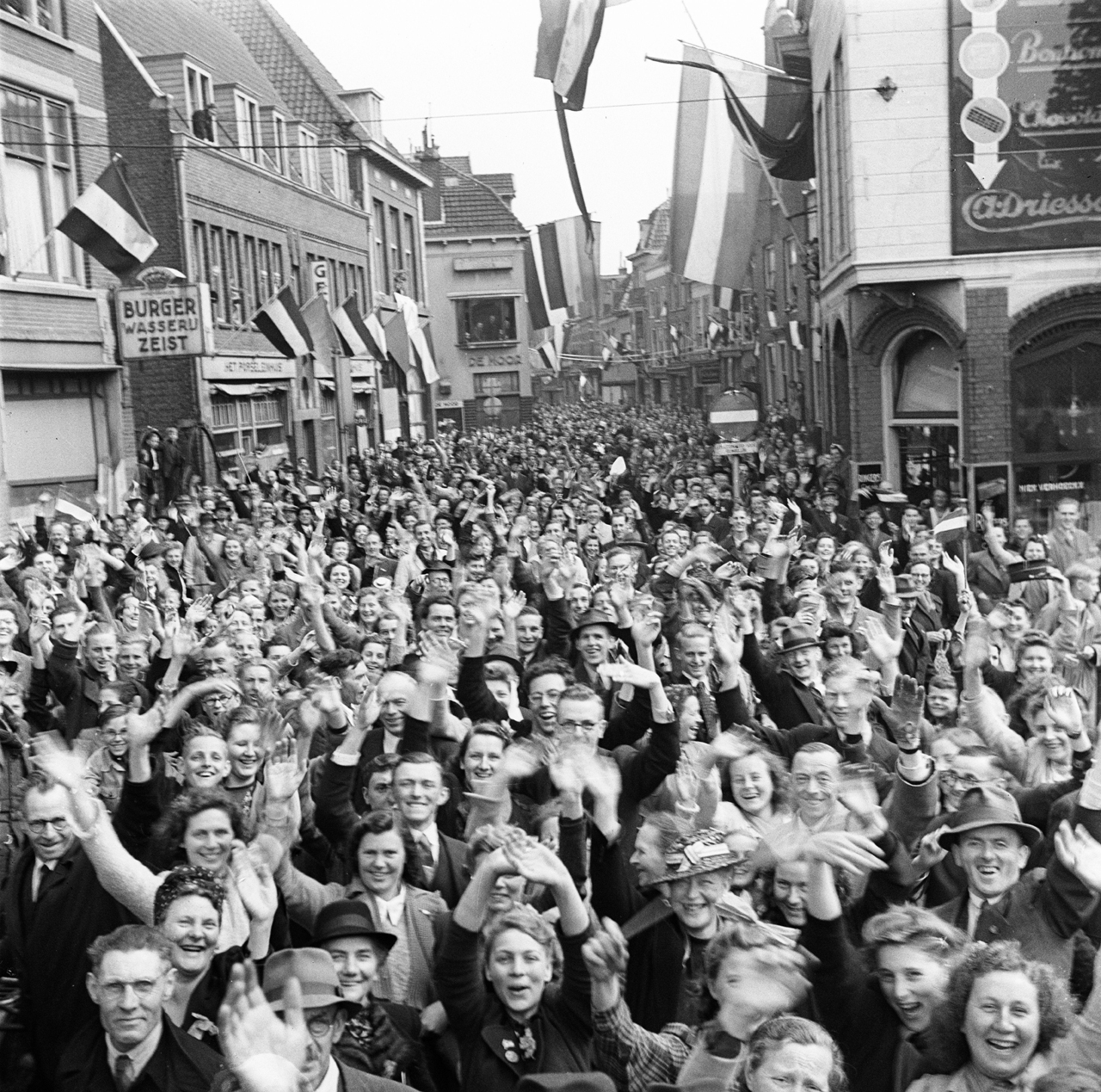
People celebrating the liberation of Utrecht at the end of World War II on 7 May 1945. Amersfoort?

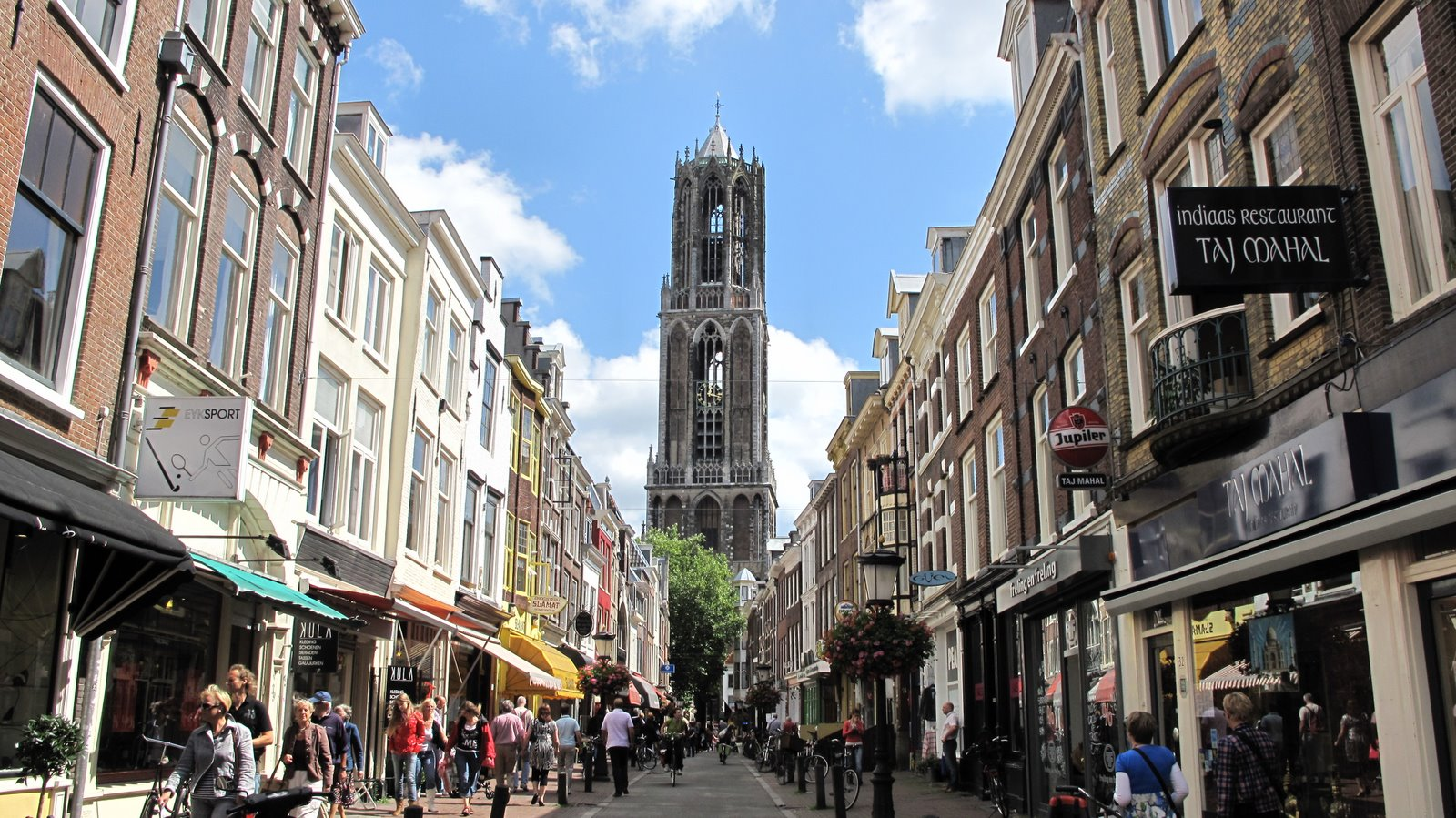
Zadelstraat (Saddlers' Street), Utrecht, with Dom Tower in the background, 2009

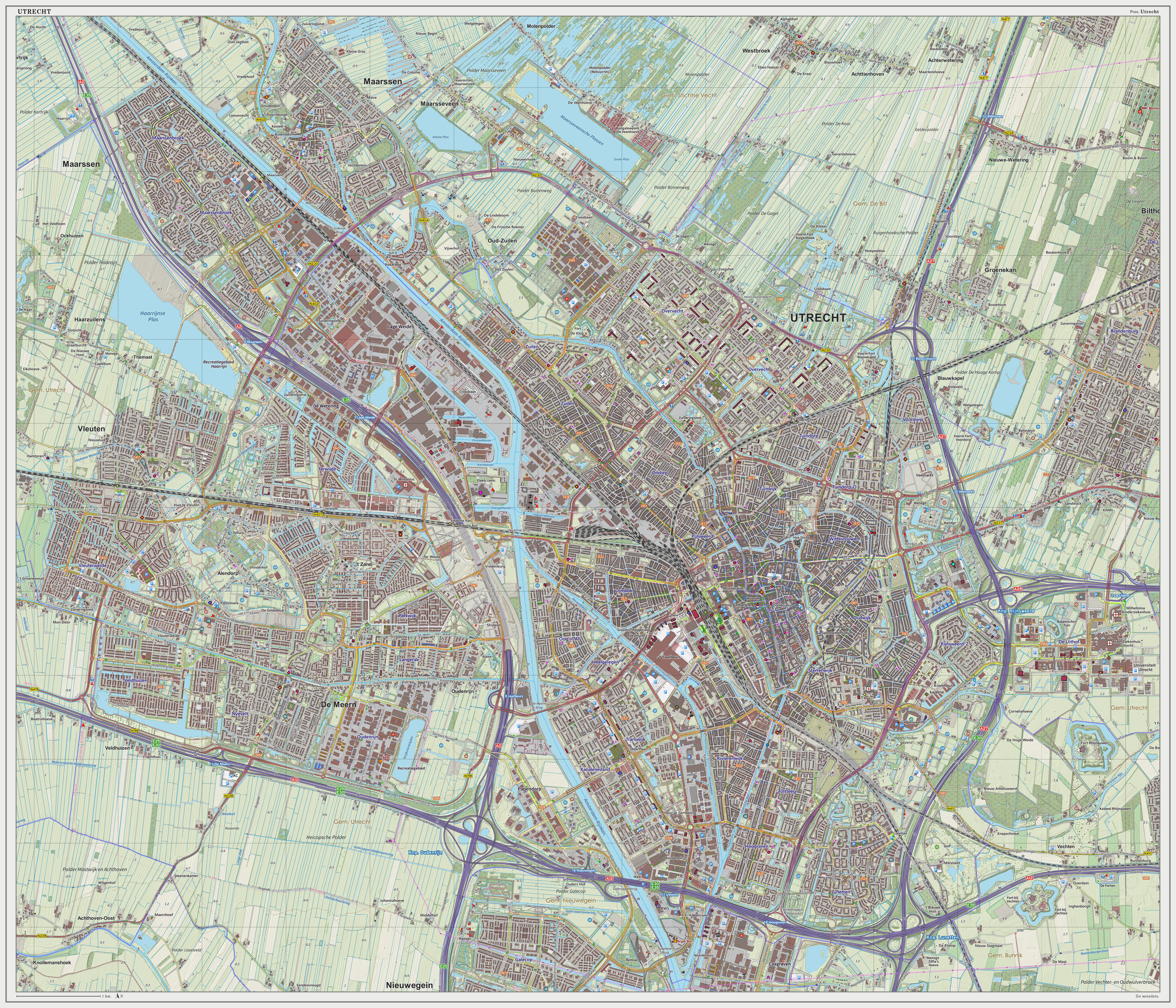
Contemporary map of Utrecht with the new suburb Leidsche Rijn (De Meern) to the left, 2014

In the early 19th century, the role of Utrecht as a fortified town had become obsolete. The fortifications of the Nieuwe Hollandse Waterlinie were moved east of Utrecht. The town walls could now be demolished to allow for expansion. The moats remained intact and formed an important feature of the Zocher plantsoen, an English style landscape park that remains largely intact today. Growth of the city increased when, in 1843, a railway connecting Utrecht to Amsterdam was opened. After that, Utrecht gradually became the main hub of the Dutch railway network. With the Industrial Revolution finally gathering speed in the Netherlands and the ramparts taken down, Utrecht began to grow far beyond its medieval centre. When the Dutch government allowed the bishopric of Utrecht to be reinstated by Rome in 1853, Utrecht became the centre of Dutch Catholicism once more. From the 1880s onward, neighbourhoods such as Oudwijk, Wittevrouwen, Vogelenbuurt to the east, and Lombok to the west were developed. New middle-class residential areas, such as Tuindorp and Oog in Al, were built in the 1920s and 1930s. During this period, several Jugendstil houses and office buildings were built, followed by Rietveld who built the Rietveld Schröder House (1924), and Dudok's construction of the city theatre (1941).

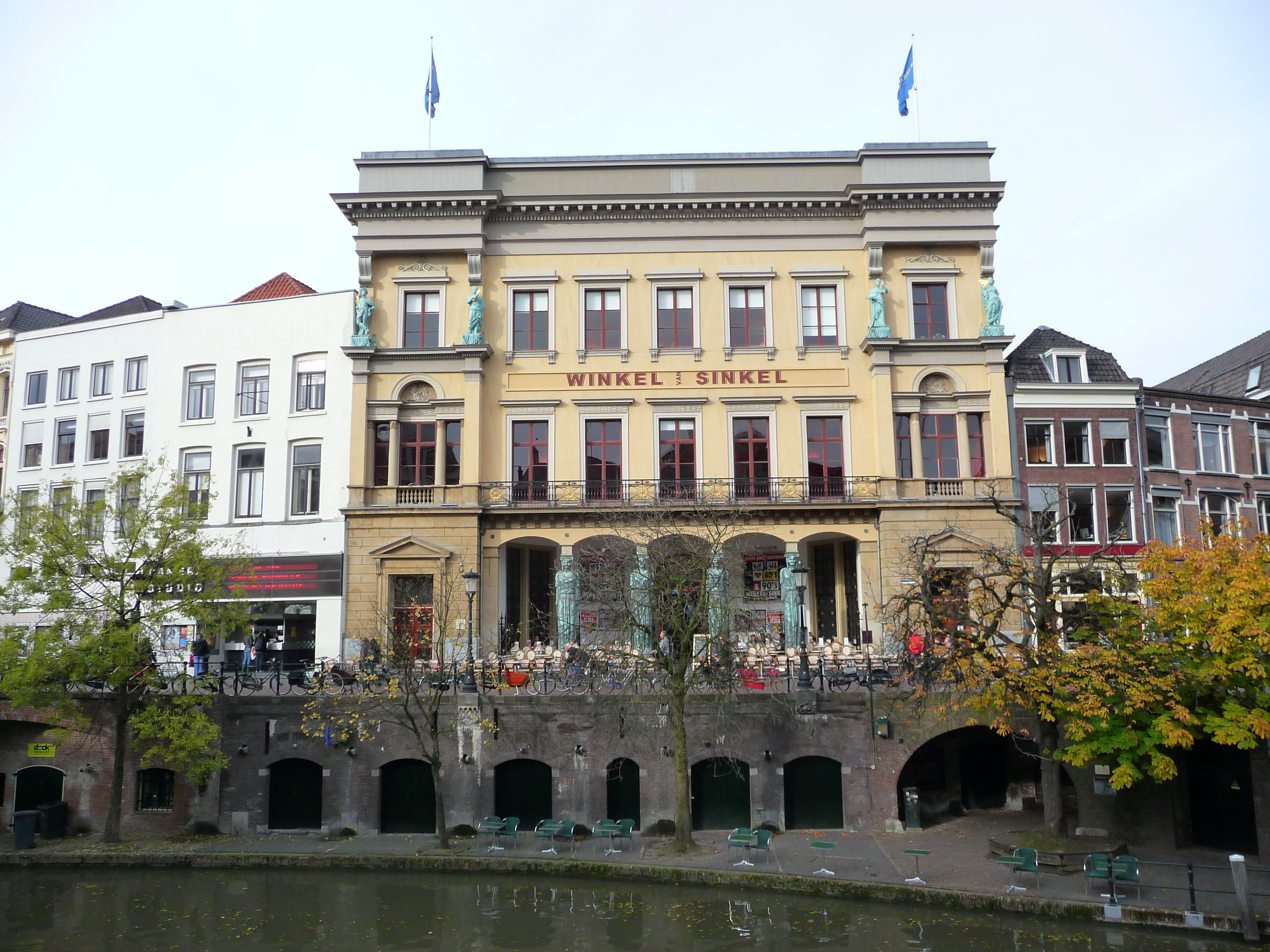
The Winkel van Sinkel, the first department store in the Netherlands. Oudegracht, Utrecht, 2010

During World War II, Utrecht was held by German forces until the general German surrender of the Netherlands on 5 May 1945. British and Canadian troops that had surrounded the city entered it after that surrender, on 7 May 1945. Following the end of World War II, the city grew considerably when new neighbourhoods such as Overvecht, Kanaleneiland, Hoograven and Lunetten were built. Around 2000, the Leidsche Rijn area was developed as an extension of the city to the west.

The area surrounding Utrecht Centraal railway station and the station itself were developed following modernist ideas of the 1960s, in a brutalist style. This development led to the construction of the shopping mall Hoog Catharijne, the music centre Vredenburg (Hertzberger, 1979), and conversion of part of the ancient canal structure into a highway (Catherijnebaan). Protest against further modernisation of the city centre followed even before the last buildings were finalised. In the early 21st century, the whole area is undergoing change again. The redeveloped music centre TivoliVredenburg opened in 2014 with the original Vredenburg and Tivoli concert and rock and jazz halls brought together in a single building.

== Geography ==
=== Climate ===
Utrecht experiences a temperate oceanic climate (Köppen: Cfb) similar to all of the Netherlands.

Climate data for De Bilt
| Month | Jan | Feb | Mar | Apr | May | Jun | Jul | Aug | Sep | Oct | Nov | Dec | Year |
|---|---|---|---|---|---|---|---|---|---|---|---|---|---|
| Record high °C (°F) | 15.1 (59.2) | 18.9 (66.0) | 23.9 (75.0) | 28.9 (84.0) | 33.6 (92.5) | 36.8 (98.2) | 37.5 (99.5) | 35.3 (95.5) | 34.2 (93.6) | 26.7 (80.1) | 18.7 (65.7) | 15.3 (59.5) | 37.5 (99.5) |
| Mean daily maximum °C (°F) | 6.1 (43.0) | 7.0 (44.6) | 10.5 (50.9) | 14.8 (58.6) | 18.3 (64.9) | 20.9 (69.6) | 23.1 (73.6) | 22.9 (73.2) | 19.5 (67.1) | 14.8 (58.6) | 9.9 (49.8) | 6.7 (44.1) | 14.6 (58.3) |
| Daily mean °C (°F) | 3.6 (38.5) | 3.9 (39.0) | 6.5 (43.7) | 9.9 (49.8) | 13.4 (56.1) | 16.1 (61.0) | 18.2 (64.8) | 17.8 (64.0) | 14.7 (58.5) | 10.9 (51.6) | 7.0 (44.6) | 4.2 (39.6) | 10.6 (51.1) |
| Mean daily minimum °C (°F) | 0.9 (33.6) | 0.7 (33.3) | 2.4 (36.3) | 4.5 (40.1) | 8.0 (46.4) | 10.8 (51.4) | 13.0 (55.4) | 12.5 (54.5) | 10.0 (50.0) | 7.1 (44.8) | 3.9 (39.0) | 1.6 (34.9) | 6.3 (43.3) |
| Record low °C (°F) | −24.8 (−12.6) | −21.6 (−6.9) | −14.4 (6.1) | −6.6 (20.1) | −3.7 (25.3) | 0.2 (32.4) | 3.2 (37.8) | 3.8 (38.8) | −0.7 (30.7) | −7.8 (18.0) | −14.4 (6.1) | −16.6 (2.1) | −24.8 (−12.6) |
| Average precipitation mm (inches) | 70.3 (2.77) | 62.7 (2.47) | 57.4 (2.26) | 41.1 (1.62) | 58.9 (2.32) | 70.1 (2.76) | 84.8 (3.34) | 83.1 (3.27) | 77.5 (3.05) | 80.7 (3.18) | 79.7 (3.14) | 83.4 (3.28) | 849.7 (33.45) |
| Average precipitation days (≥ 1 mm) | 12 | 10 | 11 | 9 | 10 | 10 | 10 | 10 | 11 | 12 | 13 | 12 | 131 |
| Average snowy days | 6 | 6 | 4 | 2 | 0 | 0 | 0 | 0 | 0 | 0 | 2 | 5 | 25 |
| Average relative humidity (%) | 87 | 84 | 81 | 75 | 75 | 76 | 77 | 79 | 84 | 86 | 89 | 89 | 82 |
| Mean monthly sunshine hours | 66.6 | 89.6 | 139.4 | 189.2 | 217.5 | 207.1 | 213.9 | 196.3 | 152.8 | 119.3 | 67.4 | 55.5 | 1,714.6 |
Source 1: Royal Netherlands Meteorological Institute (1991–2020 normals, snowy days normals for 1971–2000)
Source 2: Royal Netherlands Meteorological Institute (1901–present extremes)

== Population ==
Utrecht population pyramid in 2022

=== Demographics ===
Historical population

| Year | Pop. | ±% p.a. |
|---|---|---|
| 1400 | 13,000 | — |
| 1481 | 17,250 | +0.35% |
| 1577 | 27,500 | +0.49% |
| 1623 | 30,000 | +0.19% |
| 1670 | 30,000 | +0.00% |
| 1748 | 25,244 | −0.22% |
| 1795 | 32,294 | +0.53% |
| 1900 | 102,086 | +1.10% |
| 1910 | 119,006 | +1.55% |
| 1920 | 138,334 | +1.52% |

| Year | Pop. | ±% p.a. |
|---|---|---|
| 1930 | 153,208 | +1.03% |
| 1940 | 165,029 | +0.75% |
| 1950 | 193,190 | +1.59% |
| 1960 | 254,186 | +2.78% |
| 1970 | 278,966 | +0.93% |
| 1980 | 237,037 | −1.62% |
| 1990 | 230,358 | −0.29% |
| 2000 | 233,667 | +0.14% |
| 2010 | 307,081 | +2.77% |
| 2020 | 357,597 | +1.53% |

Source: Lourens & Lucassen 1997, pp. 87–88 (1400–1795)

The city of Utrecht had a population of 361,924 in 2022. It is a growing municipality, and projections are that the population will surpass 392,000 by 2025.

Utrecht has a young population, with many inhabitants in the age category from 20 and 30 years, due to the presence of a large university. About 52% of the population is female and 48% is male. The majority of households (52.5%) in Utrecht are single-person households. About 29% of people living in Utrecht are either married or have another legal partnership. About 3% of the population of Utrecht is divorced.

=== Inhabitants by origin ===
| 2020 | Numbers | % |
|---|---|---|
| Without recent migration background | 228,502 | 63.9% |
| Western migration background | 43,511 | 12.17% |
| Non-Western migration background | 85,584 | 23.93% |
| Morocco | 31,429 | 8.79% |
| Turkey | 14,210 | 3.97% |
| Indonesia | 7,923 | 2.22% |
| Suriname | 7,771 | 2.17% |
| Netherlands Antilles and Aruba | 2,907 | 0.81% |
| Total | 357,597 | 100% |

For 62.8% of the population of Utrecht, both parents were born in the Netherlands. Approximately 12.4% of the population consists of people with a recent migration background from western countries, while 24.8% of the population has at least one parent who is of 'non-western origin' (8.8% from Morocco, 4% from Turkey, 3% from Surinam and Dutch Caribbean, and 9.1% from other countries).

Population of the city of Utrecht by country of birth of the parents of citizens (2022). Those with a mixed background are counted in the 'non Dutch' groupings.
| Country/Territory | Population |
|---|---|
| Netherlands | 227,343 (62.8%) |
| Morocco | 30,656 (8.8%) |
| Turkey | 13,988 (4%) |
| Indonesia | 8,014 (2.3%) |
| Suriname | 7,827 (3%) |
| Other | 59,655 (20.7%) |

=== Religion ===
Utrecht has been the religious centre of the Netherlands since the 8th century. Currently it is the see of the Metropolitan Archbishop of Utrecht, the most senior Dutch Roman Catholic leader. His ecclesiastical province covers the whole kingdom.

Utrecht is also the see of the archbishop of the Old Catholic Church, titular head of the Union of Utrecht, and the location of the offices of the Protestant Church in the Netherlands, the main Dutch Protestant church.

As of 2013, the largest religion is Christianity with 28% of the population being Christian, followed by Islam with 9.9% in 2016 and Hinduism with 0.8%.

Religions in Utrecht (2013)
1. None (61.0%)
2. Roman Catholic (13.4%)
3. Protestant Church in the Netherlands (10.2%)
4. Other Christian denominations (4.40%)
5. Islam (9.50%)
6. Hinduism (0.80%)
7. Buddhism (0.60%)
8. Judaism (0.10%)

=== Population centres and agglomeration ===
The city of Utrecht is subdivided into 10 city quarters, all of which have their own neighbourhood council and service centre for civil affairs. (Note: The tourist areas in the city are also referred to as "kwartiers" or "quarters": Beureskwartier, Domkwartier, Museumkwartier, Stadhuiskwartier, Universiteitkwartier, and Vredenburgkwartier: Utrecht Marketing, "Official Utrecht Citymap", n.d.)

1. Binnenstad
2. Oost
3. Leidsche Rijn
4. West
5. Overvecht
6. Zuid
7. Noordoost
8. Zuidwest
9. Noordwest
10. Vleuten-De Meern

Abstede (Utrecht-Oost), Catharijne (Utrecht-Binnenstad), Lauwerecht (Utrecht-Noordoost) and Tolsteeg (Utrecht-Zuid) were separate municipalities between 1818 and 1823, when they were merged with Utrecht. Zuilen (Utrecht-Noordwest) was a separate municipality until 1954, when it was merged with Utrecht and the former municipality of Maarssen. Former municipalities Oudenrijn (nowadays part of Utrecht), Jutphaas (nowadays part of Nieuwegein) and Achttienhoven (nowadays part of De Bilt) partially merged with Utrecht in 1954. In 2001, the former municipality of Vleuten-De Meern (a merger between the former municipalities of Vleuten, Haarzuilens, Veldhuizen and Oudenrijn in 1954) merged with Utrecht to become a city part (wijk) of it.

Utrecht is the centre of a densely populated area, a fact which makes concise definitions of its agglomeration difficult, and somewhat arbitrary. The smaller Utrecht agglomeration of continuously built-up areas counts some 420,000 inhabitants and includes Nieuwegein, IJsselstein and Maarssen. It is sometimes argued that the close by municipalities De Bilt, Zeist, Houten, Vianen (Vijfheerenlanden), Driebergen-Rijsenburg (Utrechtse Heuvelrug), and Bunnik should also be counted towards the Utrecht agglomeration, bringing the total to 640,000 inhabitants. The larger region, including slightly more remote cities such as Woerden and Amersfoort, counts up to 820,000 inhabitants.

== Politics ==
Following the 2026 Utrecht municipal election, the municipal council of Utrecht contains sixteen groups, most notably PRO with 14 seats and D66 with 9 seats.

| Group | Seats |
|---|---|
| PRO | 14 / 45 |
| D66 | 9 / 45 |
| VVD | 5 / 45 |
| CDA | 3 / 45 |
| PvdD | 2 / 45 |
| Denk | 2 / 45 |
| Volt | 1 / 45 |
| BIJ1 | 1 / 45 |
| CU | 1 / 45 |
| JA21 | 1 / 45 |
| FvD | 1 / 45 |
| Local parties | 5 / 45 |
Source: Municipal Council

== Cityscape ==
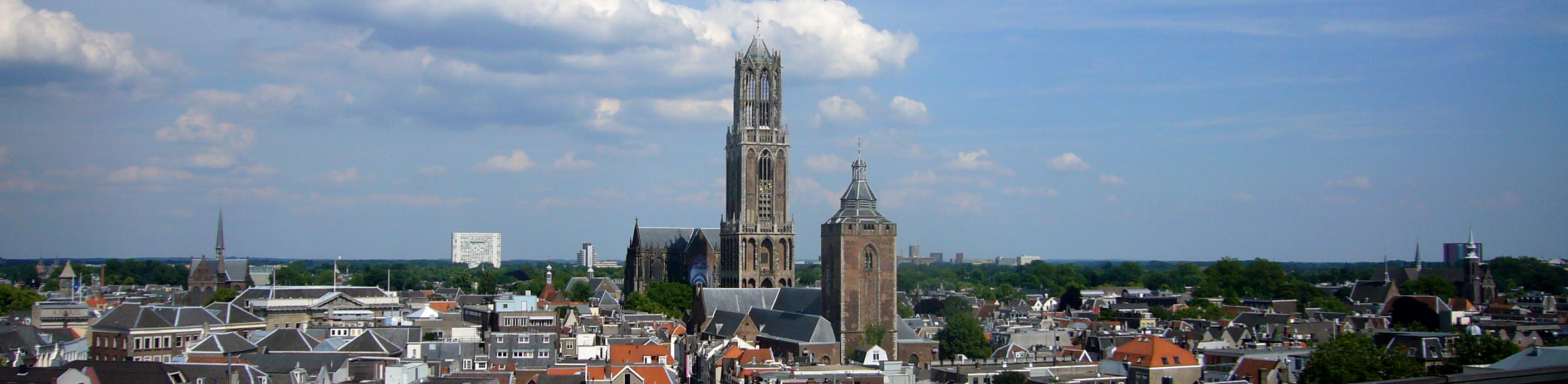
Panorama of Utrecht from the west with Dom Tower and Buurkerk, 2008

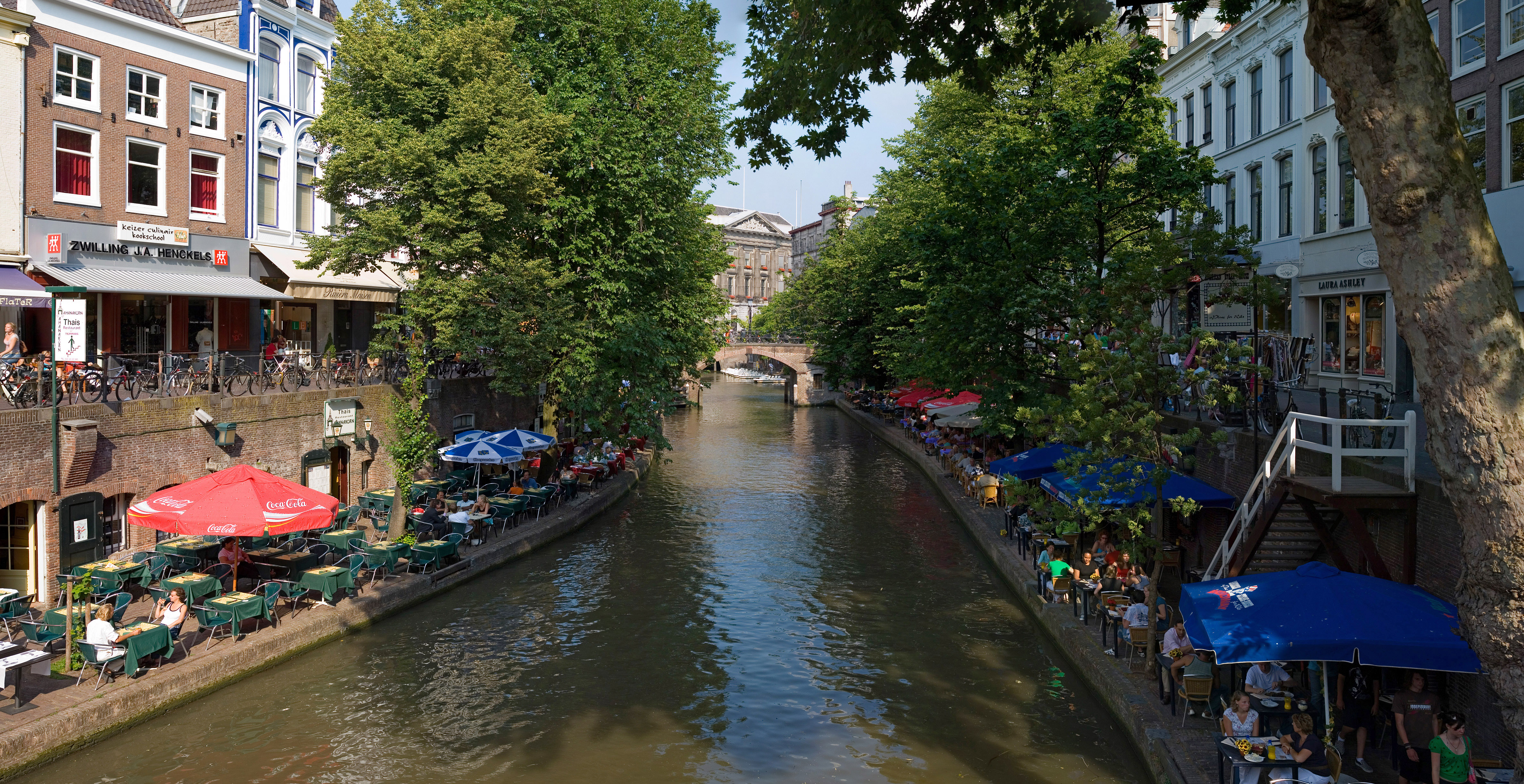
Oudegracht (the 'Old Canal') in central Utrecht, 2006

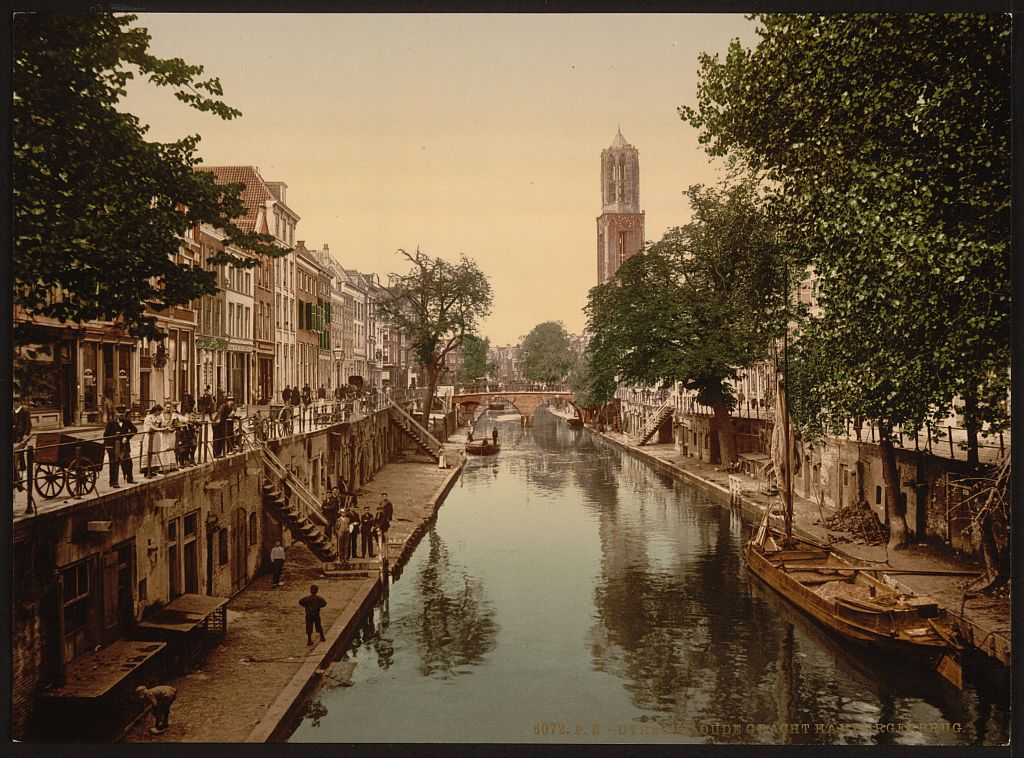
The Oudegracht with Hamburgerbrug (bridge) with Dom Tower seen from the south, Utrecht, in the 1890s

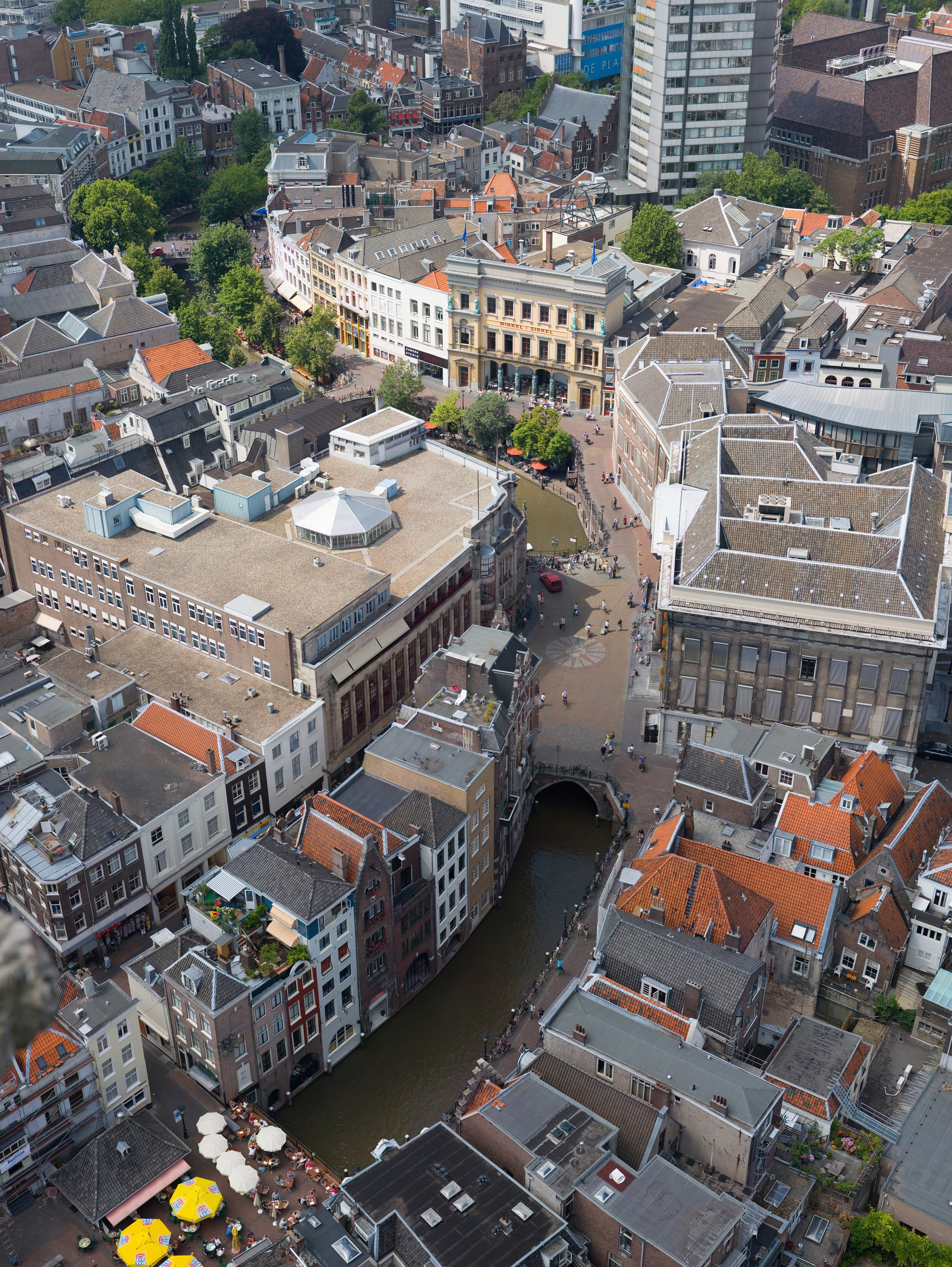
View of the Oudegracht from the Dom Tower, 2006

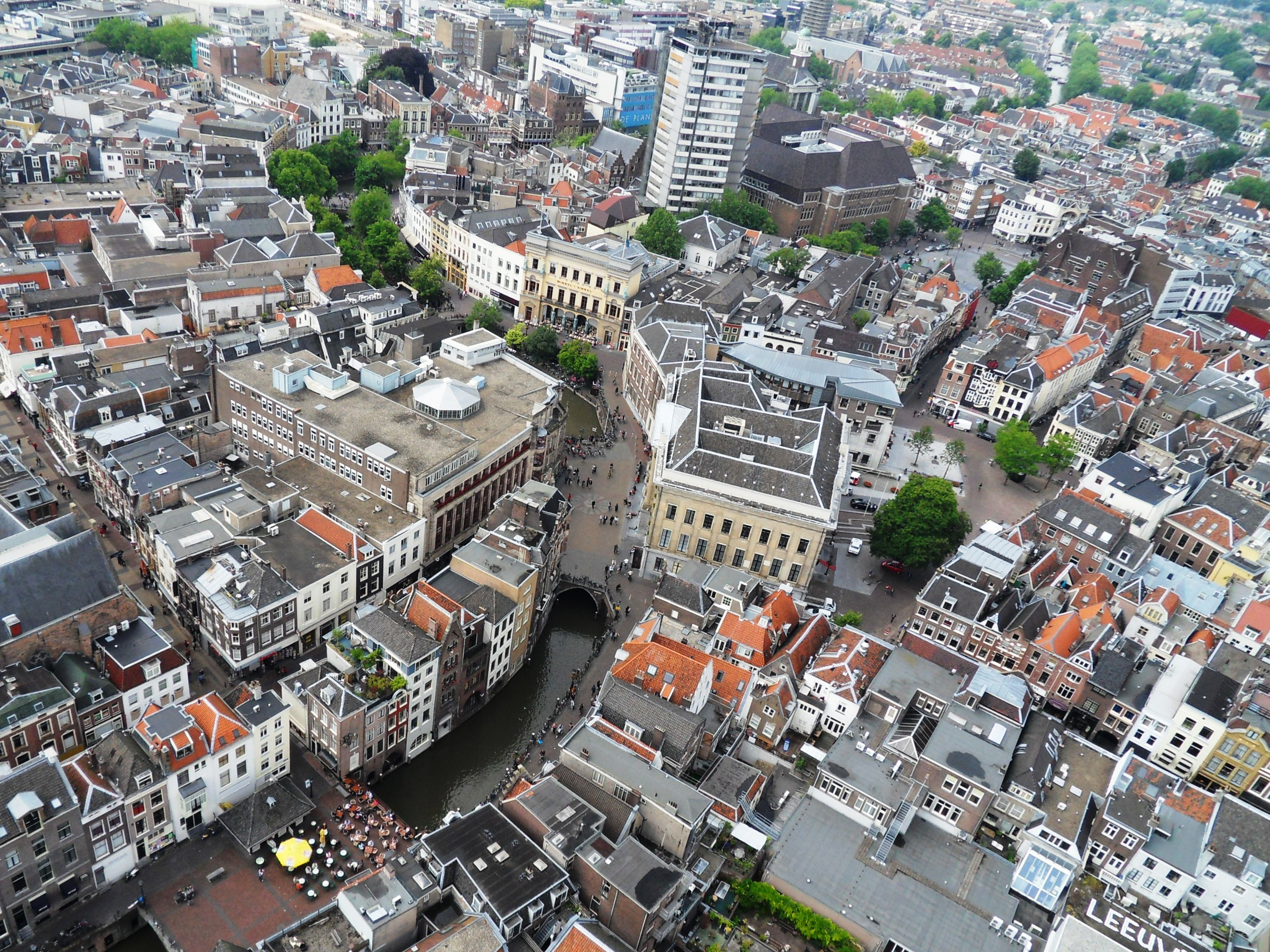
Aerial view of Utrecht from the Dom Tower, 2009

Utrecht's cityscape is dominated by the Dom Tower, the tallest belfry in the Netherlands and originally part of the Cathedral of Saint Martin. An ongoing debate is over whether any building in or near the centre of town should surpass the Dom Tower in height (112 m [367 ft]). Nevertheless, some tall buildings are now being constructed that will become part of the skyline of Utrecht. The second-tallest building of the city, the Rabobank-tower, was completed in 2010 and stands 105 m (344 ft) tall. Two antennas will increase that height to 120 m (394 ft). Two other buildings were constructed around the Nieuw Galgenwaard stadium (2007). These buildings, the 'Kantoortoren Galghenwert' and 'Apollo Residence', stand 85.5 m (280.5 ft) and 64.5 m (211.6 ft) high, respectively. The former Utrecht Main Post Office, built in 1924, is still in the city centre at Neude square, but is now serving as library, see also Utrecht Post Office.

Another landmark is the old centre and the canal structure in the inner city. The Oudegracht is a curved canal, partly following the ancient main branch of the Rhine. It is lined with the unique wharf-basement structures that create a two-level street along the canals. The inner city has largely retained its medieval structure, and the moat ringing the old town is largely intact. In the 1970s part of the moat was converted into a motorway. It was then converted back into a waterway, the work being finished in 2020.

Because of the role of Utrecht as a fortified city, construction outside the medieval centre and its city walls was restricted until the 19th century. Surrounding the medieval core there is a ring of late-19th- and early-20th-century neighbourhoods, with newer neighbourhoods positioned farther out. The eastern part of Utrecht remains fairly open. The Dutch Water Line, moved east of the city in the early 19th century, required open lines of fire, thus prohibiting all permanent constructions until the middle of the 20th century on the east side of the city.

Due to the past importance of Utrecht as a religious centre, several monumental churches were erected, many of which have survived. Most prominent is the Dom Church. Other notable churches include the romanesque St Peter's and St John's churches; the gothic churches of St James and St Nicholas; and the Buurkerk, now converted into a museum for automatically playing musical instruments.

== Transport ==
=== Public transport ===
Because of its central location, Utrecht is well connected to the rest of the Netherlands and has a well-developed public transport network.

==== Heavy rail ====
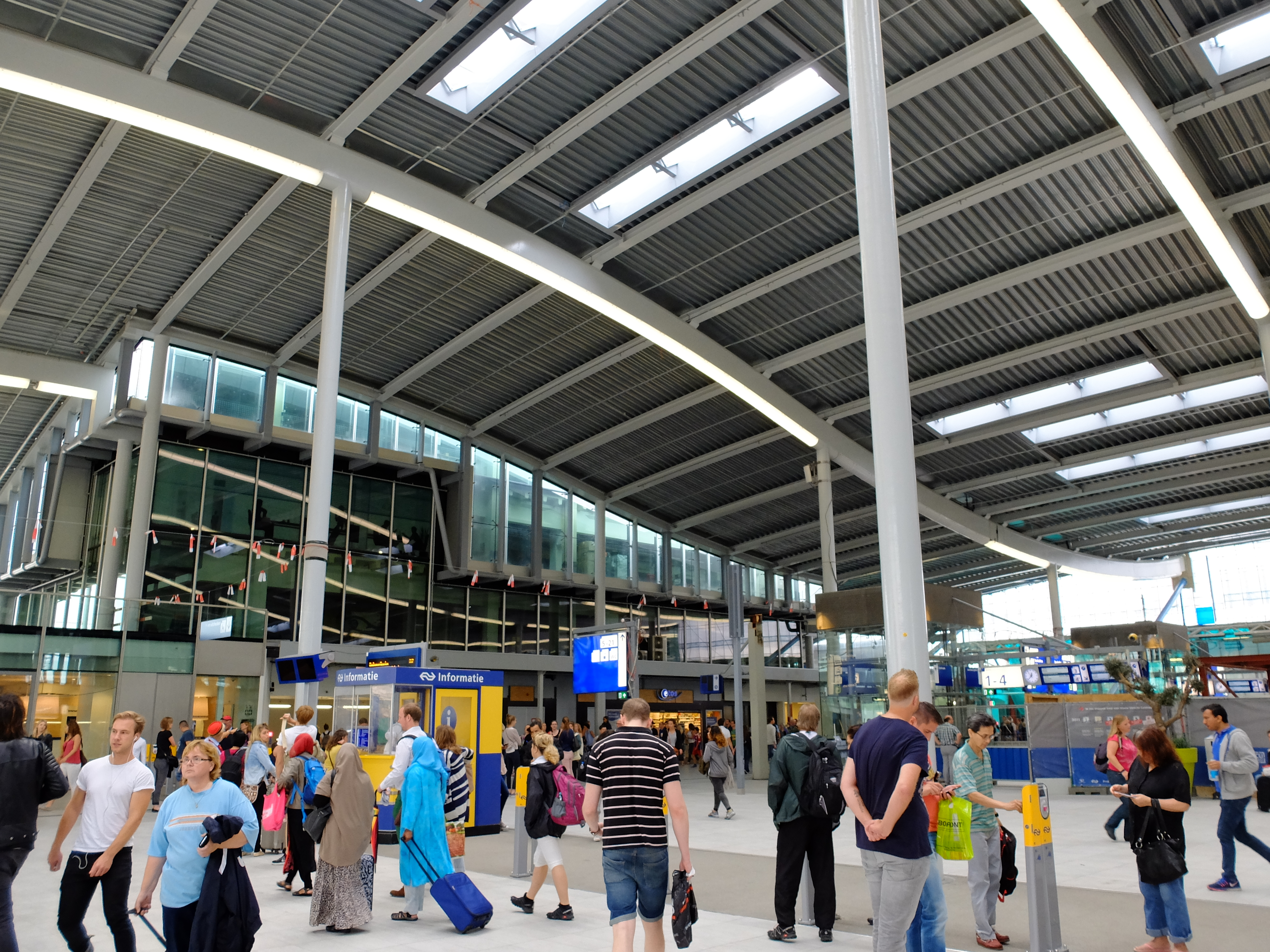
Utrecht Centraal railway station. The renovated hall with its warped roof, 2015.

Utrecht Centraal is the main railway station of Utrecht and is the largest in the country. There are regular intercity services to all major Dutch cities, including direct services to Schiphol Airport. Utrecht Centraal is a station on the night service, providing an all-night service to (among others) Schiphol Airport, Amsterdam and Rotterdam, seven days a week. International InterCityExpress (ICE) services to Germany through Arnhem call at Utrecht Centraal. Regular local trains to all areas surrounding Utrecht also depart from Utrecht Centraal; and service several smaller stations: Utrecht Lunetten; Utrecht Vaartsche Rijn; Utrecht Overvecht; Utrecht Leidsche Rijn; Utrecht Terwijde; Utrecht Zuilen and Vleuten. A former station Utrecht Maliebaan closed in 1939 and has since been converted into the Dutch Railway Museum.

Utrecht is the location of the headquarters of Nederlandse Spoorwegen (English: Dutch Railways), the largest rail operator in the Netherlands, and ProRail, the state-owned company responsible for the construction and maintenance of the country's rail infrastructure.

==== Light rail ====
The Utrecht sneltram is a light rail system with three routes connecting Utrecht Centraal railway station to the suburbs of IJsselstein and Nieuwegein, as well as the Utrecht Science Park district. The sneltram began operations in 1983 and is currently operated under the U-OV brand by the private transport company Qbuzz. The system has a total length of 18.3 km and 54 trainsets, carrying over 9 million riders in 2023.

Utrecht is the only city among the four largest in the Netherlands (the others being Amsterdam, The Hague, and Rotterdam) to award a public transportation concession by tender. Qbuzz will hold the current concession until December 2025, after which Transdev will assume operations until 2035.

==== Bus transport ====
Utrecht Centraal railway station also serves local and regional buses at its west side (Centrumzijde) and at its east side (Jaarbuursplein), where both sides have connections to the Utrecht sneltram. Fifty local bus routes are operated by Qbuzz under the U-OV brand until December 2025 when Transdev will take over the concession. The local bus fleet is one of Europe's cleanest, using only buses compliant with the Euro-VI standard as well as electric buses for inner-city transport. The plan is that all buses be zero-emission by 2028. Regional buses from the city are operated by Arriva.

The Utrecht Centraal railway station is also served by FlixBus. It acts as departure and arrival place of many coach companies serving holiday resorts in Spain and France—and during winter in Austria and Switzerland.

=== Cycling ===
Like most Dutch cities, Utrecht has an extensive network of cycle paths, making cycling safe and popular. 51% of journeys within the city are by bicycle, more than any other mode of transport. Bicycles are used by young and old people, and by individuals and families. They are mostly traditional, upright, steel-framed bicycles, with few gears. There are also bucket bikes for carrying cargo such as groceries or small children. Thanks in part to the access provided by bicycles, 100% of the population lives in a 15-minute city and more than 90% can get to the major destination types within 10 minutes.

In 2014, the city council decided to build the world's largest bicycle parking station, near the Central Railway Station. This three-floor construction cost over €30 million and can hold 12,500 bicycles. The bicycle parking station was built in stages, with the first part opening in August 2017, and the final section (after some delay) being opened on 19 August 2019.

=== Road transport ===
Utrecht is well-connected to the Dutch road network. Two of the most important major roads serve the city of Utrecht: the A12 and A2 motorways connect Amsterdam, Arnhem, The Hague and Maastricht, as well as Belgium and Germany. Other major motorways in the area are the Almere–Breda A27 and the Utrecht–Groningen A28. Due to the increasing traffic and the ancient city plan, traffic congestion is a common phenomenon in and around Utrecht, causing elevated levels of air pollutants. This has led to a passionate debate in the city about the best way to improve the city's air quality.

=== Shipping ===
Utrecht has an industrial port located on the Amsterdam-Rijnkanaal. The container terminal has a capacity of 80,000 containers a year. In 2003, the port facilitated the transport of four million tons of cargo; mostly sand, gravel, fertiliser and fodder. Additionally, some tourist boat trips are organised from various places on the Oudegracht; and the city is connected to touristic shipping routes through sluices.

== Economy ==
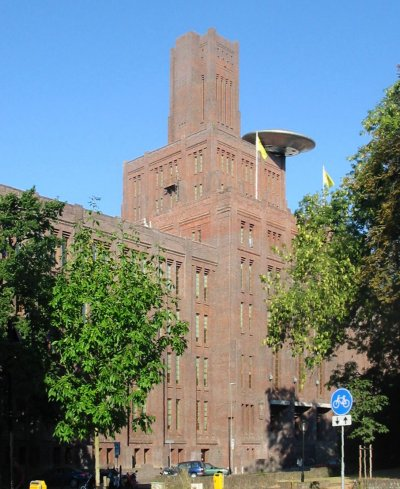
'De Inktpot' ("The Inkpot") with artificial UFO sculpture by Marc Ruygrok, 1999. Photo 2003

Production industry constitutes a small part of the economy of Utrecht. The economy of Utrecht depends for a large part on the several large institutions located in the city. It is the centre of the Dutch railway network and the location of the head office of Nederlandse Spoorwegen. ProRail is headquartered in De Inktpot (The Inkwell), the largest brick building in the Netherlands (the "UFO" featured on its façade stems from an art programme in 2000). Rabobank, a large bank, has its headquarters in Utrecht.

Utrecht is also informally considered the "capital" of the Dutch games industry. It was named by Business Finland in 2023 as one of several capitals for the European games industry as a whole. Utrecht's influence in this field was caused by video game development courses at its universities, which were the first such courses in Europe when launched in 2002. Since 2008 Utrecht has also been home to the studio incubator programme Dutch Game Garden, which has launched a number of studios in the area. By 2014 the programme had created 200 jobs. Utrecht is also home to Nixxes Software (a PlayStation Studios subsidiary) as well as Sokpop Collective.

== Education ==
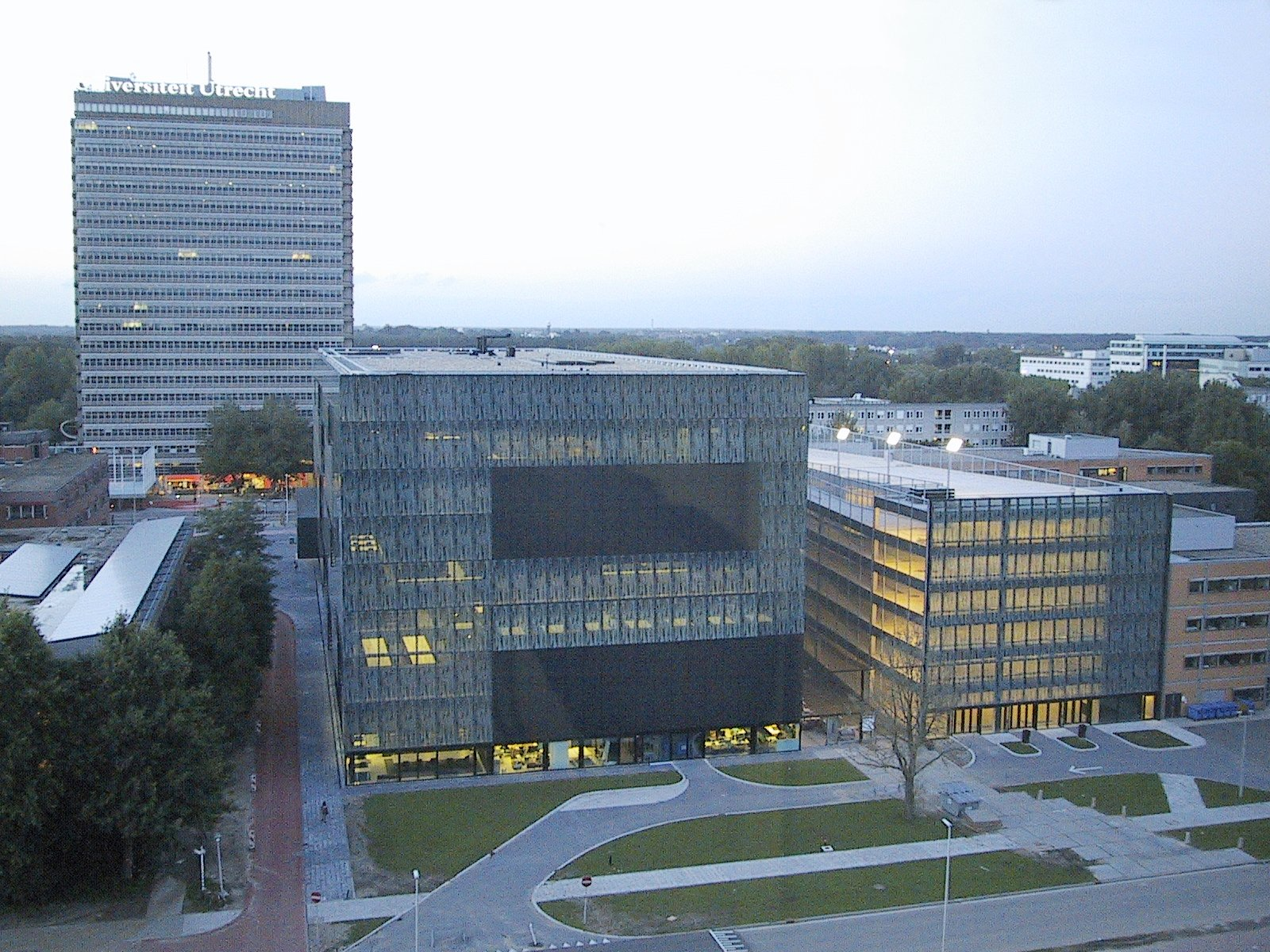
View on the Science Park campus of Utrecht University with the university library (centre), 2004

Utrecht hosts several large institutions of higher education. The most prominent of these is Utrecht University (est. 1636), the largest university in the Netherlands with 30,449 students (as of 2012). The university is partially based in the inner city as well as in the Utrecht Science Park campus area, on the east side of the city. According to Shanghai Jiaotong University's university ranking in 2014, it is the 57th best university in the world. Utrecht also houses the much smaller University of Humanistic Studies, which houses about 400 students.

Utrecht is home of one of the locations of TIAS School for Business and Society, focused on post-experience management education and the largest management school of its kind in the Netherlands. In 2008, its executive MBA program was rated the 24th best program in the world by the Financial Times.

Utrecht is also home to two other large institutions of higher education: the vocational university Hogeschool Utrecht (37,000 students), with locations in the city and the Uithof campus; and the HKU Utrecht School of the Arts (3,000 students).

There are many schools for primary and secondary education, allowing parents to select from different philosophies and religions in the school, as is inherent in the Dutch school system.

== Culture ==
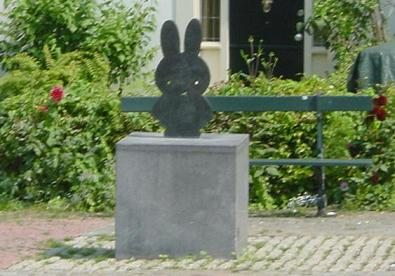
Miffy statue by Henk Evertzen, Nijntjepleintje (Miffy small square), Utrecht, 2006

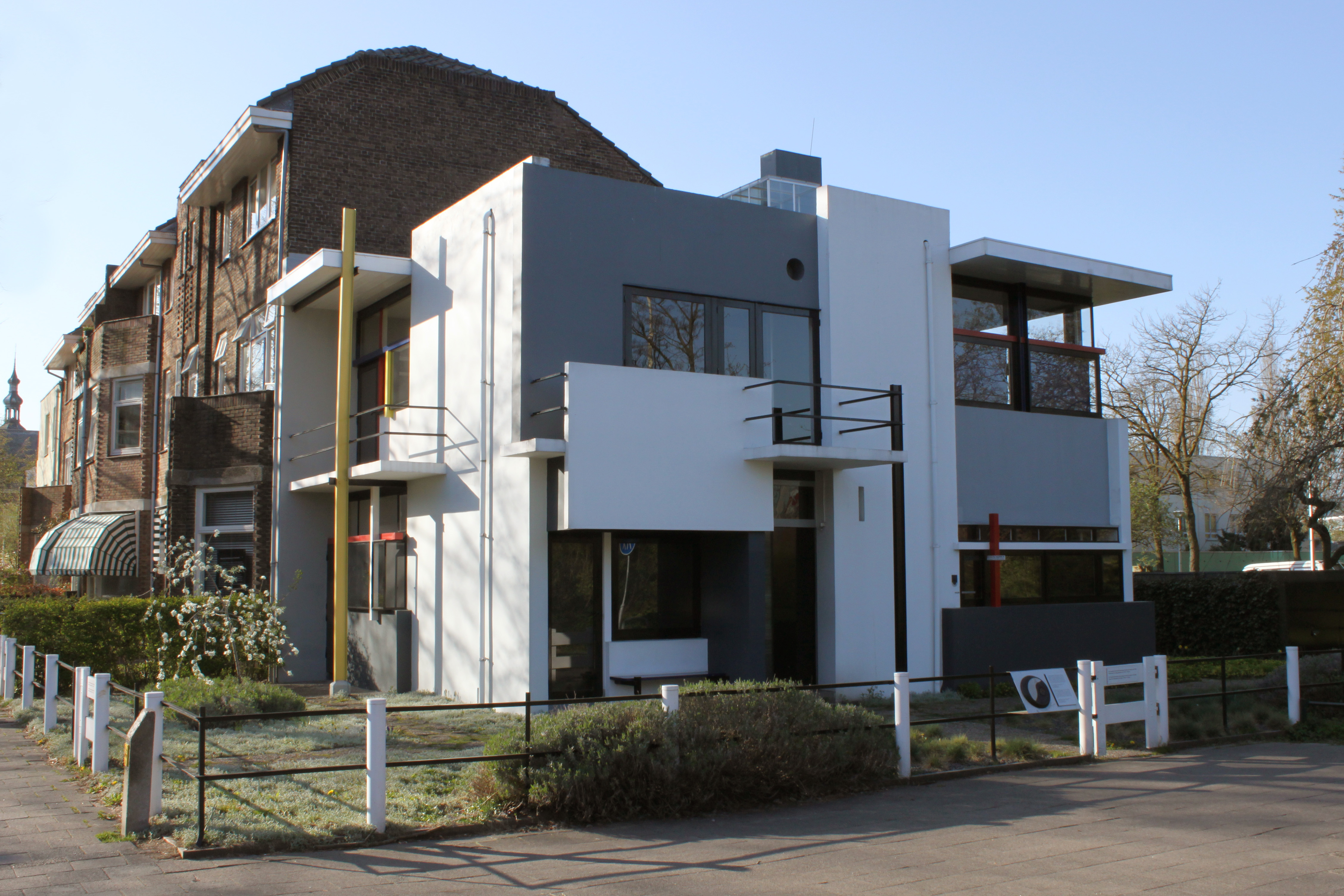
The Rietveld Schröder House from 1924, photo 2010

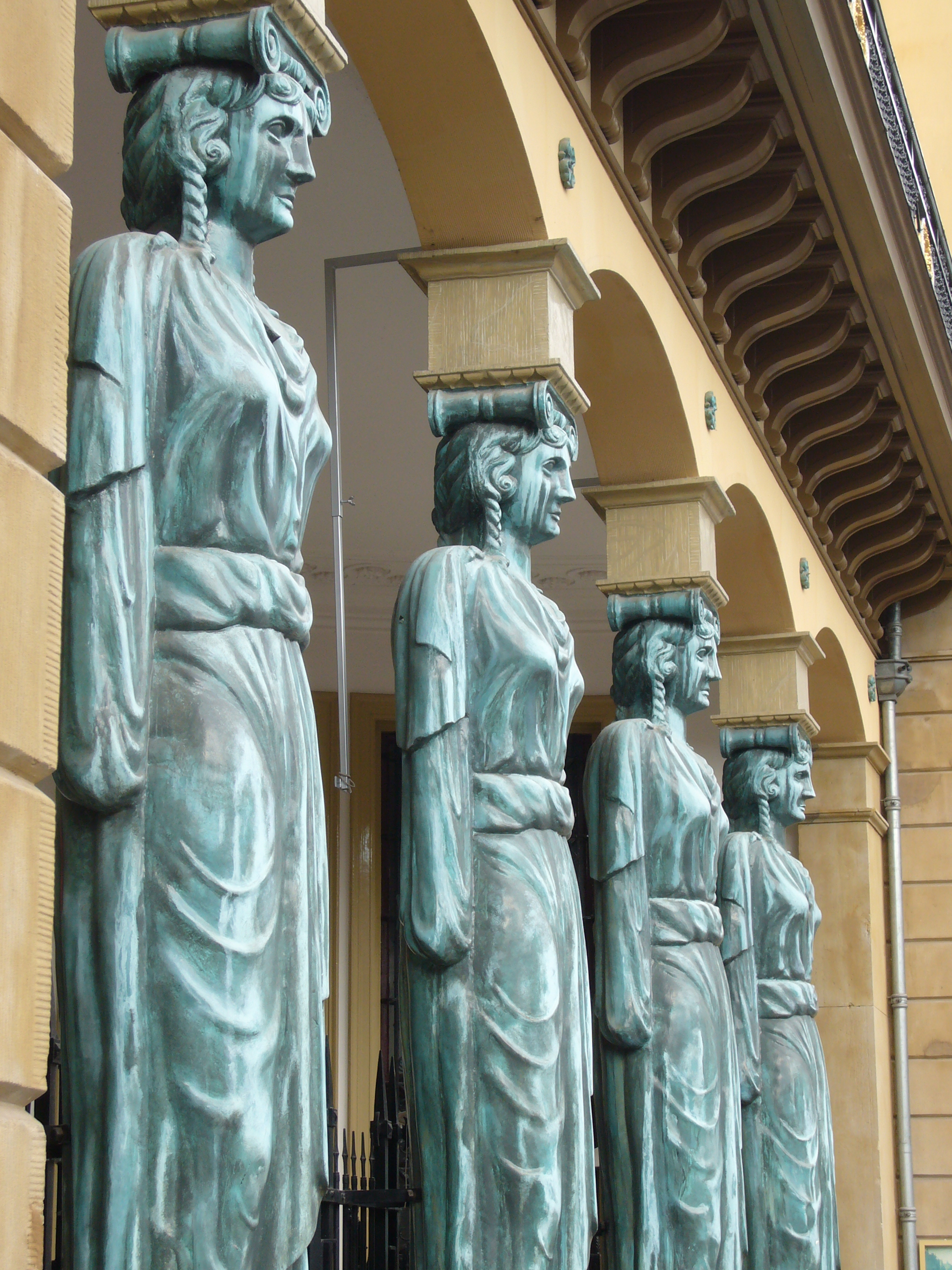
Caryatids on the façade of the Winkel van Sinkel, Oudegracht, Utrecht, 2008

The city of Utrecht has an active cultural life, and in the Netherlands is second only to Amsterdam. There are several theatres and theatre companies. The 1941 main city theatre was built by Dudok. In addition to theatres, there is a large number of cinemas, including three arthouse cinemas. Utrecht is host to the international Early Music Festival (Festival Oude Muziek, for music before 1800) and the Netherlands Film Festival. The city has an important classical music hall, Vredenburg (1979 by Herman Hertzberger). Its acoustics are considered among the best of the 20th-century original music halls. The original Vredenburg music hall has been redeveloped as part of the larger station area redevelopment plan and in 2014 gained additional halls that allowed its merger with the rock club Tivoli and the SJU jazzpodium. There are several other venues for music throughout the city. Young musicians are educated in the conservatory, a department of the Utrecht School of the Arts. There is a specialised museum of automatically playing musical instruments.

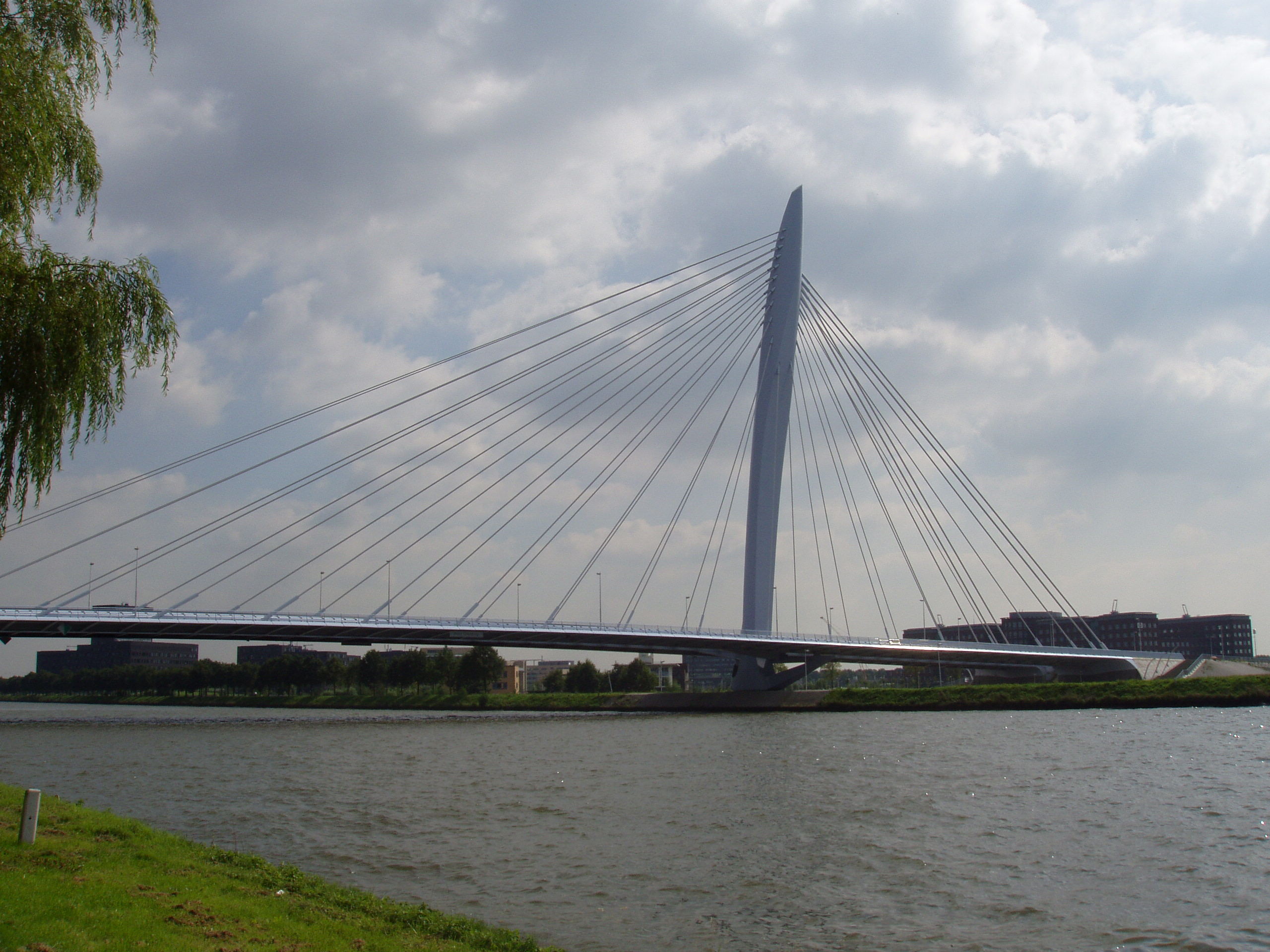
Prins Clausbrug (Prince Claus Bridge) across the Amsterdam-Rhine Canal, Utrecht, 2005

There are many art galleries in Utrecht. There are also several foundations to support art and artists. Training of artists is done at the Utrecht School of the Arts. The Centraal Museum has many exhibitions on the arts, including a permanent exhibition on the works of Utrecht resident illustrator Dick Bruna, who is best known for creating Miffy ("Nijntje", in Dutch). BAK, [Dutch: "Basis voor Actuele Kunst," Basis for Contemporary Art] offers contemporary art exhibitions and public events, as well as a Fellowship program for practitioners involved in contemporary arts, theory and activisms. Although street art is illegal in Utrecht, the Utrechtse Kabouter, a picture of a gnome with a red hat, became a common sight in 2004. Utrecht also houses one of the landmarks of modern architecture, the 1924 Rietveld Schröder House, which is listed on UNESCO's World Heritage Sites.

Every Saturday, a paviour adds another letter to The Letters of Utrecht, an endless poem in the cobblestones of the Oude Gracht in Utrecht. With the Letters, Utrecht has a social sculpture as a growing monument created for the benefit of future people.

To promote culture, Utrecht city organizes cultural Sundays. During a thematic Sunday, several organisations create a program which is open to everyone without, or with a substantially reduced, admission fee. There are also initiatives for amateur artists. The city subsidises an organisation for amateur education in arts aimed at all inhabitants (Utrechts Centrum voor de Kunsten), as does the university for its staff and students. Additionally there are also several private initiatives. The city council provides coupons for discounts to inhabitants who receive welfare to be used with many of the initiatives.

In 2017, Utrecht was named a UNESCO City of Literature. In 2025 the national literature museum will move from the Hague to Utrecht.

=== Sports ===
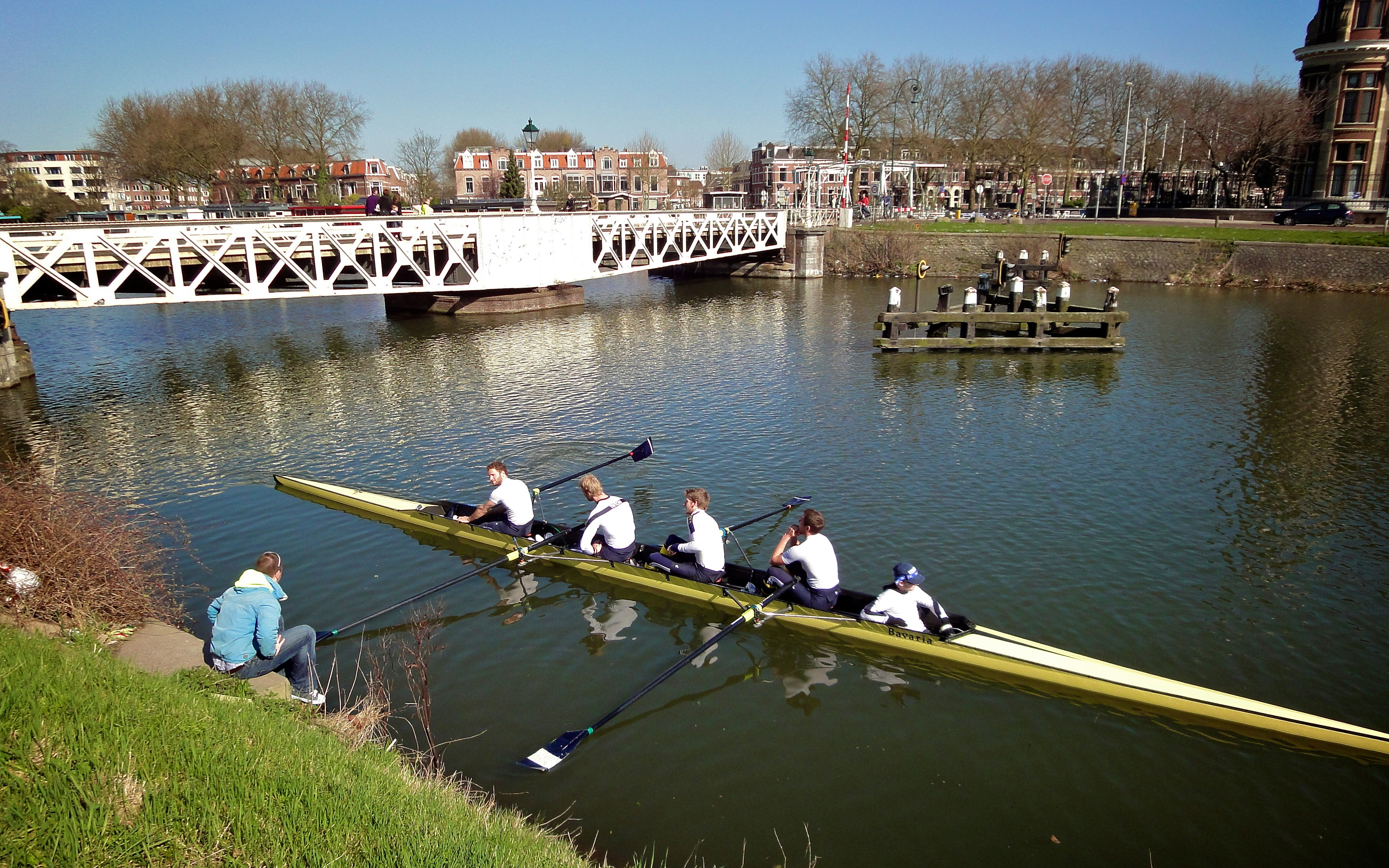
Triton rowing club team pauses with their coach by the Muntbrug, a rotating bridge built in 1887.

Utrecht is home to the premier league (professional) football club FC Utrecht, which plays in Stadium Nieuw Galgenwaard. It is also the home of Kampong, the largest (amateur) sportsclub in the Netherlands (4,500 members), SV Kampong. Kampong features field hockey, association football, cricket, tennis, squash and boules. Kampong's men and women top hockey squads play in the highest Dutch hockey league, the Rabohoofdklasse. Utrecht is also home to baseball and softball club UVV, which plays in the highest Dutch baseball league: de Hoofdklasse. The rugby culture in Utrecht is carried by the USRS, that has been playing in the highest leagues of the Dutch rugby pyramid since 1967. Utrecht's waterways are used by several rowing clubs. Viking is a large club open to the general public, and the student clubs Orca and Triton compete in the Varsity each year.

In July 2013, Utrecht hosted the European Youth Olympic Festival, in which more than 2,000 young athletes competed in nine Olympic sports. In July 2015, Utrecht hosted the Grand Départ and first stage of the Tour de France.

=== Museums ===
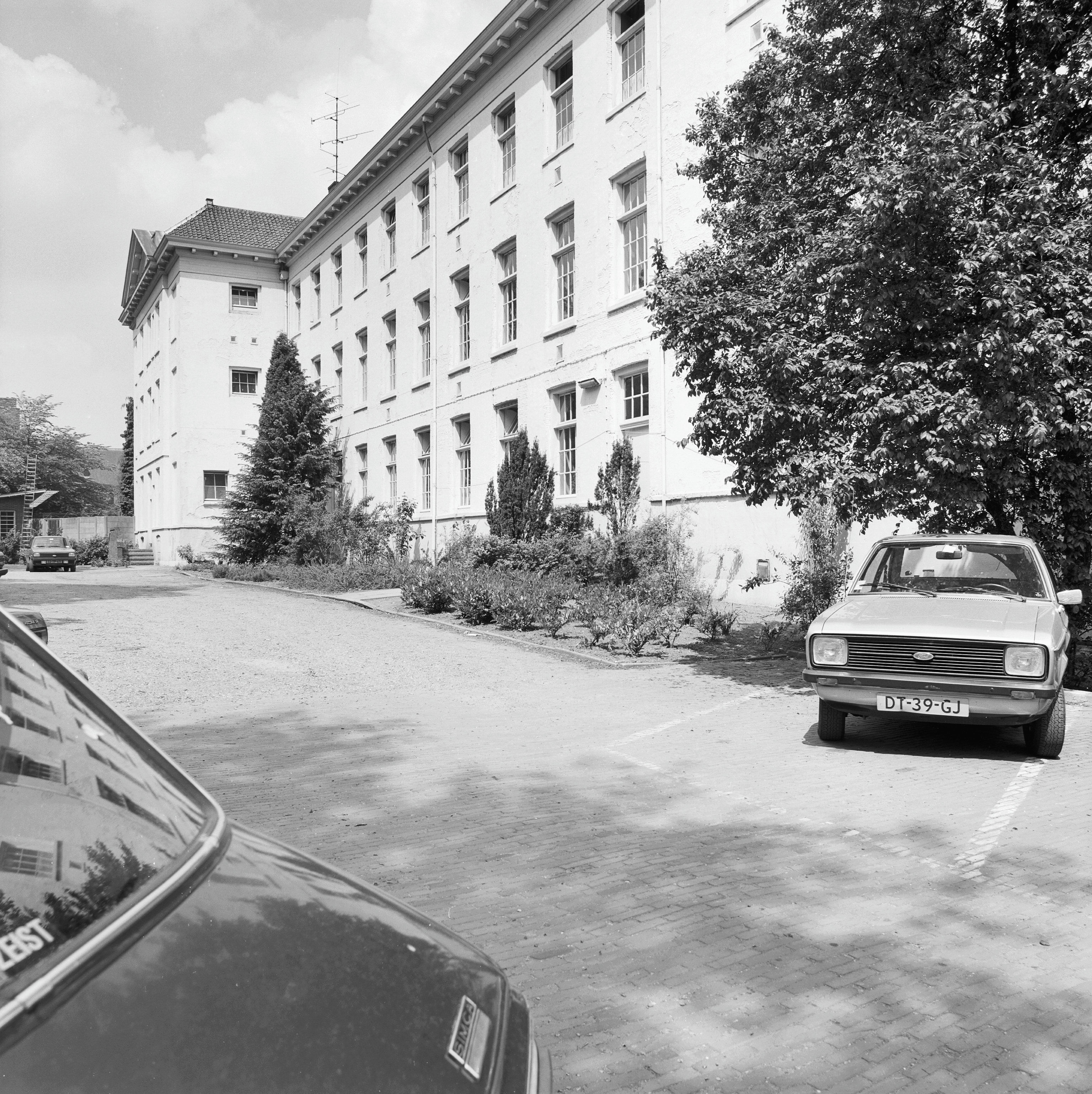
Duitse Huis in April 1982

Utrecht has several smaller and larger museums. Many of those are located in the southern part of the old town, the Museumkwartier (Museum Quarter).

- Aboriginal Art Museum, located at the Oudegracht and closed since 15 June 2017, this museum had a small exhibit of Australian Aboriginal Art
- BAK, basis voor actuele kunst, an international platform for theoretically informed, politically driven art and experimental research
- Centraal Museum: located in the Museum Quarter, this municipal museum has a large collection of art, design, and historical artifacts;
  - Dick Bruna huis, art of Centraal Museum on this separate location is dedicated to Miffy creator Dick Bruna.
- Duitse Huis has a collection of historical items including many charters with seals dating from as far back as the early 13th century and a collection of medieval coins.
- Museum Catharijneconvent, Museum of the Catholic Church shows the history of Christian culture and arts in the Netherlands;
- Museum Speelklok National Museum in the centre of the city, displays several centuries of mechanical musical instruments;
- Railway Museum (Nederlands Spoorwegmuseum) Railway sponsored museum on the history of the Dutch railways;
- Utrecht Archives, are located at Hamburgerstraat 28 in Utrecht;
- Utrecht university museum Utrecht University museum includes the ancient botanical garden;
- Volksbuurtmuseum Wijk C
- Sonnenborgh Observatory observatory and museum that regularly hosts lectures on astronomy, located at Zonnenburg 2 in Utrecht;
- Betje Boerhave Museum museum for the grocer's shop where people can buy old-fashioned food and non-food items, located at Hoogt 6 in Utrecht.

=== Music and events ===
The city has several music venues, such as TivoliVredenburg, Tivoli De Helling, ACU, Moira, EKKO, dB's and RASA. Utrecht hosts the yearly Utrecht Early Music Festival (Festival Oude Muziek). Several events in the Thunderdome series, a large gabber music event, have been held in Jaarbeurs Utrecht. The city also hosts Trance Energy there. Every summer there used to be the Summer Darkness festival, which celebrated goth culture and music. In November the Le Guess Who? festival, focused on indie rock, art rock and experimental rock, takes place in many of the city's venues.

=== Theatre ===
There are two main theatres in the city, the Theater Kikker and the Stadsschouwburg Utrecht. De Parade, a travelling theatre festival, performs in Utrecht in summer. The city also hosts the yearly Festival aan de Werf which offers a selection of contemporary international theatre, together with visual arts, public art and music. Another theatre, the Beatrix Theater, located in the Beurskwartier, has hosted musical productions including Mamma Mia! (2018-19).

== Notable people from Utrecht ==
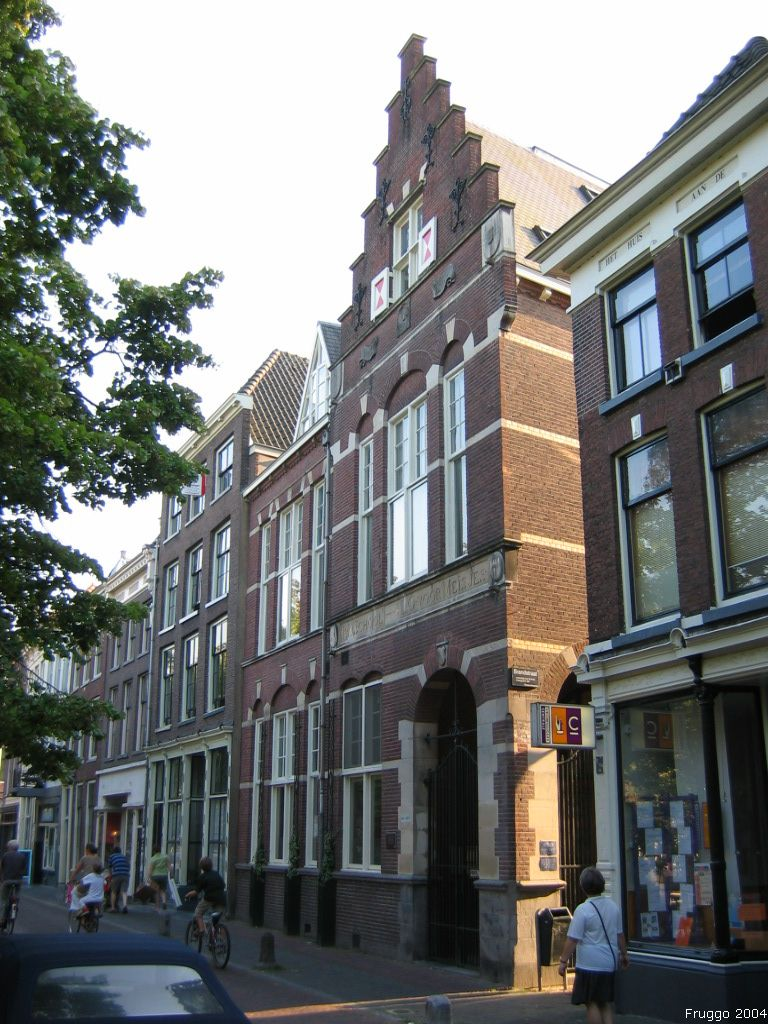
Birthplace of Pope Adrian VI

See also the category People from Utrecht

Over the ages famous people have been born or raised in Utrecht. Among the most famous Utrechters are:

- Louis Andriessen (1939–2021), composer
- Marco van Basten (born 1964), football player
- Dick Bruna (1927–2017), writer and illustrator (Miffy)
- C.H.D. Buys Ballot (1817–1890), meteorologist (Buys-Ballot's law)
- Karel Doorman (1889–1942), rear admiral (Battle of the Java Sea)
- Paul Fentener van Vlissingen (1941–2006), businessman and philanthropist
- Anton Geesink (1934–2010), judoka, first non-Japanese world champion in Judo
- Rijk de Gooyer (1925–2011), actor, writer, comedian and singer
- Arie Jan Haagen-Smit, Dutch chemist known as the "father of air pollution control," first recipient of the Tyler Prize for Environmental Achievement
- Sylvia Kristel (1952–2012), actress (Emmanuelle)
- Gerrit Rietveld (1888–1964), designer and architect (De Stijl movement)
- Dafne Schippers (born 1992), sprinter/heptathlon Olympian
- Theo van Doesburg (1883–1931), painter and artist (De Stijl movement)
- Herman van Veen (born 1945), actor, musician, singer-songwriter and author of Alfred J. Kwak
- Wil Velders-Vlasblom (1930–2019), first female alderman in Utrecht
- Jason Wilnis (born 1990), mixed martial artist and former kickboxing Glory middleweight champion
- Jurriën Timber (born 2001), football player for Premier League side Arsenal, with 25 international caps for the Dutch national team

== International relations ==
=== Twin towns ===
Utrecht is twinned with:

- León, Nicaragua
- Brno, Czech Republic
- Pekanbaru, Indonesia
- previously Hannover, Germany, between 1970 and 1976

=== Other relations ===
- Portland, Oregon, United States as a friendship city

== See also ==
- Catharijne – Former municipality of the Netherlands
- Lauwerecht – Municipality in Utrecht, the Netherlands
- List of mayors of Utrecht
- List of tallest buildings in Utrecht
- Utrecht (agglomeration)
