= Lunetten =

Coordinates: 52°03′44″N 5°08′03″E

Utrecht Lunetten
- Borough of Utrecht
- Country: Netherlands
- Province: Utrecht (province)
- Municipality: Utrecht

Population (2015)
  - Total: 11,620
- Postal code: 3524
- Website: http://www.lunetten.nl

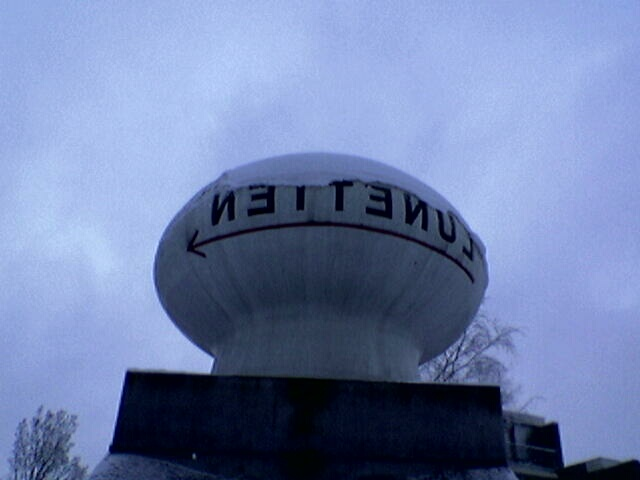
The Temple of Boom (1999) by Rob Birza

Lunetten is a neighbourhood in the southeastern part of the city of Utrecht, which has approximately 12,000 inhabitants. It is mainly a residential area, since there is no significant industry present.

Lunetten has a network of alleyways connecting the inner courtyards of the urban blocks. These create a child-friendly neighbourhood with many playing spots. There are also many sports facilities within and around Lunetten.

Lunetten is surrounded by major railroads and highways. To cope with the noise and pollution a park was created to surround and insulate the neighbourhood.

== History ==
Lunetten was constructed as an urban experiment mostly during the late 1970s and 1980s. It was designed and planned by a combination of students of architecture and urban planning and the then foreseen future inhabitants. A result of this was the use of a ring-road with many circular bifurcations running back onto themselves or with dead ends. In Dutch this is called a Bloemkoolwijk ("Cauliflower-neighbourhood"). This urban setup results in the whole neighbourhood becoming like a single living street, much like a distinct village within a city.

Lunetten has the longest (140 meters) lightweight bridge in the world with a weight of 400 tonnes (the Viaduct Nieuwe Houtenseweg). This was constructed on the A27 over the weekend of 3 and 4 March 2012.
