= Christian Union =

Christian Union may refer to:

- Christian Union (Lithuania), a Lithuanian Christian democratic political party (Krikščionių sąjunga in Lithuanian)
- Christian Union (Netherlands), a Dutch Christian democratic political party (ChristenUnie in Dutch)
- Christian Union (Slovakia), a Slovak Christian democratic political party (Kresťanská únia in Slovak)
- Christian Union (denomination), an evangelical Christian denomination in the mid-western U.S.
- Christian Union, a defunct American magazine published in New York from 1870 to 1893 before being renamed The Outlook
- Christian unions (student groups), Christian student group at universities or colleges

== See also ==
- Churches of Christ in Christian Union, an evangelical Christian denomination in the U.S.
