= Timeline of Utrecht =

Timeline of the history of the municipality of Utrecht, Netherlands

The following is a timeline of the history of the municipality of Utrecht, Netherlands.

== Prior to 18th century ==
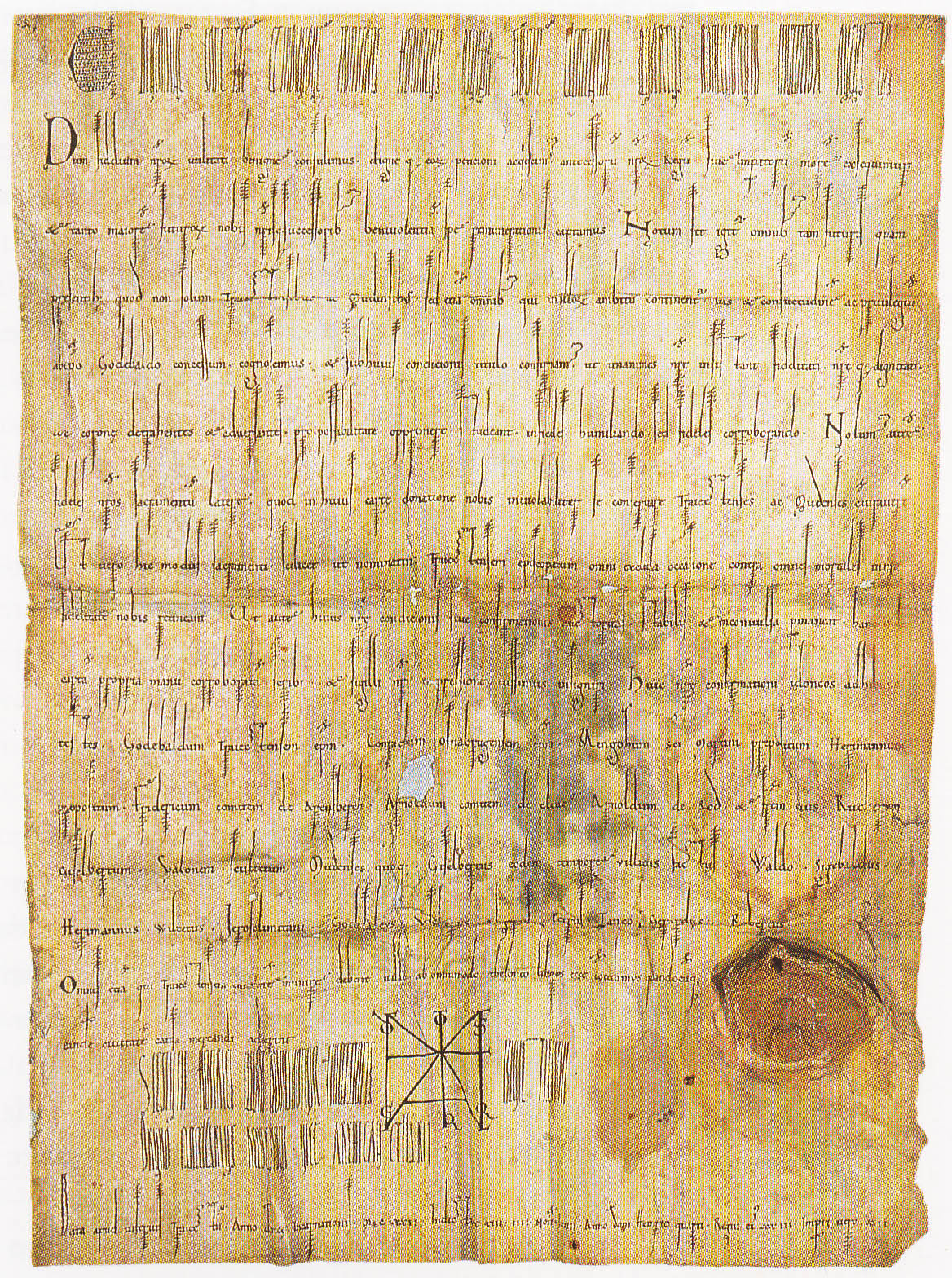
Document confirming Utrecht town privileges, 1122

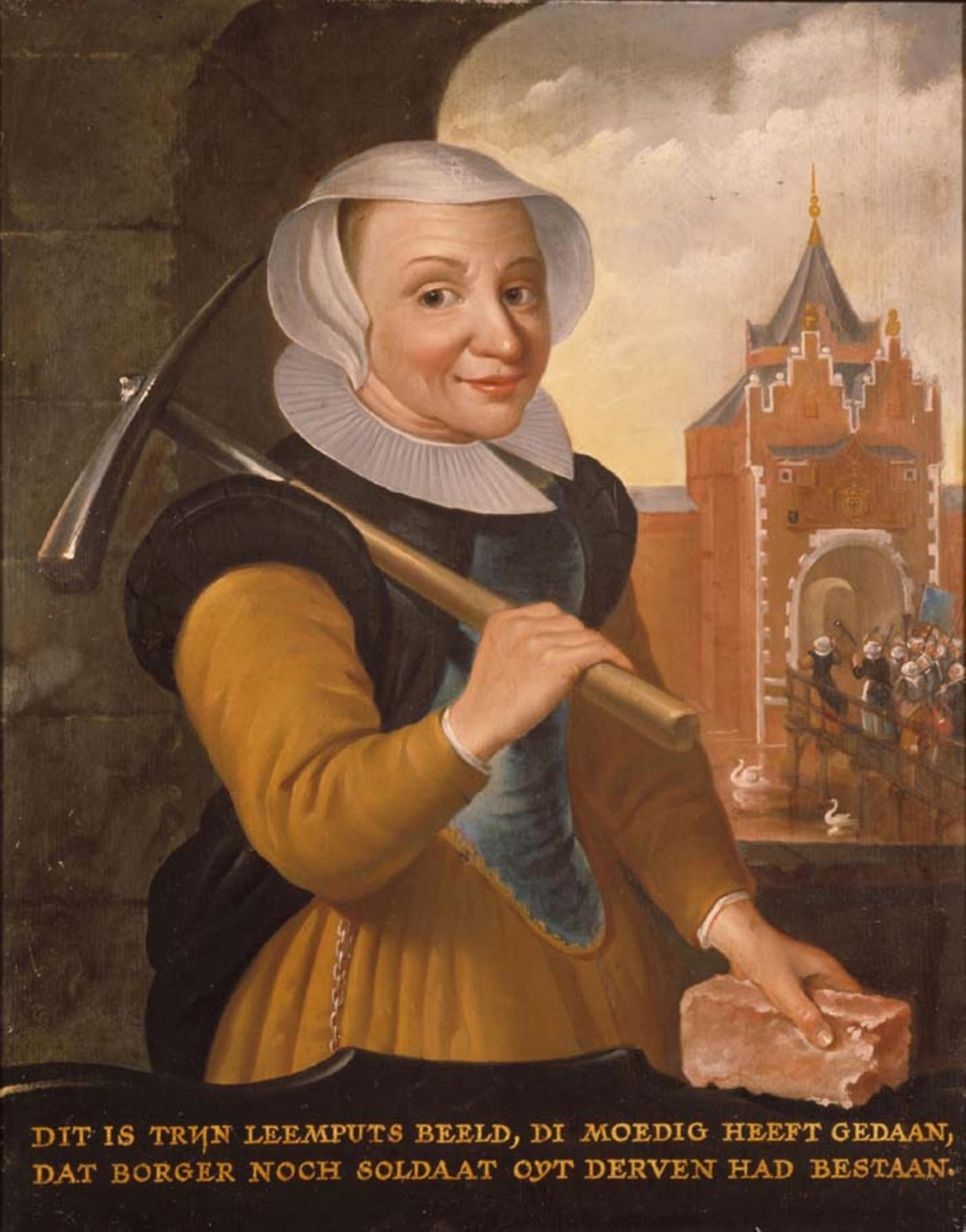
According to tradition Trijn van Leemput initiated demolition of Vredenburg castle in 1577

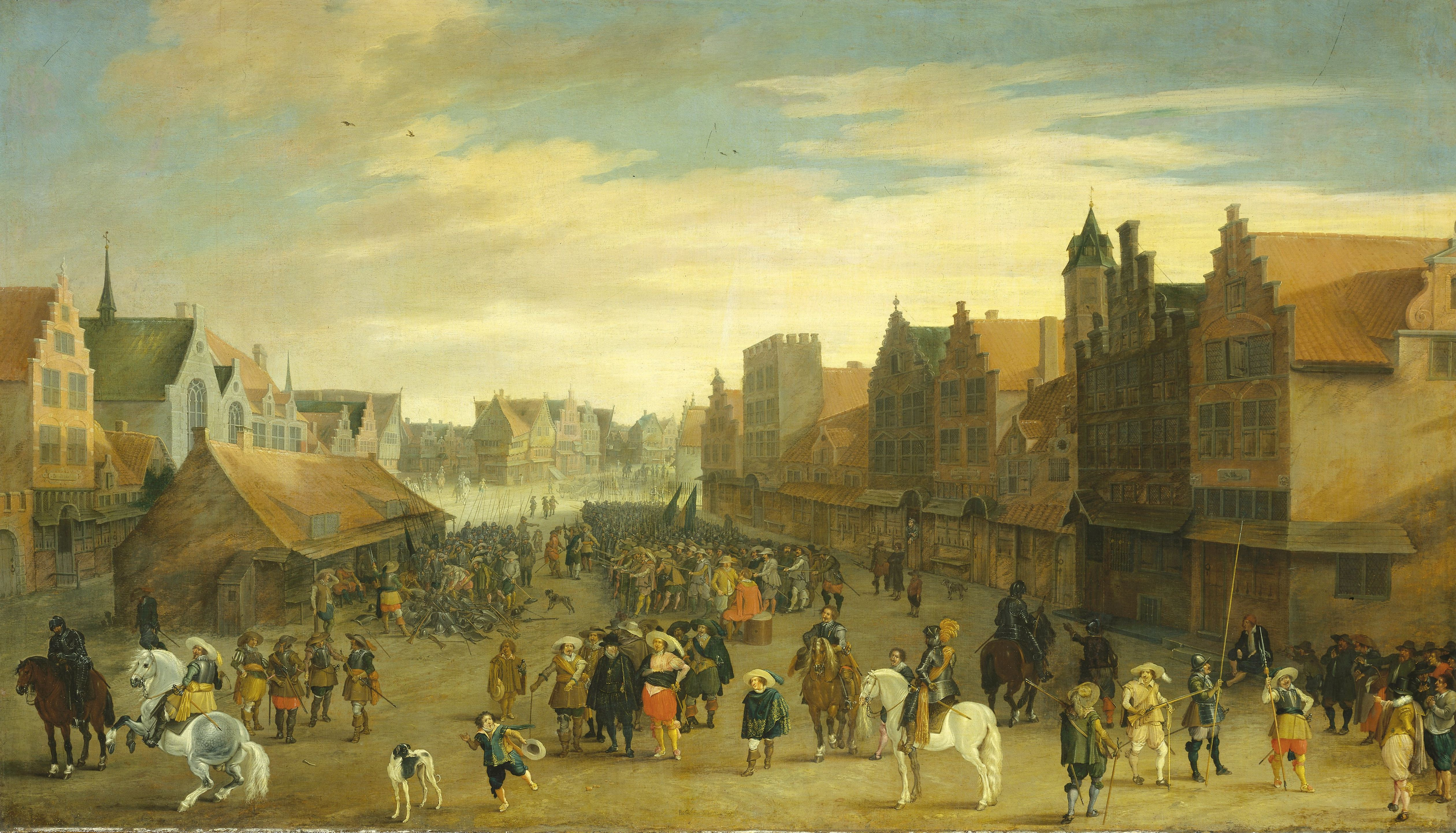
Maurice, Prince of Orange disbands the waardgelders (municipal mercenary army) on the Neude (town square) in Utrecht on 31 July 1618, by Paulus van Hillegaert (I)

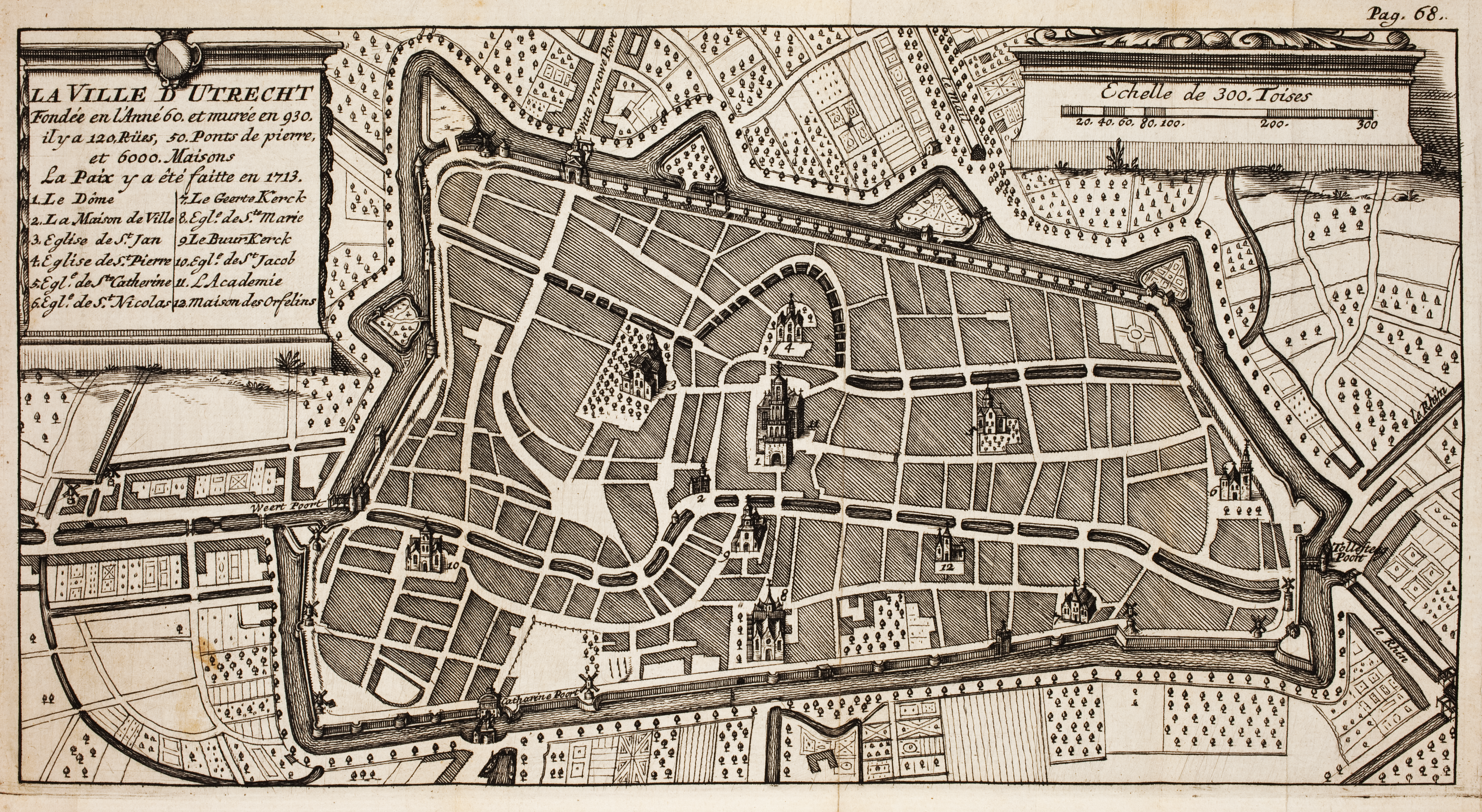
Map of Utrecht, around 1714.

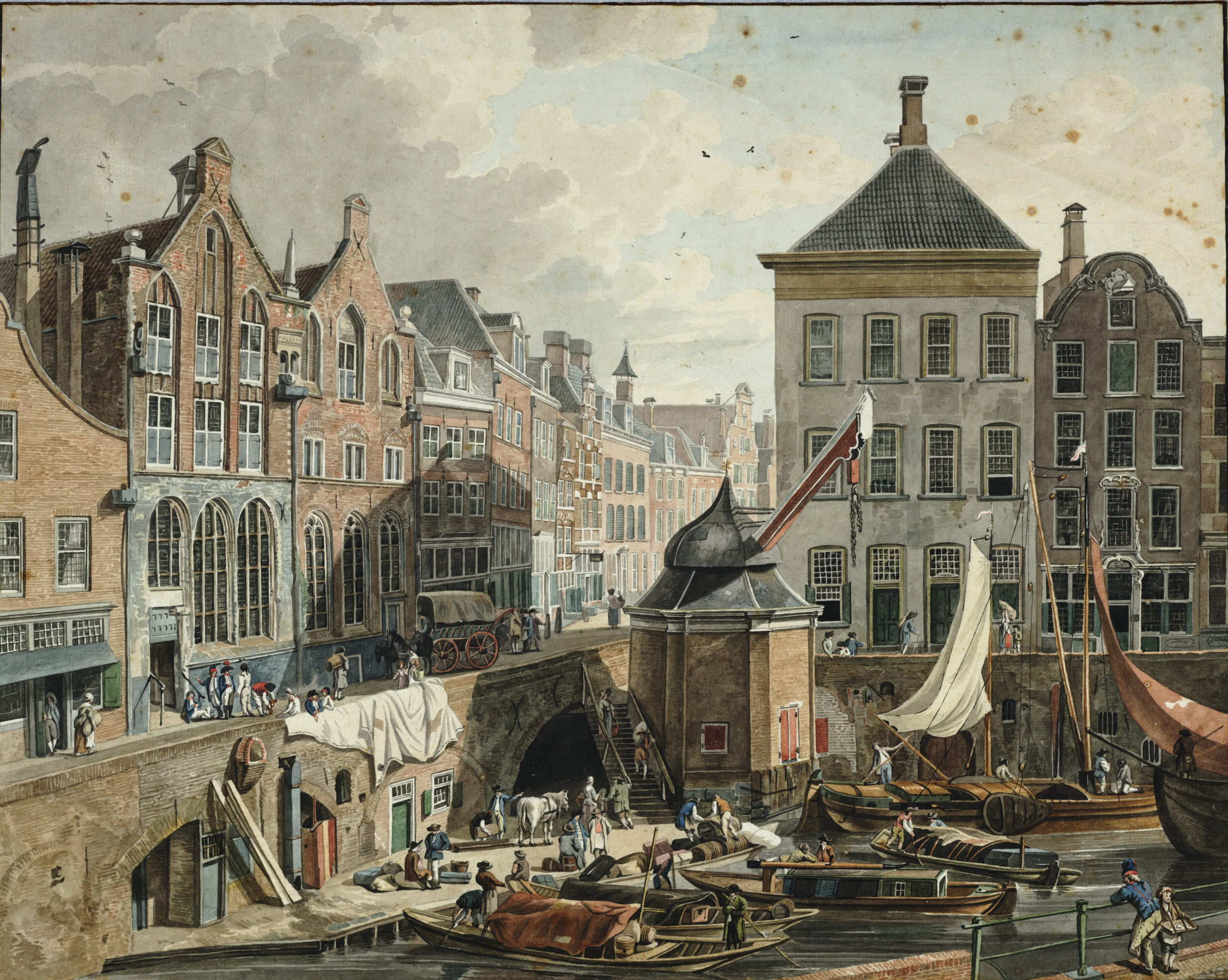
Utrecht's Oudegracht in 1800

- ~50 AD - Roman fortress built on what is now the Dom square as part of the Limes Germanicus. Named Traiectum to signify it was at a crossing of what was at that time the main branch of the Rhine (now the Oude Gracht)
- ~200 AD - Wooden fortress walls upgraded to imported tuff stone. Parts of these wall survive to date
- ~270 AD - Limes Germanicus including the fortress at Trajectum abandoned due to continued invasions.
- 636 - Chapel built by Dagobert I within the walls of the abandoned Roman fortress.
- 695 - Catholic diocese of Utrecht established.
- 720 - St. Martin's church founded by Willibrord (approximate date).
- 918 - Balderic becomes bishop.
- 1122
  - 22 June: Town privileges confirmed by Henry V, Holy Roman Emperor.
  - Oudegracht (canal) construction begins.
- 1145 - Smeetoren (tower) built (approximate date).
- 1267 - St. Martin's Cathedral built.
- 1279 - Buurkerk (church) rebuilding begins.
- 1370 - Public clock installed (approximate date).
- 1382 - St. Martin's Cathedral tower built.
- 1393 - Nieuwegracht (Utrecht) (moat) constructed.
- 1432 - Kleine Vleeshal built.
- 1440
  - Guildhall St. Eloy's Hospice in use.
  - Illuminated manuscript Hours of Catherine of Cleves created in Utrecht (approximate date).
- 1455 - 7 April: Gijsbrecht van Brederode becomes bishop elect of Utrecht after being elected by the chapters.
- 1455 - 13 September: David of Burgundy becomes bishop of Utrecht by papal appointment.
- 1459 - 2 March: Adriaan Florensz born, later Pope Adrian VI.
- 1470-4 - First Utrecht Civil War to quell continued opposition to his rule David of Burgundy imprisons Gijsbrecht van Brederode leading to the first Utrecht civil war.
- 1471 - Printing press in operation (approximate date).
- 1481-3 - Second Utrecht Civil War, David of Burgundy temporarily removed from power, but restored after the Siege of Utrecht (1483)
- 1517 - Paushuize (residence) built for Adrian VI.
- 1528 - Lordship of Utrecht established.
- 1532 - Vredenburg (castle) built.
- 1550 - St. Catherine Cathedral built (approximate date).
- 1577 - Demolition of Vredenburg castle begins.
- 1579 - 23 January: Treaty unifying northern provinces of the Netherlands signed in Utrecht.
- 1584 - Catholic property secularized.
- 1586 - Calvinists in power.
- 1620s - Utrecht Caravaggisti artists active.
- 1636 - Utrecht University and its library established.
- 1637 - Grote Vleeshuis built.
- 1644 - Schilders-Collegie founded.
- 1672-3 - Occupation by French forces.
- 1674 - 1 August: 1674 Netherlands storm. Major damage to several landmark building, most notably the collapse of the nave of the Dom church.

== 18th-19th centuries ==
- 1713 - International peace treaty relating to the War of the Spanish Succession signed in Utrecht.
- 1773 - Provincial Utrecht Society of Arts and Sciences founded.
- 1787 - 9 May: Prussians in power.
- 1795 - 18 January: Utrecht "acquired by the French."
- 1807 - Genootschap Kunstliefde (art society) formed.
- 1808 - Jewish cemetery, Utrecht established.
- 1813 - Jan van den Velden becomes mayor.
- 1816 - Utrechtsch Studenten Corps (student society) founded.
- 1823
  - Abstede, Catharijne, Lauwerecht, and Tolsteeg become part of city.
  - Oorsprongpark (Utrecht) opens.
- 1830 - Utrecht City Hall built.
- 1838 - City Museum of Antiquities opens.
- 1843 - Utrecht Centraal railway station opens.
- 1853 - Sonnenborgh Observatory established.
- 1866 - Population: 58,607 in city; 172,487 in province.
- 1872 - Aartsbisschoppelijk Museum opens.
- 1873 - Museum Kunstliefde established.
- 1879 - Regional Utrecht State Archives established.
- 1884
  - Utrechtsch Museum van Kunstnijverheid (applied arts museum) opens.
  - Population: 74,364.
- 1892 - Public library established.
- 1893 - Utrechts Nieuwsblad (newspaper) begins publication.
- 1894 - Utrecht City Orchestra founded.
- 1898 - Wilhelminapark (Utrecht) opens.

== 20th century ==
- 1902 - Aartsbisschoppelijk Paleis van Utrecht built.
- 1906 - Gemeentetram Utrecht (electric tram) begins operating.
- 1908 - Bioscoop Vreeburg (cinema) opens.
- 1913 - Rembrandt Bioscoop-Theater (cinema) opens.
- 1914 - Old Catholic St. Gertrude's Cathedral built.
- 1916 - Nationale Bankvereeniging (bank) established.
- 1919 - Population: 138,334.
- 1921 - Centraal Museum established.
- 1924 - Rietveld Schröder House built in the De Stijl design mode.
- 1927 - Louis Hartlooper Complex construction begins (approximate date).
- 1940 - Population: 165,029.
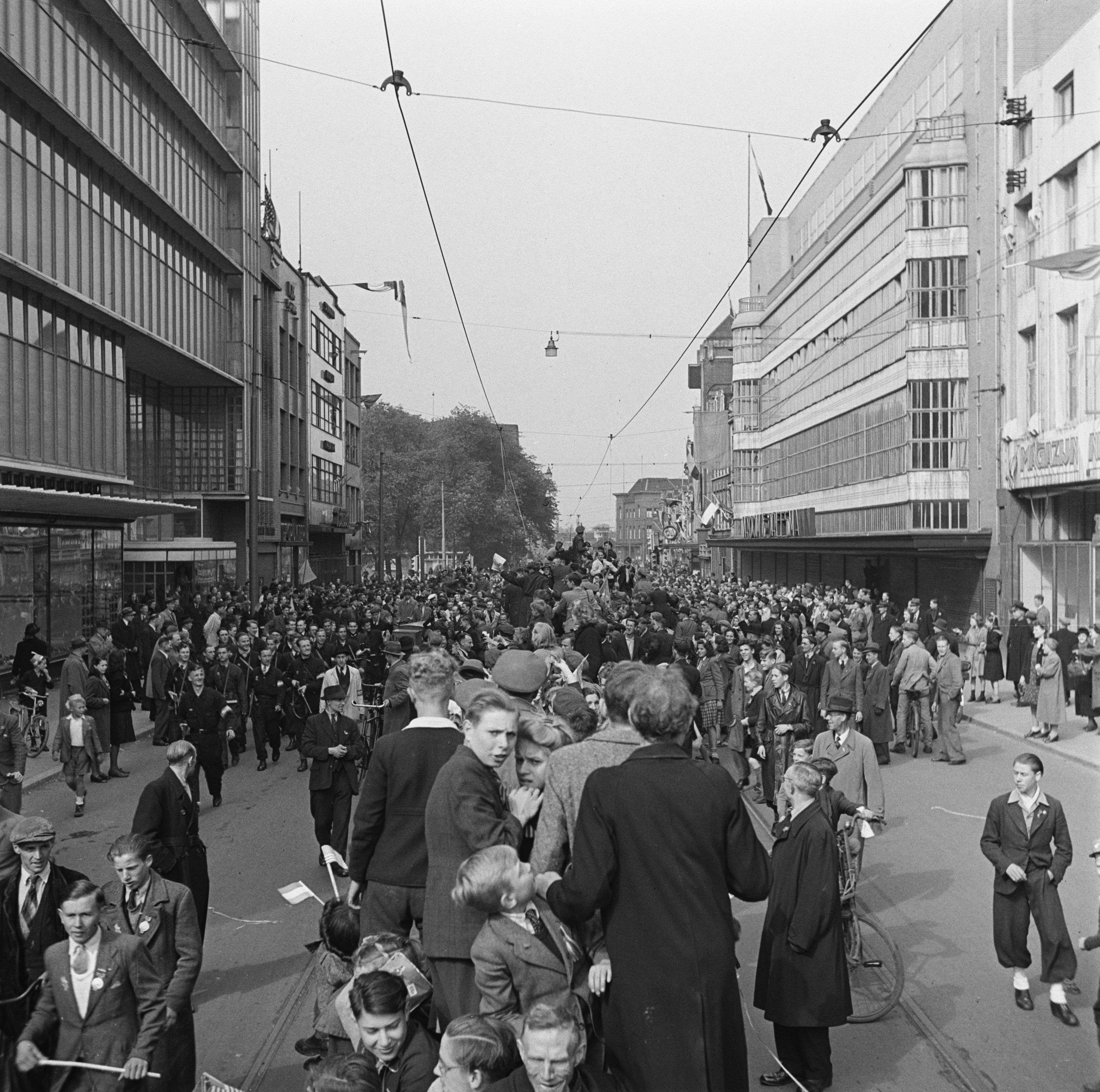
  Utrecht on 7 May 1945
- 1950 - Population: 193,190.
- 1954 - Oudenrijn (section) and Zuilen become part of city.
- 1960 - Population: 254,186.
- 1961 - Neudeflat built.
- 1967 - 12 June: 1967 Utrecht explosion in Lage Weide.
- 1968 - Sarasani cannabis coffee shop in business.
- 1970 - Football Club Utrecht formed.
- 1970s - part of moat converted to motorway.
- 1976 - Westraven hi-rise built.
- 1978 - Springhaver cinema opens.
- 1979 - Muziekcentrum Vredenburg (concert hall) and Museum Catharijneconvent open.
- 1980 - Population: 237,037 municipality.
- 1983 - Utrechtse sneltram opens.
- 1985 - May: Catholic pope visits Utrecht.
- 1987 - Leefbaarheidsbudget (participatory budgeting) introduced.
- 1998 - City Utrecht Archive established.
- 2000 - Population: 233,667.

== 21st century ==
- 2001 - Vleuten-De Meern becomes part of city.
- 2002 - Regio Randstad regional governance group formed.
- 2006 - Dick Bruna House museum opens.
- 2008 - Galghenwert hi-rise built.
- 2011 - Rabobank Bestuurscentrum hi-rise built.
- 2012 - Utrecht befriends the city of Portland, Oregon, USA.
- 2013 - Population: 321,916 municipality.
- 2014
  - TivoliVredenburg concert hall opens.
  - Jan van Zanen becomes mayor.
- 2015 - July: 2015 Tour de France cycling race starts from Utrecht.
- 2017
  - May: Basic income pilot to begin.
  - August: Bicycle parking garage opens.
- 2019 - March: 2019 Utrecht shooting
- 2020 - September: re-conversion of motorway back to moat/canal completed.

== See also ==
- Utrecht history
- History of Utrecht
- List of mayors of Utrecht
- List of bishops of Utrecht
- List of rijksmonuments in Utrecht (city)
- List of tallest buildings in Utrecht (city)
- History of Utrecht province
- Timelines of other municipalities in the Netherlands: Amsterdam, Breda, Delft, Eindhoven, Groningen, Haarlem, The Hague, 's-Hertogenbosch, Leiden, Maastricht, Nijmegen, Rotterdam

== Bibliography ==
=== Published in the 18th–19th centuries ===
In English

- Thomas Nugent (1749), "Utrecht", The Grand Tour, vol. 1: Netherlands, London: S. Birt, hdl:2027/mdp.39015030762598
- "Utrecht". A Geographical, Historical and Political Description of the Empire of Germany, Holland, the Netherlands, Switzerland, Prussia, Italy, Sicily, Corsica and Sardinia: With a Gazetteer. London: John Stockdale. 1800. OCLC 79519893.
- Abraham Rees (1819), "Utrecht", The Cyclopaedia, London: Longman, Hurst, Rees, Orme & Brown, hdl:2027/uc2.ark:/13960/t3vt1xd50
- "Utrecht". Galignani's Traveller's Guide through Holland and Belgium (4th ed.). Paris: A. and W. Galignani. 1822. hdl:2027/njp.32101073846667.
- "Utrecht", Handbook for Travellers in Holland and Belgium (20th ed.), London: John Murray, 1881, hdl:2027/hvd.hn2ha2 – via HathiTrust (+ 1851 ed.)
- W. Pembroke Fetridge (1885). "Utrecht". Harper's Hand-Book for Travellers in Europe and the East. New York: Harper & Brothers.

In other languages

- Abraham Jacob van der Aa (1848). "Utrecht". Aardrijkskundig woordenboek der Nederlanden [Geographical dictionary of the Netherlands] (in Dutch). Vol. 11. Gorinchem: Jacobus Noorduyn – via HathiTrust.
- Volledig adresboek der stad Utrecht ... 1863-1864 [Directory of the City of Utrecht] (in Dutch). J. Van Boekhoven. 1863.
- Samuel Muller Fz. [in Dutch] (1878). Catalogus van den topographischen atlas der provincie Utrecht (in Dutch). Beijers. (bibliography)
- H. T. Luks (1891). "Utrecht". Belgien und Holland. Griebens Reise-Bibliothek (in German) (5th ed.). Berlin: Albert Goldschmidt.

=== Published in the 20th century ===
In English

- "Utrecht". Chambers's Encyclopaedia. London. 1901. hdl:2027/uc2.ark:/13960/t56d64f6t.
- "Utrecht", Jewish Encyclopedia, vol. 12, New York, 1907, hdl:2027/osu.32435029752839
- Charles Bertram Black (1908), "Utrecht", Holland: its Rail, Tram, and Waterways (3rd ed.), London: A. and C. Black (+ 1876 ed.)
- Edmundson, George (1910). "Utrecht (city)" . Encyclopædia Britannica. Vol. 27 (11th ed.). pp. 824–826.
- George Wharton Edwards (1909). "Utrecht". Holland of To-day. New York: Moffat, Yard & Company.
- "Utrecht". Belgium and Holland (15th ed.). Leipzig: Karl Baedeker. 1910. OCLC 397759. (+ 1881 ed.)
- "Archdiocese of Utrecht", Catholic Encyclopedia, New York, 1913, hdl:2027/nyp.33433070780394
- Trudy Ring, ed. (1995). "Utrecht". Northern Europe. International Dictionary of Historic Places. Fitzroy Dearborn. p. 762+. ISBN 978-1-136-63944-9.

In Dutch

- Henri Zondervan, ed. (1922), "Utrecht", Winkler Prins' Geillustreerde Encyclopaedie (in Dutch), vol. 16 (4th ed.), Amsterdam: Uitgevers-Maatschappy "Elsevier", hdl:2027/mdp.39015068347908
- G. van Herwijnen, ed. (1978). "Utrecht". Bibliografie van de stedengeschiedenis van Nederland [Bibliography of Urban History in the Netherlands] (in Dutch). Brill. ISBN 90-04-05700-5.
