= Trijn van Leemput =

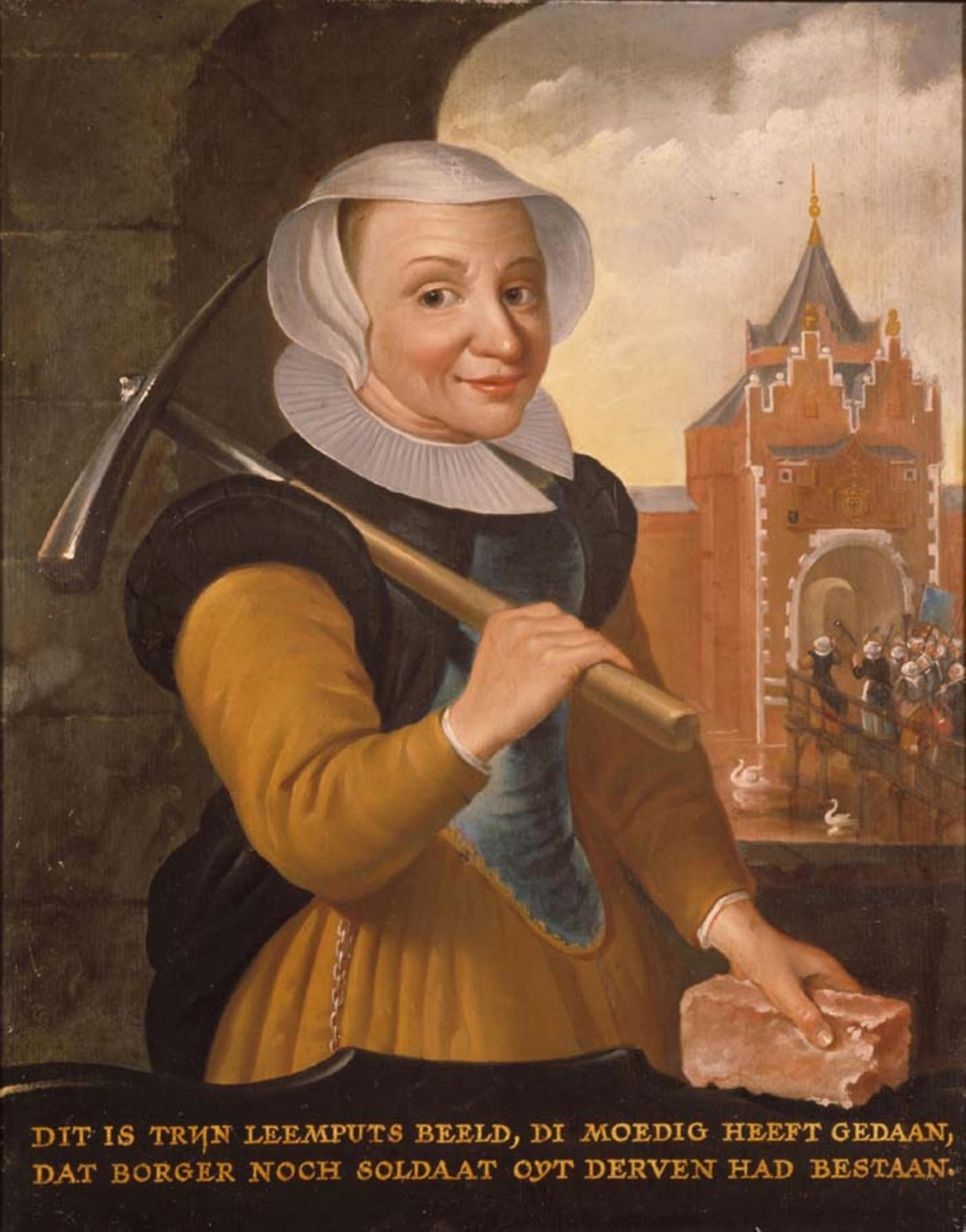
Painting of Trijn van Leemput. Anonymous, c. 1650

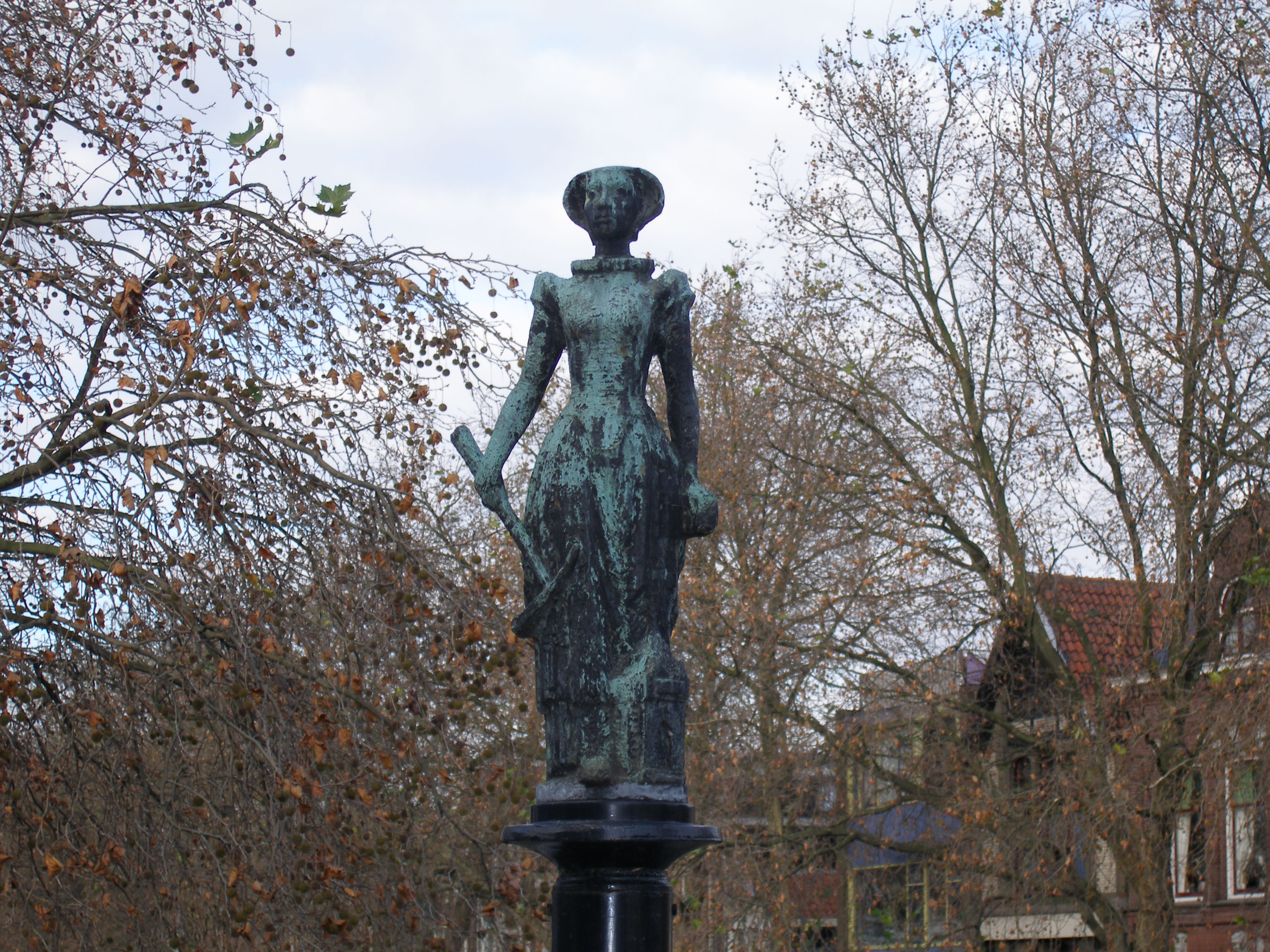
Statue of Trijn van Leemput in Utrecht

Trijn van Leemput (c. 1530–1607) was a Dutch heroine of the Eighty Years' War against Spain. According to local legend in Utrecht, she led a large group of women on May 2, 1577, to the castle of Vredenburg and gave the signal to begin demolishing the castle.

The castle of Vredenburg had been built by emperor Charles V after annexing Utrecht in 1528, and was manned by a Spanish garrison. On November 8, 1576, the Pacification of Ghent was signed and the Eighty Years' War began. The Dutch rebels besieged the Vredenburg fortress and, following negotiations, the garrison abandoned the castle in February 1577.

The citizens of Utrecht demanded that the abandoned castle be demolished, but the city government would not allow it, so on May 2 the Utrechters, led by Trijn van Leemput, took matters into their own hands. The events that followed were recorded by contemporaries Arnold Buchelius (1565–1641) and Johan van Beverwijck (1594–1647). Later historians have cast doubt on the historical accuracy of the tale. Most likely it is part legend and partly based on fact.

Trijn van Leemput is said to have gathered a large group of women and marched on the castle, carrying a makeshift banner made out of a blue apron tied to a broom. At the castle, she signalled for the demolition to begin by removing some bricks from the castle walls. The other Utrechters followed suit, and began breaking down the walls using axes, hammers and pick-axes.

She is also said to have fought two Spanish soldiers, who were lodged at her house, at an earlier occasion. After catching them stealing, she threw one down the stairs and threatened the other with a knife.

Archival research has shown that Trijn van Leemput really existed and was born around 1530, probably near Vreeswijk. She and her husband, brewer and miller Jan Jacob van Leemput, moved into a large house on the Oudegracht canal in Utrecht in 1555. The family was one of the city's most prominent families. Trijn's husband was a guild leader and member of the city government, and was one of the four deputies who negotiated with William the Silent on the conditions for Utrecht's entry into the Pacification of Ghent, the Dutch coalition against Spain. Trijn van Leemput died in Utrecht.

As early as the 17th century, Trijn van Leemput was depicted in various paintings. A statue of her, pick-axe in hand, was erected on Zandbrug bridge , near her home, in 1955.

== Sources ==
- Instituut voor Nederlandse geschiedenis (in Dutch)
- De Dom Digitaal (in Dutch)
