= Winkel van Sinkel =

Department store in Utrecht, Netherlands

Coordinates: 52.0920°N 5.1186°E

General information
- Type: Department store (former); restaurant and retail (current)
- Architectural style: Neoclassical
- Location: Utrecht, Netherlands, Oudegracht 158–160
- Opened: 1839

Design and construction
- Architect: Pieter Adams

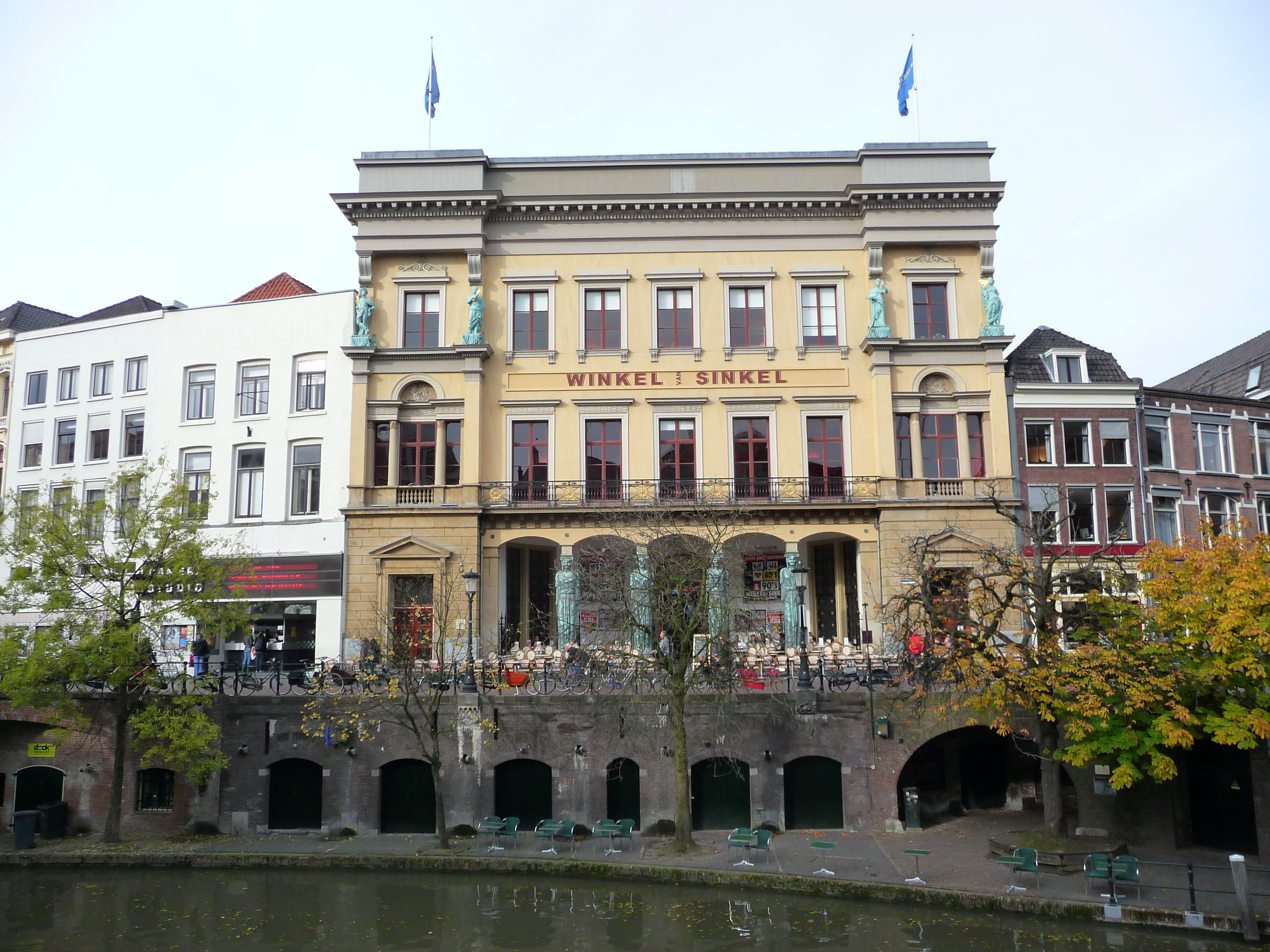
Winkel van Sinkel, Utrecht

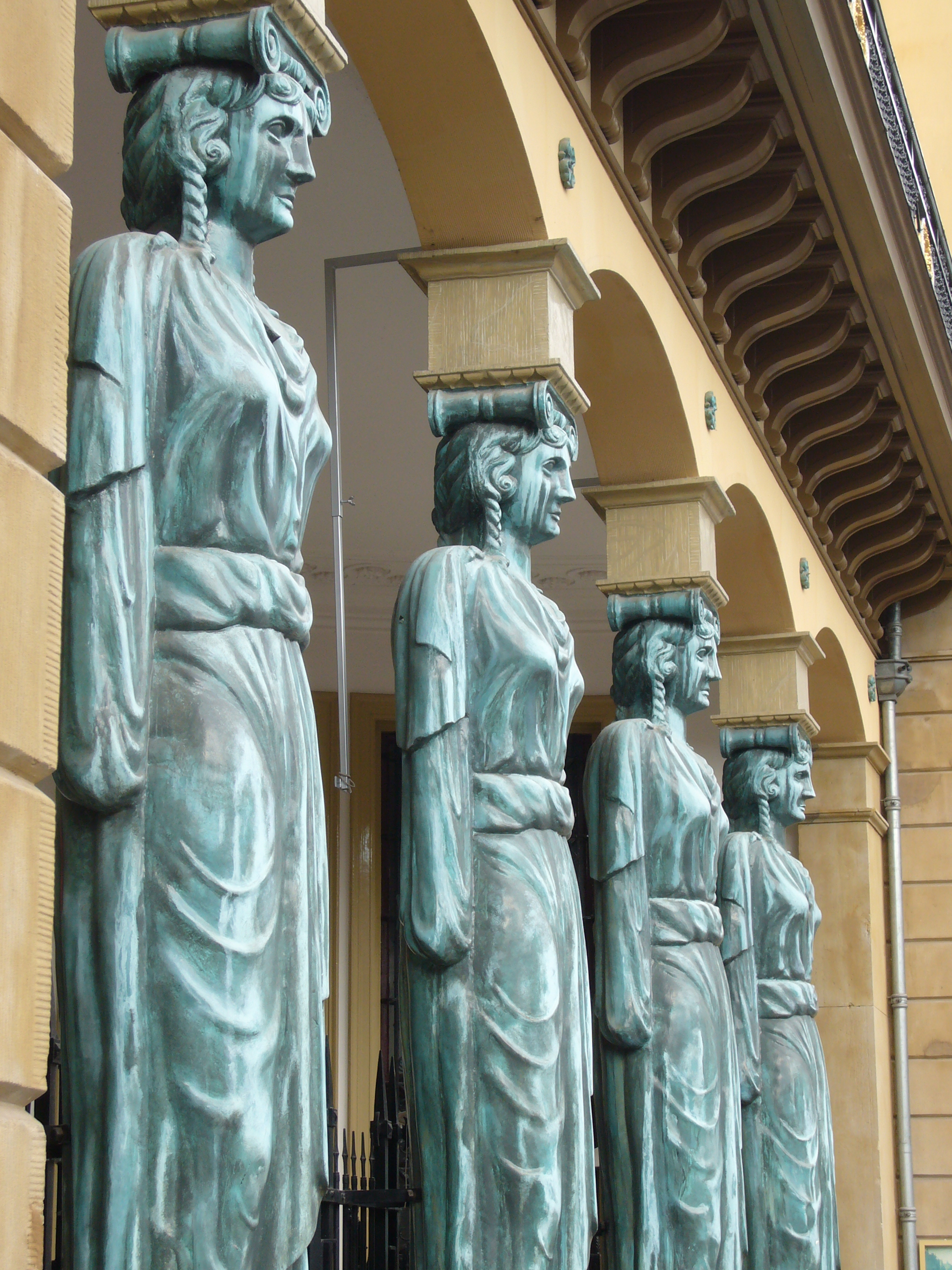
Sculptures of the Utrecht store

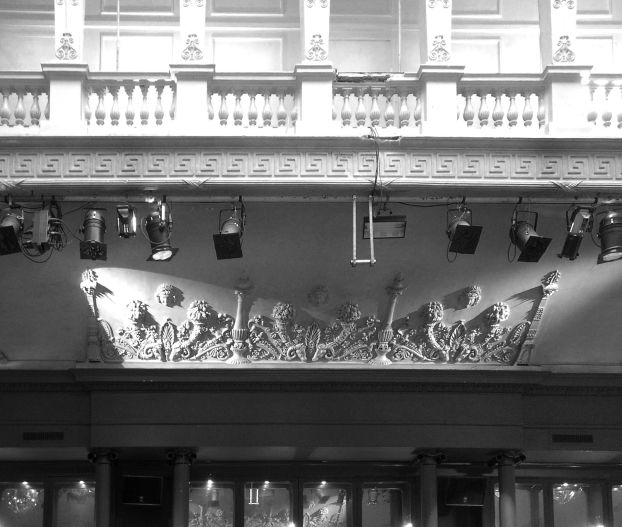
Decoration of the Utrecht store

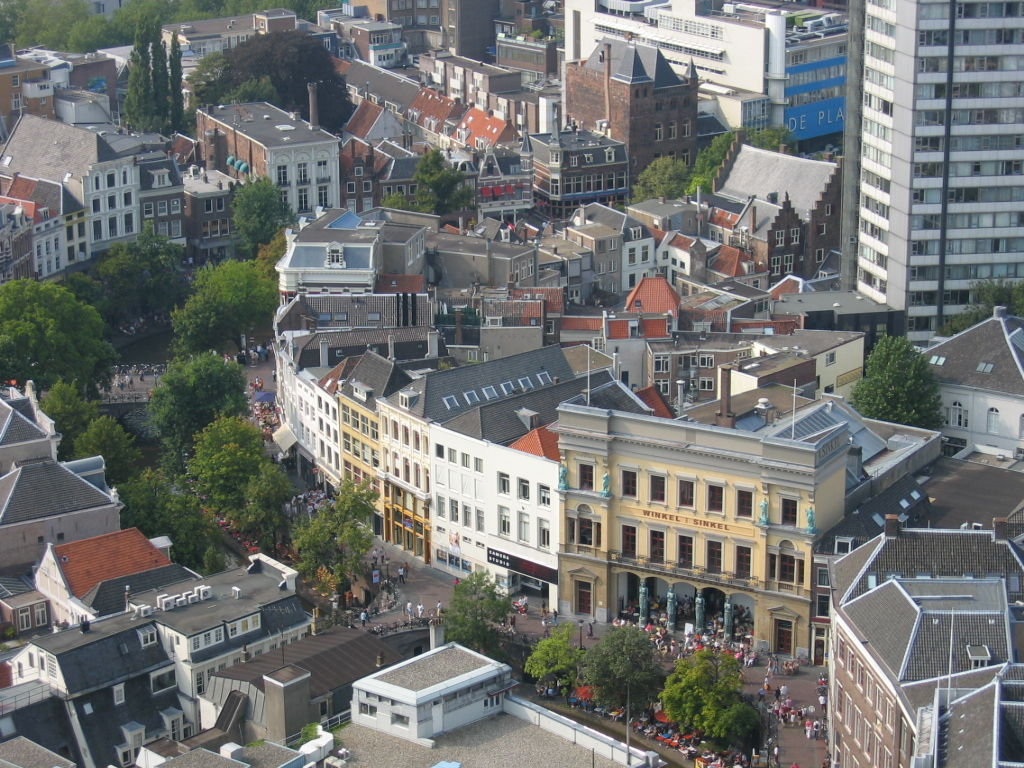
Utrecht store seen from the Dom

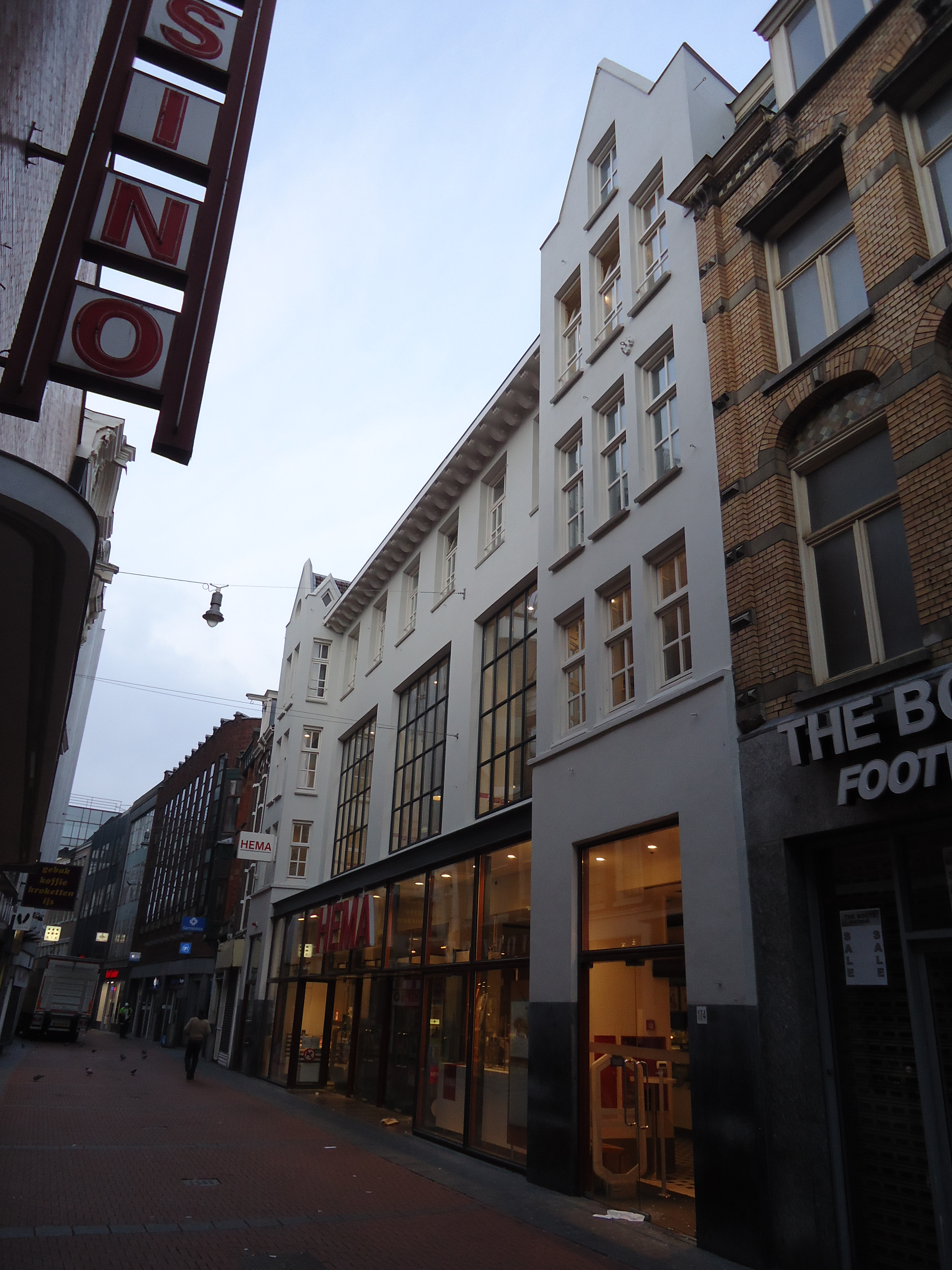
Store on Nieuwendijk in Amsterdam, now a HEMA

De Winkel van Sinkel was the first department store in The Netherlands, built between 1837 and 1839 and located at Oudegracht 158 in Utrecht. The Winkel van Sinkel Company started as a fabric store in Amsterdam, and after multiple expansions became a department store, but it was the branch in Utrecht with its expansive range of merchandise that truly established it as a concept in Dutch popular culture, "Winkel van Sinkel" having become a general term for shops where all kinds of different goods are for sale.

== Amsterdam ==
In the first half of the nineteenth century fabric traders such Clemens and August Brenninkmeyer (C&A), Cloppenburg (Peek and Cloppenburg) and Kreymborg came to the Netherlands from Oldenburg or Westphalia in what is now Germany, where they started as simple peddlers (marskramers in Dutch) and later established renowned companies.

On April 22, 1822, Anton Sinkel (b. 1785 in Cloppenburg, Germany), started a drapery shop on Nieuwendijk #174-176. Soon afterwards he bought the buildings across the street, #175-177. At #174 he established a large fabric store, at #176 a men's workshop, at #175 a home furnishings department for private individuals and at #177 a men's fitting room and a cloth shop. Sinkel soon expanded his business by purchasing a building in the Kalverstraat, as well as Damrak 63, where he opened a home furnishings business for companies and mansions. In 1826 he opened a branch on Nieuwestad in Leeuwarden, then on Grotemarkt in Rotterdam and after that on the Botermarkt in Leiden. The Leeuwarden branch closed in 1891.

== Utrecht ==
On May 1, 1824, Sinkel bought the house in Utrecht called The Wooden Leg, also known as Bledenstein, on the Oudegracht. He converted the building into a shop and engaged Albertus Maseland to manage it.

On March 15, 1834, he bought the buildings of the former Sint-Barbara and Sint-Laurensgasthuis and the two houses that stood between it and his shop (and some cellars) on the Oudegracht. The guesthouse building stretched from the Oudegracht to the Neude. He had also already bought 2 houses on the Neude. He planned to have a large department store built here after demolishing this building and adjacent buildings. When construction was delayed, people complained about the hole on the Oudegracht. The municipal council urged Sinkel to urgently or otherwise fence off the site with a wall on both the canal side and the Neude. The Oudegracht store in Utrecht opened on May 6, 1839.

The designer of the new building on the Oudegracht and the coach house on Vinkenburgstraat was the Rotterdam city architect Pieter Adams. For the Winkel van Sinkel building in Utrecht, Sinkel probably got the idea in England to decorate the façade with columns in the shape of caryatids (female statues). These four heavy, cast-iron statues were cast in England and were derisively called "the British whores". When construction finally started, this façade attracted a lot of attention. Something went wrong during the delivery of the statues, which happened by barge. While lifting one of the statues on September 9, 1837, the top part of the city crane at the wharf broke off and fell into the water, statue and all. The city crane was so damaged that it was decided to demolish it. To this day, the site in front of the Winkel van Sinkel still indicates where this crane once stood. As was customary at the time, a mocking verse was made of this event to help tell the story:

"Had reeds het Instrument van ouds genaamd de kraan
Ten dienste dezer stad twee eeuwen lang bestaan"
The instrument called "the crane" since days of yore
Had already stood for two centuries in service of the city
"Maar moest, schoon sterk genoeg om half Schiedam te ligten
Voor een gegoten beeld in deze dagen zwichten"
But – strong enough to lift half of Schiedam – Had to succumb to a cast statue
"O, kinderen van de kraan, wat werk hebt gij begonnen
Zie nu, een Britsche hoer, heeft kraantje overwonnen"
Oh children of the Crane, what work have you begun? Behold, a British whore, conquered little Crane.

The story does not tell how the statue eventually emerged from the water. In addition to the four caryatids, four cast-iron figures have been placed on the facade as symbols of commerce, prudence, seafaring and hope.

The Winkel van Sinkel Utrecht was opened on May 6, 1839. Although it was primarily a factory store without self-service, the store is seen as the first department store in the Netherlands as there was a lot of diverse types of merchandise for sale. Sinkel then came up with the well-known verse as an advertisement:

"In de Winkel van Sinkel"
In the Sinkel Shop
"Is alles te koop."
Everything is for sale.
"Daar kan men krijgen:"
There one can get:
"Mandjes met vijgen,"
Baskets of figs,
"Doosjes pommade,
Boxes of pomade,
"Flesjes orgeade,"
Bottles of orgeade,
"Hoeden en petten"
Hats and caps
"En damescorsetten"
And women's corsets
"Drop om te snoepen"
Licorice to snack on
"En pillen om te poepen"
And pills for pooping

== Rotterdam ==
There was an A. Sinkel department store on the Grote Markt in Rotterdam. It was the first department store in Rotterdam. Little else is known about this location. The entire area was destroyed during the bombing in 1940.

== Legacy ==
After Sinkel's death in Amsterdam on January 22, 1848, an employee, Anton Povel, took over the business. The Sinkel company ceased to exist in 1912, after the building Vlaer and Kol (later a part of Amrobank) bought the building in 1898.

Today the Utrecht building is known as "Horecawarenhuis Winkel van Sinkel " (roughly translating to "Winkel van Sinkel Restaurant & Bar Department Store"), and contains a grand café (restaurant), bar, wine bar and event space.

The Amsterdam Winkel van Sinkel on Nieuwendijk is now a branch of discount store HEMA.

The name Winkel van Sinkel can still be found in various places in the Netherlands. In Hoogkarspel, for example, it is the name of a do-it-yourself store.
