= Catharijne =

Former municipality of the Netherlands

Coordinates: 52°5′23″N 5°6′42″E

Catharijne is a former municipality on the west side of the Dutch city of Utrecht. It was a separate municipality between 1818 and 1823, when it merged with the city of Utrecht.

It was named for the St. Catharina monastery in Utrecht, which was demolished in 1528 to make way for the castle Vredenburg. One of the city gates was named after this monastery; the municipality of Catharijne was on the outside of this gate.
