= Abstede =

Coordinates: 52°5′0″N 5°7′50″E

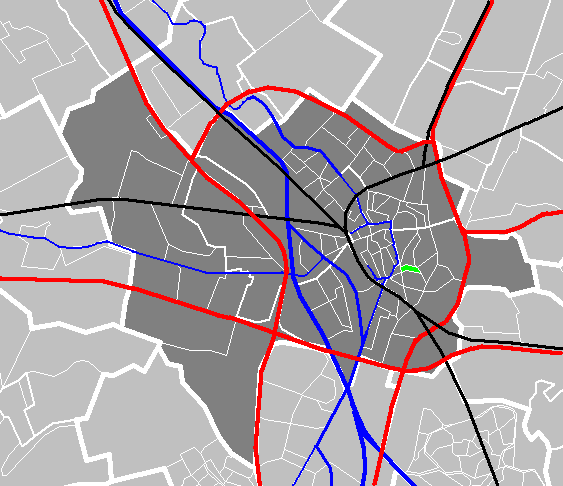
Neighbourhood Abstede (green) in the municipality of Utrecht (dark grey).

Abstede is a neighbourhood of the Dutch city of Utrecht.

== History ==
According to the 19th-century historian A.J. van der Aa, Abstede (formerly also called Abtstede or Abstade) derives its name from an abbey of Cistercian nuns. The abbey was closed in 1227, when the nuns were moved against their will by Wilbrand van Oldenburg, bishop of Utrecht, to the St. Servaas Monastery, in the city, that he himself founded.

Until the end of the eighteenth century, Abstede was a separate jurisdiction, like a village. Between 1818 and 1823, Abstede was a separate municipality again. It was annexed by the city of Utrecht in 1823.
