= Oudegracht =

Canal in Utrecht, Netherlands

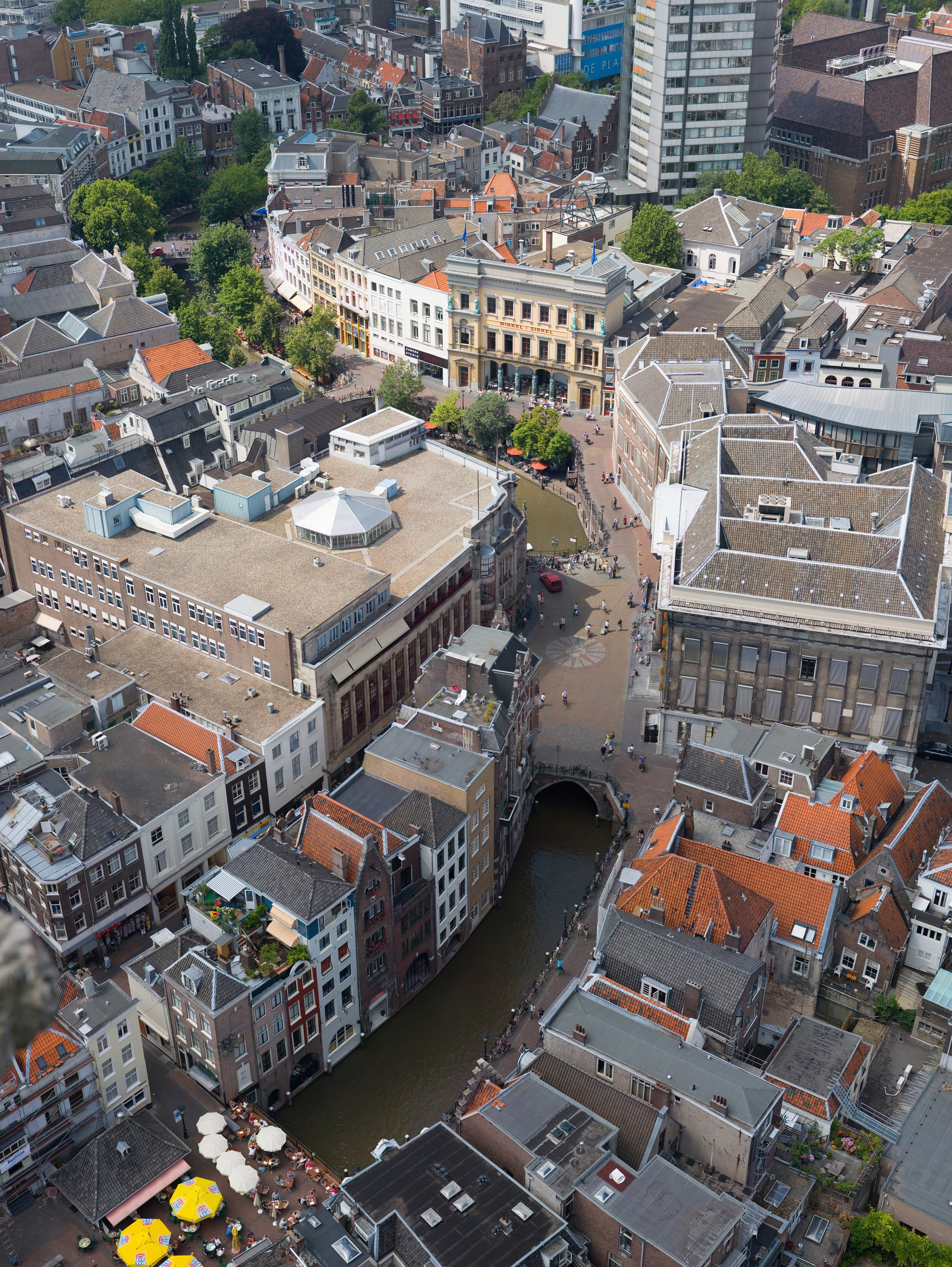
- The canal in Utrecht center, seen from the Dom Tower
- Interactive map of Oudegracht
- Country: Netherlands

Specifications
- Length: 2 km (1.2 miles)

Geography
- Direction: Northwest
- Start point: Southern Utrecht
- End point: Northern Utrecht
- Beginning coordinates: 52.082°N 5.123°E
- Ending coordinates: 52.097°N 5.115°E

The Oudegracht, or "old canal", runs through the center of Utrecht, the Netherlands. It starts in the southeast of the city. Here the Kromme Rijn (the original main bed of the Rhine river) and the Vaartse Rijn (a medieval canal reconnecting Utrecht to the newer main stream of the Rhine, the Lek) arrive to meet the original moat of the fortified town, and the Oudegracht goes from there into the center of town. Parts of the Oudegracht follow the original flow of the river Rhine, but there is some disagreement on what parts. The northern part is most likely an early canal (app. AD 1000) connecting the Rhine section to the river Vecht. The southern part was started in 1122, after the water level of the Rhine in Utrecht dropped because of the new dam at Wijk bij Duurstede. The ground excavated was used to raise the sides of the canal, to reduce the chance of flooding. When the city's system of locks was finished in 1275 the water level was constant, enabling the creation of permanently dry cellars and new quays at water level, hence the typical wharfs (Dutch: werven) below street level. Warehouses used to line the canal. Today many of these warehouses have been converted into restaurants and cafés.

== Gallery ==
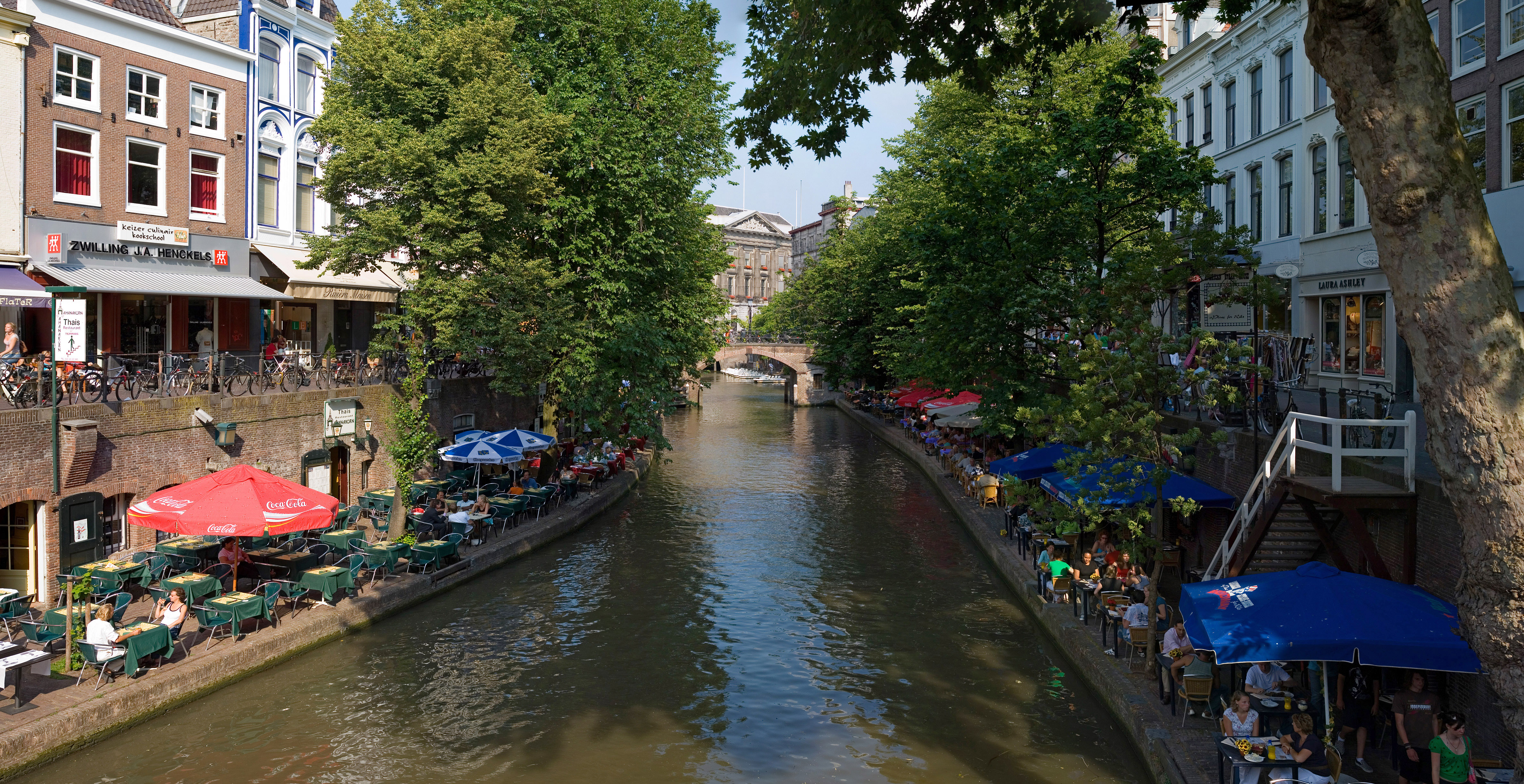
Wharfs along the Oudegracht

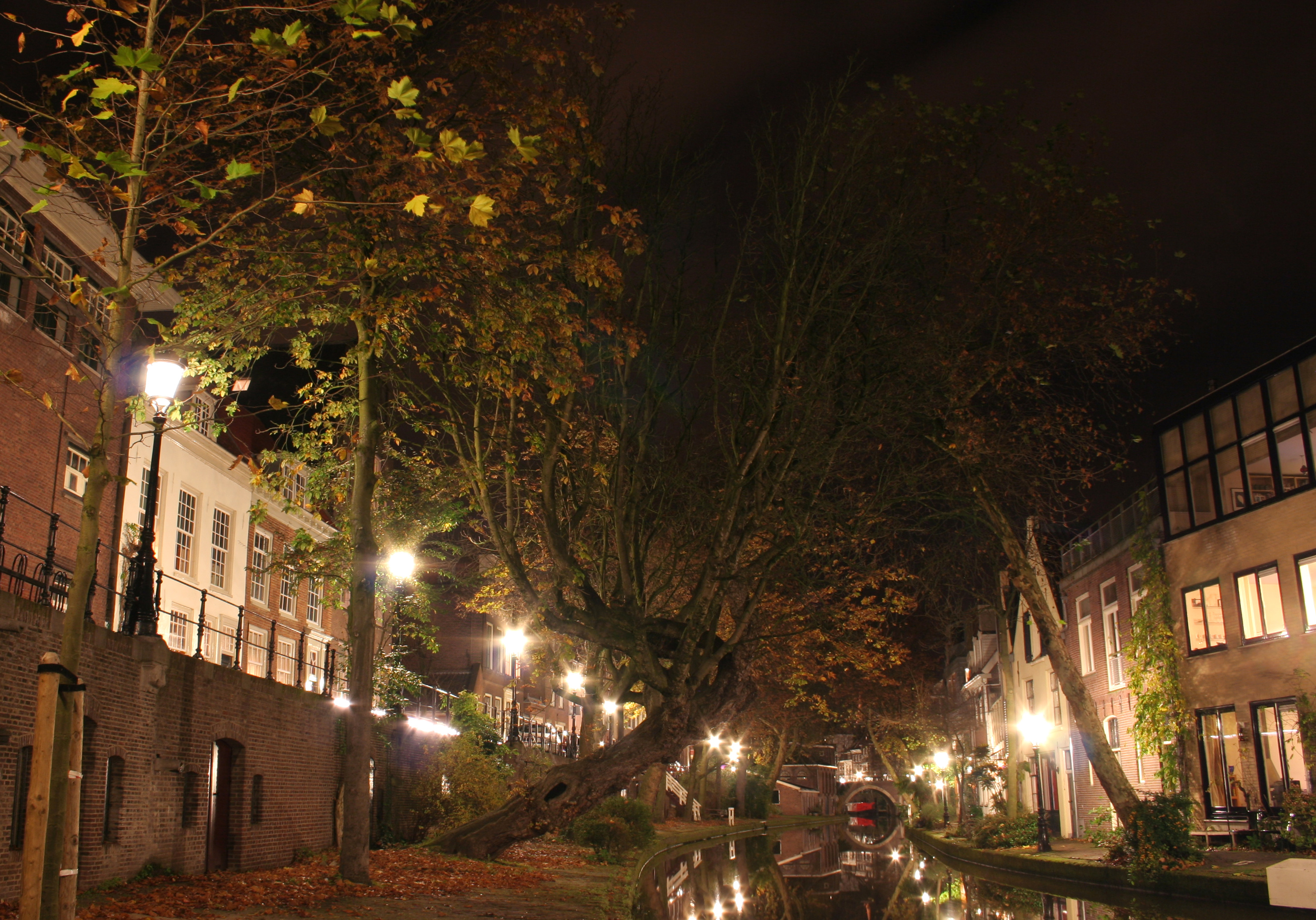
Oudegracht by night

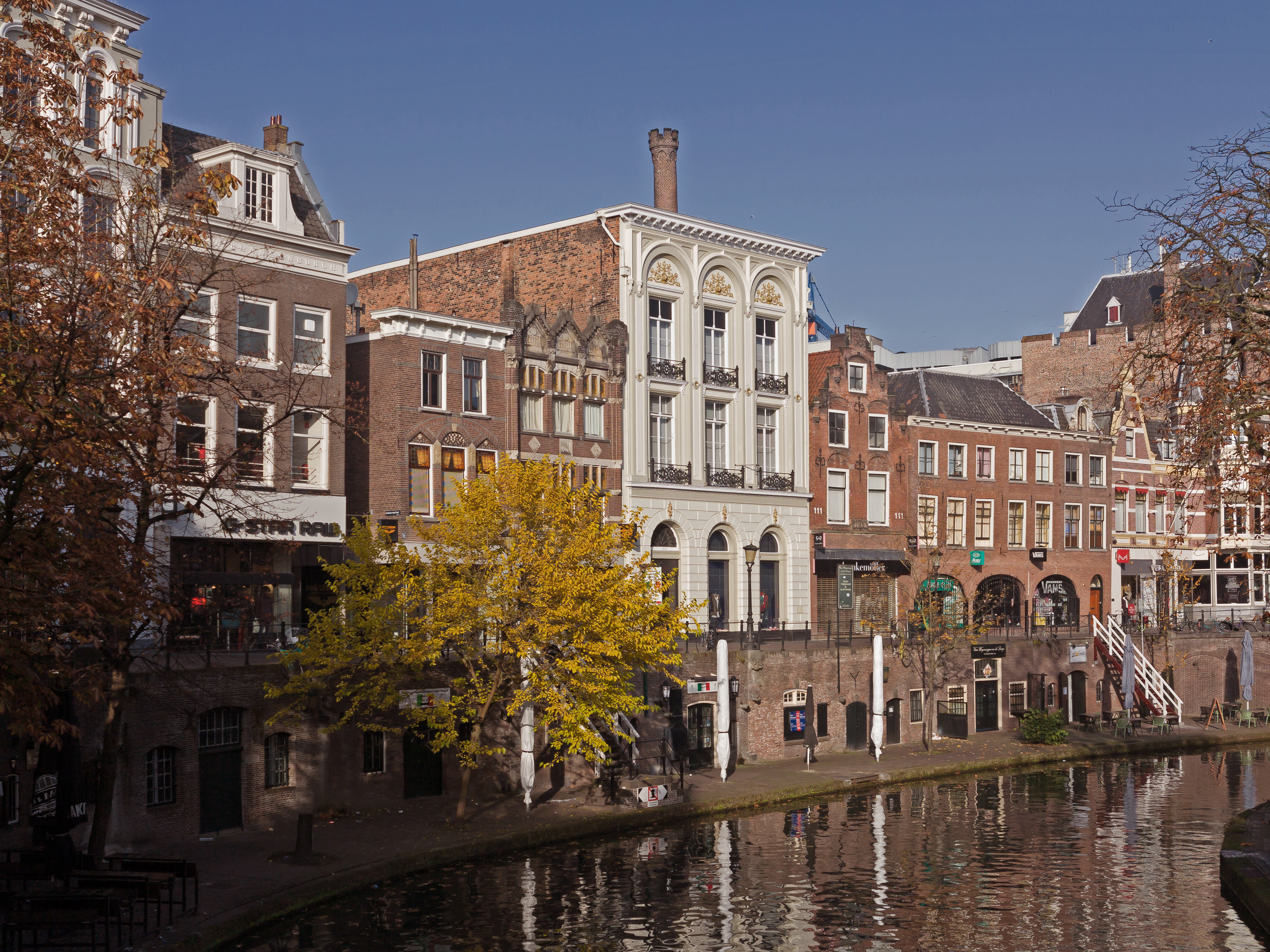
Monumental houses at the Oudegracht

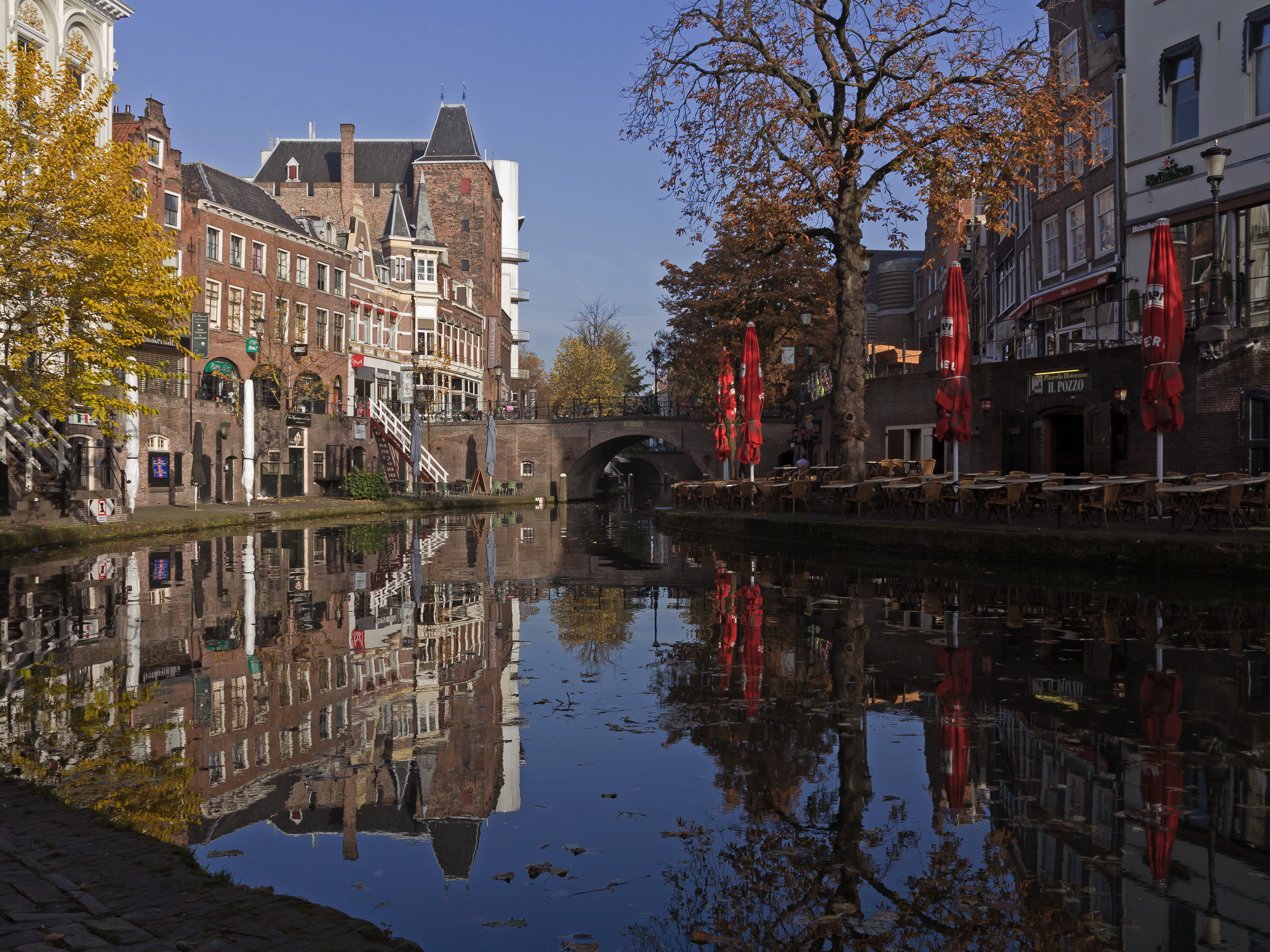
Bridge (de Jansbrug) with monumental houses

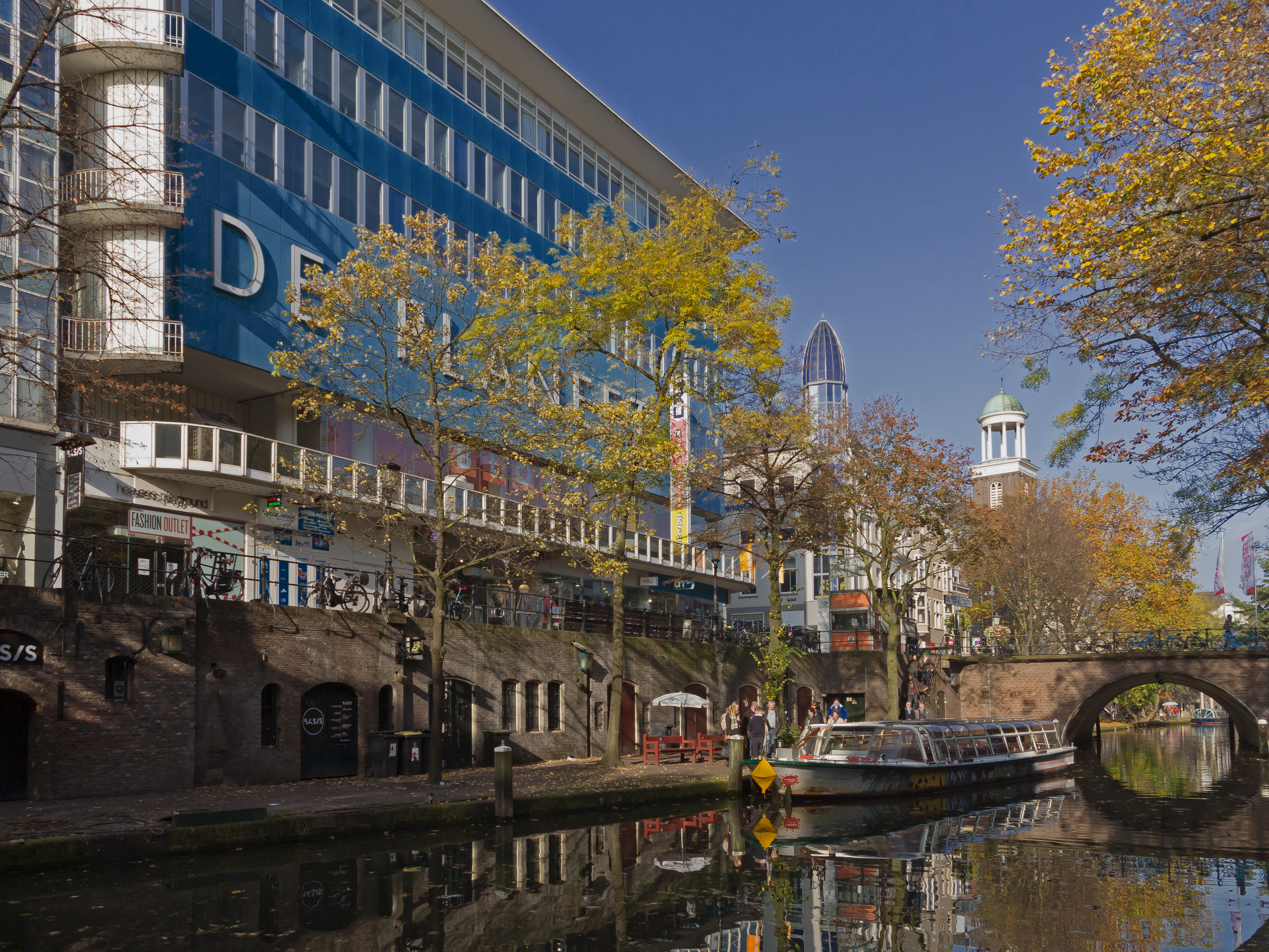
Shopping mall (de Planeet) and bridge (de Viebrug)

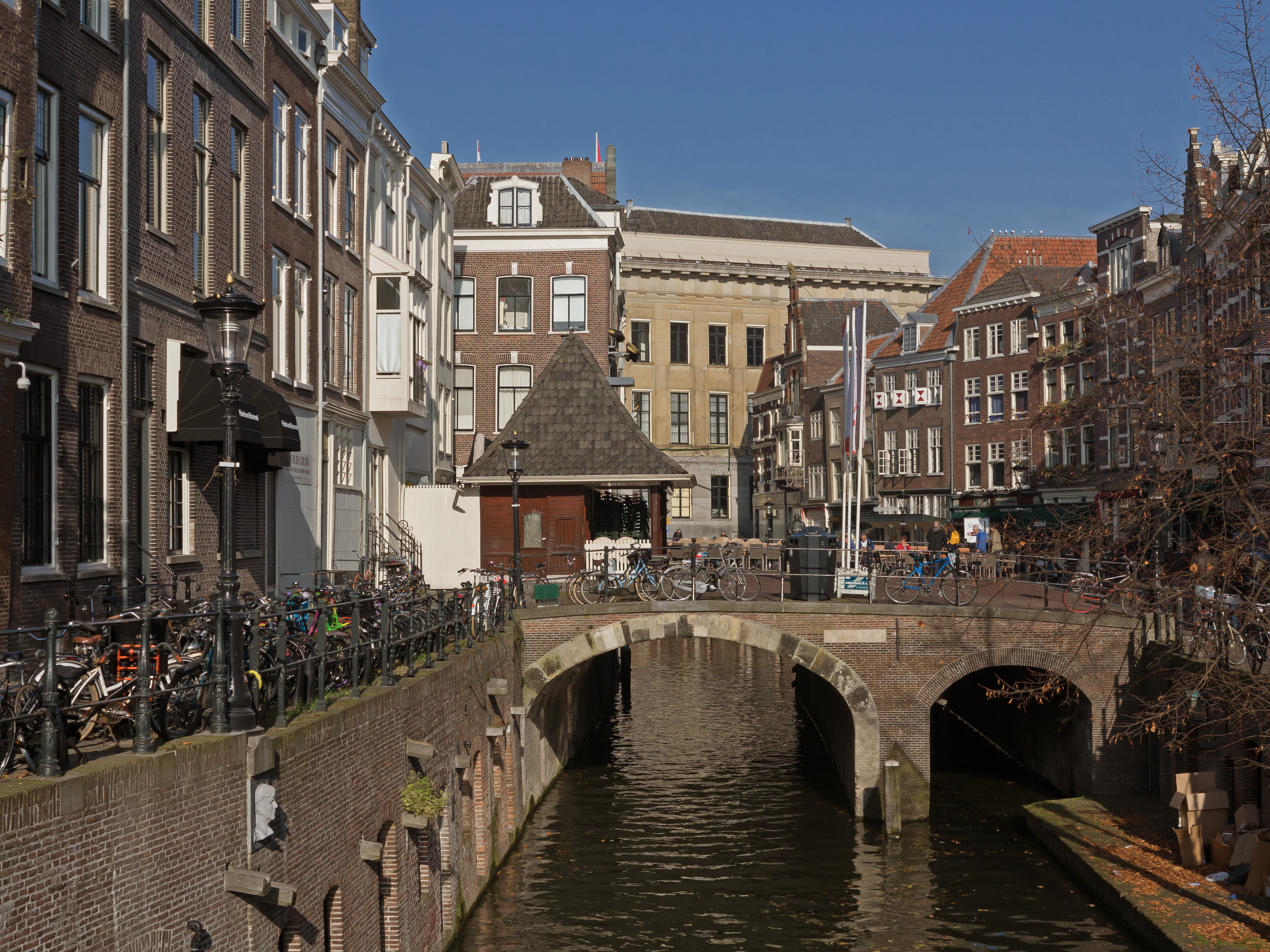
View to de Vismarkt-Choorstraat from bridge (de Maartensbrug)

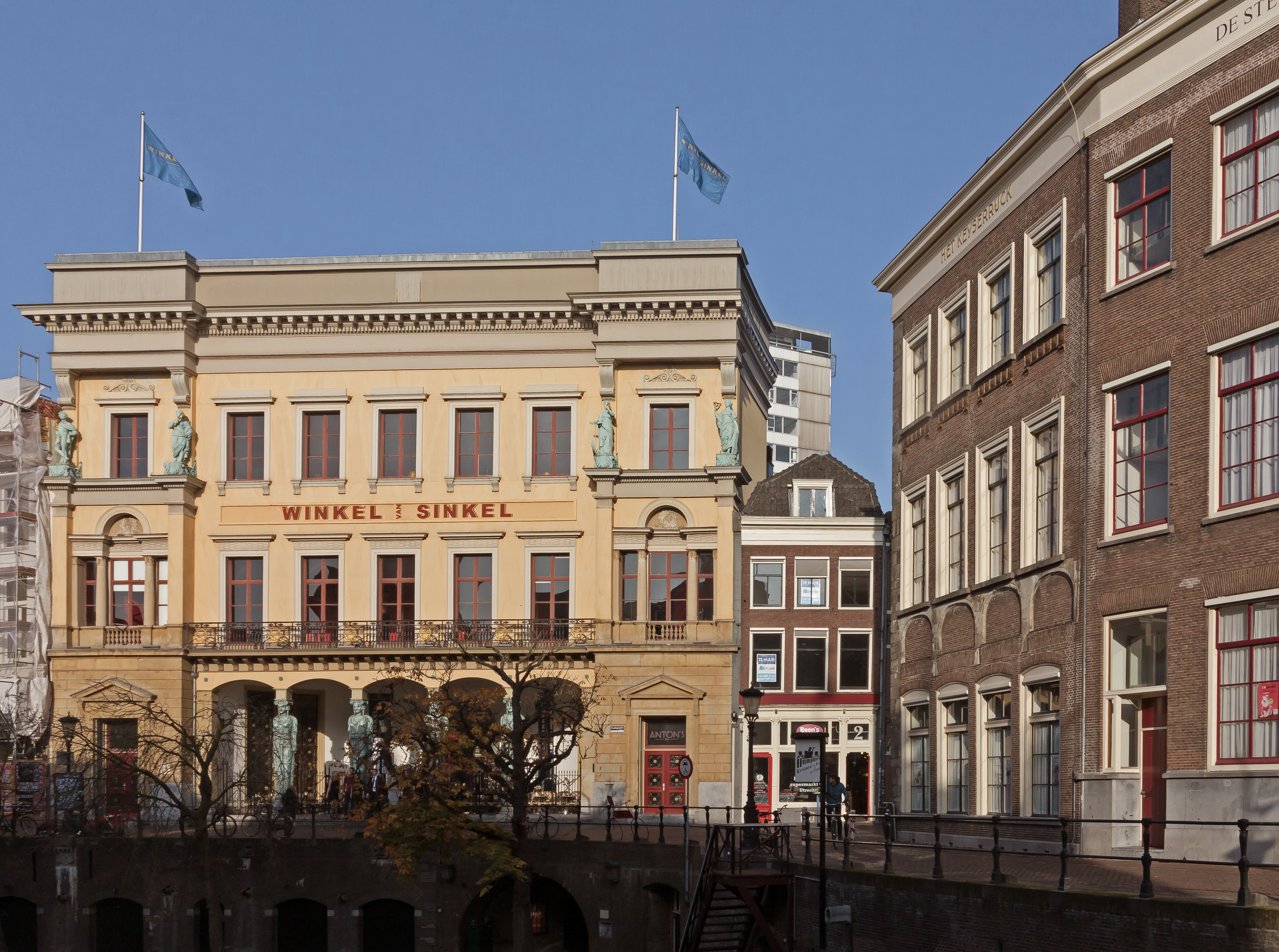
Bar: de Winkel van Sinkel
