= Vredenburg Castle =

Former castle in Utrecht

- Kasteel Vredenburg
- Utrecht, the Netherlands
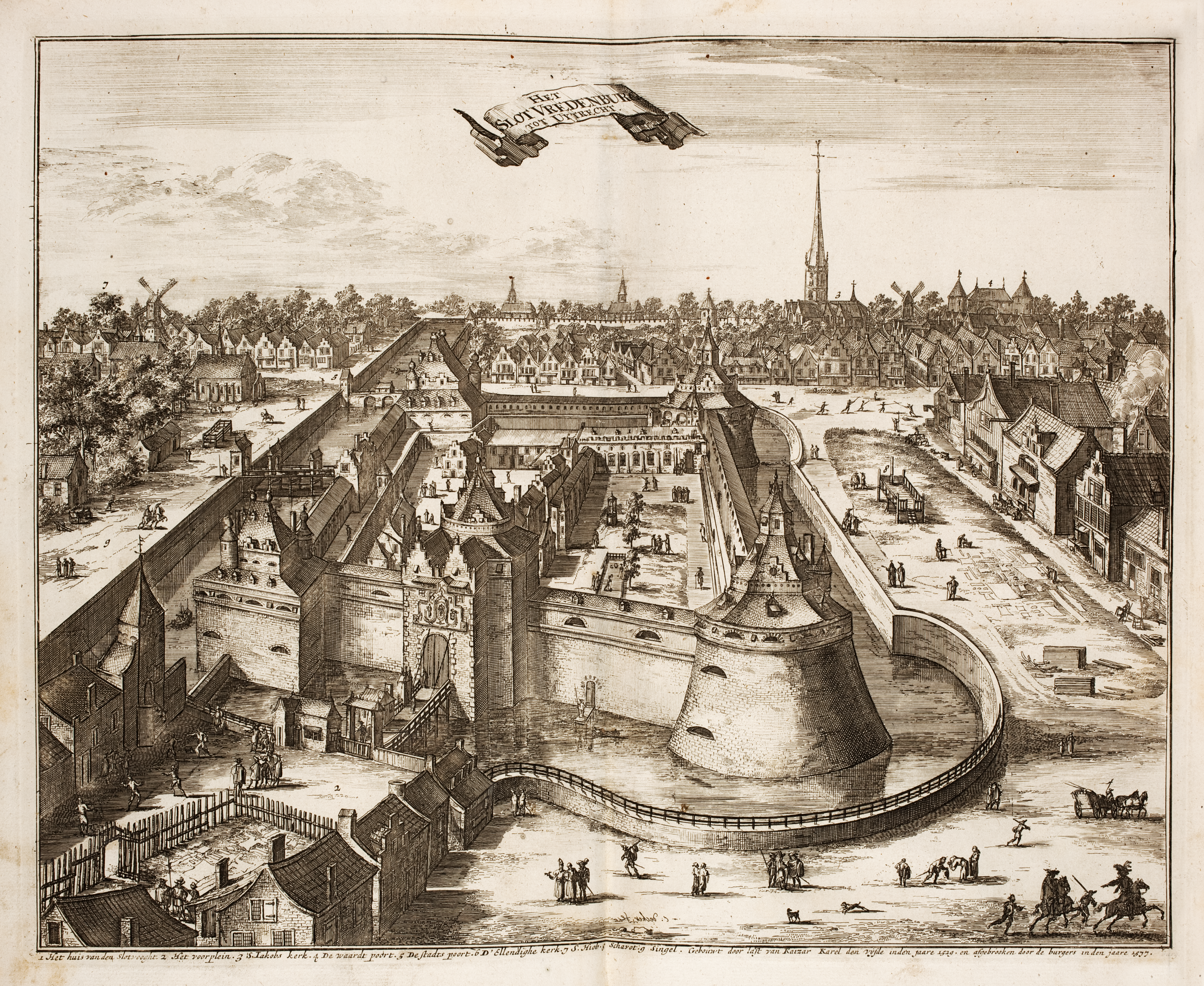
- Etching of the castle, ca. 1540

Site information
- Type: Castle
- Open to the public: yes (foundations)

Location
- Netherlands
- Coordinates: 52°05′33″N 5°06′50″E

Site history
- Built: 1529-1532
- Built by: Charles V
- Demolished: 1581 / 1919

Documentary movie of the excavations in 1976

Vredenburg Castle (Dutch: (Kasteel) Vredenburg or Vredeborch) was a 16th-century castle built by Habsburg emperor Charles V in the city of Utrecht in the Netherlands. Some remains of the castle, which stood for only 50 years, are still visible on what is now Vredenburg square in Utrecht.

== History ==
In 1528, the Holy Roman Empire annexed the Bishopric of Utrecht, and Emperor Charles V immediately ordered the construction of a castle in Utrecht, not only to protect the domain from invasion by the duke of Guelders, but also to retain control over the city's unruly population. Construction began in 1529 and was completed in 1532.

On 8 November 1576, the States General of the Seventeen Provinces ratified an agreement, known as the Pacification of Ghent, to remove Spanish occupying soldiers. In response the castle's Spanish garrison prepared to be besieged by the Dutch rebels, turning the castle's cannons towards the city itself.

By December, the siege was underway and fighting broke out between the Spanish and Dutch. However, the garrison abandoned the castle on 11 February 1577, following negotiations between garrison commander Francesco Fernando d'Avila and Maximilien de Hénin-Liétard, the count of Bossu, who served as temporary Dutch stadholder. The abandonment was part of a general withdrawal agreed upon by the new Governor-General Don Juan one day later, on 12 February.

The citizens of Utrecht demanded that the castle be demolished to prevent the Spanish or other foreign powers from dominating the city again in future. However, the city government opposed demolition, so as not to offend the emperor. On 2 May, the population took the matter into their own hands. According to legend, a group of local women led by Trijn van Leemput stormed the castle and Trijn gave the signal for the castle to be destroyed by removing the first bricks from the castle walls. Despite doubts about the historical accuracy of this tale, a statue of Trijn van Leemput was erected on the Zandbrug bridge in Utrecht in 1955.

The demolition of the castle lasted until 1581. The two western towers remained standing, as they were part of the outer city walls. However, they were also demolished piece by piece in the following centuries; by 1919 they had completely disappeared. The foundations of Vredenburg castle were uncovered during archaeological excavations in 1976 and 1978.

== Old prints and excavations ==
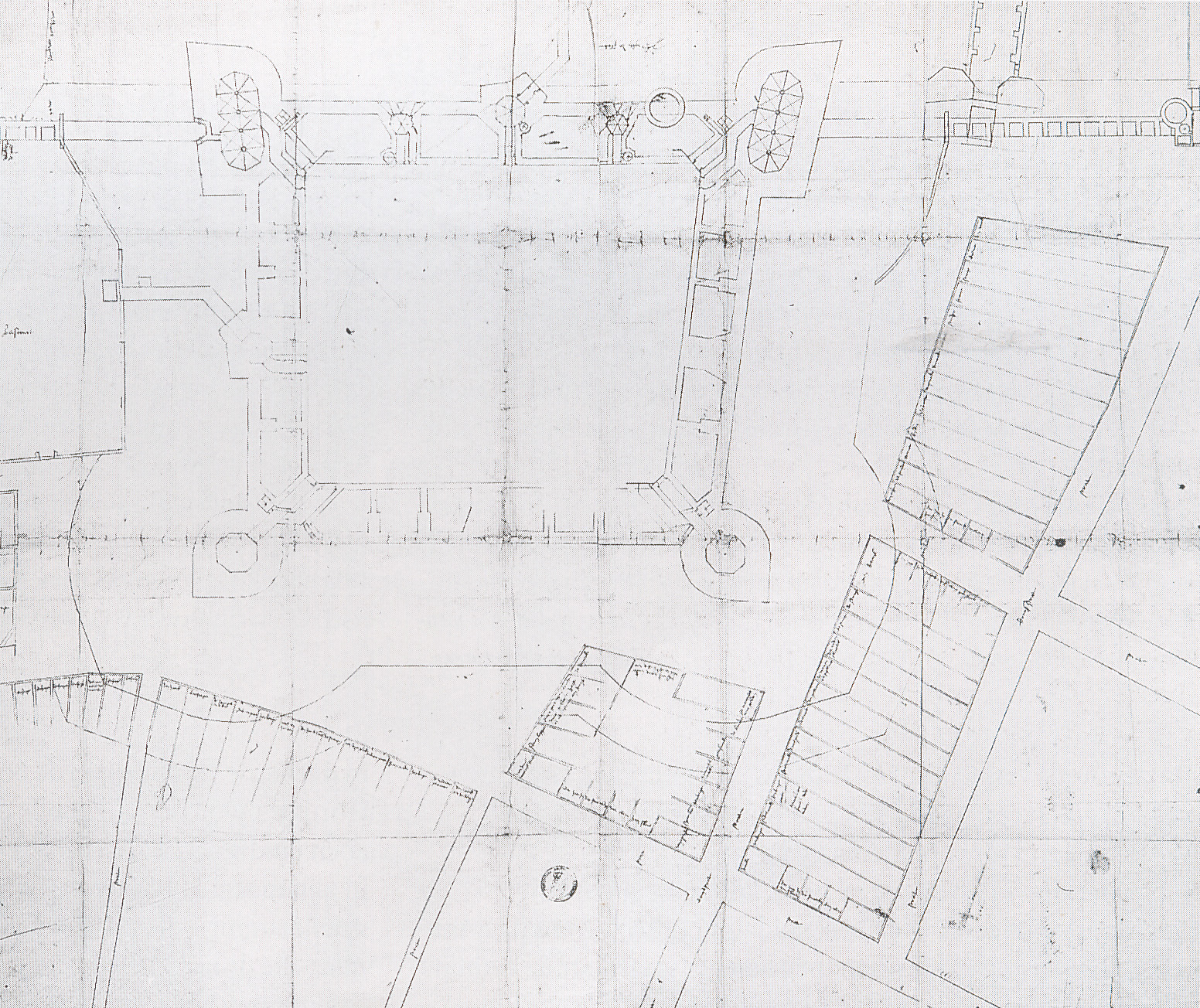
Design by Rombout II Keldermans, 1529

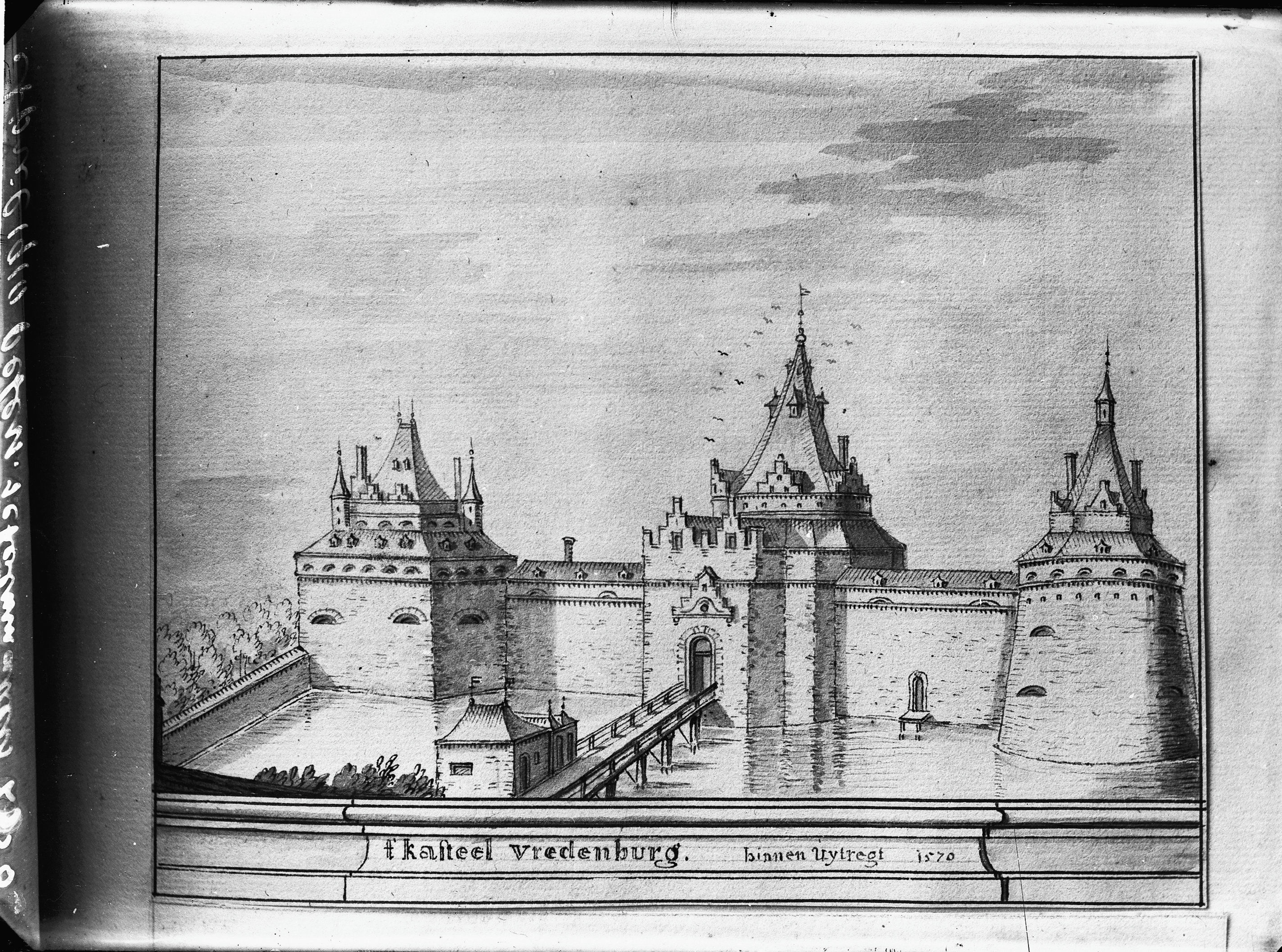
Drawing, 1570

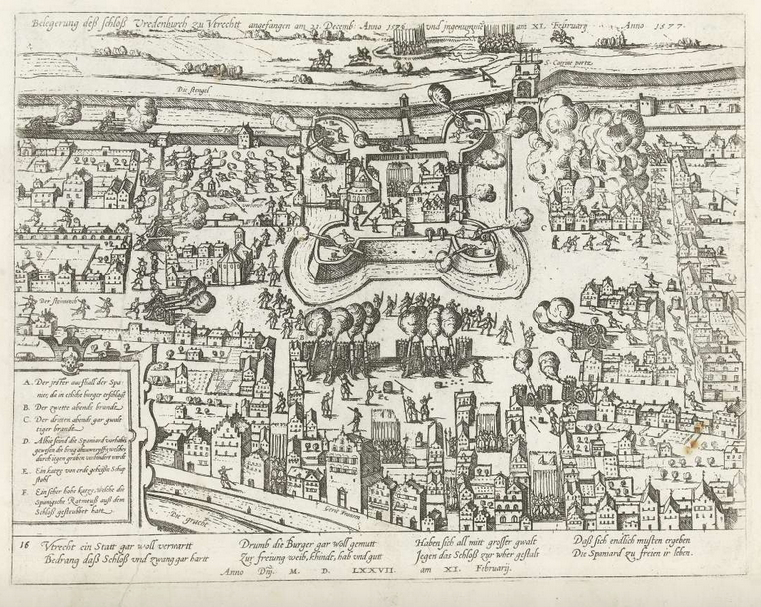
Siege of Vredenburg

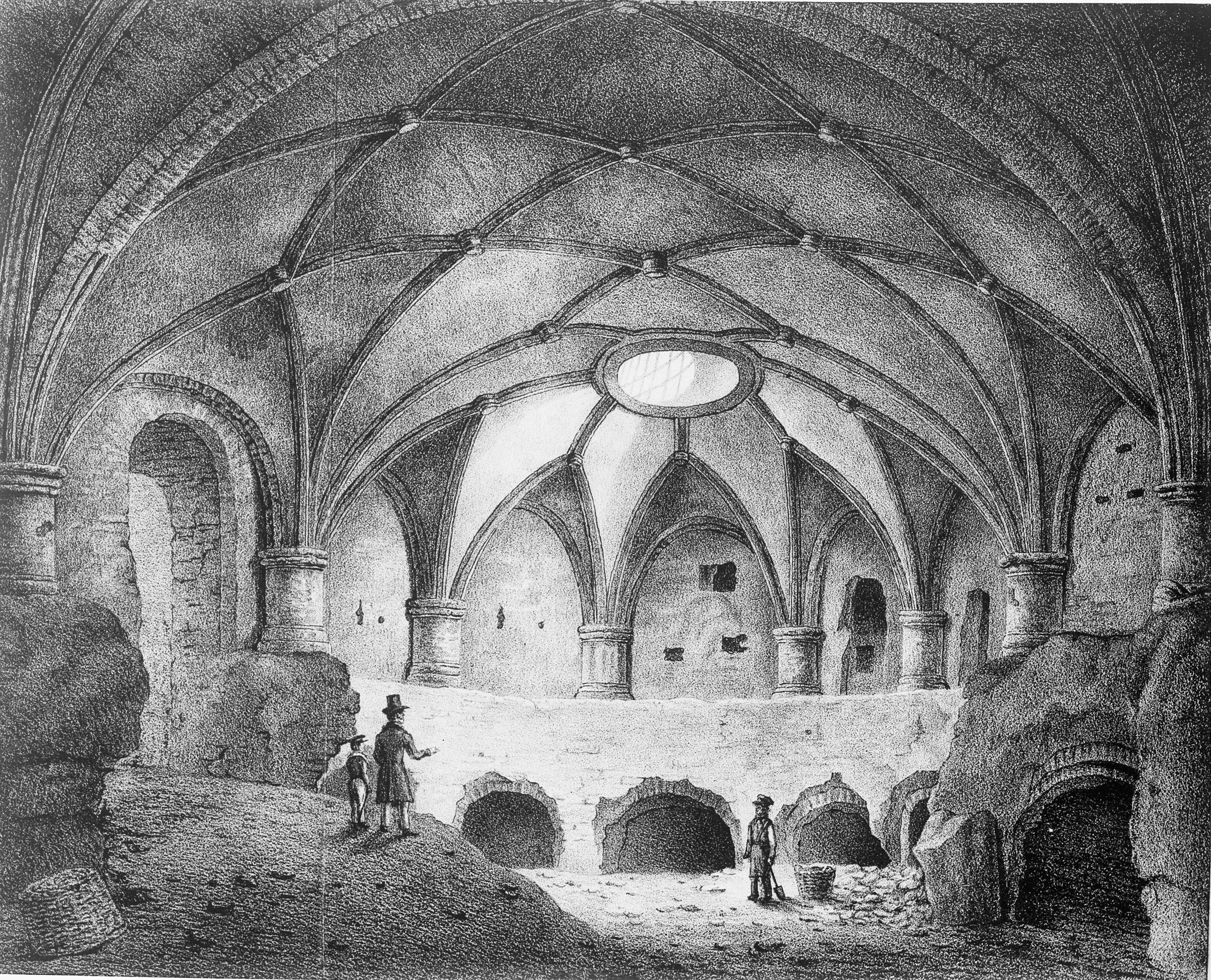
Southern vault, litho 1837

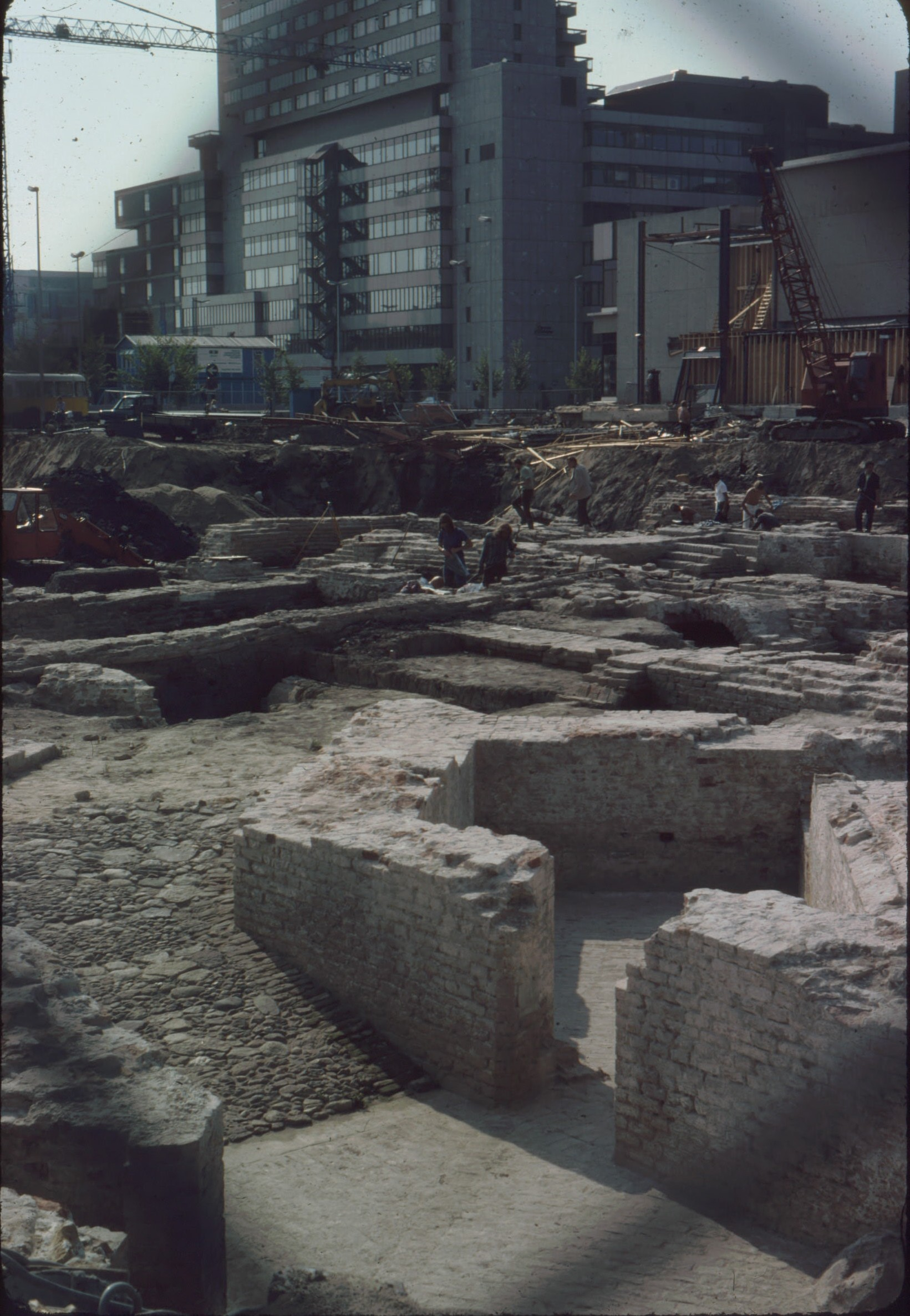
The castle foundations in 1976

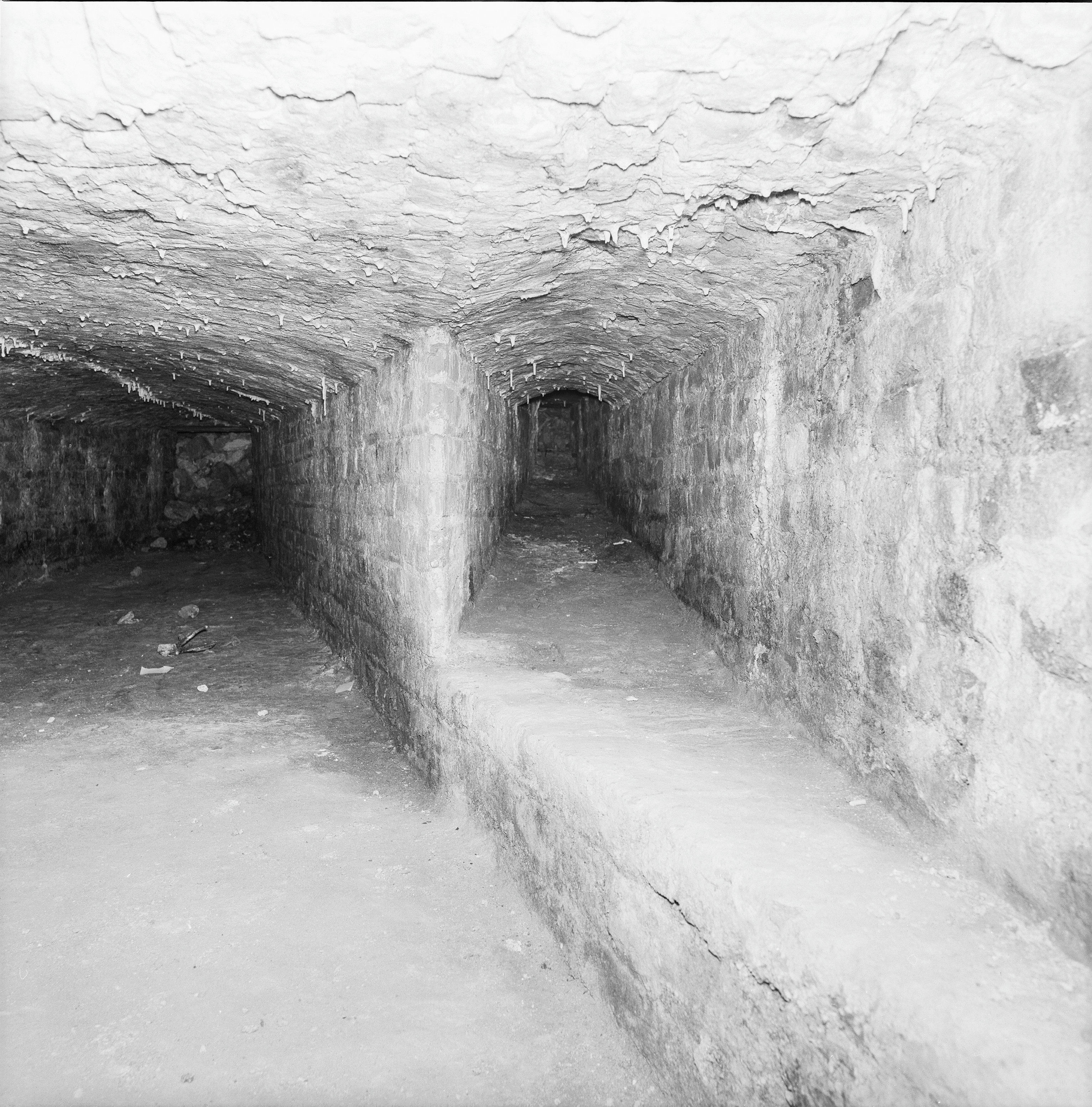
Photo 10

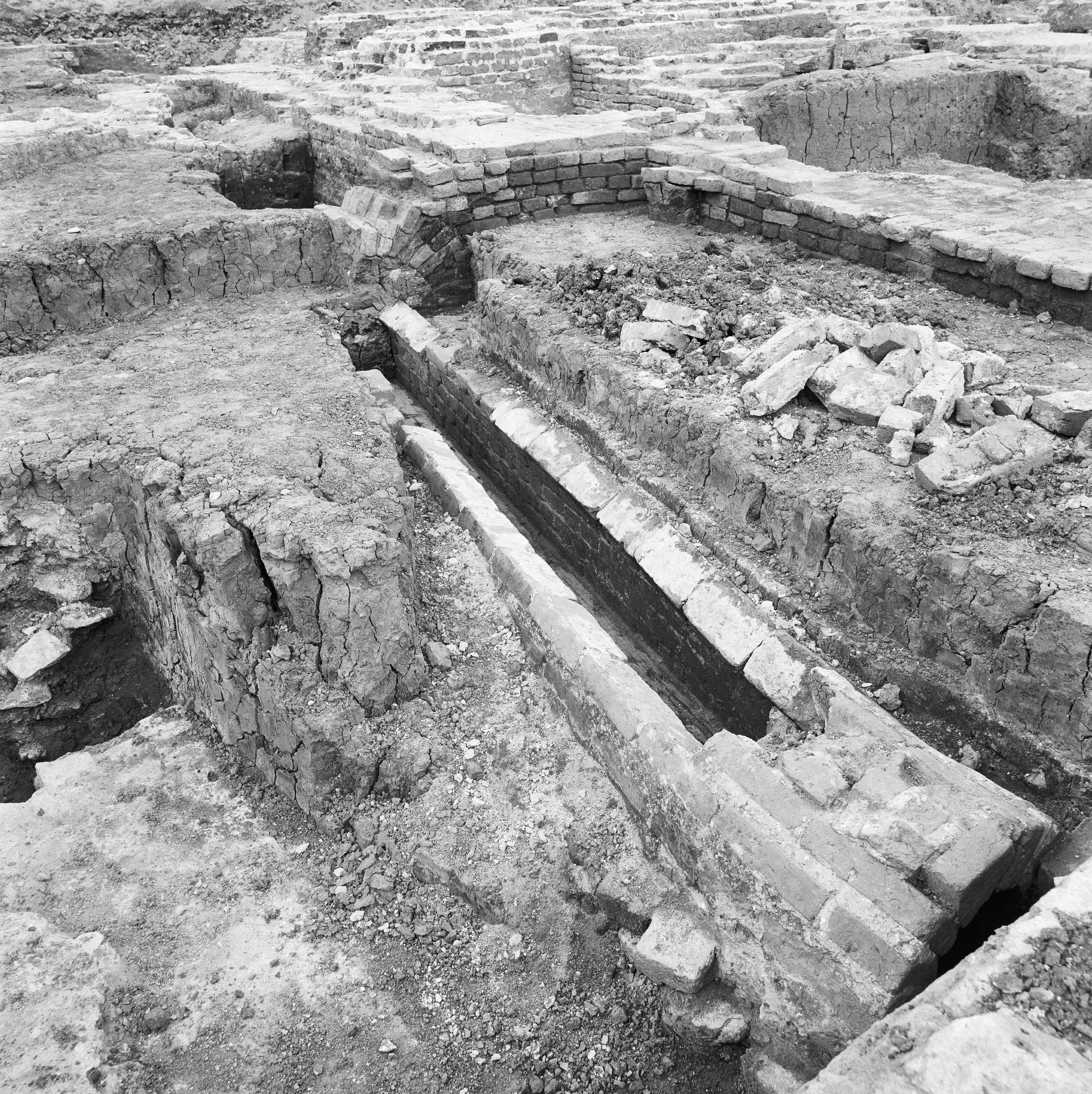
Photo 13

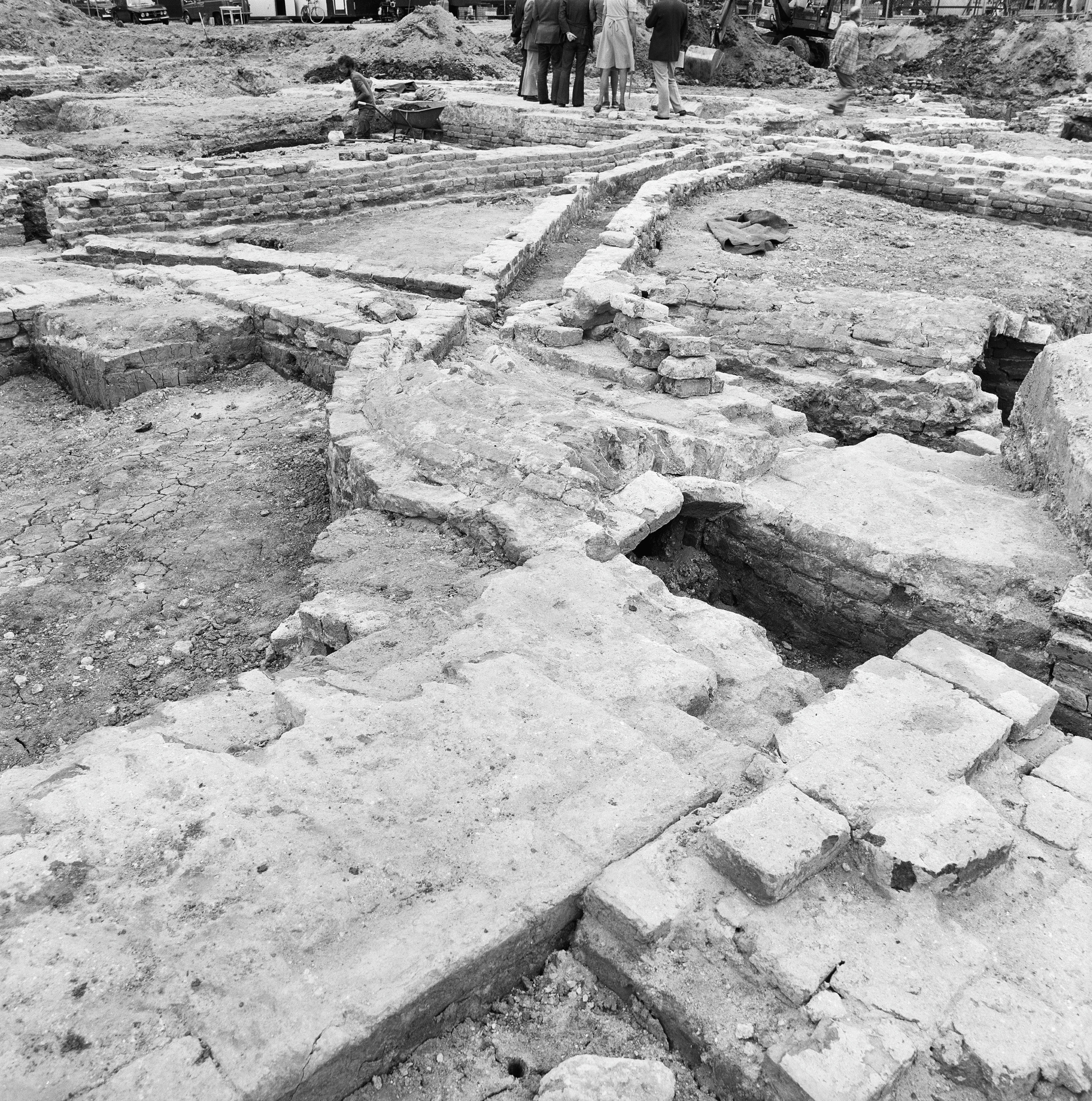
Photo 45

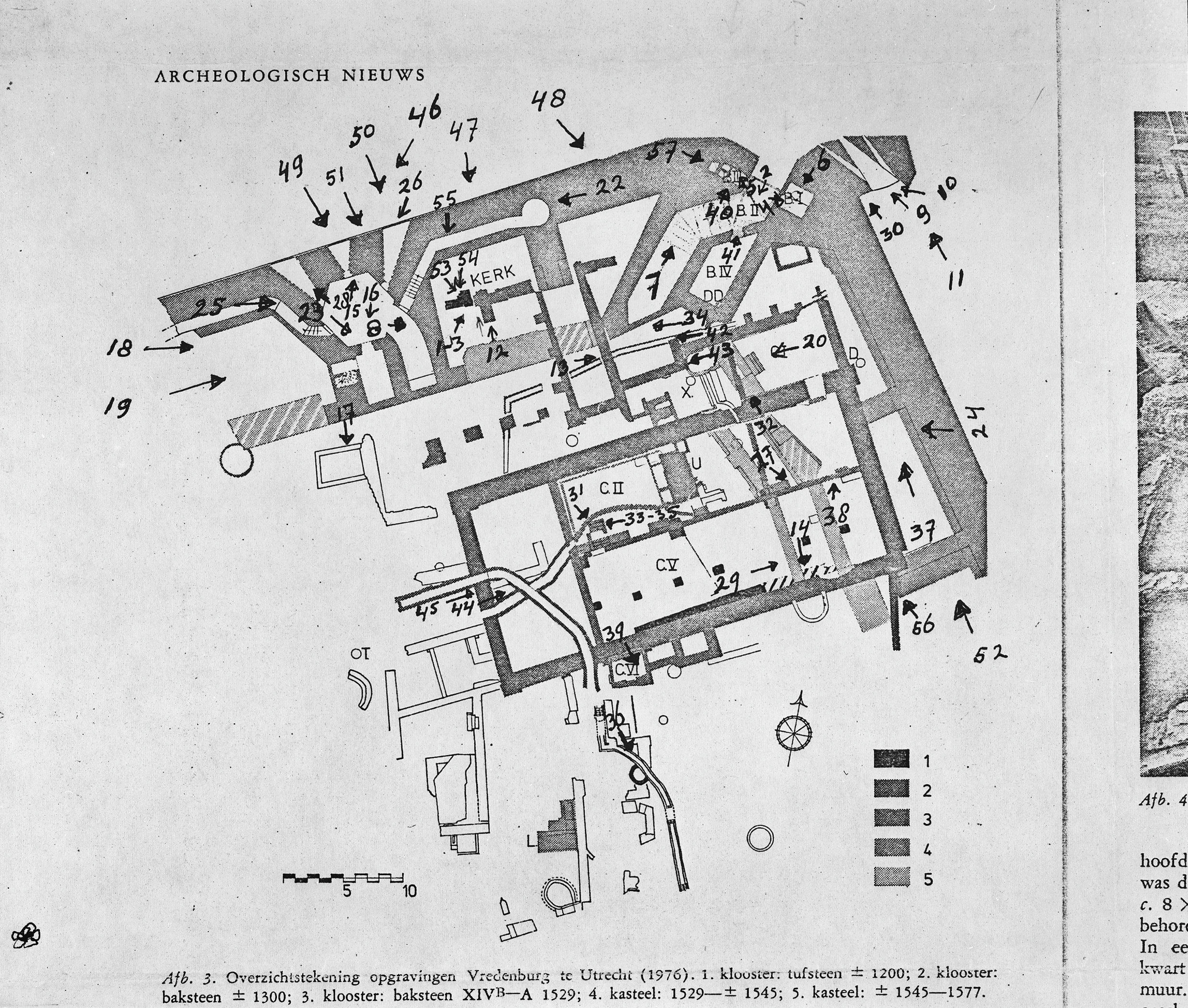
Map of the excavations with locations photographs, 1970's

== See also ==
- Catharijne
- List of castles in the Netherlands

== Sources ==
- Kastelen in Utrecht (Dutch)
- De Dom Digitaal (Dutch)
