= Lauwerecht =

Municipality in Utrecht, the Netherlands

Coordinates: 52°05′04″N 5°06′44″E

Lauwerecht is a former municipality in the Dutch province of Utrecht. It was located northwest of the city of Utrecht and existed from 1818 to 1823. It is now part of Utrecht.
