= Utrecht Public Library =

Dutch public library

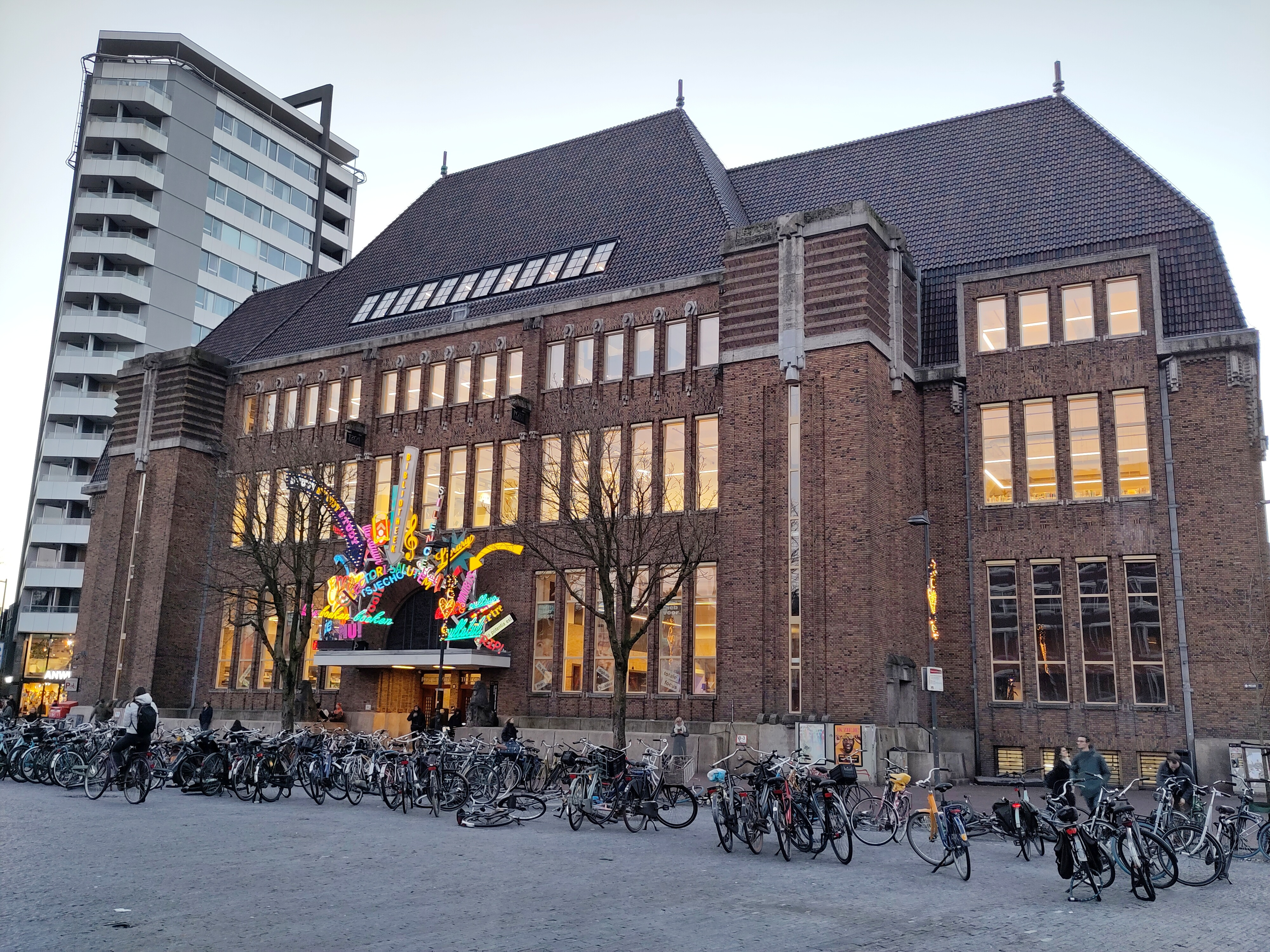
- Main seat of Utrecht Public Library (Dutch: Openbare bibliotheek) at Neude square, Utrecht, the Netherlands
- 52°5′35.26″N 5°7′5.44″E
- Location: Neude 11, 3512 AE Utrecht
- Established: January 8, 1892; 134 years ago
- Branches: 12 (2024)

Access and use
- Population served: visits: 1,6 million (2022), exceeding two million (2023)

Other information
- Director: Deirdre Carasso
- Website: www.bibliotheekutrecht.nl

Utrecht Public Library (Dutch: Openbare Bibliotheek Utrecht) is the public library system of the city of Utrecht, The Netherlands, consisting of a large central city library in the former Utrecht Post Office and twelve further branches.

== Neighborhood branches ==
In 1910 the first branch was inaugurated: a small 'wisselbibliotheekje' (small book swap library) of thirty books in the Jaffa neighbourhood. In 1918 a branch was opened at Sweelinckstraat, Utrecht, followed by another one in the neighbourhood Ondiep in 1919.

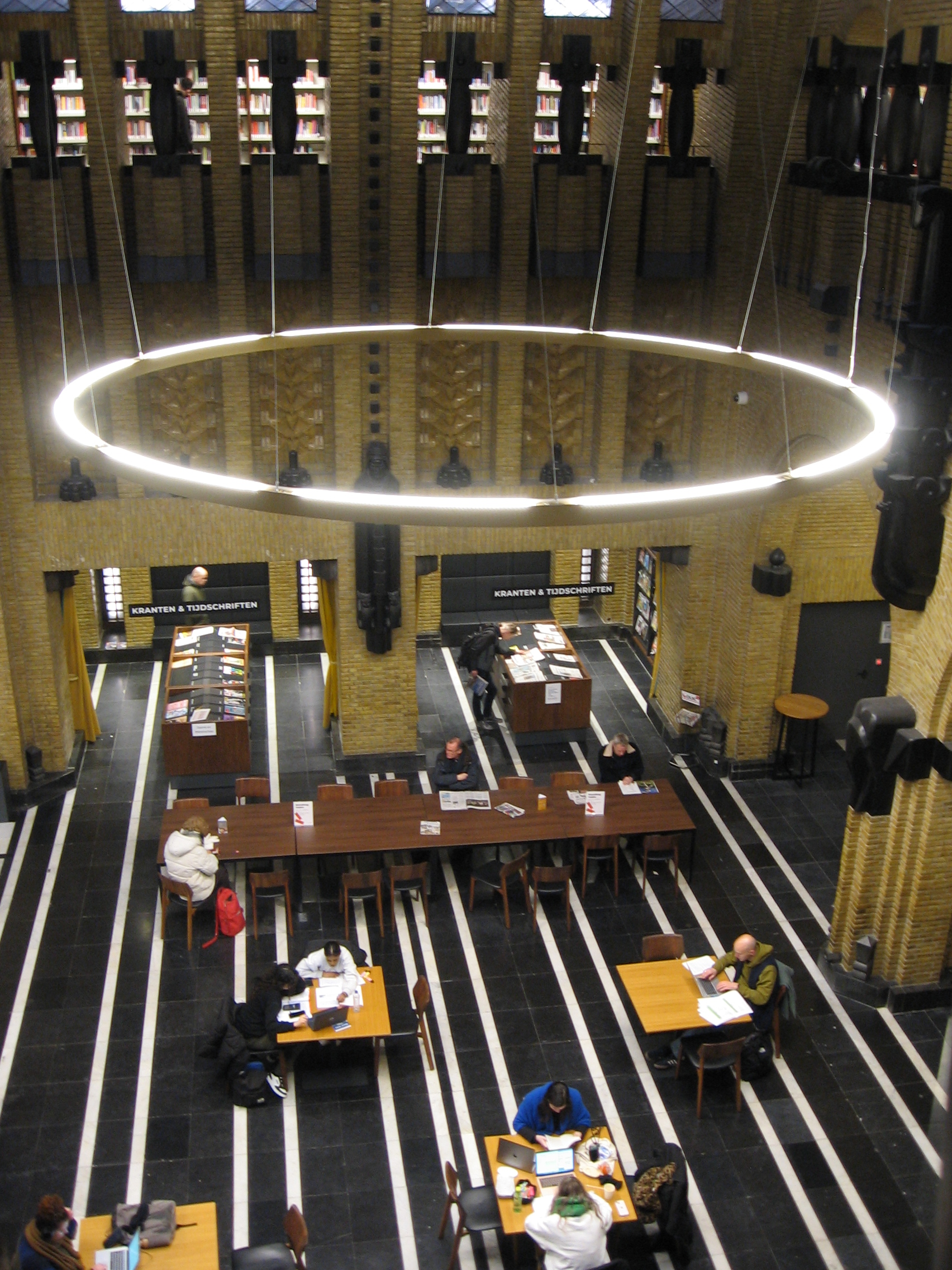
Main hall, Main library Neude, Utrecht, 2023.

In January 2024 the Public Library Utrecht counted twelve branches (libraries, bibliotheken) apart from the main establishment at Neude, Utrecht:

- Bibliotheek Neude in the city centre
- Bibliotheek Hoograven
- Bibliotheek Lunetten
- Bibliotheek Overvecht
- Bibliotheek Tuinwijk (Utrecht)
- Bibliotheek Vleuterweide
- Bibliotheek Zuilen
- Bibliotheek De Meern
- Bibliotheek Kanaleneiland
- Bibliotheek Oog in Al
- Bibliotheek Leidsche Rijn Centrum
- Bibliotheek Vleuten
- Jeugdbibliotheek Waterwin, Leidsche Rijn

In 2023 more than 2 million visits were registered, in 2022 1,6 million, with more than 1 million loans of children's books in 2022.

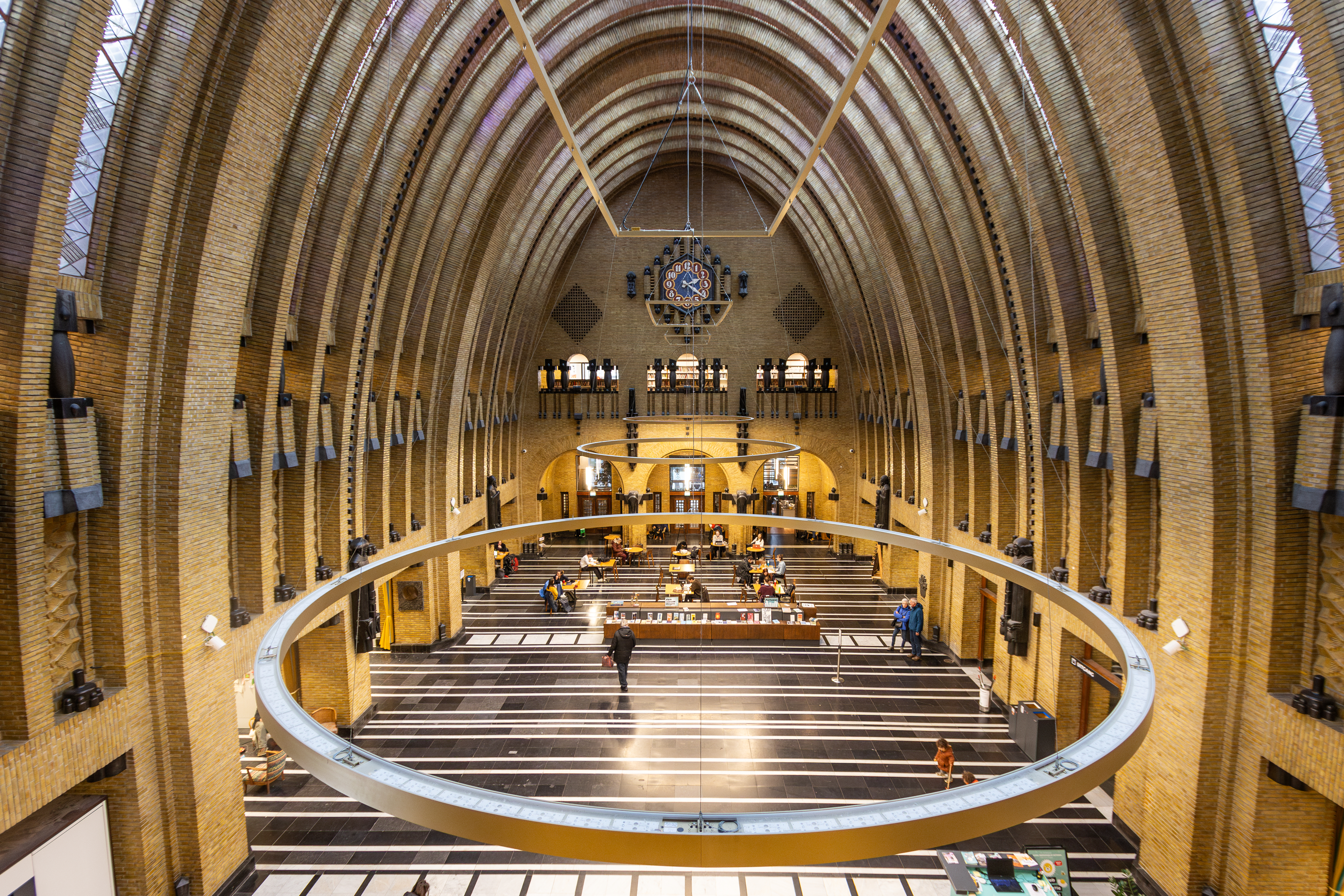
Main hall, Central library Neude Utrecht, 2023.

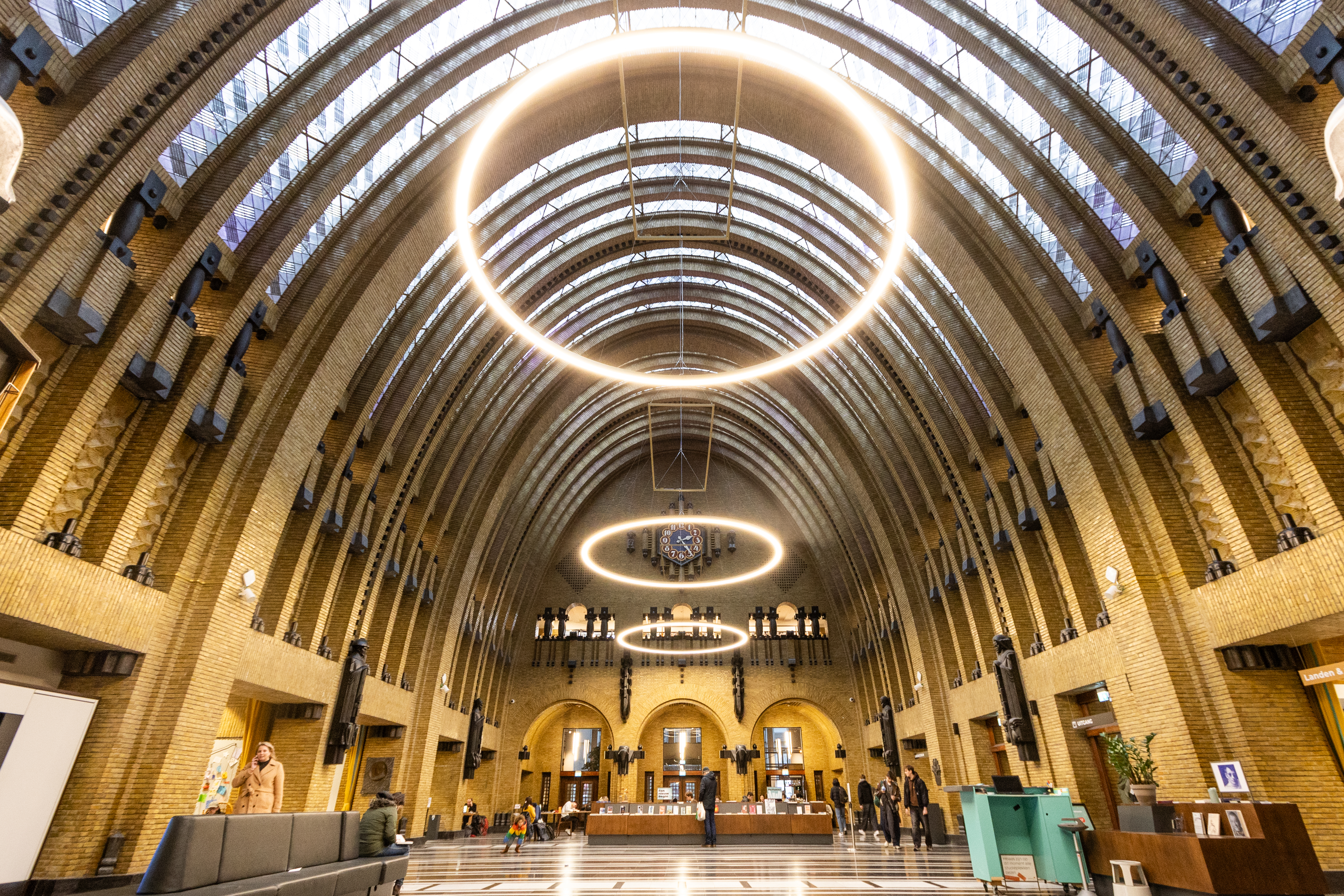
Main hall, Central library Neude Utrecht, 2023.

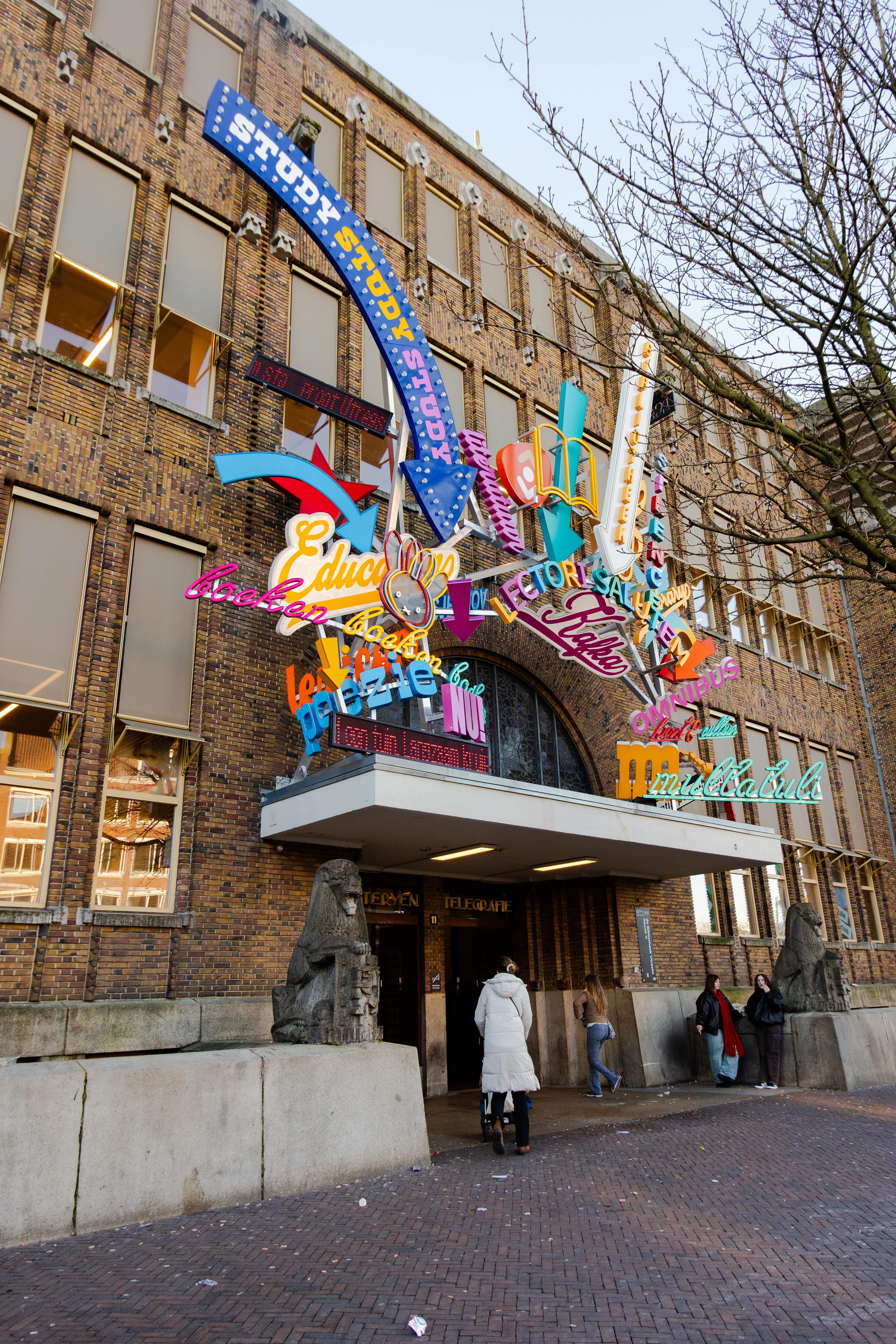
Entrance with art work Intellectual heritage by Maarten Baas.

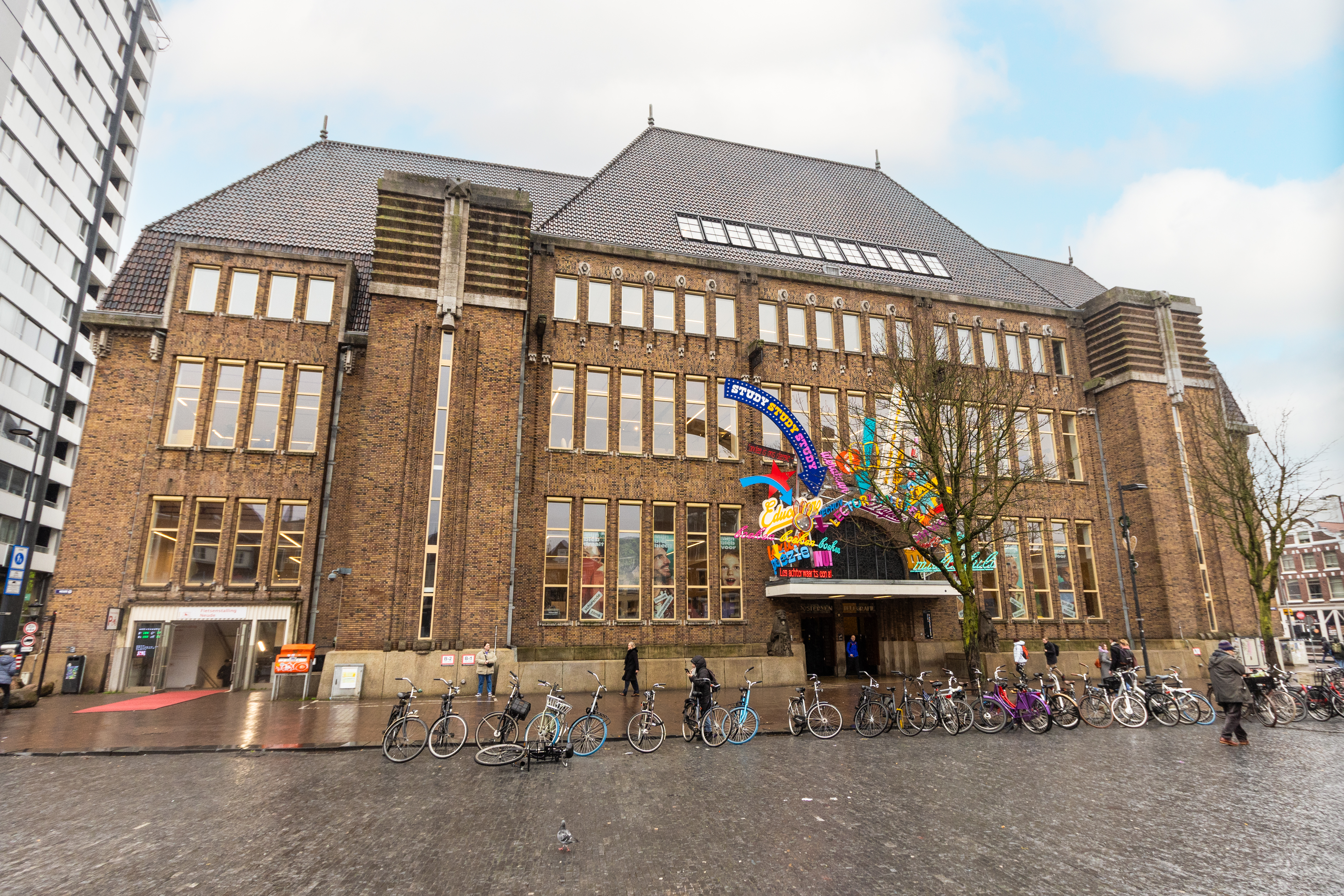
Front, Central library Neude Utrecht, 2023.

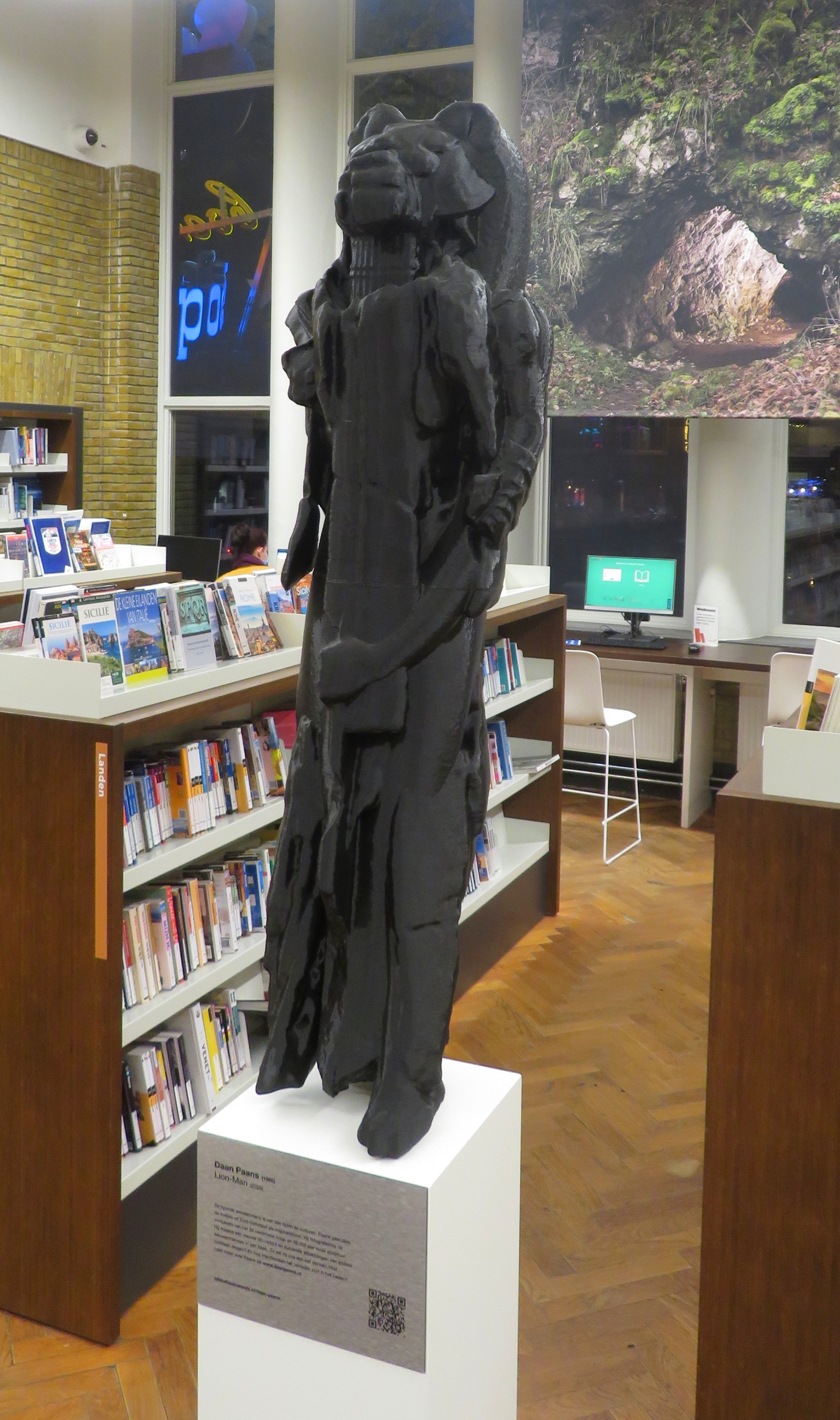
Lion-man by Daan Paans. Department Reizen (Travel), Library Neude Utrecht, 2023.

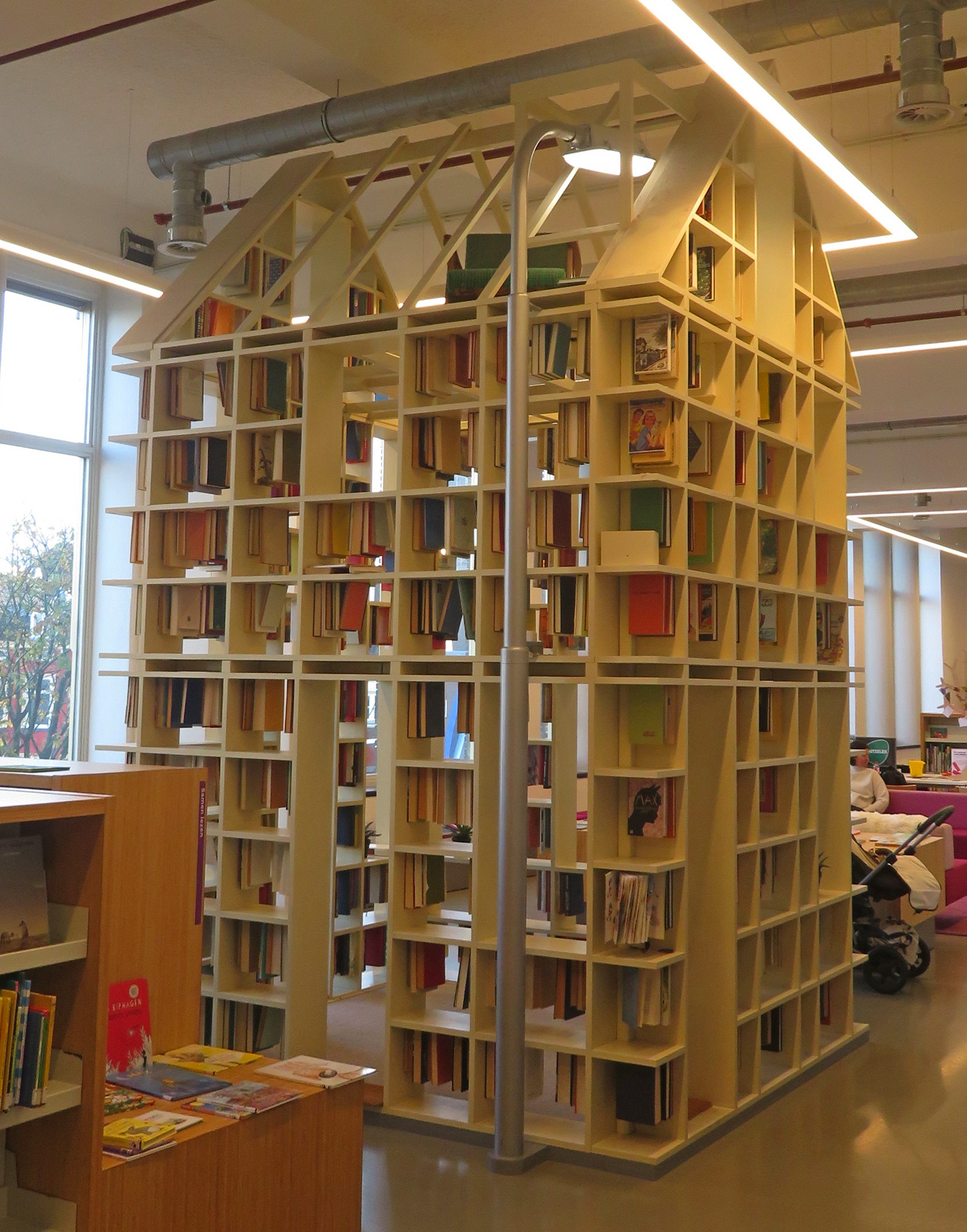
Boekenhuis (House of Books) by Frank Halmans. Department Jeugd (Youth), Library Neude Utrecht, 2024.

== See also ==
- Utrecht Post Office
