= Utrecht (agglomeration) =

Utrecht (agglomeration) Utrecht (agglomeratie)
- Urban area
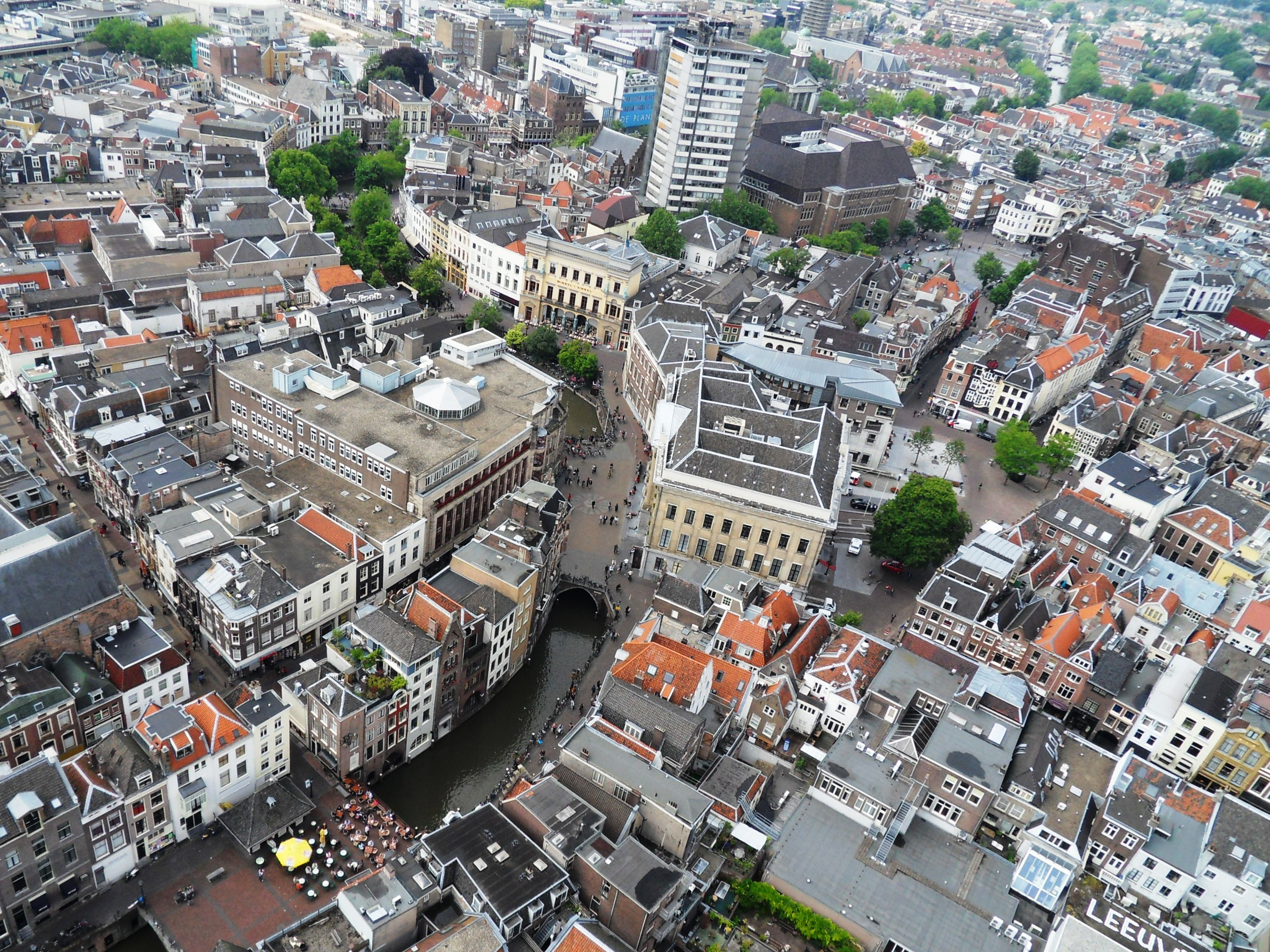
- Skyline of Utrecht

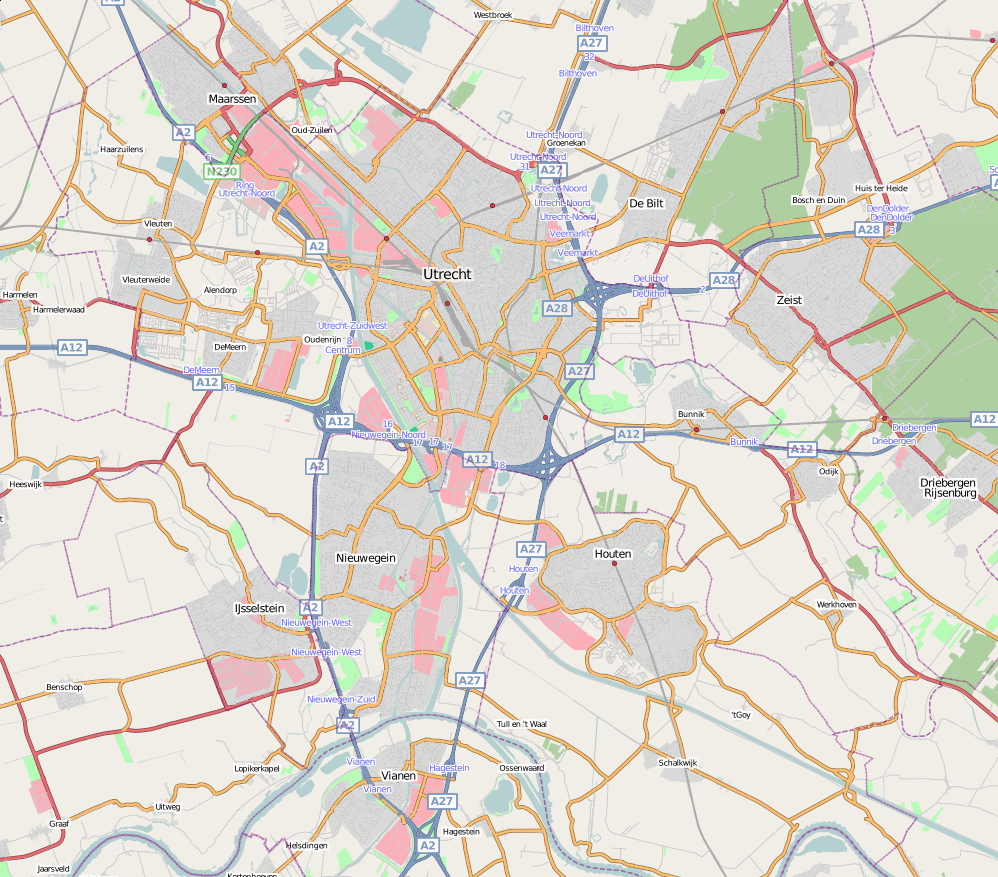
- Country: Netherlands
- Largest city: Utrecht

Area
  - Urban: 500 km^{2} (190 sq mi)

Population
  - Urban: 710,531
  - Urban density: 1,400/km^{2} (3,700/sq mi)

The city of Utrecht and the surrounding cities, villages, and townships form an agglomeration in the middle of The Netherlands. It is located entirely in the province of Utrecht, and is the eastern part of so-called North Wing the larger Randstad urban area.

The agglomeration has a population of about 690,000 people (a rough estimate based on data collected in 2001–2012). The following towns are commonly recognized as part of the agglomeration:

Town	Population
Utrecht (including De Uithof and Vleuten-De Meern)	370,428 (as of August 2023)
Nieuwegein	65,709 (as of August 2023)
Zeist	51,071 (as of 2012)
Houten	48,408 (as of 2012)
Stichtse Vecht	62,518 (as of 2012)
IJsselstein	34,217 (as of 2012)
Bilthoven	42,058 (as of 2012)
Driebergen-Rijsenburg	18,490 (as of 2008)
Vianen	19,658 (as of 2012)
Bunnik	14,553 (as of 2012)

This interpretation of what is to be acknowledged the greater Utrecht area, is the most common one. The physically joint urban area (the innercity-Utrecht area and its surrounding authentic quarters, boroughs and outskirts; the town of Maarssen, which is connected to Utrecht by the Utrecht district of Zuilen and the Lage Weide industrial area; Nieuwegein which has grown attached to the south of the city during the seventies and nineties. To which are attached the smaller suburban towns of IJsselstein and Vianen; the former villages of De Meern and Vleuten, which have been annexed - also formally - by the Utrecht municipality and the western city expansion of Leidsche Rijn; the chained towns of De Bilt and Bilthoven, who are nearly connected to the east side of the city with less than a mile of recreational areas and infrastructure separating both) houses around half a million people. The other 100–200.000 inhabitants making up the entire agglomeration population mostly live in slightly more distant towns such as Zeist, Bunnik, Houten, Breukelen etc. These suburban towns and villages are situated, averagely about four of five miles from the outer districts of Utrecht city. The larger economic, cultural and educational area of which the city of Utrecht is the main centre is equal to the province of Utrecht excluding the small agglomeration of Amersfoort and the town of Veenendaal (which are more self-sufficient and self-orientated). It provides shopping facilities, employment, some large hospitals, cinemas, recreation and other facilities for around 800.000 people. If Woerden, Breukelen and Culemborg are to by included in the greater Utrecht area (seen the vast forensism towards the city) the population would be around 750.000.

In the 1970s and 1980s, large residential areas were built in Maarssen and Zeist, as well as in the new town Nieuwegein. In the 1990s, construction of new houses was concentrated in the new town Houten and in the Leidsche Rijn neighbourhood.
