= The Ships of De Meern =

Preserved Dutch Roman ships

Ships of De Meern
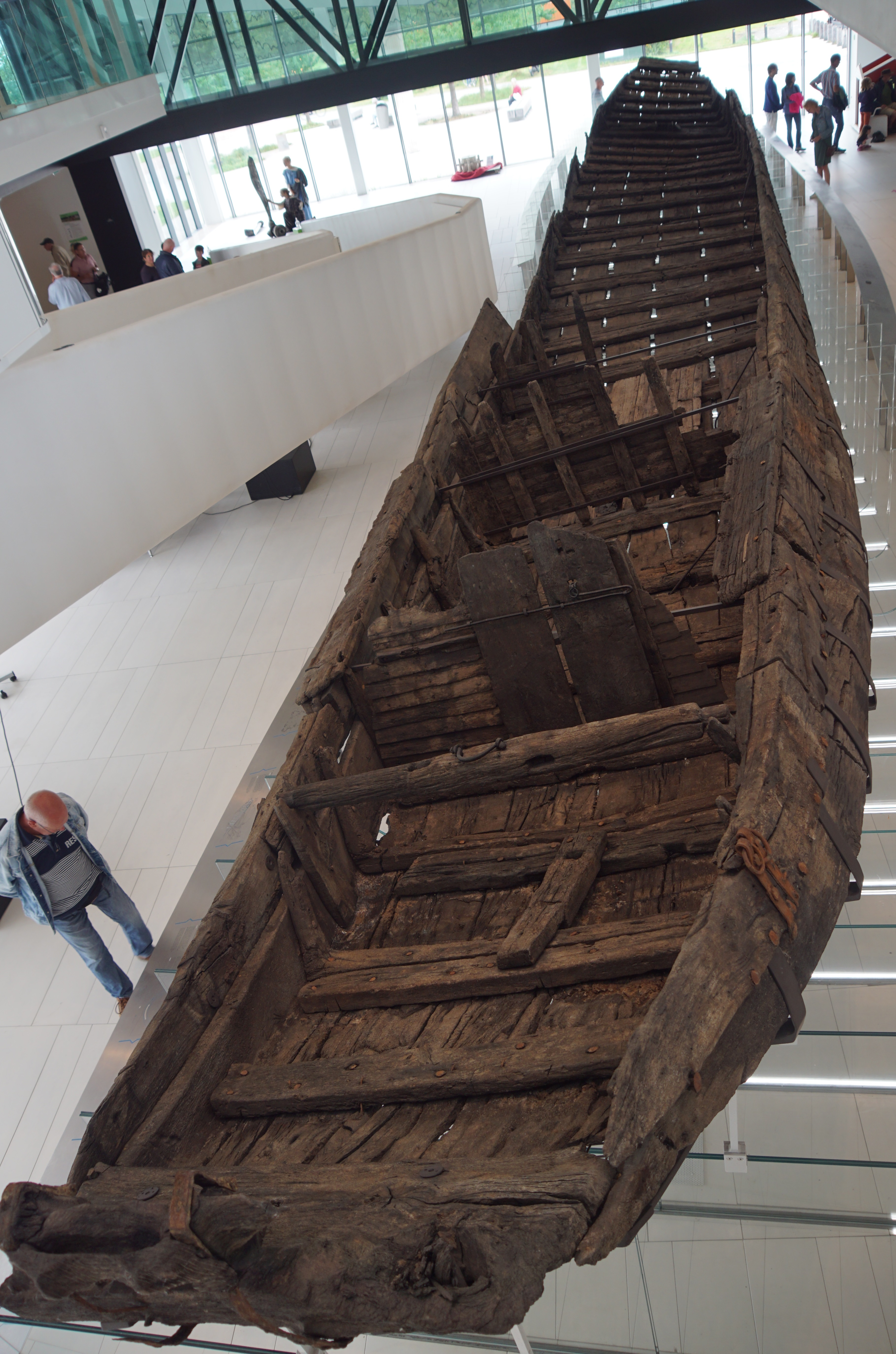
- The De Meern 1
- Created: 85-200 AD
- Period/culture: Roman Empire
- Discovered: 1997-2008; De Meern, Utrecht, Netherlands
- Present location: Museum Hoge Woerd

The Ships of De Meern are the collective name for a set of Dutch Roman wooden vessels in the town of De Meern, Utrecht.

From 1997 to 2008, a series of ships have been recovered in varying states of preservation, within the proximity of Roman castellums of Laurum (present day Woerden) and Nigrum Pullum (present day Zwammerdam) along the Rhine.

From 47 to 260 AD, the present day sites were part of the limes, part of the border frontier and defense posts of the Roman Empire, and as such, became a site of frequent military activity, with ship traffic for military personnel and supplies. As such, the ships provide insight in provenance of the region's supply chain and activities.

== De Meern 1 ==
De Meern 1 was discovered in Leidsche Rijn in 1997, but was finally excavated in 2003. Upon exhumation, the ship was measured 25 by 2.7 meters, with dendrochronology narrowing the lumber being cut around 148 AD, and being active from 150 to 200 AD.

The vessel contained a hold, a cabin, and a cooking area, and within the cabin, the captain's personal belongings, and a set of tools were preserved, found within the cupboard and a box. The tools indicate the boats use for carpentry and stonework. Military objects found within the ship indicate its owner may have been a veteran of the Roman army, who conducted repair work along the limes.

The ship was presumably wrecked due to navigational error, and the roof tiles excavated were found to have charring, which indicates traces of a fire.

The remnants of the vessel are on display at the Museum Hoge Woerd.

== De Meern 2 and 3 ==
De Meern 2 and 3 are two log canoes dated to the 2nd century.

== De Meern 4 ==
After the excavation of De Meern 1, De Meern 4 was discovered 150 meters away in 2003, excavations were subsequently made in 2005.

The ship is estimated to be 27 meters in length with the biggest beam measured at 3.7 meters. The lumber used determined a felling date of 100 AD, with the provenance of it being local in the mid-Netherlands, around Holland. The ship utilized a mixture of Mediterranean and local shipbuilding techniques, with the wood parts connected with dowels and mortise and tenon joints, though the joints are utilized in a crude manner.

The vessel was sunk as landfill, to reinforce the bank against a Roman road.

The ship was covered up after 2005 for future research.

== De Meern 5 ==
De Meern 5 was found a few decades ago, but was subsequently lost and has not been rediscovered.

== De Meern 6 ==
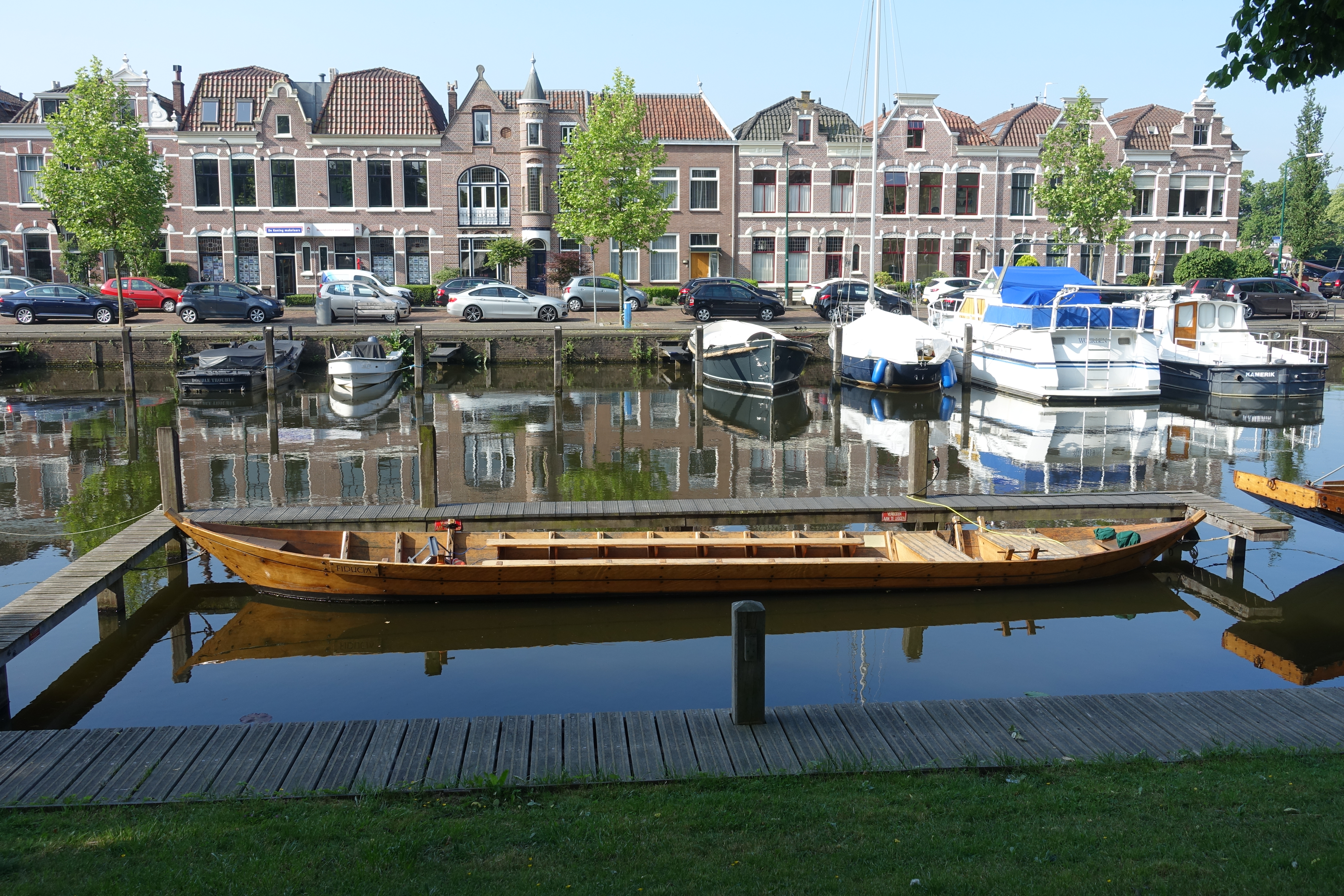
A reconstruction of the De Meern 6 in Woerden

De Meern 6 is a punt discovered in March 2008, dated to 158–180, but used as late as the 3nd century. A bottom plank and a frame was found, but the details allowed the ship to be reconstructed. It is an unclassified type of Roman ship measuring 7.49 meters by 0.62 meters, with an estimated length of 9 meters, with a lancet shaped bottom, and a notch for the bow.

== See also ==
- List of surviving ancient ships
