= Oudenrijn =

Coordinates: 52°05′N 5°04′E

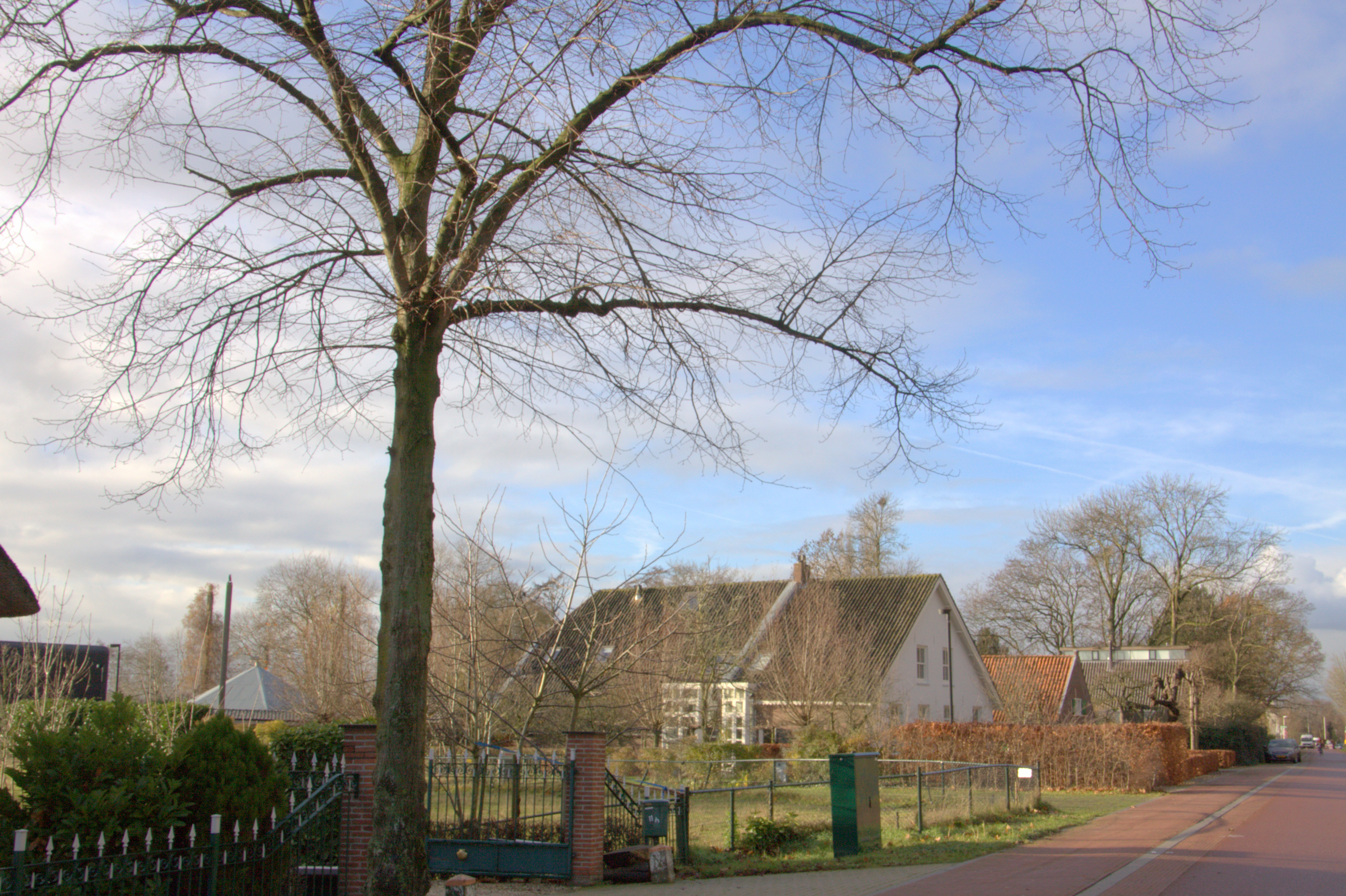

Oudenrijn is a hamlet in the Dutch province of Utrecht. It is located in the municipality of Utrecht, in the western part of the city, surrounded by the new neighbourhoods of Leidsche Rijn.

Oudenrijn was a separate municipality from 1818 to 1954, when it was divided between the municipalities of Utrecht and Vleuten-De Meern.

Oudenrijn is mainly known for its highway interchange.
