= Veldhuizen =

Coordinates: 52°04′58″N 5°00′50″E

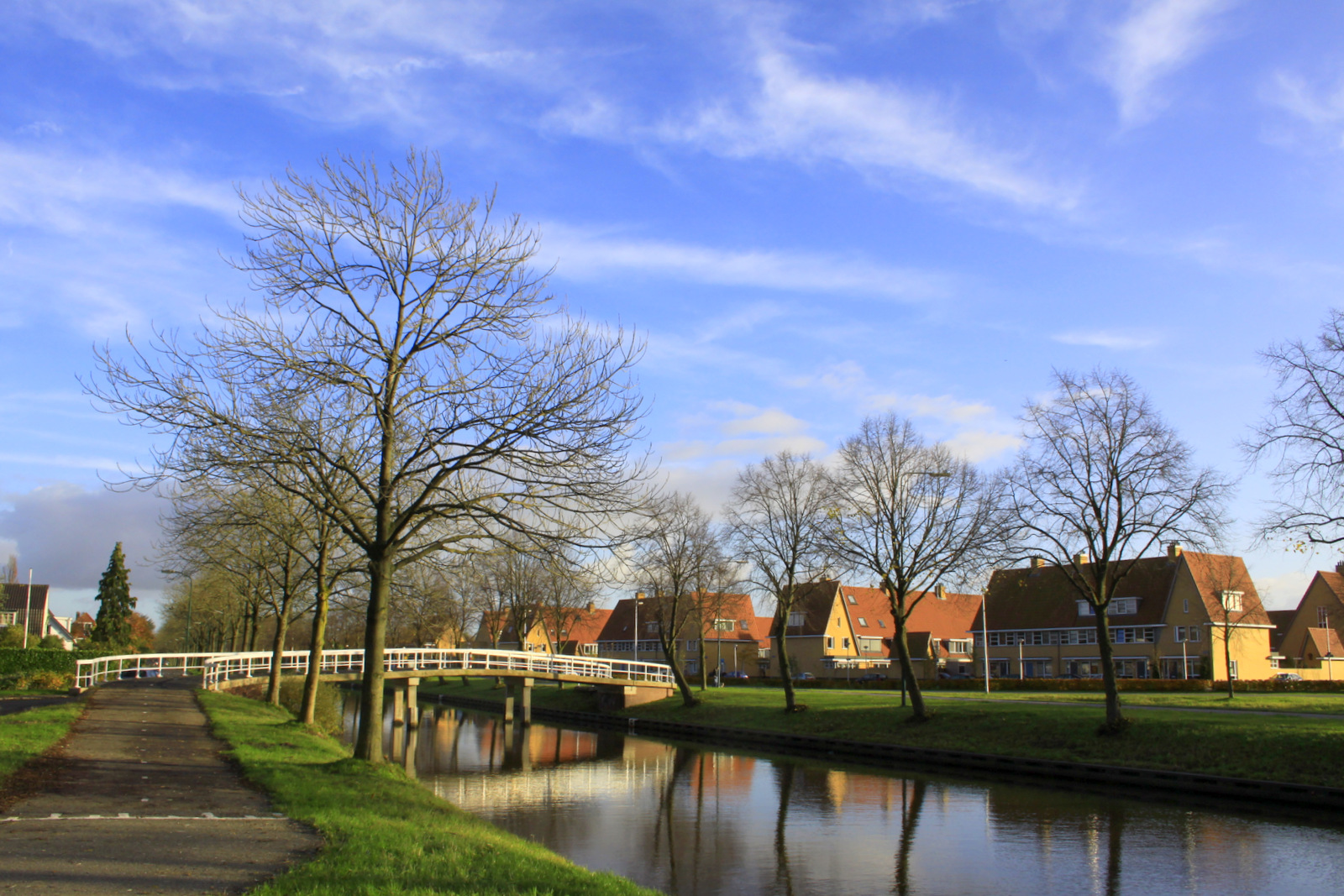
Veldhuizen's new residential area

Veldhuizen is a hamlet in the Dutch province of Utrecht. It is located in the municipality of Utrecht, south of De Meern. It is also the name of a new neighbourhood of Utrecht, built close to the hamlet.

Veldhuizen was a separate municipality between 1818 and 1954, when it became a part of Vleuten-De Meern.
