= Utrecht Post Office =

Former Utrecht main post office, public library

Post Utrecht / Hoofdpostkantoor Utrecht
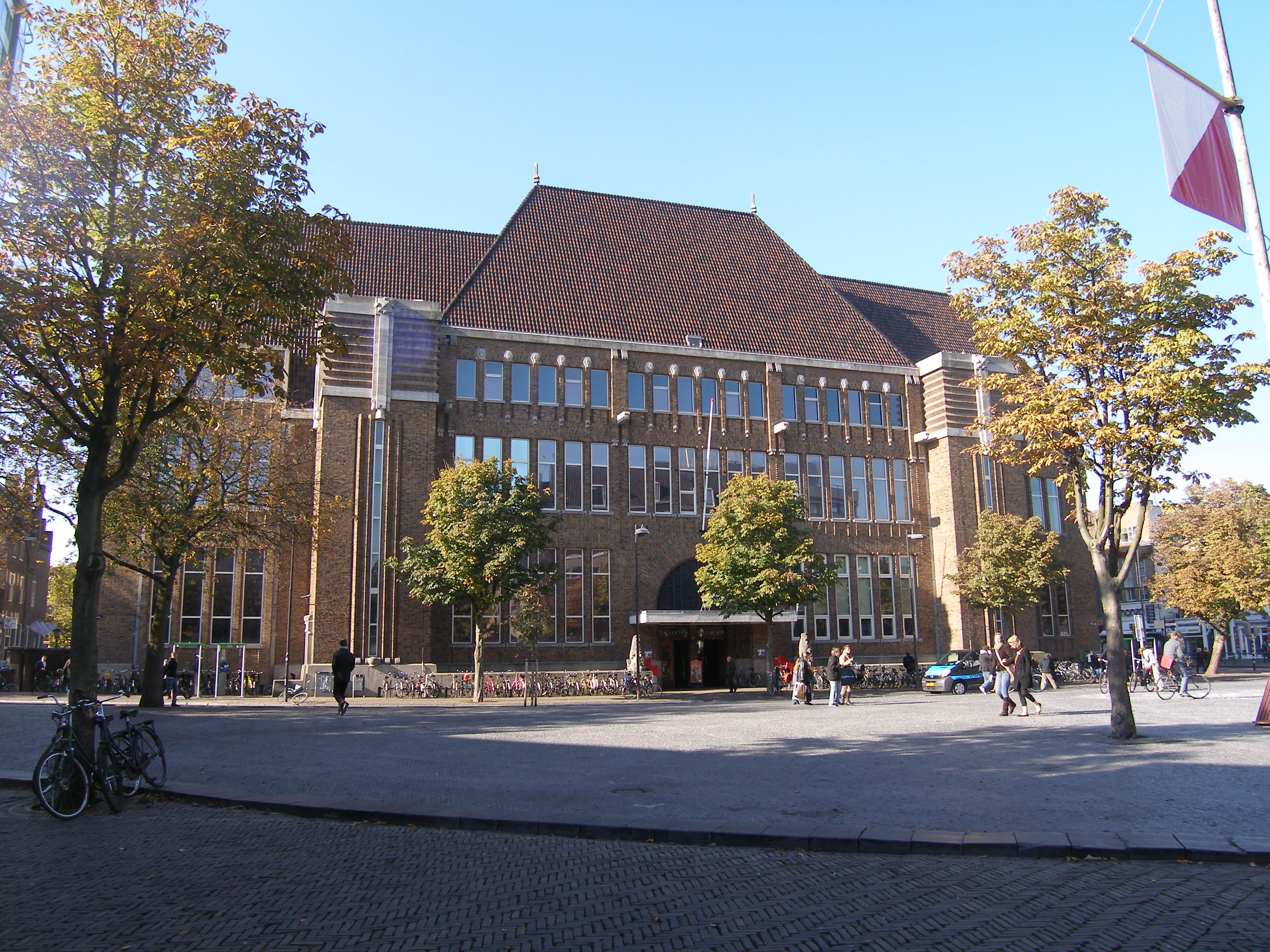
- Public Library and former Main Post Office, Neude, Utrecht, The Netherlands, 2007
- Interactive map of the Post Utrecht / Hoofdpostkantoor Utrecht area

General information
- Architectural style: Amsterdam School
- Location: Neude 11, 3512 AE, Utrecht, The Netherlands
- Coordinates: 52°5′35″N 5°7′4″E
- Construction started: 1919
- Completed: 1924

Design and construction
- Architect: Joseph Crouwel jr. (1885-1962)

Website
- Rijksmonument 514259

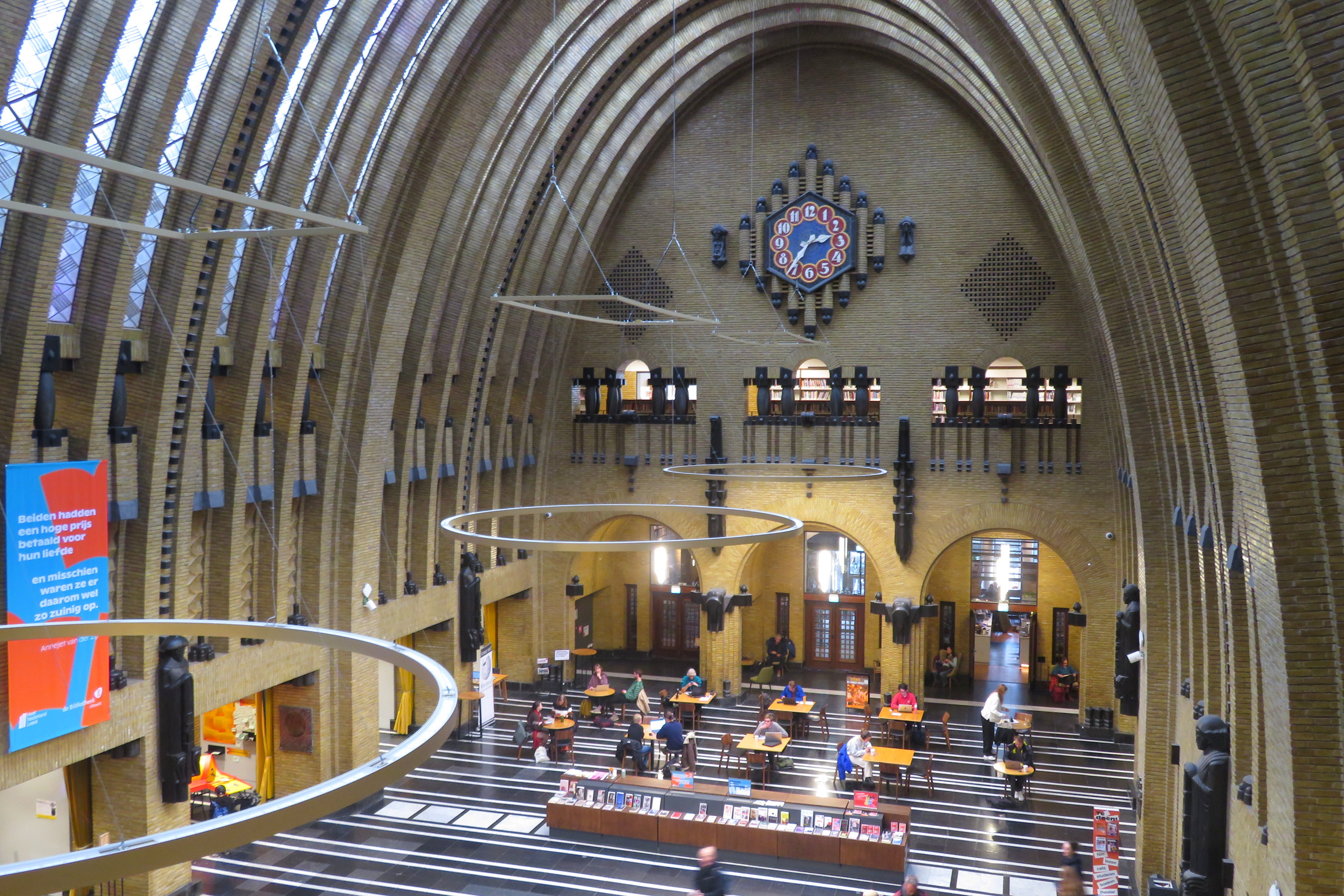
Hall viewed from the first floor, 2023.

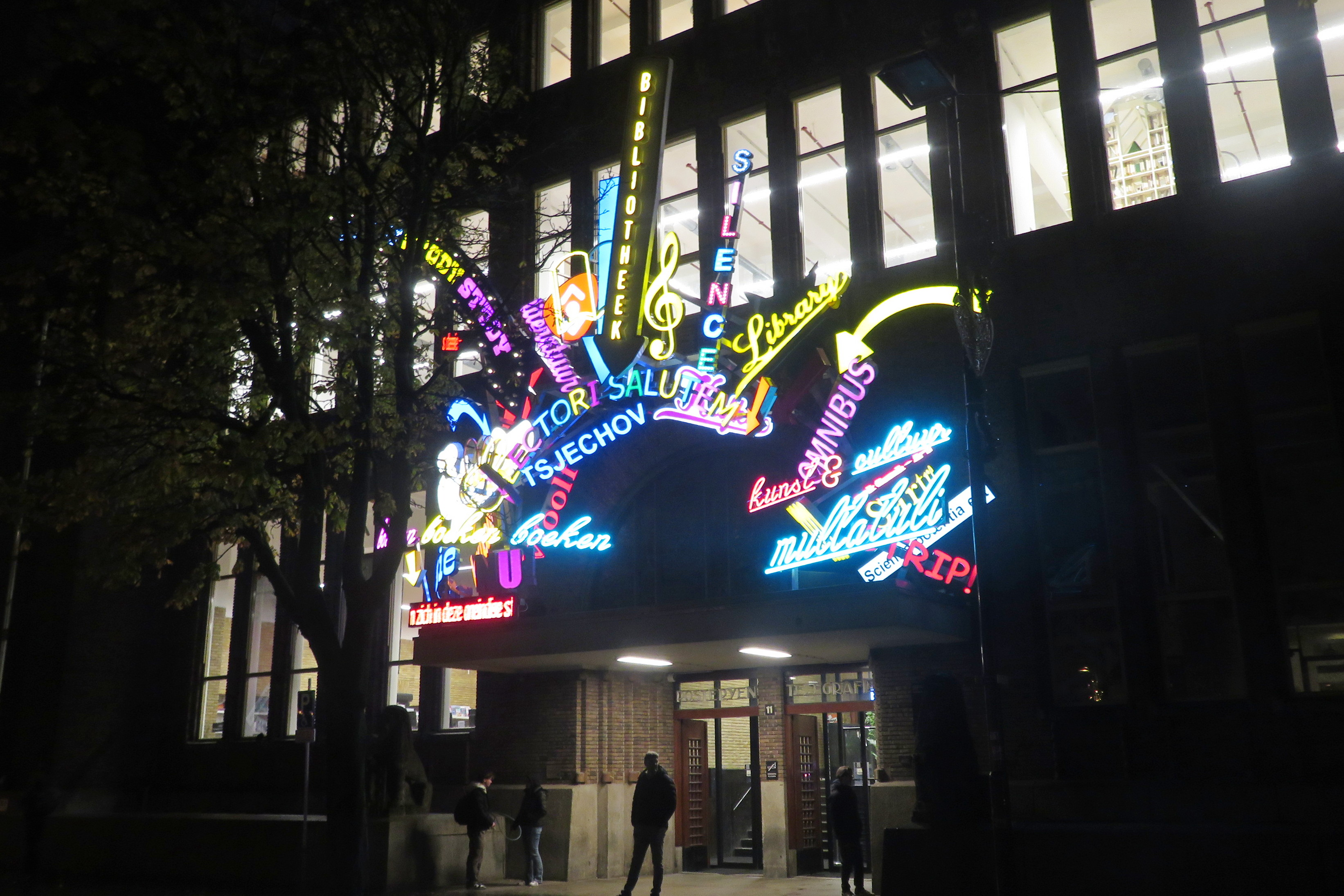
Entrance with neon artwork Intellectual Heritage by Maarten Baas, photo 2023.

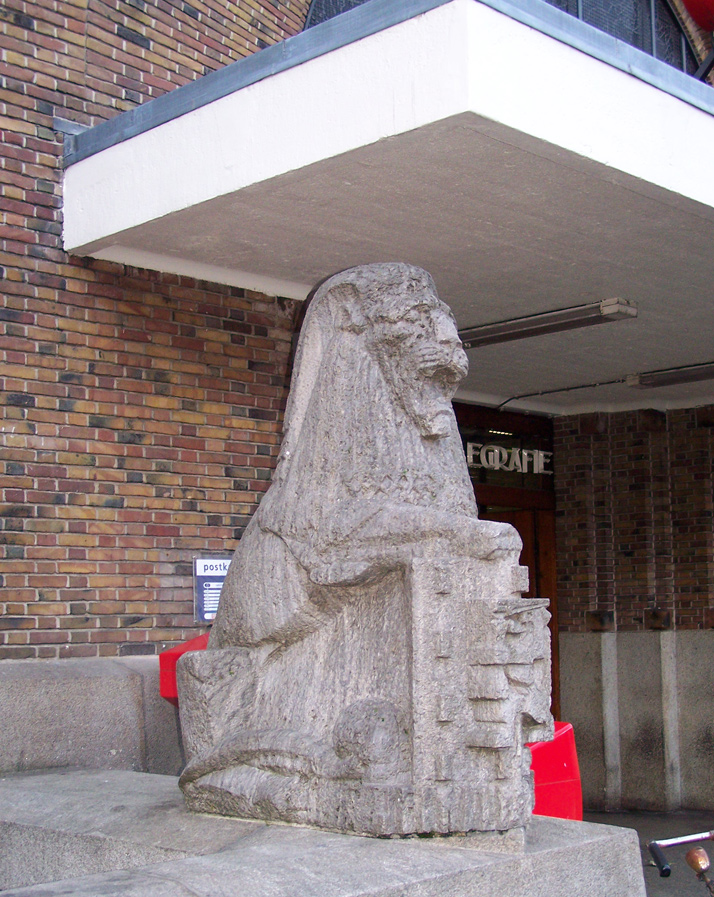
Hendrik van den Eijnde: Lion at the entrance, photo 2006.

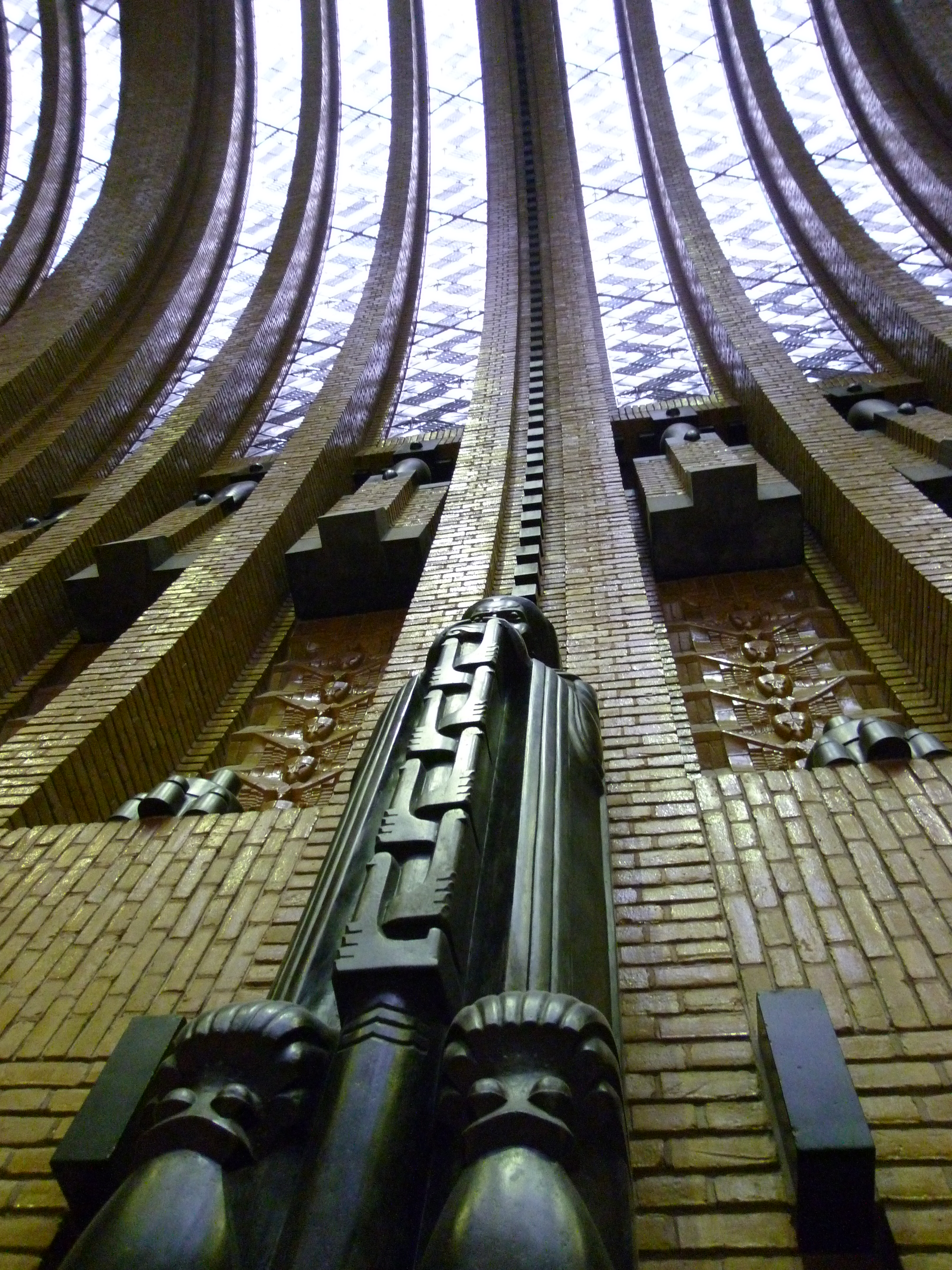
A continent Petit Granit statue with yellow pigeons in the background on high, symbolising the telegraph service. Photo 2011.

The former Utrecht Main Post Office (Dutch: Hoofdpostkantoor Utrecht, Post Neude or Post Utrecht) building completed in 1924, is situated on Neude square, Utrecht, the Netherlands. Since 2020 it has served as the headquarters of the Utrecht Public Library.

== History ==
On the site, a convent dedicated to St. Cecilia was built around 1400 for the nuns of the third order of Francis of Assisi. After the Protestant Reformation the building was possessed by the municipality of Utrecht and continued to exist until 1647. Afterwards, the Dutch National Mint was located here until its move as Royal Dutch Mint to Leidseweg 90, Utrecht, in 1911. In the hall of the former post office a commemorative plaque recalls this predecessor and the issue of the first Dutch stamp here on December 27, 1851. It is a donation by the Utrechtsche Philatelistenvereeniging (Utrecht Philatelist Society) and was designed by Dutch artist Maarten Pauw.

The National Mint building at Neude was demolished and in 1919-1924 the main post office was constructed here, designed by architect Joseph Crouwel jr. (1885–1962).

In the 1970s, the building was renovated under the direction of Dutch architect René van Raalte. In 2008, it was announced that Fortis Vastgoed (now ASR Nederland real estate development) would take over the building from the Dutch telecommunications company KPN. On October 28, 2011, Utrecht Post closed as the very last independent post office in the Netherlands.

For some years the former post office could not be repurposed. Starting in 2016, the building was converted into a multipurpose cultural centre.

Since 2020, the headquarters of the Utrecht public library has resided in the monumental building. This Neude branch of the municipal library was scheduled to open to the public on March 13, 2020, but due to the COVID-19 pandemic, this happened only in phases starting from May 11, 2020. On April 23, 2020, the new shop of Broese Booksellers in the rear of the former post office along the Oudegracht was opened by Utrecht novelist Ronald Giphart.

== Description ==
The former Main Post Office was designed by architect Joseph Crouwel jr. in the style of the Amsterdamse School and was inspired by work of the Finnish architect Eliel Saarinen. Construction began in 1919 and was completed in 1924. The hall of the building is impressive due to the high parabolic supporting arches.

Six large Art Deco black statues made of Belgian Petit Granit decorate the walls of the main entrance hall. Five of these are human figures representing the five continents (Africa, America, Asia, Australia and Europe) with corresponding animals, while a sixth statue symbolises trade and prosperity. The statues and ornaments were made by Hendrik van den Eijnde inspired by ancient Egyptian and Assyrian sculpture. Van den Eijnde also created the pair of white lion statues outside the front entrance at Neude square, which were added later at the request of and paid by Utrecht citizens. They were not part of the initial design. The interior large clock at the north end wall in the large entrance hall was produced by the De Porceleyne Fles company. Richard Roland Holst created the stained glass work above the entrance representing the Dutch Maiden in the garden of the provinces.

In the 1970s, the building was renovated under the direction of Dutch architect René van Raalte. After the closure of the post office here in 2011, it was restructured from 2016 onward into both a large cultural centre and offices for the Utrecht Public Library. The centre includes a library, cinema, auditorium, two cafés and restaurants, exhibition spaces, workplaces for visitors and a large underground bicycle parking lot in the former telephone cable basement. A modern extension to the rear of the building (Oudegracht side) was added in the former courtyard to accommodate a large book shop.

== PTT Telecom ==
The national state telecommunication service PTT Telecom, forerunner of KPN, has been a long-time co-user of this building. The various floors housed offices, telephone exchanges, and an amplifier station where long-distance connections converged. At PTT Telecom, this building was known as UT1. In the 1990s, much of the telephone traffic of the province of Utrecht and the Betuwe was handled via this building through the Ericsson AXE traffic centre UT1F. In addition, there was a 5ESS centre UT1D serving the Culemborg (0345), Tiel (0344) and Woerden (0348) telephone areas. The 5ESS switchboard UT-C1G handled telephone traffic in parts of the city of Utrecht and surrounding towns such as Maarssen and Breukelen (0346).

The cellar underneath the building accommodated the extensive telephone cables connecting Utrecht city.

== Gallery ==
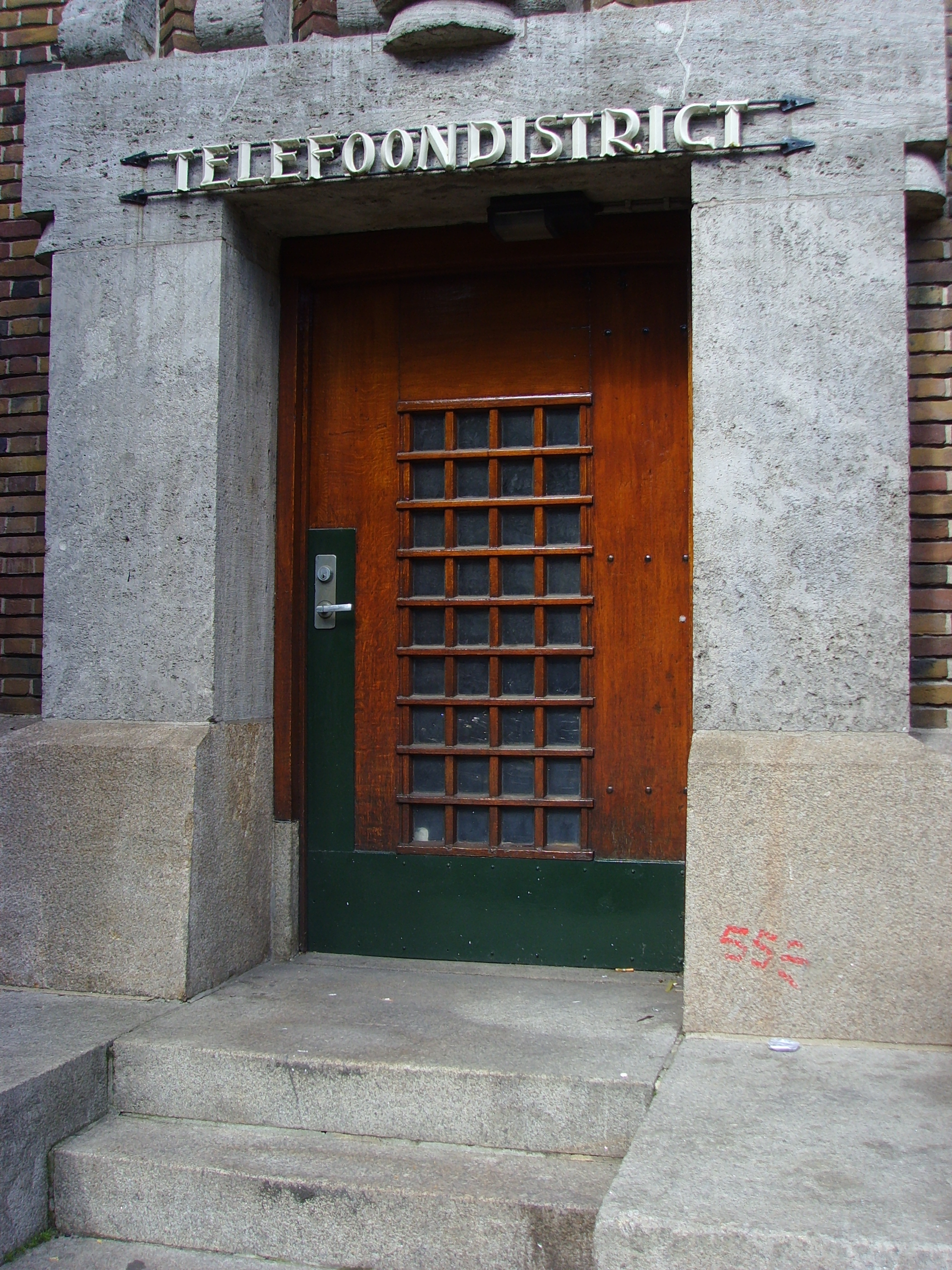
Side door on the south side, Neude square, Utrecht, 2008.

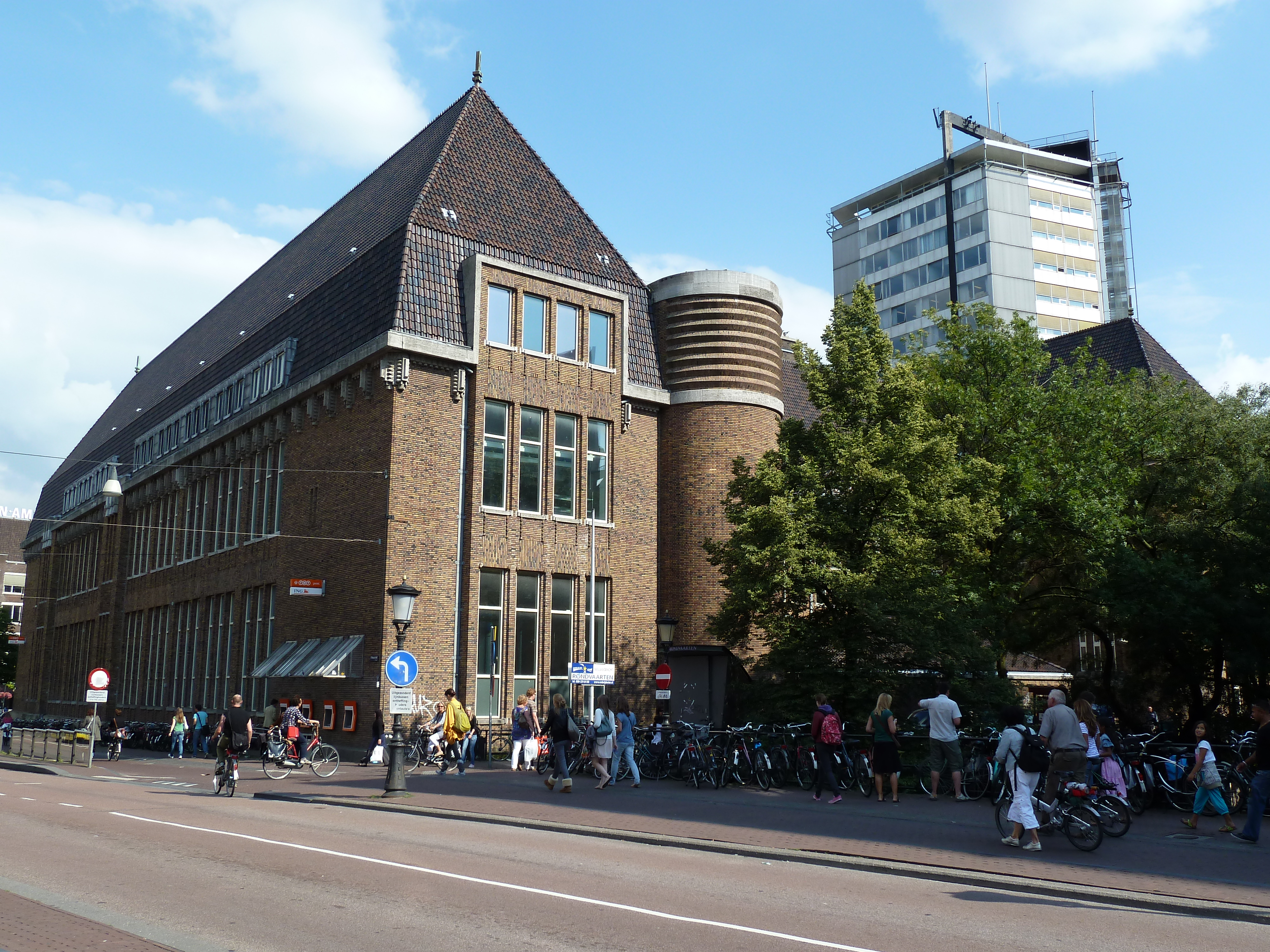
Post office northwest corner at Viestraat along Oudegracht (Old Canal) with the Neudeflat to the right, Utrecht, 2010.

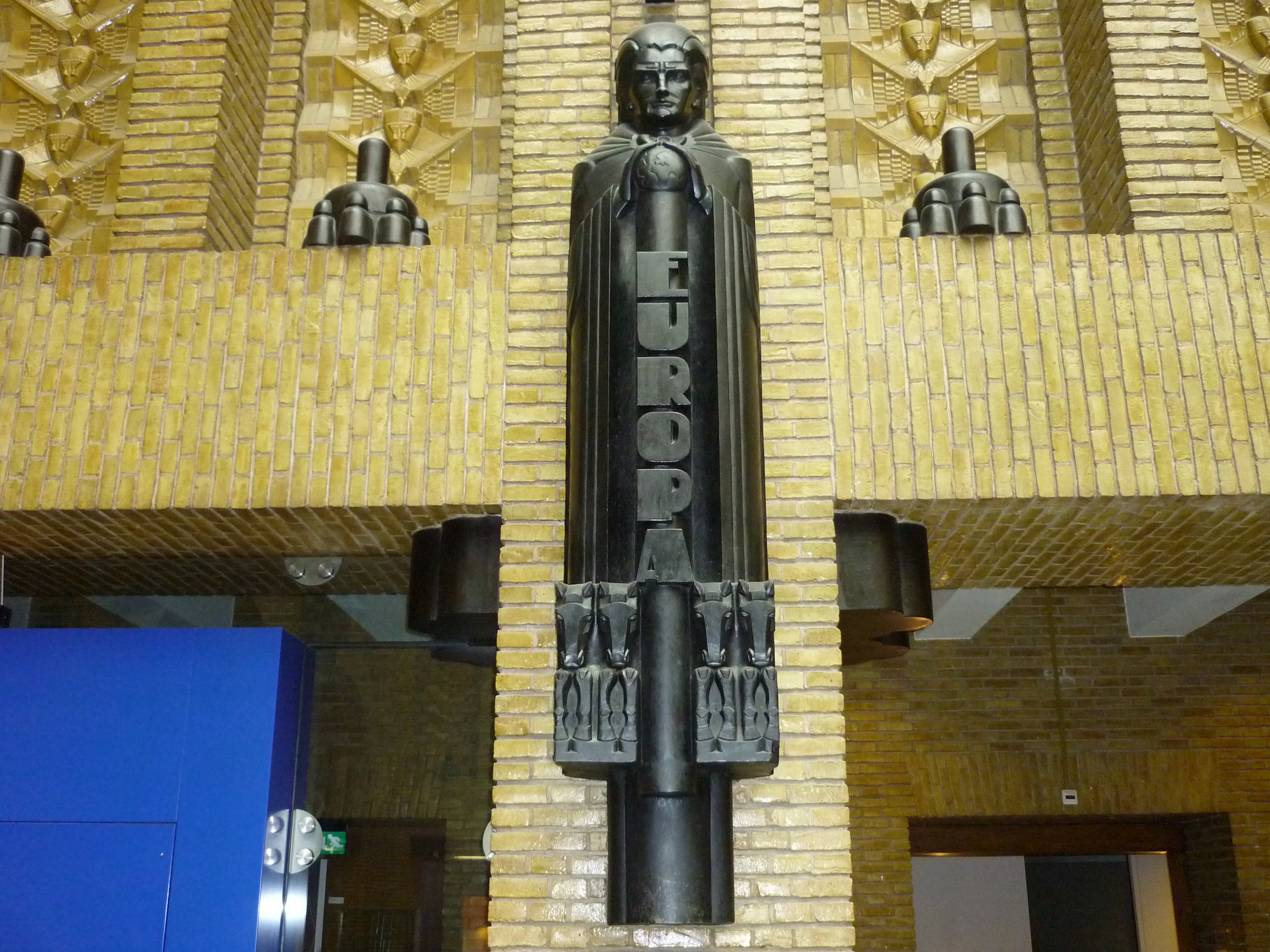
Wall statue in Petit Granit stone representing the continent of Europe. In the background pigeons in yellow brick relief as symbols for the telegraph service, 2011.

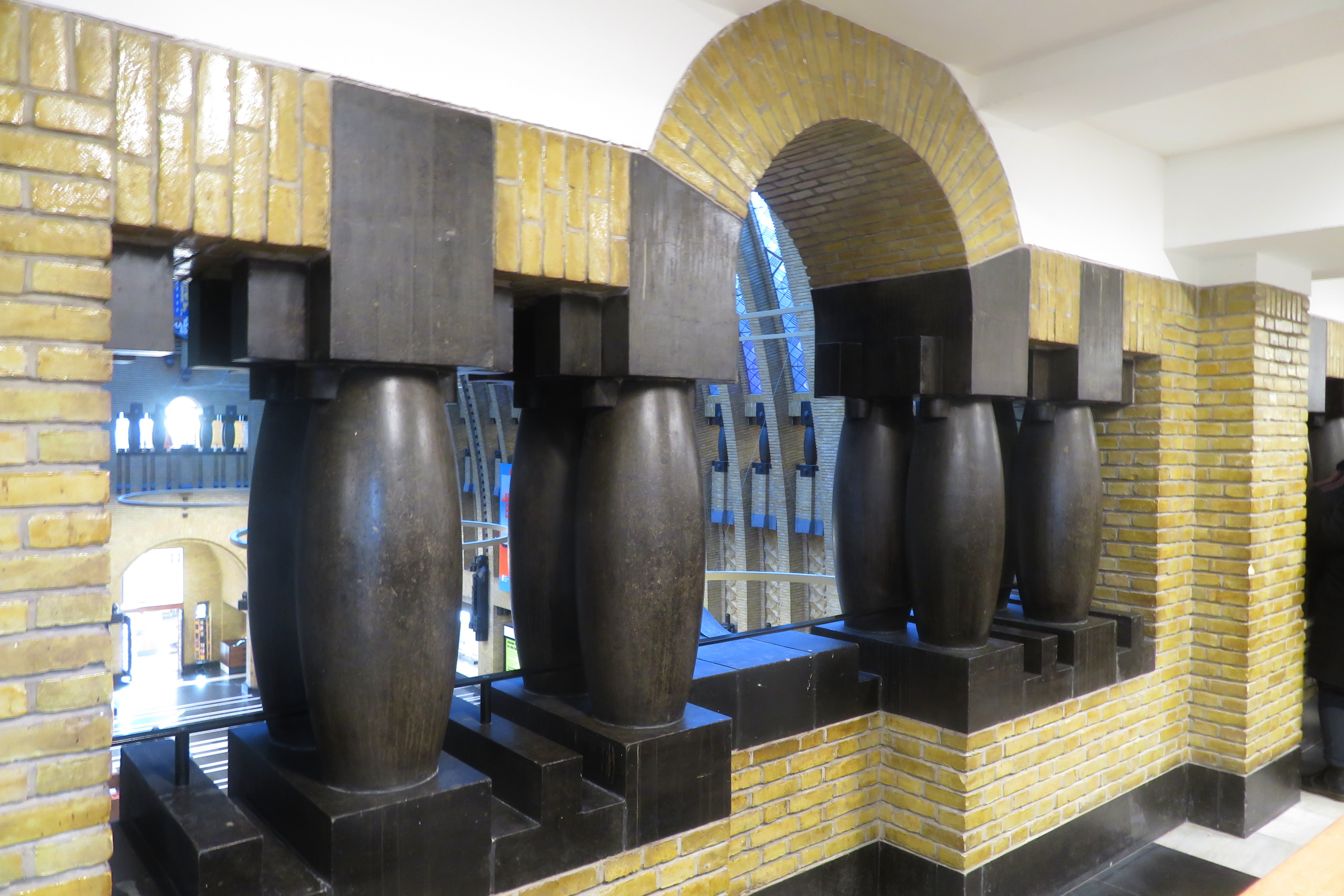
Corridor on an upper floor above the main hall, 2023.

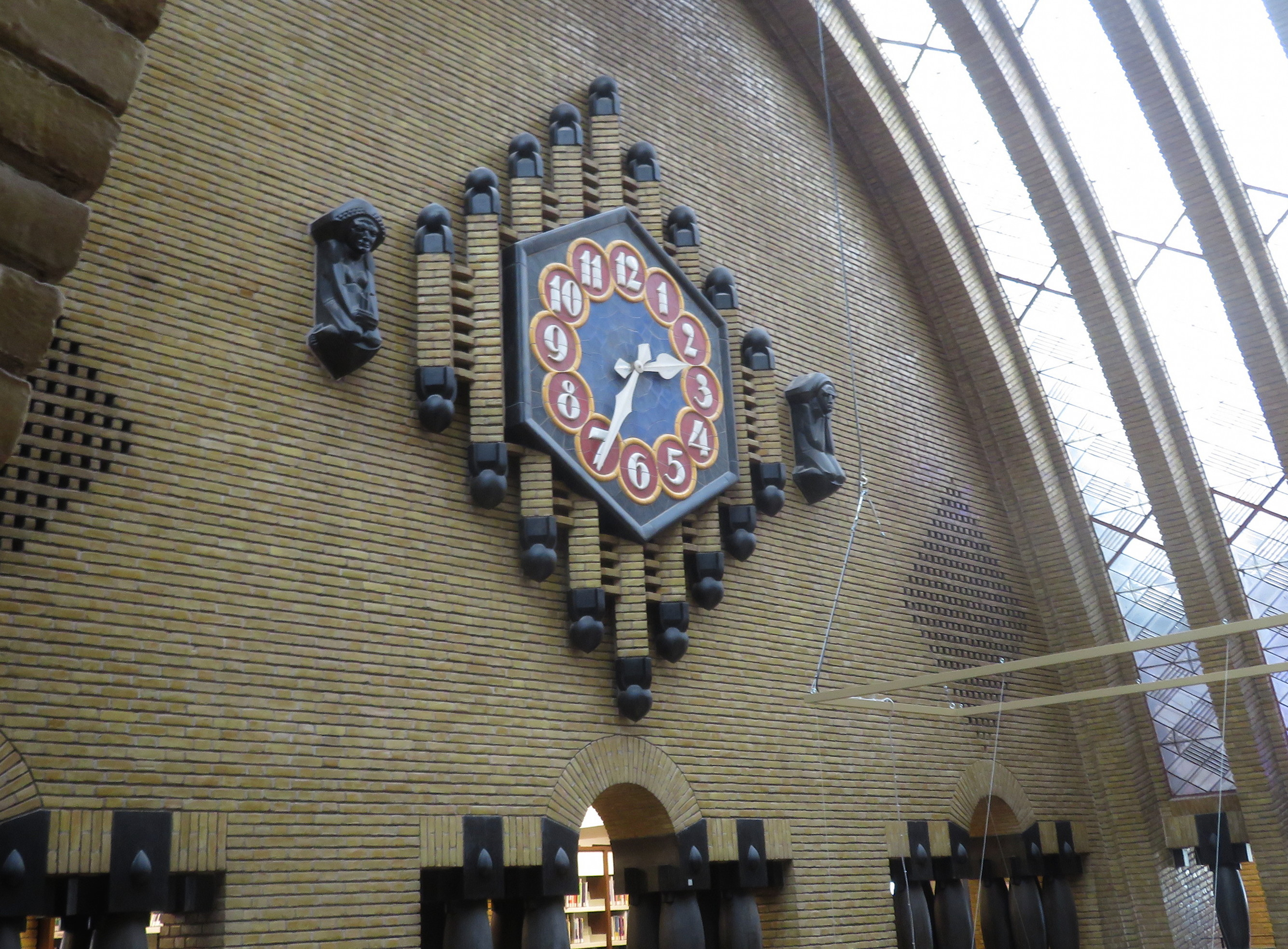
Large hall clock made by De Porceleyne Fles, 2023.

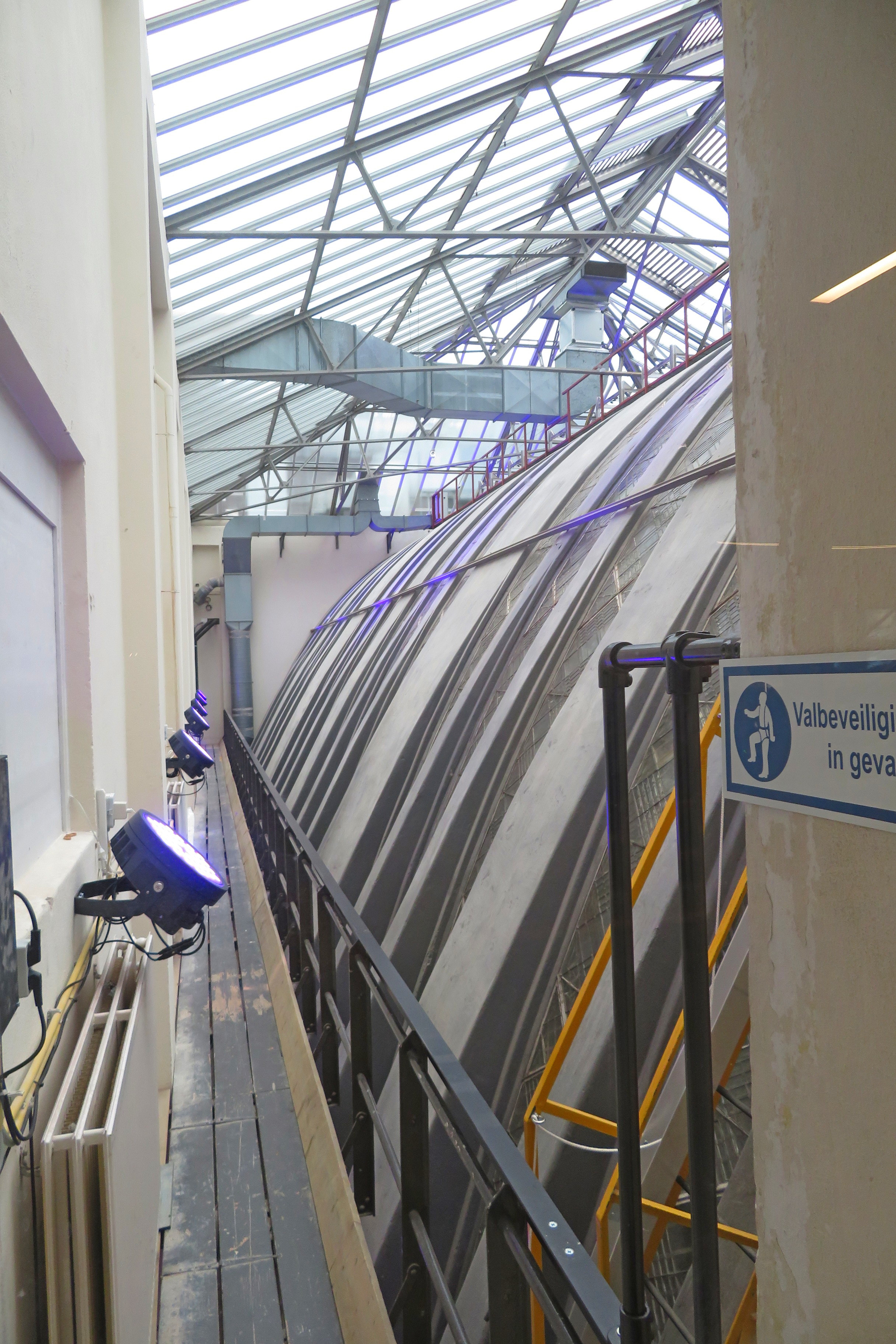
View of the roof construction from the top floor, 2023.

== See also ==
- KPN, successor company to PTT Telecom
- National monument list for Utrecht city (nl)
- Utrecht Public Library

== Literature ==
- van den Berg, Ton; den Boer, Arjan; Goosen, Dick; Stoppelenburg, Nettie; van Vlimmeren, Ton (2020). Neude : Hart van Utrecht. Zwolle: WBOOKS. ISBN 978-94-625-8382-5. OCLC 1149926235.
- 't Hart, P.D. (1992). Een machtig middel tot volksontwikkeling : honderd jaar openbare bibliotheken in de stad Utrecht 1892-1992 (in Dutch). Zwolle: Catena. ISBN 9789072211415. OCLC 65588225.
- Heidemann, Willeke (2023). Rondleiders Alfabet, versie 2023 (in Dutch). Utrecht: Bibliotheek Utrecht, internal publication.
- de Keizer, Harry (2007). Historische Muurreclames Utrecht (in Dutch). Gemeente Utrecht, Werkgroep Directe Voorzieningen. OCLC 212427413.
- Meyer, G.A.E.B.; (Kluit-)de Clercq), A.E. (1917). De Openbare Leeszaal te Utrecht 1892-1917 (in Dutch). Utrecht: [Den Boer]. OCLC 64114968.

Media related to Hoofdpostkantoor, Utrecht at Wikimedia Commons
