= Leidsche Rijn =

- Neighborhood in Utrecht
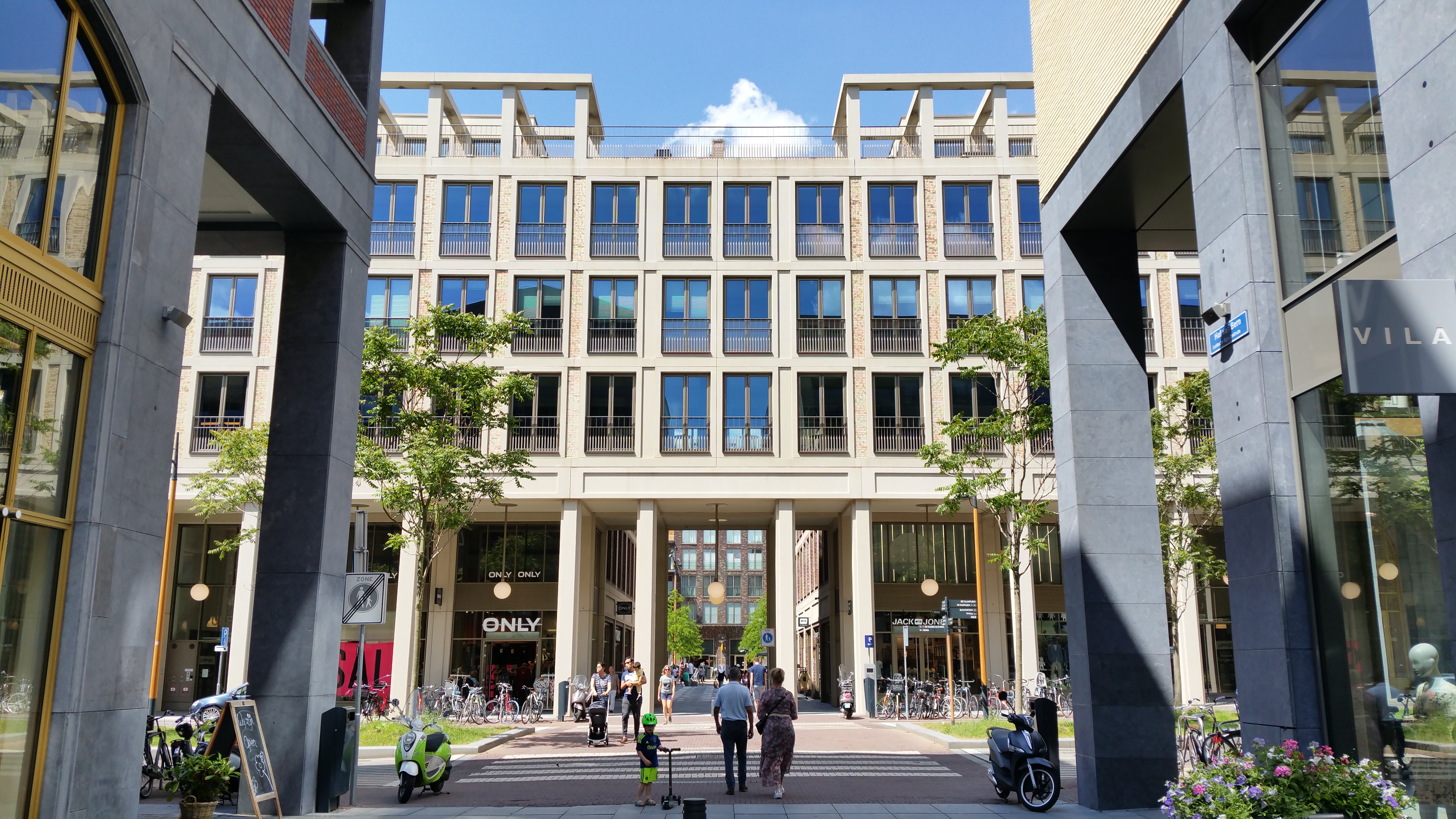
- Leidsche Rijn Centrum, the shopping centre of Leidsche Rijn

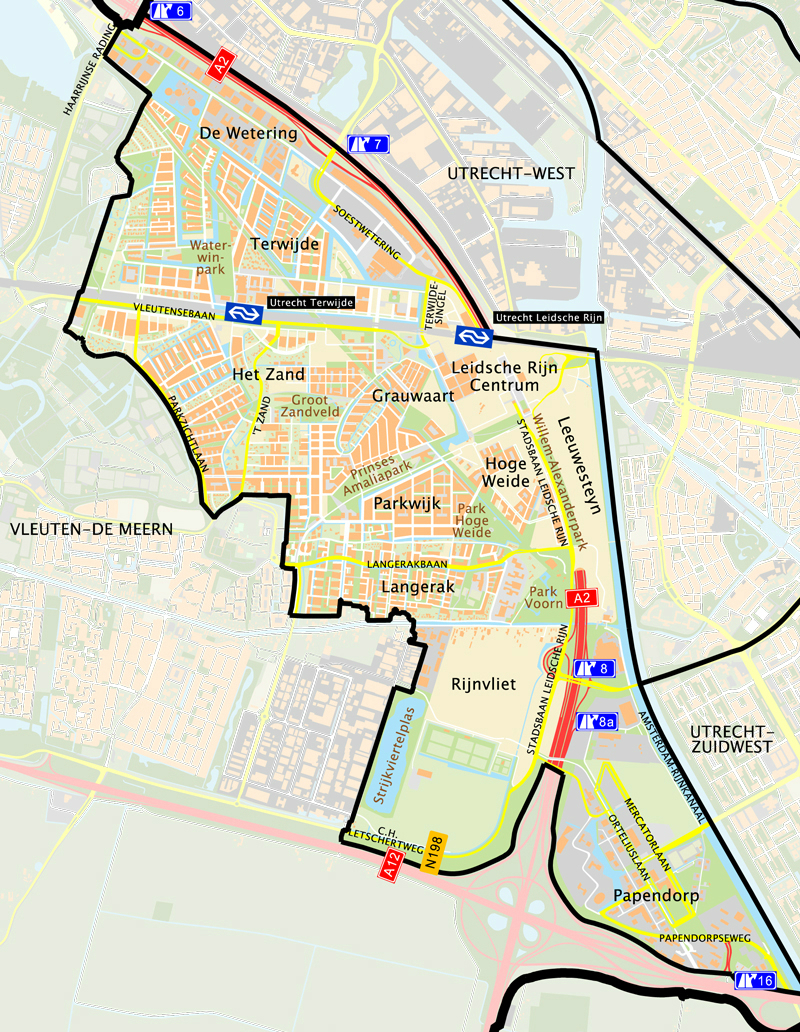
- Coordinates: 52.097094°N 5.064638°E

Population (2022)
  - Total: 95,000
- Time zone: UTC+1 (CET)
  - Summer (DST): UTC+2 (CEST)
- Postcodes: 3454-3545

Leidsche Rijn (Dutch pronunciation: [ˈlɛitsə ˈrɛin], Utrecht dialect: [ˈlaitsə ˈʁain]) is a new construction site and neighborhood in Utrecht, the capital of the Dutch province of Utrecht. The area is located west of the Amsterdam–Rhine Canal and its name is derived from the Leidse Rijn canal, which runs through it. At the time of its inception in the 1990s and in the decades that followed, Leidsche Rijn was the largest Vinex location in the Netherlands. Most of this location was on the territory of the former municipality of Vleuten-De Meern, located west of the city of Utrecht. A smaller part of this location, namely the area of Hoge and Lage Weide, was located in the municipality of Utrecht.

Vleuten-De Meern was added to the municipality of Utrecht on 1 January 2001. The intended size of the Vinex location was about 30,000 houses for about 90,000 inhabitants. The Utrecht City Council decided to divide it into two districts, namely the Vleuten-De Meern district and the Leidsche Rijn district. Despite this division, the aforementioned neighborhoods are the largest in the municipality of Utrecht in terms of population with approximately 50,000 and 45,000 inhabitants, respectively.

== Construction ==
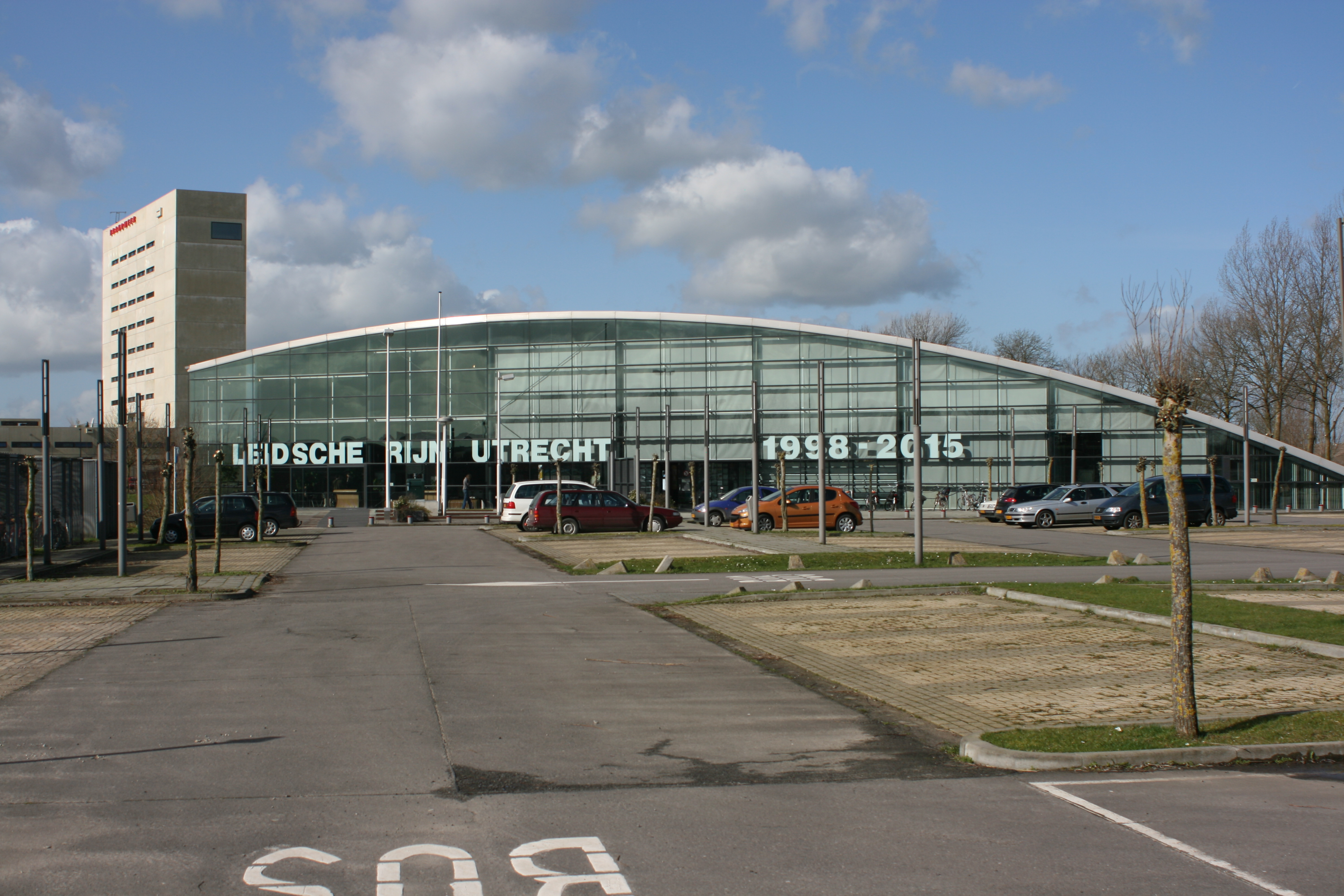
The former Leidsche Rijn information centre on the Vleutenseweg

The area, including the Rijnenburg polder area, is about 25 km^{2}. Originally, 30,000 houses for about 90,000 inhabitants were planned. This included the approximately 6,000 existing homes in the villages of De Meern, Vleuten, and Haarzuilens. By the end of 2019, the target number of 90,000 inhabitants was passed. On 1 January 2022 the two districts together numbered over 95,000 residents, of whom about 45,000 lived in the Leidsche Rijn district. The biggest milestones in the development of Leidsche Rijn were, successively,

- the first pile driven on 4 December 1997 by then Prime Minister Wim Kok;
- the completion of the first homes with the first handover of keys on 14 October 1998;
- the official start of the major infrastructure works for Leidsche Rijn, including the relocation, widening and covering of the A2 motorway and the raising and doubling of the Utrecht-Woerden railroad line (to four tracks) on 12 April 2005 by then Minister of Transport, Public Works and Water Management Karla Peijs.

After the relocation and covering of the A2 highway, the official go-ahead could be given for the construction of the Leidsche Rijn Centrum neighborhood on 20 June 2014, whose shopping center was opened on 16 May 2018 by the mayor, Jan van Zanen.

Smaller milestones (which are more contained in Leidsche Rijn itself) included:

- the commissioning in 2011 of the Máximapark;
- its official opening in 2013;
- the commissioning of other shopping centers such as the Vleuterweide shopping center in the neighboring Vleuten-De Meern district in 2010 and the Terwijde shopping center in the subdistrict of the same name in 2014.

The oldest sub-locations within the area are Veldhuizen and Langerak. Construction activities there began in 1997. Veldhuizen then still belonged to the municipality of Vleuten-De Meern. When this municipality joined Utrecht in 2001, most of the 3,000 new homes in Veldhuizen were already occupied. The largest sub-location of the area is Vleuterweide; it has over 18,000 inhabitants. Because of this size, Vleuterweide is divided into three neighborhoods. Other large sub-locations are Terwijde and Het Zand. By 2020, about 90% of the Leidsche Rijn project was complete. New construction activities of any size will still take place in Leidsche Rijn Centrum and north of Vleuten.

During construction, several archeological remains were discovered. In 1997 and in 2003 Roman ships were discovered in the neighbourhood of De Balije. In 2002 and 2003 Roman watchtowers were discovered in the neighbourhoods of Vleuterweide and Het Zand.

== Transportation ==
=== Roads ===
Within the Leidsche Rijn district, the A2 / Ring Utrecht West was widened and set up as a parallel lane system with a main lane (three lanes in each direction) and a parallel lane (two lanes in each direction). In the Leidsche Rijntunnel, a so-called land tunnel, the freeway was covered. In connection with this, the slip roads at Lage Weide were relocated. This work near Utrecht coincided with a national project to widen and improve the A2 motorway.

The A12 west of the Oudenrijn interchange just outside the district was also widened. The section between this interchange and De Meern received six lanes and in the opposite direction five lanes. Between De Meern and Gouda, the A12 was widened to four lanes in both directions. In addition, new slip roads with access roads were constructed near Harmelen for the benefit of Harmelen itself and the western parts of Vleuten-De Meern and Leidsche Rijn. Again, this work coincided with a national expansion project to improve the A12.

A northern and southern city axis were constructed for vehicular traffic. Between the large shopping center of Leidsche Rijn and the Berlin Square is the Stadsbaantunnel. This was built against the Leidsche Rhine tunnel.

=== Rail connections ===
In October 2018, the doubling of the number of tracks from two to four in the railroad between Utrecht and Woerden was completed. This was part of the project and concept of Randstadspoor, which aims to provide good access to the Utrecht region and, among others, the Vinex locations in this region. Vleuten station was relocated and two new stations were added: Utrecht Terwijde and Utrecht Leidsche Rijn. In Leidsche Rijn and Vleuten the track was raised and provided with spacious underpasses. For the purpose of this doubling, a second railroad bridge over the Amsterdam-Rijnkanaal was installed in late 2017 alongside the already existing railroad bridge.

The area of the districts Leidsche Rijn and Vleuten-De Meern, has two largely free bus lanes. City and regional buses run over these with high frequency and, in accordance with the concept of high-quality public transport, provide smooth connections between the old and new city districts of Utrecht. Several bridges and viaducts in Leidsche Rijn have been built with separate lanes for buses.

== Education ==
Leidsche Rijn has several primary and secondary schools, such as the Leidsche Rijn College or Academie Tien.
