= De Meern =

- Neighbourhood of Utrecht
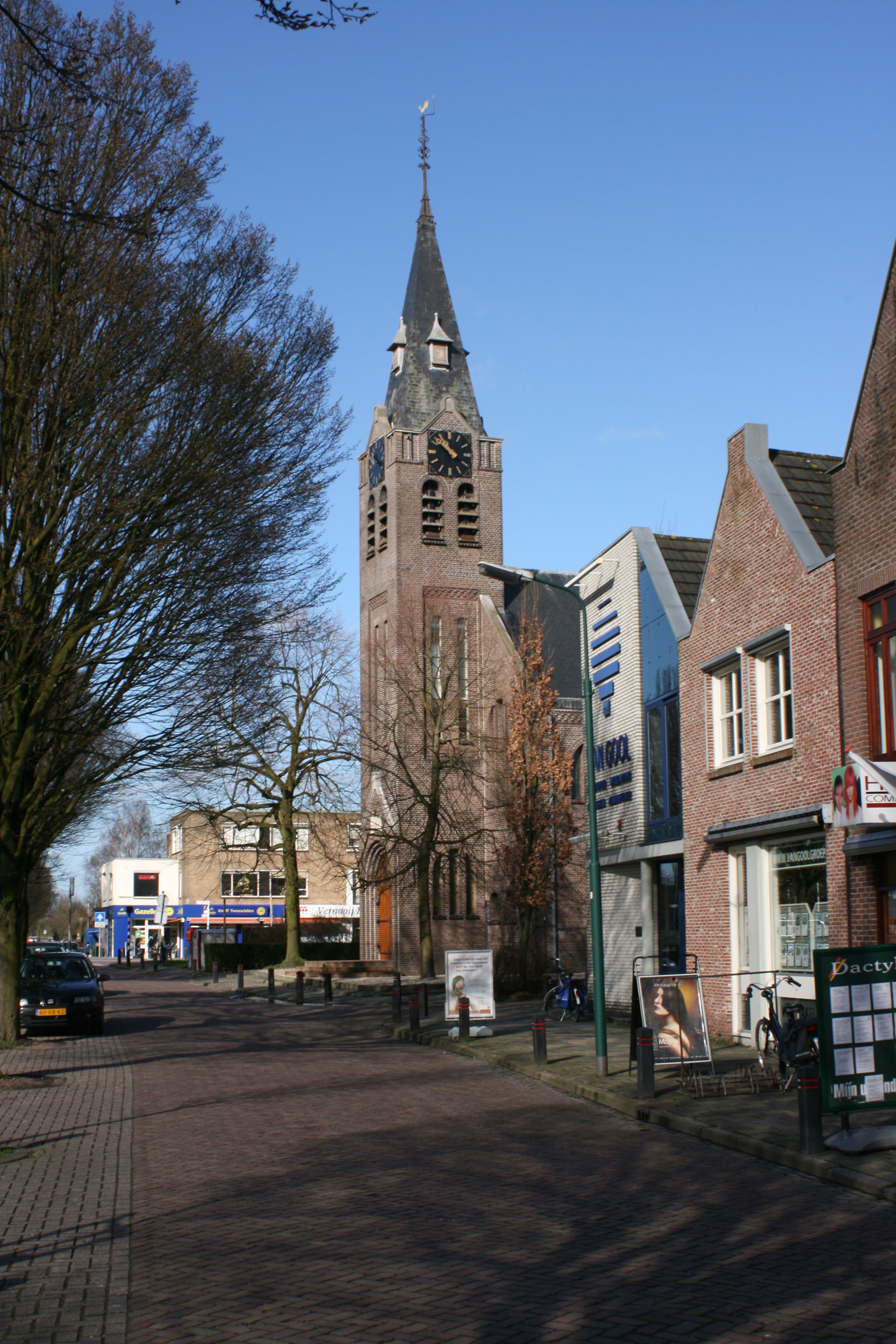
- "Marekerk", Protestant Church built in 1913

- De Meern in the municipality of Utrecht.
- Coordinates: 52°4′41″N 5°1′41″E
- Country: Netherlands
- Province: Utrecht
- Municipality: Utrecht
- Elevation: +2 m (6.6 ft)
- Highest elevation: +4 m (13 ft)
- Lowest elevation: −1 m (−3.3 ft)

Population (01-01-2020)
  - Total: 21,764
- Time zone: UTC+1 (CET)
  - Summer (DST): UTC+2 (CEST)
- Postal code: 3453,3454
- Dialing code: 030
- Website: www.utrecht.nl

De Meern (Dutch pronunciation: [də ˈmeːr(ə)n]) is an urbanized village in the Dutch province of Utrecht. It is a part of the municipality of Utrecht, and is located 6 km west of the inner city of this town.

Before 2001, the villages De Meern, Vleuten, and Haarzuilens formed a municipality called Vleuten-De Meern. On 1 January 2001, it was incorporated in the municipality of Utrecht.

The population of De Meern has increased from about 11,000 in 1999 to almost 22,000 in 2020.

== History ==
De Meern lies in the region of a disappeared branch of the river Rhine. This river branch served as the northern border of the Roman Empire. On the river bank the Roman army built a walled camp, a so-called castellum. This happened in the first century after Christ. Also in other places in the Netherlands castella were built. The castellum in De Meern is unique within the Netherlands because of the Museum Hoge Woerd with numerous archeological objects found in the soil of De Meern. This museum is housed in a rebuilt version of the castellum on the same site as the former real castellum.

Within the museum a complete Roman ship can be viewed. This ship was excavated in 1997 when a new residential area in De Meern was prepared. It was found underground, at the bottom of the former river Rhine. After a many years lasting preservation process to prevent oxidation the ship was moved to the new built Museum Hoge Woerd.

In De Meern many objects from the Roman times and the Middle Ages are found, among which several ships, roads, pottery and currency. Most of these items (especially the big ones) have been put back into the ground for perfect preservation, since the riverclay prevents them from rotting. (It hardly lets oxygen through). Nevertheless, many objects found in the soil of De Meern can be viewed in the local Museum Hoge Woerd.

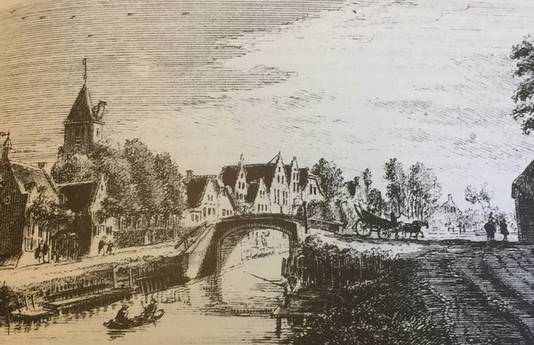
The village of De Meern and the Meernbrug in the 18th century

A village 'De Meern' did not yet exist in the Roman times. In the 11th century there came farmers to the new 'polders' on the west of Utrecht. Round the year 1200 a dike called Meern was built. A bridge called Pons Maerne, in Dutch language: Meernbrug, was mentioned in a document from the year 1301. This bridge gave access to the dike Meern. Near the Meernbrug a chapel was founded. In the 15th century the village De Meern arose around this chapel, which in the 17th century was enlarged to a little church. In 1912 this building was broken off, and replaced by a church in Art Nouveau style. The present name of this church is Marekerk. (See photo)

Nowadays, De Meern is part of the agglomeration of Utrecht. In 2020 the municipality of Utrecht has almost 360,000 inhabitants. The urban region surrounding and including the city of Utrecht has in 2020 about 675,000 inhabitants.
