= Vleuten-De Meern =

Former municipality of Utrecht, Netherlands

Coordinates: 52°5′45″N 5°1′15″E

Vleuten-De Meern is a former municipality in the Dutch province of Utrecht. It was created in a merger of Haarzuilens, Veldhuizen, Vleuten and a part of Oudenrijn in 1954, and existed until 2001, when it was merged with Utrecht to become a city part of it.
