= Vleuten =

Neighbourhood of Utrecht, Netherlands

- Neighbourhood
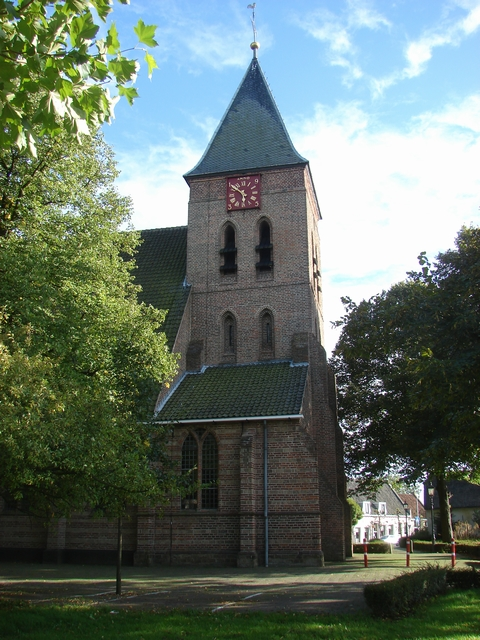
- Torenpleinkerk te Vleuten

- The town centre (dark green) and the statistical district (light green) of Vleuten in the municipality of Utrecht.
- Coordinates: 52°6′29″N 5°0′54″E
- Country: Netherlands
- Province: Utrecht
- Municipality: Utrecht

Population (2013)
  - Total: 6,915
- Time zone: UTC+1 (CET)
  - Summer (DST): UTC+2 (CEST)

Vleuten is a former village in the Dutch province of Utrecht. Today, it is a neighbourhood of the city of Utrecht, and lies about 6 km west of the city centre. Vleuten has a railway station on the line between Utrecht and Woerden.

In 2001, Vleuten had 7,434 inhabitants. The built-up area was 1.4 km^{2}, and contained 2,979 residences. The statistical area "Vleuten" has a population of around 7,090.

== History ==
Vleuten used to be a separate municipality, until it merged with a number of other municipalities in 1954 to form Vleuten-De Meern. In 2001, that municipality merged with the municipality of Utrecht to become a city part of it.

== Notable people ==
- Lotte Keukelaar (born 2005), footballer for the Netherlands national team
