= Joseph Mulder =

Dutch printmaker

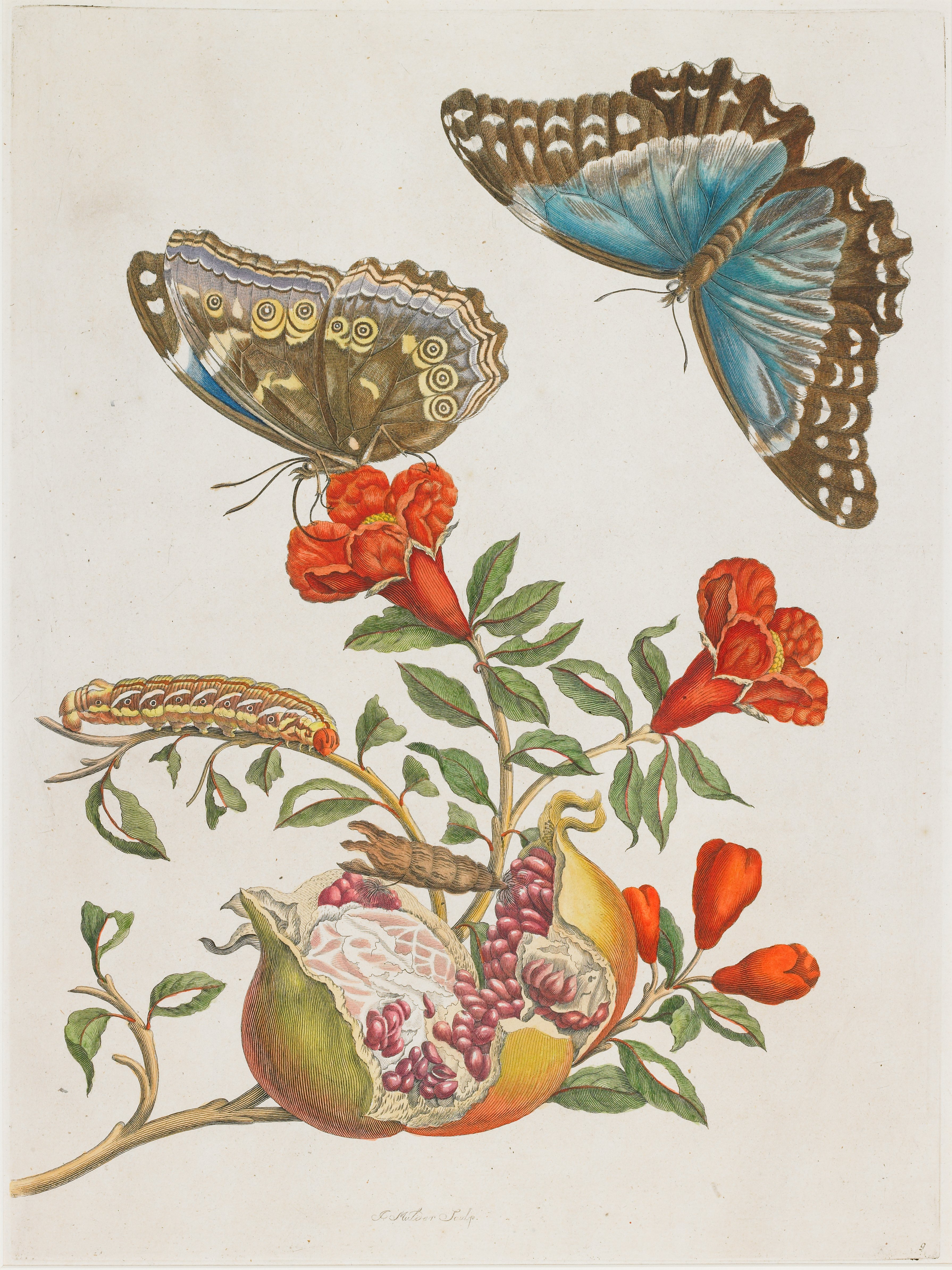
An etching by Joseph Mulder called "Blue Butterflies and Pomegranate" from Insects of Surinam.

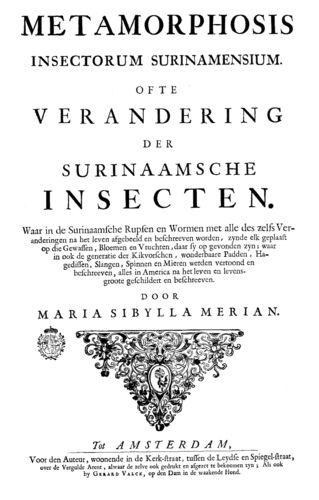
The cover page of Insects of Surinam by Maria Sibylla Merian, with etchings by Joseph Mulder

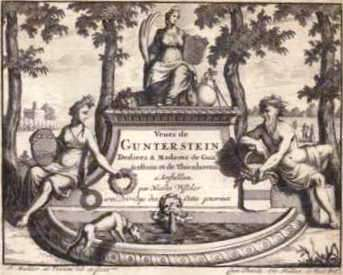
Titlepage by Mulder of "Veues de Gunterstein"

Joseph Mulder (1658, Amsterdam – 1742, Amsterdam), was a Dutch Golden Age printmaker, known as a "renowned engraver".

An engraving by Mulder illustrates the title page of the 1700 edition, published in Leiden, of Dialogue Concerning the Two Chief World Systems by Galileo. This engraving shows Aristotle, Ptolemy and Copernicus. Mulder worked abroad as well, and produced an engraving of Vienna from a bird's-eye view, in nine prints each measuring one by two feet.

Along with Pieter Sluyter, he did many of the etchings for the classic book Insects of Surinam (Metamorphosis Insectorum Surinamensium) based on field drawings done by Maria Sibylla Merian. This book, published in 1726, has been described as "magnificent" and included early scientific study of the metamorphosis of caterpillars into butterflies.

The book Figures de la Bible a La Haye, published in 1728 in The Hague, has an etching by Mulder portraying Adam and Eve as "happy, childlike lovers" with Genesis 2:25 inscribed in six languages: German, Dutch, Hebrew, Latin, English and French. The English translation is "Adam and Eve were both naked and were not ashamed."

Mulder's etchings are actively collected today.

According to his contemporary, art historian Arnold Houbraken, he was a good etcher who had been the pupil of the Amsterdam painter Hendrick Bogaert in 1672. Houbraken reported that Mulder claimed to have played a similar prank on a baby as Adriaen Brouwer had done. In this anecdote, he had been rocking a baby on his lap. The baby soiled him because its diaper slipped off. He laid the baby on the floor and defecated on it. At that moment, the baby's mother walked in and asked what he was doing. He replied, "het kind heeft my bescheeten, en ik beschyt het weer, dus beschyten wy malkander" (the child shat on me, and now I shat on it, and so we're shitting on each other).

According to the Netherlands Institute for Art History, he was an engraver and printmaker who had been a pupil of Bogaert and also followed Romeyn de Hooghe.

He made the engravings for the book Veues de Gunterstein for the rich widow Madame de Gunterstein et de Thienhoven (Magdalena Poulle) ca. 1690.
