= Gunterstein Castle =

Dutch summer home on the Vecht

- Gunterstein
- Breukelen, the Netherlands
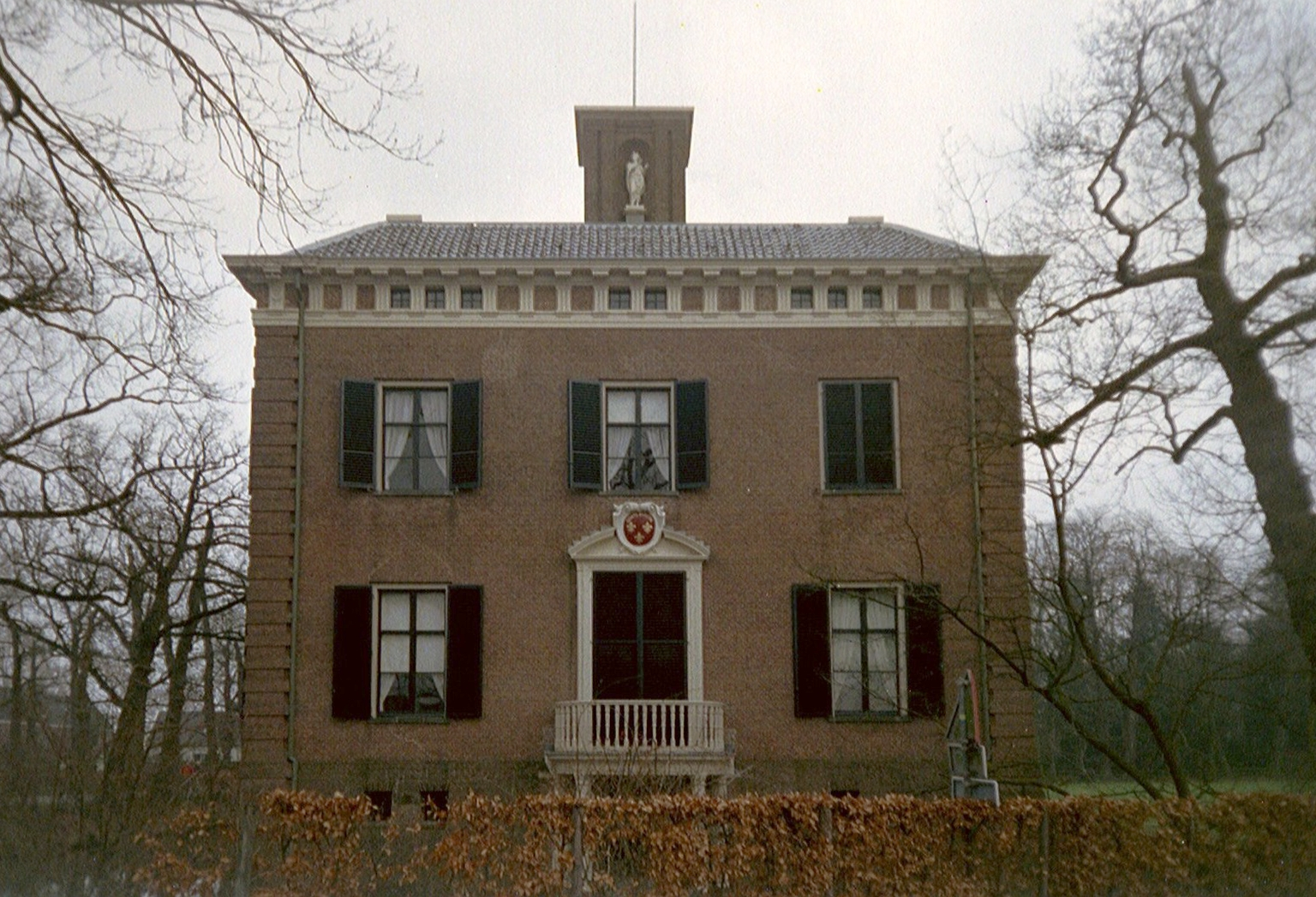
- Gunterstein Castle in 2004

Site information
- Type: Castle
- Open to the public: Yes

Location
- The Netherlands
- Coordinates: 52°10′20″N 5°0′21″E

Site history
- Built: 1681
- Built by: Adriaan Dortsman
- Materials: Brick

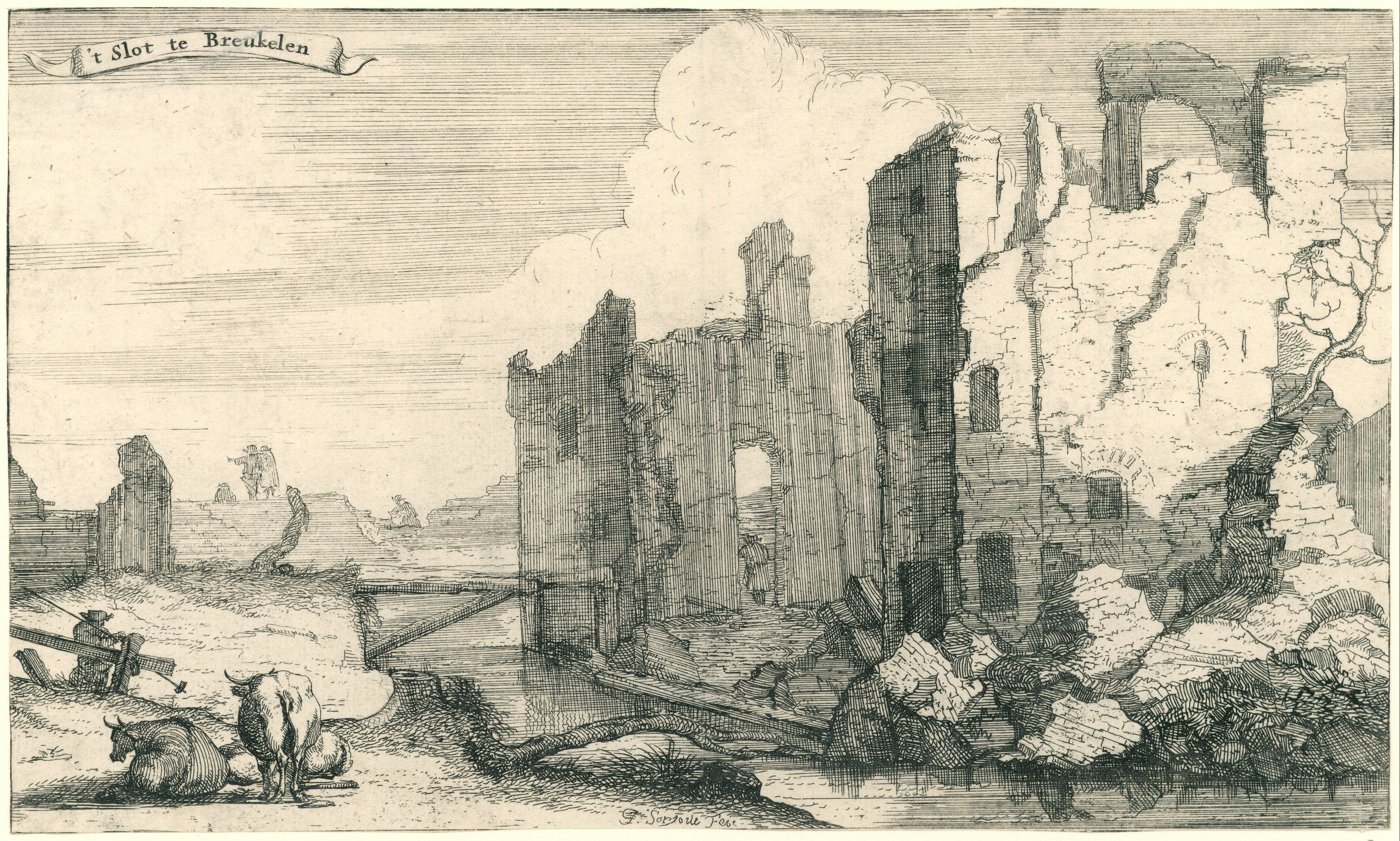
Isaac Sorious: 't Slot te Breukelen, an etching dating from 1672-1676 depicts the ruins of the second Castle Gunterstein after the destruction by French troops in the Franco-Dutch War. The demolished bridge and outer wall are shown with two men and three cows.

Gunterstein Castle (Dutch: Gunterstein) is a castle in Breukelen, on the river Vecht, that was the former home of the rich Dutch widow Magdalena Poulle (1626–1699). She bought the property and associated title after the former castle and stronghold was destroyed by the French in the Disaster Year Rampjaar 1672.

== History ==
The castle was built in 1681 on the foundations of an earlier castle, by the architect Adriaan Dortsman (who also designed the new Lutheran church in Amsterdam. The castle grounds had been home to two previous constructions; a 14th-century castle named after Gysbrecht Gunter was destroyed in 1511. After being rebuilt by Gunter descendants, it changed hands several times and belonged for a short time to Johan van Oldenbarnevelt until he was beheaded in 1619. That building was later burned by the French in 1672 along with nearby Castle Nijenrode.

The wealthy Amsterdam widow Magdalena Poulle bought the castle in 1680 and called herself Lady Gunterstein from then onwards. It is her family shield which is displayed above the windows. She planned to leave the house to her nephew Pieter and had him lay the first stone at age three. Her portrait was made also showing her nephew holding Dortsman's groundplan by the Amsterdam portrait painter David van der Plas, himself the son-in-law of the architect. This portrait still hangs above the mantelpiece where it was installed in 1683.

Magdalena Poulle became an avid gardener and amateur botanist commissioning a book of etchings called Veues de Gunterstein (Views of Gunterstein), dedicated to Madame de Gunterstein et de Thienhoven. This book contains one of the earliest pictures of a Dutch orangerie with hothouses, and was highly influential on later botanists and wealthy garden owners such as Agnes Block and George Clifford III, who also sought to grow unusual plants and record them in albums.

Today, Gunterstein is still home to descendants of Magdalena Poulle. The surrounding park which is open to the public, is protected as a rijksmonument, as well as all of the older structures around it.

== Gallery ==
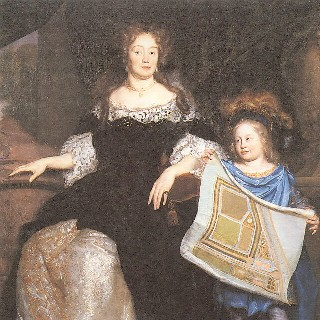
David van der Plas: Magdalena Poulle with her nephew Pieter in 1683, portraits with plans of the garden. Van der Plas was a son-in-law of the architect of Gunterstein Adriaan Dortsman.

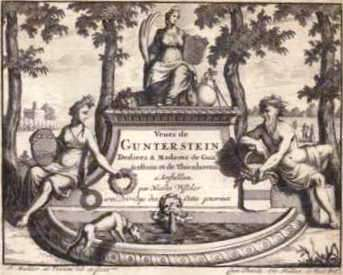
Joseph Mulder: "Veues de Gunterstein", book title page, ca. 1690

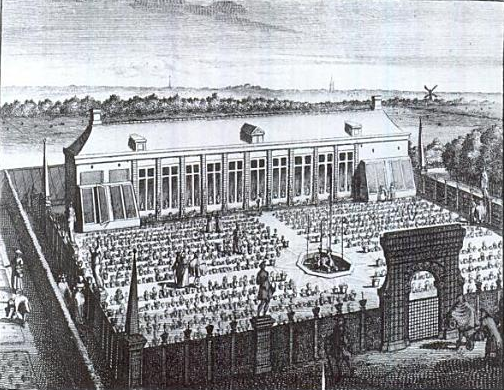
Joseph Mulder and De Lespine: Gunterstein orangerie, etching, ca. 1695

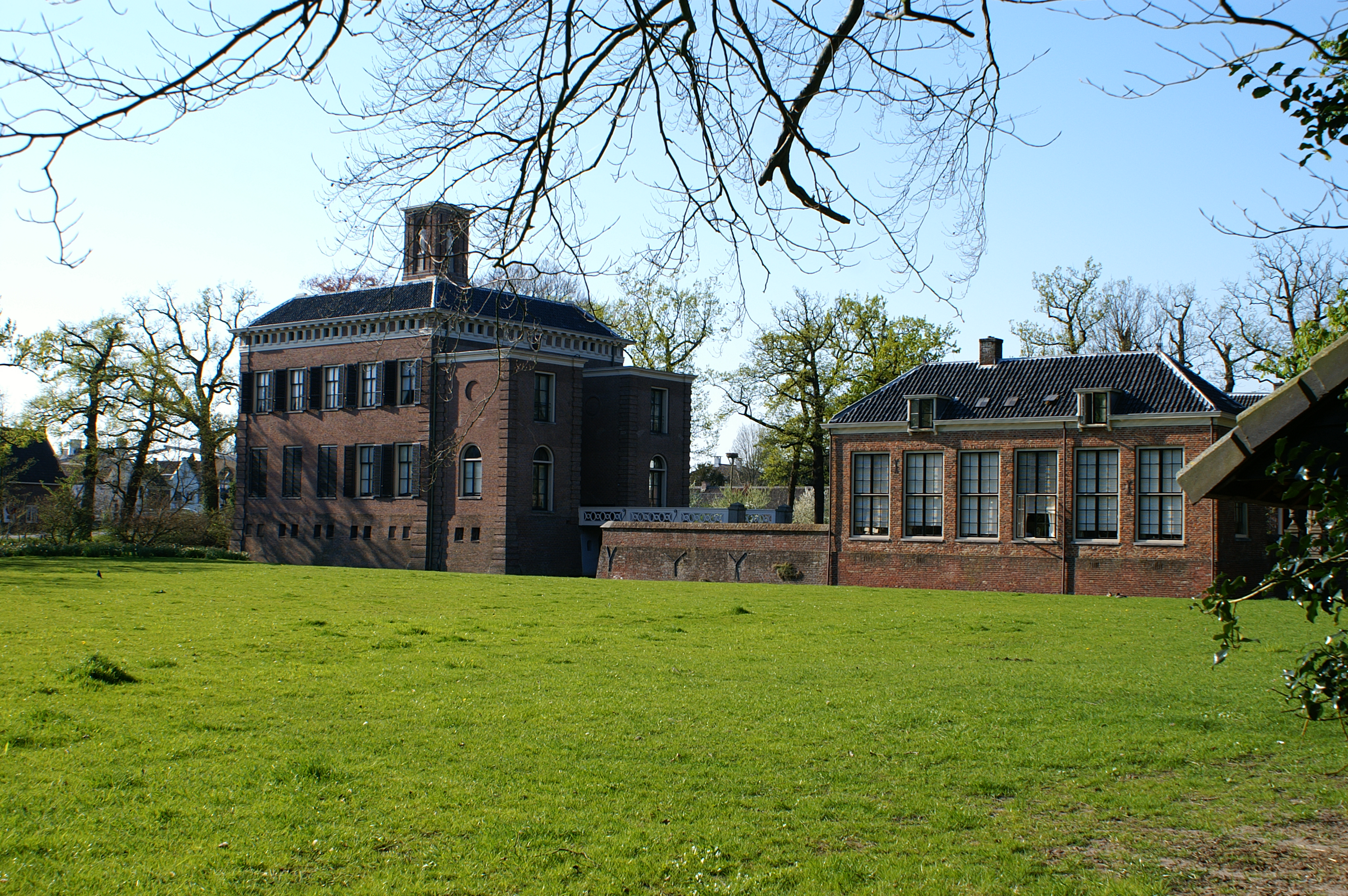
Gunterstein in 2007

== See also ==
- List of castles in the Netherlands
- Buitenplaats
