= Isaac Sorious =

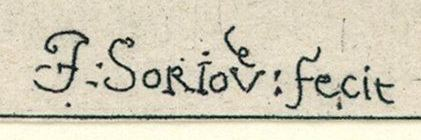
- Born: unknown unknown
- Died: unknown unknown
- Notable work: Het ontroerde Nederlandt, door de wapenen des konings van Vrankryk, 1674
- Style: Baroque; Chiaroscuro

Isaac Sorious (also known as J. Sorioue and I. Soriou, birth and death places and dates unknown, active in the years 1672–1676) was a Dutch Republic engraver, etcher and painter, who worked at Utrecht (1672–1673), Amsterdam (1672–1676) and possibly at Rome (1673–1676). He is known for his series of thirteen etchings, depicting the destruction by French troops in the Utrecht province during the Disaster Year Rampjaar 1672. He is also the author of satirical allegorical prints, for instance on the subject of stadtholder William III of Orange.

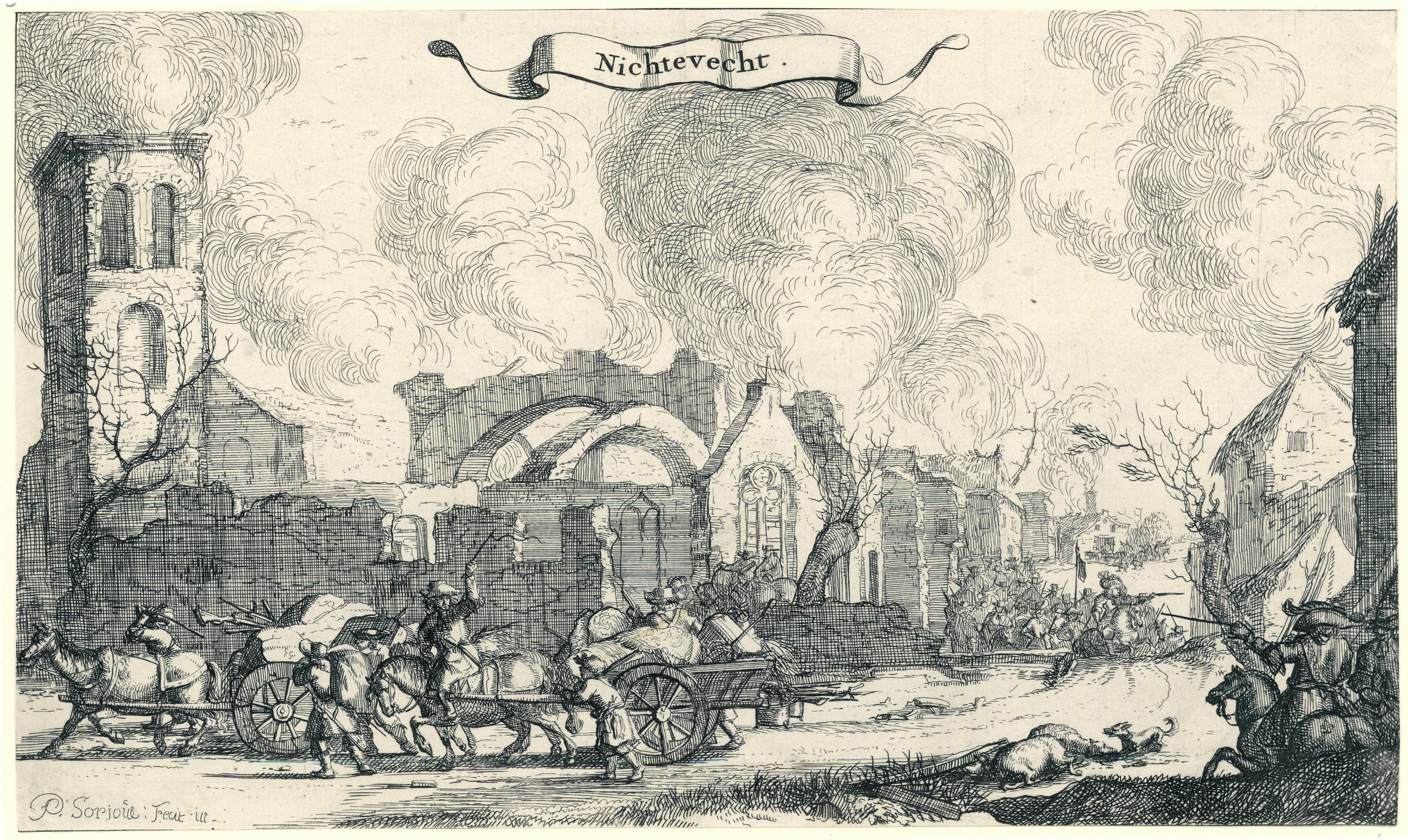
Nichtevecht. French troops plunder and shoot while passing through the ruins of the village Nigtevecht, 1672

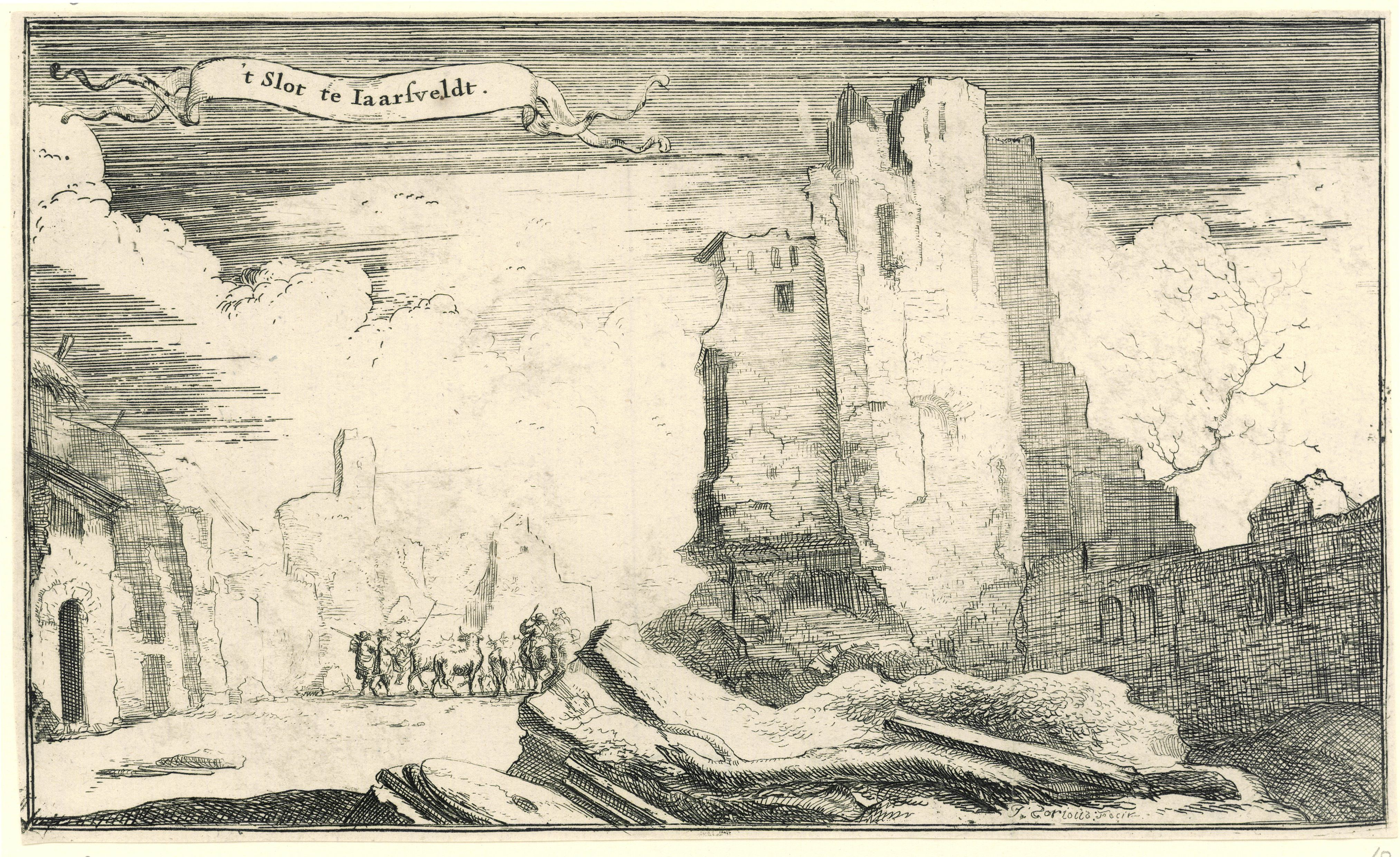
't Slot te Iaarsveldt (Castle Jaarsveld, Veldenstein Castle), destroyed by the French in 1672.

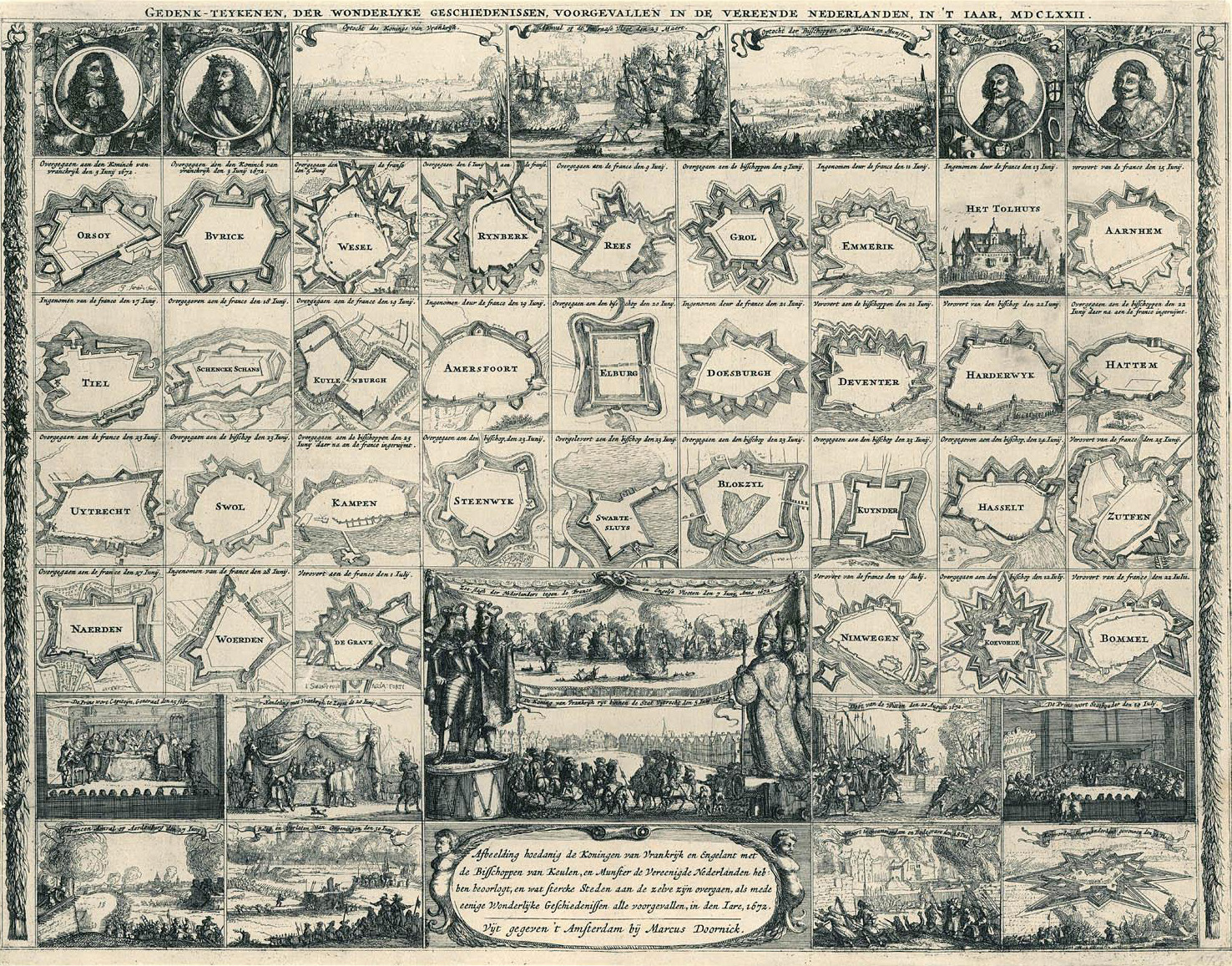
Gedenk-teykenen der wonderlyke geschiedenissen, voorgevallen in de Vereende Nederlanden in 't iaar MDCLXXII (1672). Translated title: Memorials of the wondrous histories, which occurred in the United Provinces (Dutch Republic) in the year 1672

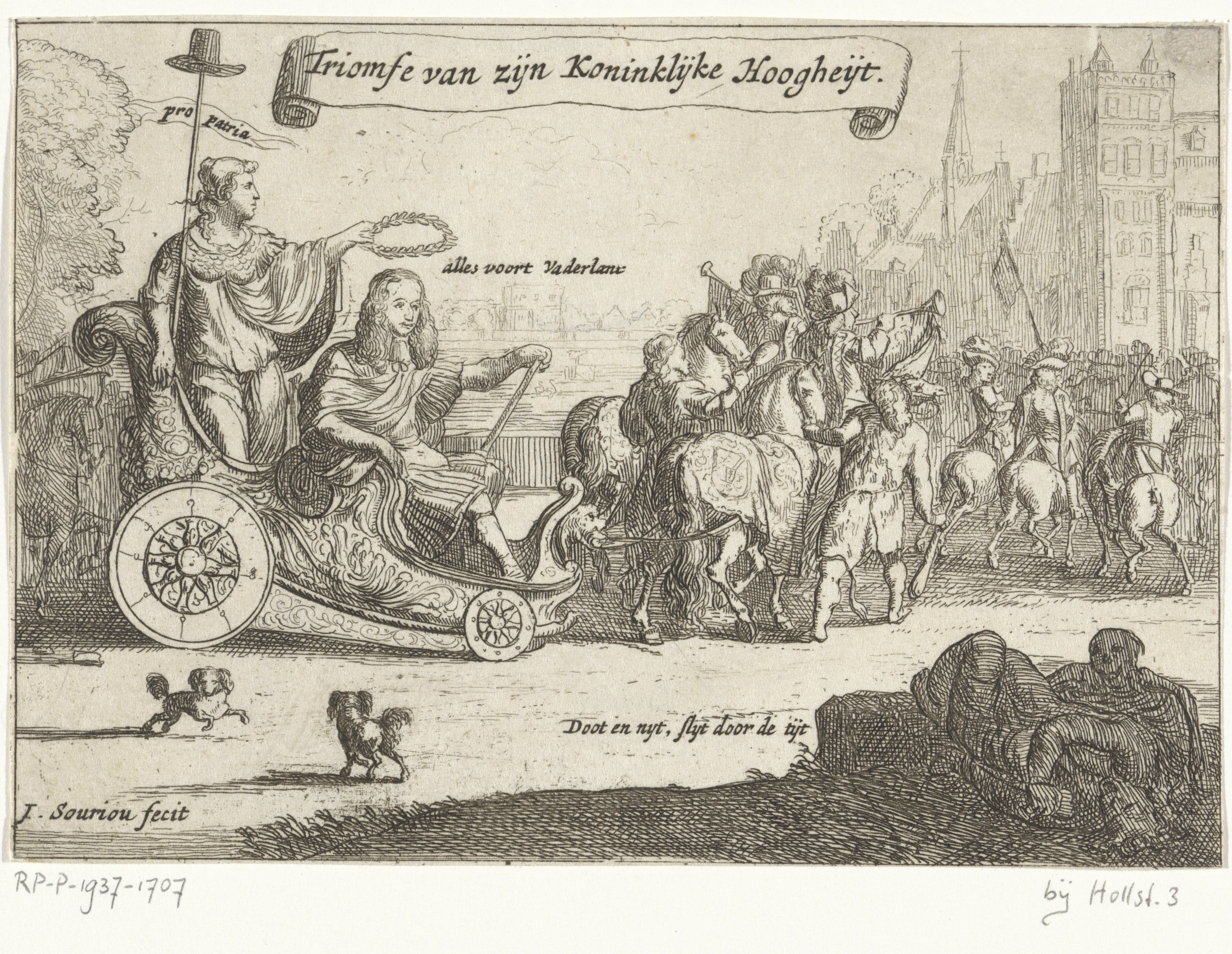
Triomfe van zijne Koninklijke Hoogheijt, 1672 - 1676. Translated title: Triumph of his Royal Highness, 1672 - 1676. Stadtholder William III is shown in a triumphal carriage after his victories in the Disaster Year Rampjaar 1672, under a laurel wreath. Allegories Doot (Death) and Nijt (Jealousy) are shown lying by the wayside at the right. Horsemen and heralds at the Binnenhof and Hofvijver, The Hague.
