= List of castles in the Netherlands =

This is a list of castles in the Netherlands per province.

== Overview of castles in the Netherlands ==
=== Drenthe ===
See also List of havezates in Drenthe

Castle	Location	Image
Coevorden Castle	Coevorden, Drenthe	

=== Flevoland ===
Castle	Location	Image
Almere Castle	Almere, Flevoland	

=== Friesland ===
See List of stins in Friesland

=== Gelderland ===
Castle	Location	Image
Ammersoyen Castle	Ammerzoden, Gelderland; 51°45′06″N 5°13′45″E	
Batenburg Castle	Batenburg, Gelderland; 51°49′25″N 5°37′52″E	
Bemmel Castle	Bemmel, Gelderland; 51°53′33″N 5°53′44″E	
Bergh Castle	's-Heerenberg, Gelderland; 51°52′27″N 6°14′27″E	
Biljoen Castle	Rheden, Gelderland; 51°59′48″N 5°59′33″E	
Blankenborg Castle	Beuningen, Gelderland; 51°51′52″N 5°46′12″E	
Brakel Castle	Brakel, Gelderland; 51°49′01″N 5°05′56″E	
Cannenburgh Castle	Vaassen, Gelderland; 52°17′30″N 5°58′00″E	
Doddendael Castle	Ewijk, Gelderland; 51°52′27″N 5°44′51″E	
Doornenburg Castle	Doornenburg, Gelderland; 51°53′37″N 5°59′56″E	
Doorwerth Castle	Doorwerth, Gelderland; 51°58′00″N 5°47′20″E	
Goudenstein Castle	Haaften, Gelderland; 51°49′00″N 5°13′00″E	
Hackfort Castle	Vorden, Gelderland; 52°06′00″N 6°16′37″E	
Hatert Castle	Nijmegen, Gelderland; 51°48′32″N 5°49′09″E	
Hernen Castle	Hernen, Gelderland; 51°50′4″N 5°40′35″E	
Jachtslot Sint Hubertus	Otterlo, Gelderland; 52°07′18″N 5°49′58″E	
De Kelder Castle; Hagen Castle	Doetinchem, Gelderland; 51°59′22″N 6°16′13″E	
Keppel Castle	Laag-Keppel, Gelderland; 51°59′37″N 6°13′38″E	
Kinkelenburg Castle	Bemmel, Gelderland; 51°53′23″N 5°53′46″E	
Merckenburg Castle	Heukelum, Gelderland; 51°52′40″N 5°05′24″E	
Loevestein Castle	Poederoijen, Gelderland; 51°48′59″N 5°01′14″E	
Huis van Malsen; Castle van Well	Well, Gelderland; 51°44′47″N 5°12′24″E	
Middachten Castle	De Steeg, Gelderland; 52°01′09″N 6°04′11″E	
Het Oude Loo	Apeldoorn, Gelderland; 52°14′07″N 5°56′32″E	
Nederhemert Castle	Nederhemert, Gelderland; 51°45′15″N 5°09′15″E	
Nijenbeek Castle	Voorst, Gelderland; 52°11′12″N 6°09′42″E	
Ophemert Castle	Ophemert, Gelderland; 51°50′53″N 5°23′26″E	
Poelwijk Castle	Gendt, Gelderland; 51°52′19″N 5°57′55″E	
Rosendael Castle	Rozendaal, Gelderland; 52°00′34″N 5°57′52″E	
Huis te Ruurlo	Ruurlo, Gelderland; 52°04′44″N 6°26′42″E	
Ryswyk Castle	Groessen, Gelderland; 51°55′37″N 6°01′59″E	
Slangenburg Castle	Doetinchem, Gelderland; 51°57′38″N 6°21′39″E	
Het Valkhof	Nijmegen, Gelderland; 51°50′52″N 5°52′15″E	
Huis te Vorden	Vorden, Gelderland; 52°06′05″N 6°19′21″E	
Waardenburg Castle	Waardenburg, Gelderland; 51°49′54″N 5°15′59″E	
Wageningen Castle	Wageningen, Gelderland; 51°57′59″N 5°40′01″E	
Waliën Castle	Winterswijk, Gelderland; 51°59′30″N 6°44′06″E	
Wisch Castle; Hof Terborg	Terborg, Gelderland; 51°55′03″N 6°21′23″E	
Wijenburg Castle	Echteld, Gelderland; 51°54′34″N 5°30′01″E	

=== Groningen ===
See List of borgs in Groningen (province)

=== Limburg ===
Castle	Construction date	Location	Image
Baarlo Castle		Maasbree, Limburg; 51°19′44″N 6°05′58″E	
Bleijenbeek Castle		Bleijenbeek, Limburg; 51°38′06″N 6°03′05″E	
Château Neercanne		Maastricht, Limburg; 50°49′07.9″N 5°40′03″E	
Château St. Gerlach		Houthem, Limburg; 50°52′10.4″N 5°47′57.7″E	
Genhoes Castle		Oud-Valkenburg, Limburg; 50°51′20″N 5°51′22″E	
Hillenraad Castle	Late 14th century with additions (e.g., towers) in the 17th and 18th century	Swalmen, Limburg; 51°13′18″N 6°2′03″E	
Hoensbroek Castle		Hoensbroek, Limburg; 50°55′01″N 5°55′05″E	
Jansgeleen Castle		Spaubeek, Limburg; 50°56′00″N 5°51′00″E	
Landsfort Heerlen		Heerlen, Limburg; 50°53′16″N 5°58′49″E	
Mheer Castle		Mheer, Limburg; 50°46′49″N 5°47′27″E	
Ouborg Castle	Approximately 1300	Swalmen, Limburg; 51°13′54″N 6°1′32″E	
Rivieren Castle		Voerendaal, Limburg; 50°53′50″N 5°55′28″E	
Schaloen Castle		Oud-Valkenburg, Limburg; 50°51′25″N 5°51′03″E	
Ter Worm Castle		Heerlen, Limburg; 50°53′22″N 5°56′59″E	
Valkenburg Castle		Valkenburg aan de Geul, Limburg; 50°51′43″N 5°49′52″E	
Well Castle		Well, Limburg; 51°33′9″N 6°5′20″E	
Wittem Castle		Wittem, Limburg; 50°48′50″N 5°54′36″E	

=== North Brabant ===
Castle	Location	Image
Aldendriel Castle	Mill, North Brabant; 51°41′14.54″N 5°47′17.83″E	
Great Castle	Deurne, North Brabant; 51°28′11″N 5°48′10″E	
Bouvigne Castle	Breda, North Brabant; 51°33′45″N 4°47′00″E	
Breda Castle	Breda, North Brabant; 51°35′17″N 4°46′19″E	
Croy Castle	Aarle-Rixtel, North Brabant; 51°30′00″N 5°37′27″E	
Dussen Castle	Werkendam, North Brabant; 51°44′02″N 4°58′10″E	
Dommelrode Castle	Sint-Oedenrode, North Brabant; 51°33′36″N 5°27′40″E	
Geldrop Castle	Geldrop-Mierlo, North Brabant; 51°25′29″N 5°33′35″E	
Heeswijk Castle	Heeswijk, North Brabant; 51°39′21″N 5°26′26″E	
Heeze Castle; Eymerick Castle	Heeze, North Brabant; 51°22′52″N 5°35′15″E	
Henkenshage	Sint-Oedenrode, North Brabant; 51°33′32″N 5°27′23″E	
Helmond Castle	Helmond, North Brabant; 51°28′37″N 5°39′10″E	
Maurick Castle	Vught, North Brabant; 51°39′31″N 5°18′20″E	
Nemerlaer Castle	Haaren, North Brabant; 51°35′21″N 5°13′54″E	
Loon op Zand Castle	Loon op Zand, North Brabant; 51°37′28″N 5°04′28″E	
Onsenoort Castle	Nieuwkuijk, North Brabant; 51°42′07″N 5°11′25″E	
Small Castle	Deurne, North Brabant; 51°28′24″N 5°48′15″E	
Stapelen Castle	Boxtel, North Brabant; 51°34′59″N 5°19′27″E	
Strijen Castle	Oosterhout, North Brabant; 51°39′19″N 4°51′32″E	
Slotje Limburg	Oosterhout, North Brabant; 51°38′25.19″N 4°51′30.53″E	
Tongelaar Castle	Beers, North Brabant; 51°42′47″N 5°46′48″E	
Zwijnsbergen Castle	Helvoirt, North Brabant; 51°38′32″N 5°13′19″E	

=== North Holland ===
Castle	Location	Image
Slot Assumburg	Heemskerk, North Holland; 52°30′18″N 4°41′07″E	
Brederode Castle	Santpoort, North Holland; 52°25′31″N 4°37′21″E	
Huis ter Kleef	Haarlem, North Holland; 52°23′44″N 4°38′13″E	
Slot Heemstede	Heemstede, North Holland; 52°20′23″N 4°37′53″E	
Ilpenstein Castle	Ilpendam, North Holland; 52°27′52″N 4°57′27″E	
Muider Castle (Muiderslot)	Muiden, North Holland; 52°20′03″N 5°04′17″E	
Radboud Castle	Medemblik, North Holland; 52°46′21″N 5°06′47″E	

=== Overijssel ===
Castle	Location	Image
Huize Almelo	Almelo, Overijssel; 52°21′29″N 6°40′18″E	
Rechteren Castle	Dalfsen, Overijssel; 52°29′52″N 6°17′20″E	
Twickel Castle	Delden, Overijssel; 52°15′59″N 6°42′54″E	
Waardenborg Castle	Holten, Overijssel; 52°16′53″N 6°25′07″E	

=== South Holland ===
Castle	Location	Image
Huys Dever	Lisse, South Holland; 52°14′56″N 4°32′51″E	
Duivenvoorde Castle	Voorschoten, South Holland; 52°06′41″N 4°25′03″E	
Burcht van Leiden	Leiden, South Holland; 52°09′32″N 4°29′33″E	
Rhoon Castle	Rhoon, South Holland; 51°51′37″N 4°25′05″E	
Slot Teylingen	Voorhout, South Holland; 52°13′52″N 4°31′09″E	

=== Utrecht ===
See also List of manors in Utrecht

Castle	Location	Image
Amerongen Castle	Amerongen, Utrecht; 51°59′44″N 5°27′31″E	
Beesde Castle; Huis Cammingha	Bunnik, Utrecht; 52°04′19″N 5°11′46″E	
Beverweerd Castle	Werkhoven, Utrecht; 52°01′55″N 5°15′00″E	
Bolenstein	Maarssen, Utrecht; 52°08′24″N 5°02′11″E	
Huis Doorn	Doorn, Utrecht; 52°01′53″N 5°20′19″E	
Drakensteyn Castle	Lage Vuursche, Utrecht; 52°10′47″N 5°13′38″E	
Duurstede Castle	Wijk bij Duurstede, Utrecht; 51°58′10″N 5°20′36″E	
De Haar Castle	Vleuten, Utrecht; 52°07′17″N 4°59′11″E	
Gunterstein Castle	Breukelen, Utrecht; 52°10′20″N 5°0′21″E	
Hamtoren (Den Ham Castle)	Vleuten, Utrecht; 52°06′20″N 4°59′44″E	
Hardenbroek Castle	Driebergen, Utrecht; 52°00′39″N 5°17′01″E	
Harmelen Castle	Harmelen, Utrecht; 52°05′46″N 4°58′03″E	
Hinderstein Castle	Langbroek, Utrecht; 52°00′52″N 5°18′40″E	
Loenersloot Castle	Loenersloot, Utrecht; 52°13′46″N 4°59′49″E	
Lunenburg Castle	Langbroek, Utrecht; 52°00′43″N 5°19′12″E	
Moersbergen Castle	Doorn, Utrecht; 52°01′37″N 5°19′11″E	
Nijenrode Castle	Breukelen, Utecht; 52°09′49″N 5°00′33″E	
Sterkenburg Castle	Sterkenburg, Utrecht; 52°01′24″N 5°17′01″E	
Vredenburg Castle	Utrecht (city), Utrecht; 52°05′33″N 5°06′50″E	
Woerden Castle	Woerden, Utrecht; 52°05′06″N 4°53′17″E	
Zuylen Castle	Oud-Zuilen, Utrecht; 52°04′37″N 5°04′23″E	

=== Zeeland ===
Castle	Location	Image
Baarland Castle	Baarland, Zeeland; 51.408633°N 3.886885°E	
Haamstede Castle	Haamstede, Zeeland; 51°41′51″N 3°44′30″E	
Hellenburg	Baarland, Zeeland; 51°24′32″N 3°52′46″E	
Moermond Castle	Renesse, Zeeland; 51°44′00″N 3°47′11″E	
Sabbinge Castle	Oud-Sabbinge, Zeeland; 51°31′56″N 3°47′58″E	
Westhove Castle	Domburg, Zeeland; 51°34′10″N 3°31′19″E	

== See also ==
- List of castles
- List of borgs in Groningen (province)
- List of havezates in Drenthe
- List of manors in Utrecht
- List of stins in Friesland
- List of castles and châteaux in Belgium
- List of castles in France
- List of castles in Germany
- List of castles in Luxembourg
