= Almere Castle =

Castle in Flevoland, Netherlands

- Almere, Flevoland
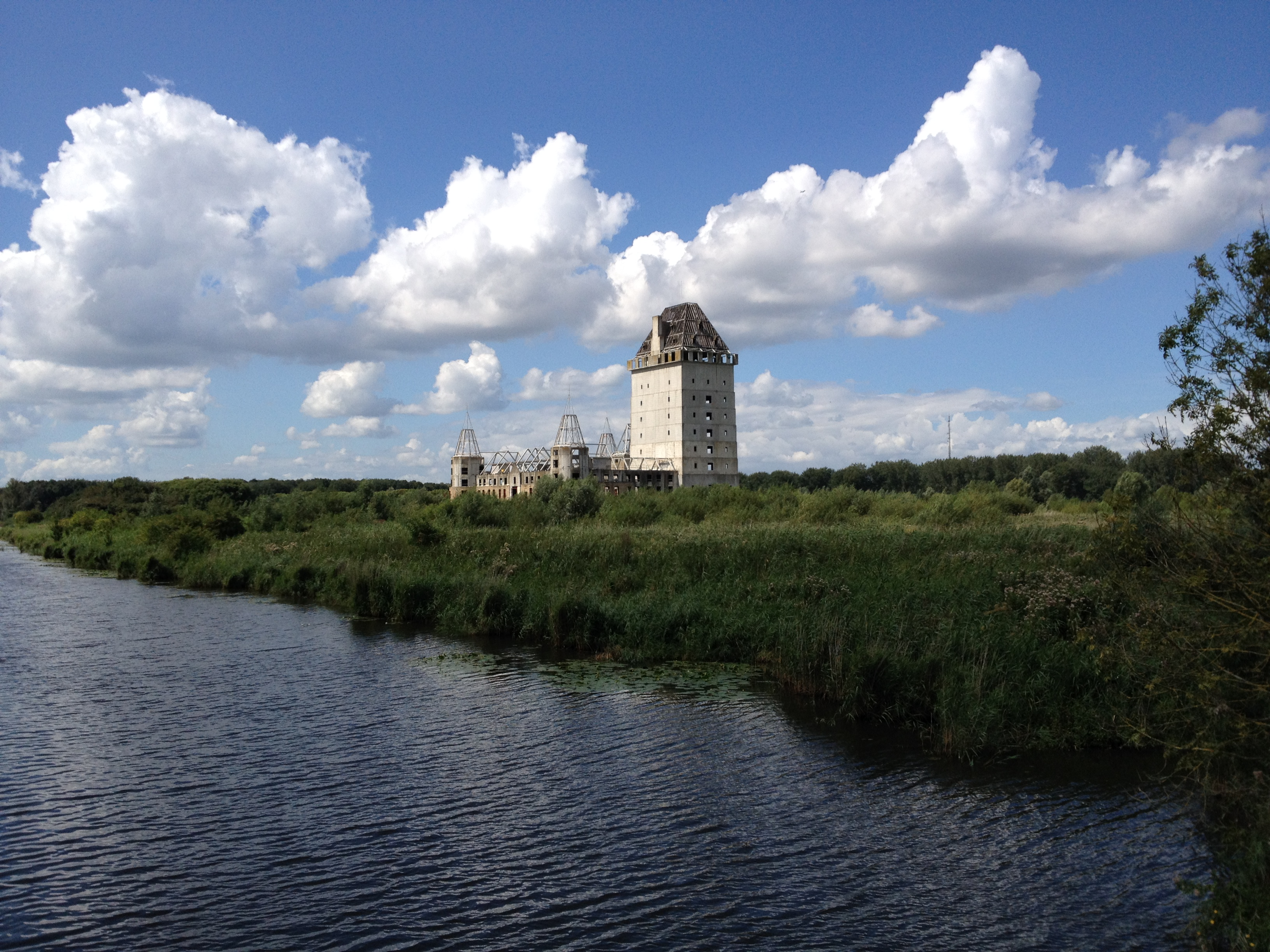

Location
- Coordinates: 52.3482°N 5.2474°E

Almere Castle is a half-finished castle in the Dutch town of Almere in the province of Flevoland, Netherlands. Construction started in 2000 but was halted in 2002, after which the building has turned into a contemporary ruin. It is located on the Oude Waterlandseweg in Almere Haven and is visible from the A6 motorway.

== History ==
The plans for building the castle date from 1999. The design is based on the 13th century Jemeppe Castle in Hargimont Belgium. The first pile was driven on 15 September 2000. The costs of the castle were initially estimated at 60 million guilders (more than 27 million euros), later increased to 120 million guilders. Due to financial problems, the construction project was halted in 2002.

In 2005 the project was bought by the previously established company Gravin BV. In addition to a hotel and a wedding location in the castle, Gravin BV also wanted to build houses on the site. However, to make the latter possible, a change to the zoning plan was necessary. In 2008, the Almere municipal council decided not to agree to a proposal to that effect.

Since 2013 there were plans to build an amusement park called WitchWorld in and around the castle. In October 2015, WitchWorld took an option to buy the castle for 20 million euros from Gravin BV, with an escape clause if the plans for the amusement park would not be financially or politically successful. Since the financing of the park could indeed not be realized, it did not come to an actual purchase. In November 2016, WitchWorld promoters were given more time to arrange funding, but the entire project was halted in October 2018.

== See also ==
- List of castles in the Netherlands
