= Goudenstein Castle =

Dutch castle

Coordinates: 51°48′52.265″N 5°12′45.842″E

Goudenstein Castle is a castle ruin in Haaften, a village in the municipality of Neerijnen in the Dutch province of Gelderland.

== History ==
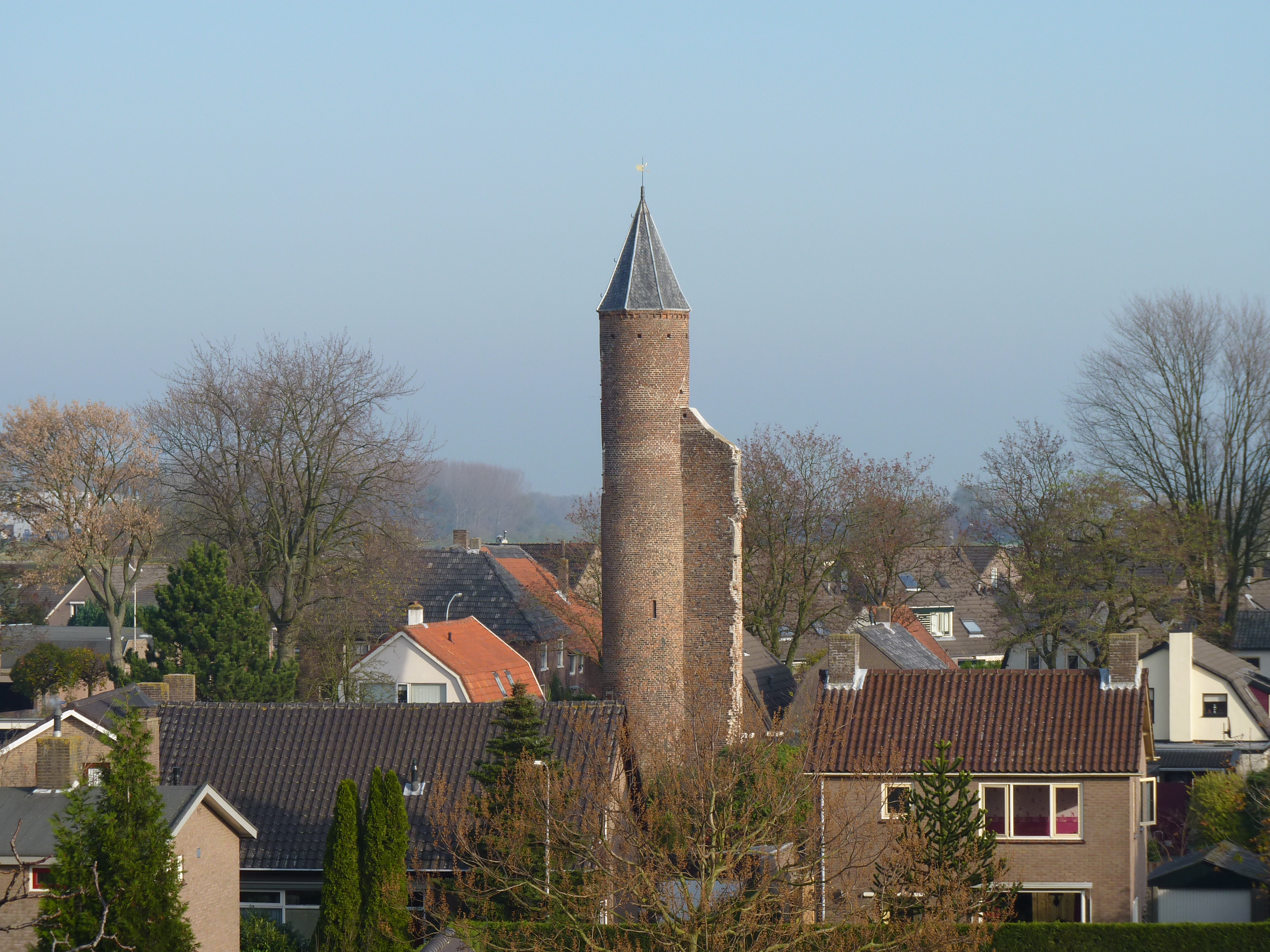

From the 13th century there is talk of the castle, its builders and residents, the Van Haeften family. In the disaster year 1672, the castle was destroyed by the French troops of King Louis XIV, leaving only one corner tower. The tower is approximately 19 meters high and 3.5 meters in diameter. Halfway through, traces of tilting are visible in the wall work. The corridor was originally at this height, the wall below it has a thickness of 1.10 meters, while above it the wall is only 25 centimeters. The wall was probably raised in the 16th century. The Dutry van Haeften family, relatives but no direct descendants of the builders, retained the remaining tower until 1975. The Friends of Geldersche Kasteelen Foundation acquired the tower and took care of it.

The tower stands in the backyard of two houses in the Dreef and is not accessible to the public, but can be viewed from the Dreef and also, but less well from the Koningsstraat and the Goudensteinstraat which is named after the ruin. Together with the Protestant church and flour mill De Blauwe Reiger, Goudenstein determines the Haaften skyline. Because Haaften lies in a protrusion of the Waalbandijk, these three can be seen from various directions at various kilometers, for example from the dikes in Waardenburg and Herwijnen and from the other side of the Waal from Zaltbommel to Nieuwaal and in clear weather even from the dike between Zuilichem and Brakel.

== See also ==
- List of castles in the Netherlands
