= Keppel Castle =

17th century Dutch castle

Coordinates: 51°59′36.74″N 6°13′37.7″E

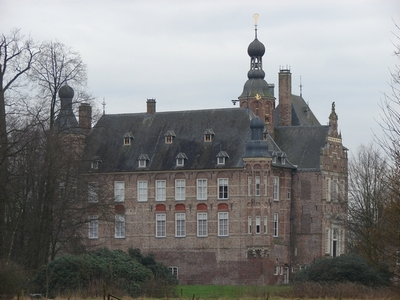
Keppel Castle

Keppel Castle is a castle in the town of Laag-Keppel in the municipality of Bronckhorst, in the Dutch province of Gelderland. The castle stands on an island between two branches of the Oude IJssel. The current building was rebuilt in the 17th century after it was destroyed in 1582.

== History ==
=== Construction history ===
Around the medieval keep (ca. 1300), a castle was built that would change little until the 16th century. After violence, the castle had fallen into a ruin between 1582 and 1609 and rebuilding began in 1609. In 1612 the city architect Willem van Bommel from Emmerik was commissioned to completely rebuild the castle. He used demolition stones on the still standing walls. After 1614, the impressive Renaissance top façade was placed against the side façades of the gate. This work was completed around 1620. Between 1740 and 1750 the complex was expanded at the rear by architect Gerrit Ravenschot. He delivered his work in 1750. In 1780 the gatehouse was radically changed. Finally, in 1850, the rear of the IJssel and the auditorium wings were connected, completing the construction.

=== War ===
Keppel Castle experienced many acts of war during the Middle Ages. Especially during the Eighty Years' War. In 1581, the castle was besieged and occupied by the Staatsen. Frederik van Pallandt, son of Johan van Pallandt and Elisabeth van Voorst and Keppel, again launched a counterattack a month later and took the castle again. In September 1582 the States attacked for the second time. That had to be done cautiously because of the large quantities of gunpowder, and they stormed the castle in the old-fashioned style, during which the castle was thoroughly destroyed. In 1665, after the reconstruction, the bishop of Bernhard von Galen (better known as Bommen Berend) took the castle, cleared the castle in 1666 and then had the defenses around the castle dismantled. Louis XIV set up the castle as headquarters in 1672, but much damage was done to the castle by looting French and Münster troops in the same year. After the Dutch War quiet times dawned for the castle.

=== Present day ===
From 1962 the castle has been owned by the Pallandt van Keppel Foundation, which has made it possible to keep the castle, furniture and park together so that it can still be inhabited by the family. The castle was never sold, the current residents are descended from the 14th-century owner. The castle is situated on an estate that was 1600 hectares in the nineteenth century and 560 hectares in the twenty-first century. [2] It consists partly of forest and it includes a number of farms and houses.

The castle is a municipal wedding location.

Every year the Van Lyndens open the grounds to the local community to celebrate the arrival of Sinterklaas, to hold the hexathlon on the occasion of the popular festivals and to experience the annual fireworks.

Since 2008, the Van Lyndens have been organizing an open-air theater performance by Shakespeares in their garden, performed by the English 'British Open Air Theater Company Illyria'. In 2008 A Midsummer Night's Dream was performed, in 2009 The Merry Wives of Windsor and in 2015 As You Like It. Spectators may bring their own picnic and walk around the park before they start.

== Literature ==
- Verhalen over landgoederen en buitenplaatsen in Gelderland. Wageningen, 2012, p. 144-155.

== See also ==
- List of castles in the Netherlands
