= Biljoen Castle =

Castle in Netherlands

Castle Biljoen
- Rheden, the Netherlands
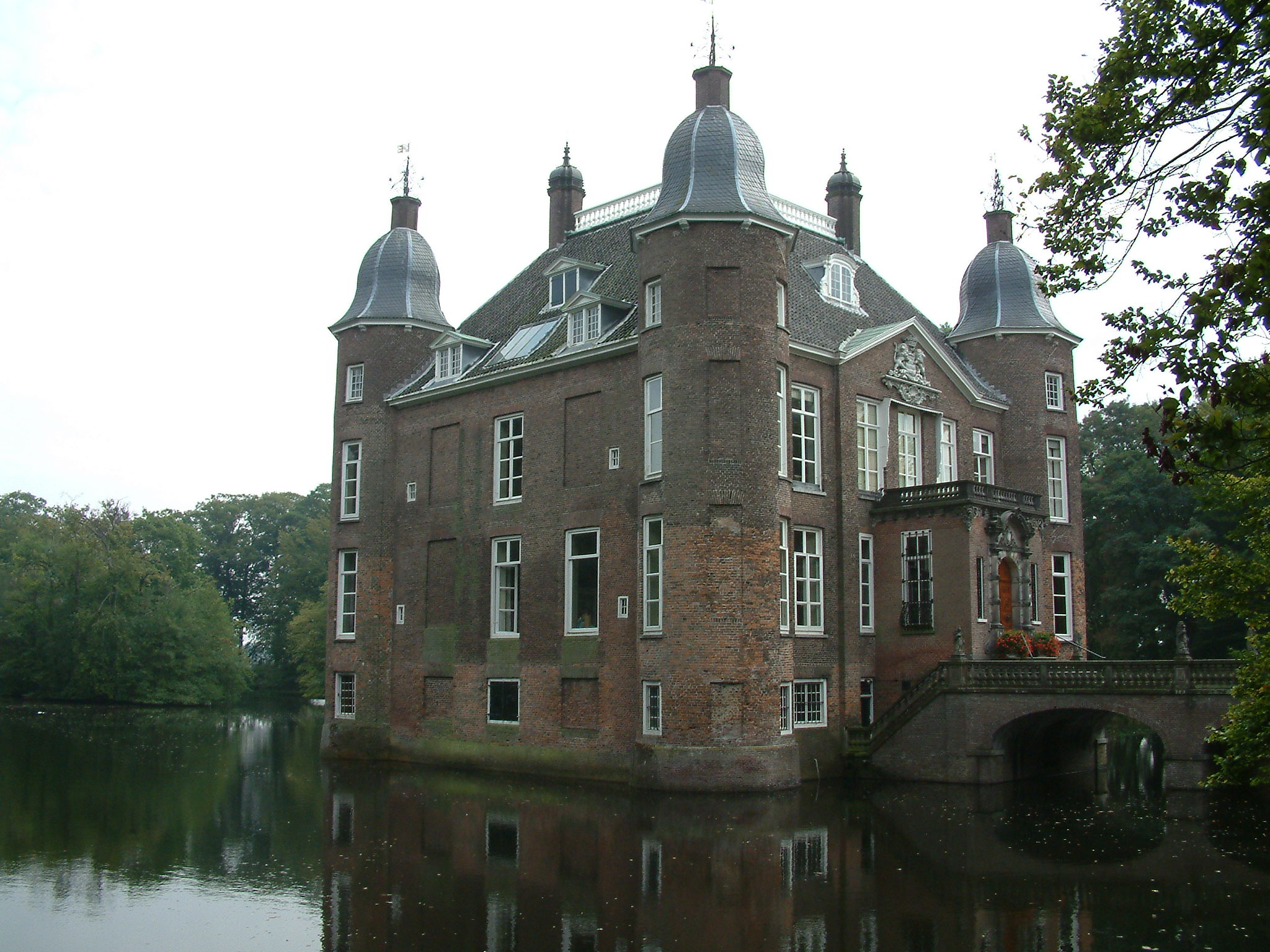
- Castle Biljoen

Site information
- Type: Castle
- Open to the public: No
- Condition: Good

Location
- The Netherlands
- Coordinates: 51°59′48″N 5°59′33″E

Site history
- Built: 1530
- Built by: Charles, Duke of Guelders
- Materials: Brick

Castle Biljoen lies between the Veluwe and the IJssel near Velp. This Noble House from the 16th century was rebuilt by Alexander van Spaen (1619–1692) into the present day castle with four equal corner towers.

== History ==
The castle is thought to have its original as a large farm, first mentioned in 1076. In 1530 Charles, Duke of Guelders made it into a castle, including the towers. In the 18th century the family Van Spaen built the castle into its current state.

In 1795, French troops were quartered in the castle. After they left was plundered, the interior being largely destroyed. It was restored with ornamental plaster and ceiling paintings (among other things).

== Ownership ==
The estate was originally called Broekerhof, and was a place where taxes were collected. In 1076 it was donated by Henry IV, Holy Roman Emperor to the Sint-Pieter Chapter in Utrecht. In 1530 it was sold to Charles, Duke of Guelders. He in turn had to sell it again in 1535 because of debts. It came into possession of Charles' general Roelof van Lennep. Roelof's son Carl, mayor of Arnhem, inherited it in 1546. His son Roelof inherited it in turn in 1567. After family divisions it was sold to the baronial family Van Spaen in 1661. In 1849 baron Van Hardenbroek allowed Anna Pavlovna of Russia to use it temporarily. In 1872 it was inherited by the family Lüps, until 2008.

On July 25, 2008 part of the inventory of the castle was sold at Christie's in Amsterdam.

== See also ==
- List of castles in the Netherlands
