= Hackfort Castle =

Dutch castle

Coordinates: 52.1002°N 6.2767°E

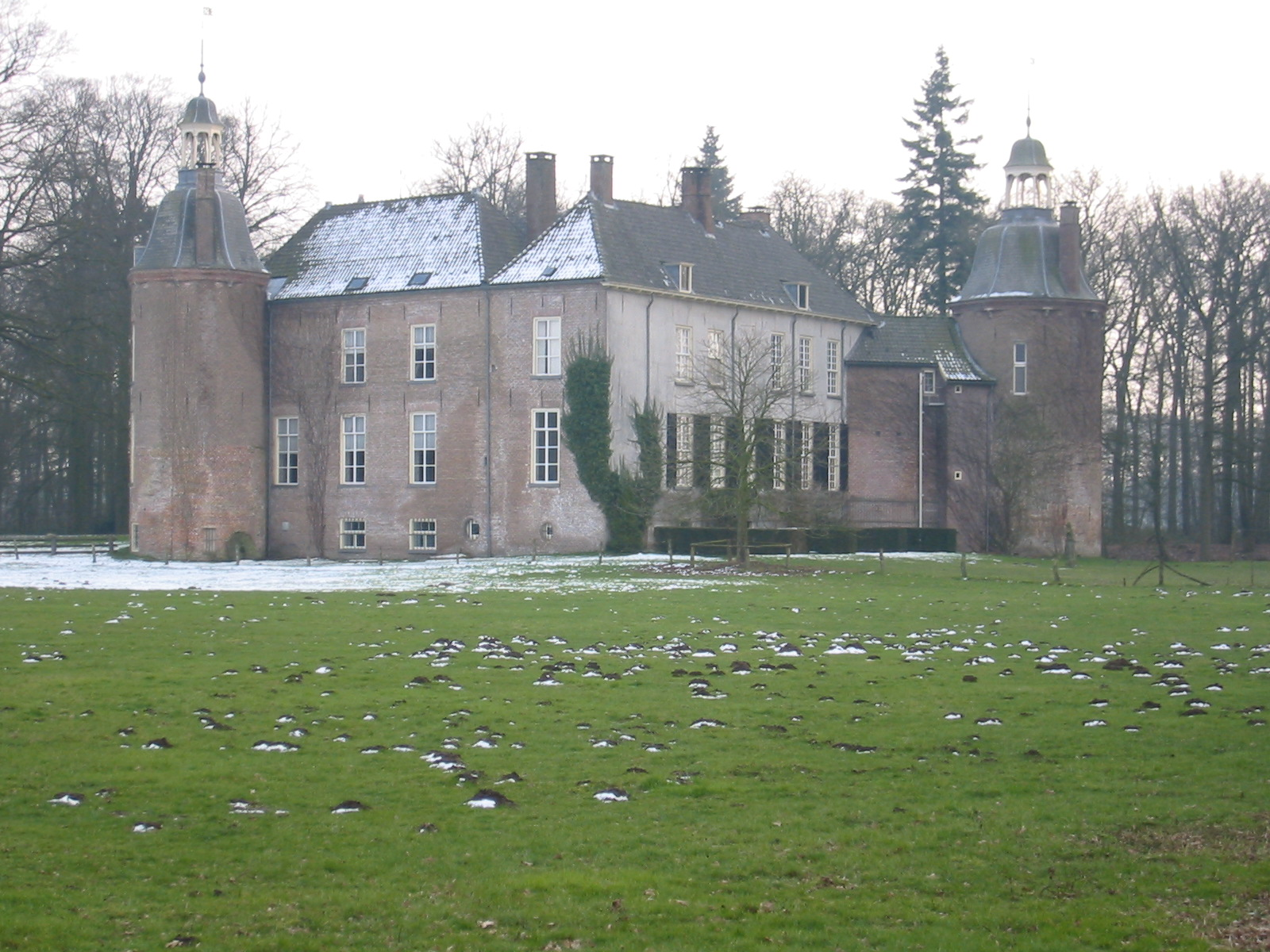
Hackfort Castle

Hackfort Castle is a castle in Vorden, in the Dutch province of Gelderland. The castle is owned by the Vereniging Natuurmonumenten, the Society for Preservation of Nature Monuments.

== Architectural history ==
Hackfort Castle's earliest known history can be traced back to 1324, when the Lord of Bronckhorst commissioned the building of a castle. In 1392, the lending register of the lords of Bronckhorst mentions "Hacforden", a house with an outer bailey and moat.

The castle was largely destroyed by Spanish troops in 1586 during the Eighty Years' War, and later rebuilt in 1598 by Borchard van Westerholt. The castle was considerably remodeled in 1788 by Borchard Frederic Willem van Westerholt. The new structure had a tighter façade with large windows and cross windows with window shutters at the bottom. The gatehouse was demolished, so that the view of the now symmetrical façade and the landing became unobstructed. The moat was also filled in. The castle is surrounded by forests and meadows and includes the watermill of Hackfort.

== Owners ==
In 1324, a Willem van Bronckhorst sold a share in "Hacvorde" to Jacob van der Welle, who subsequently styled himself Van Hackfort. Leenheer remained the Van Bronckhorsten until 1702. In 1581, the castle came into the Van Raesfelt family's possession via their heiress daughter Jacoba van Hackfort. In 1602, through their daughter Margarethe, it was inherited by her cousin Borchard van Westerholt, who had rebuilt the castle before her death. It remained in the possession of the barons Van Westerholt for centuries.

When Borchard Frederik Willem of the Westerholt family died in 1934, he left his five children as heirs. They were all unmarried except for Clara. Clara was evicted in 1935. Her brother and three sisters each retained a quarter share of ownership. In 1964 their 'lady sister' died at The Hague. She left her share in the castle to Natuurmonumenten. In the same year her brother Arend made a will in which he also left his quarter to Natuurmonumenten. Arend and his sisters continued to manage the castle until the last heir died. Arend died on October 8, 1970, his sister Lady Emma on November 28, 1971. The remaining sister, Sannie, was then the sole individual owner of Hackfort. Lady Sannie was the last Westerholt to die on April 14, 1981, with which Hackfort became wholly owned by Natuurmonumenten.

== See also ==
- List of castles in the Netherlands

== Sources ==
- Kasteel Hackfort op de website Kastelen in Gelderland
- Geslacht Hackfort, De Graafschap
- Hackfort. Huis & landgoed. Utrecht, Matrijs, 1998.
