= Hellenburg =

Castle in Baarland, Netherlands

- De Hellenburg or Kasteel Hellenburg
- Baarland, the Netherlands
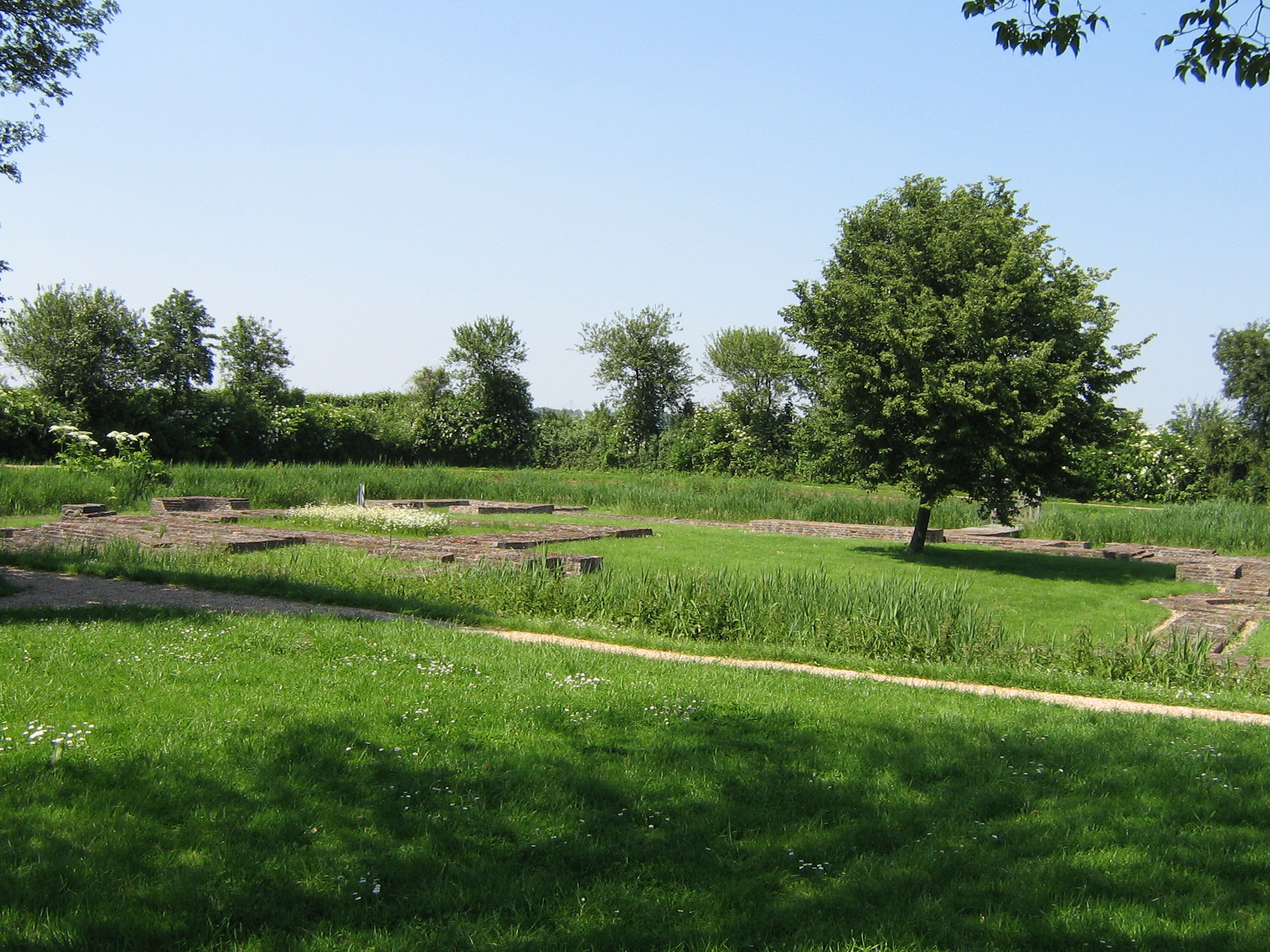
- Ruins of the Hellenburg in 2006

Site information
- Type: Water castle
- Open to the public: No
- Condition: Consolidated foundations

Location
- The Netherlands
- Coordinates: 51.4091°N 3.8795°E

Site history
- Built: First half 14th century
- Materials: brick
- Demolished: Flooded 1477
- Events: Cosmas- and Damian Flood (1477)

Hellenburg is a ruined castle near Baarland, in Zeeland, Netherlands.

== Characteristics ==
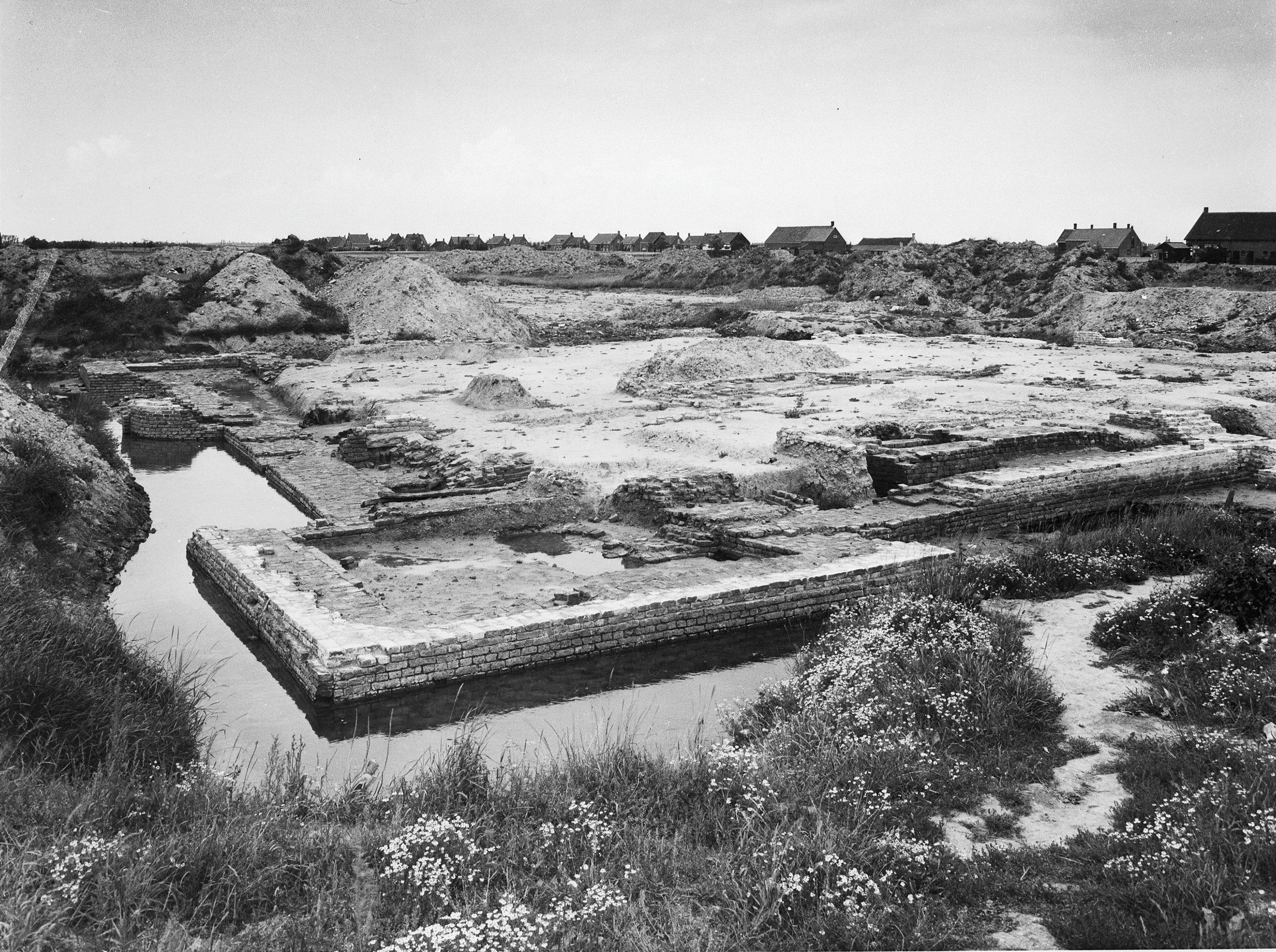
In July 1958

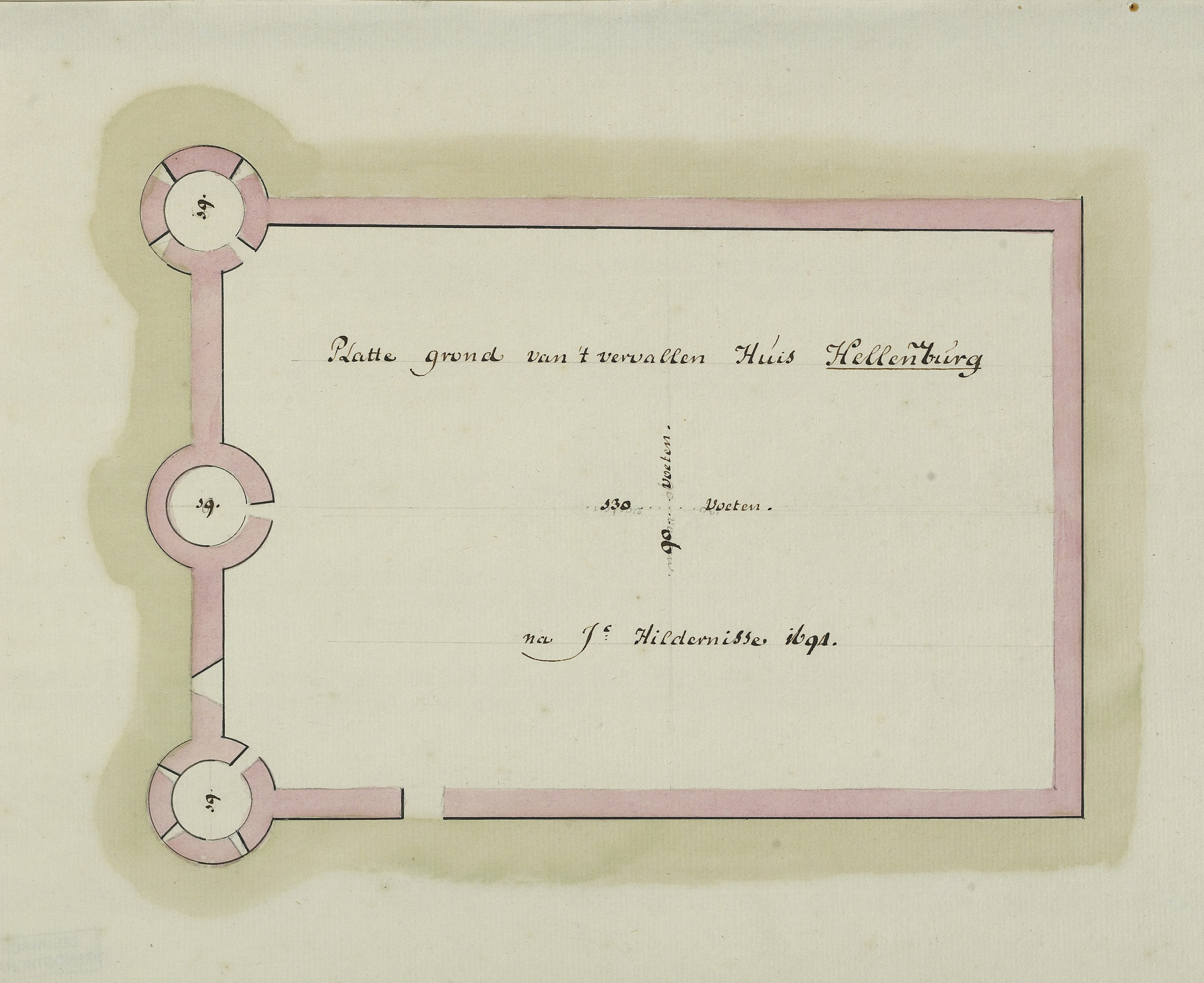
Floor plan from 1694

Hellenburg is amongst the rare castles that completely disappeared over time. By the 1950s Baarland municipality knew not much more than the approximate location of the Hellenburg. 17th century depictions of a large castle seemed exaggerated. In early 1958 a land consolidation plan led to archaeological excavations at the site, led by Jaap Renaud.

=== The tower house ===
The first phase of Hellenburg was a tower house. It measured 11 by 11 m on the outside. With walls of 2 m thick, the inside space was only 7 by 7 m. On the southwest corner the tower house had a privy tower. The south side of the tower house stood in the moat. The three other sides had such shallow foundations that they were surely not in the moat.

The brick used for the first tower house measured 28 * 13.5 * 6.5 cm. Renaud therefore dated the first phase of the Hellenburg to about the mid-fourteenth century.

=== The 15th century castle ===
In a later phase, the Hellenburg was expanded to a major castle. It got three round towers on the east side, and three heavy square towers.

What was remarkable, is that the tower came to lie within the walls of the new castle, instead of being re-used as a corner tower, which was the usual way to expand a tower house.

It was even more strange that the southern wall of the tower house came to lie within two new rooms created by an inner wall. A new outside wall led from a new square southwest tower to a new round southeast tower. The southern wall of the tower house was then demolished. The northern part of the tower house was probably left to serve as living space.

It is probable that on the western side of the new castle, there was a large hall, indicated by the small section of wall that runs south for about 3.5 m over the courtyard in the direction of the tower house. The other rooms had less practical measurements, like 10 * 3 m for the southwest room.

In a still later phase the heavy square tower in the center of the south wing, with its two privy towers was added. The original southern outside wall was found inside this tower. At the northeast corner of the second castle the two small rooms between the gate and the northeast tower were built last. These contained small bricks of only 21–23 cm length, the smallest found at the Hellenburg. These were also used in the round corner tower.

=== Measurements ===
In 1691 Hildernisse drew a floor plan of what he could still observe of the Hellenburg. He gave the diameter of the round towers as 19 feet, which was in line with the 5.10-5.86 m found by Renaud in 1958. Hildernisse gave 130 by 90 feet for the complete main castle, which was also about correct. Obviously Hildernisse could only see the remarkable configuration of three round towers in a line. The rest he had to guess, and supposed this was a simple square.

=== The outer bailey ===
The outer bailey of the castle did not show signs of any serious defensive works. It is remarkable that the outer bailey seems to have been connected to the main castle by a dam, instead of a bridge.

Apart from that, only a few details of the outer bailey were discovered during the excavations.

== History ==
=== Location ===
Hellenburg Castle is located just under 500 meters west of Baarland Castle. This makes it possible to confuse the history of the two, and harder to connect owners and castles.

=== Van Renesse ===
Canon Zeeland, Hellenburg

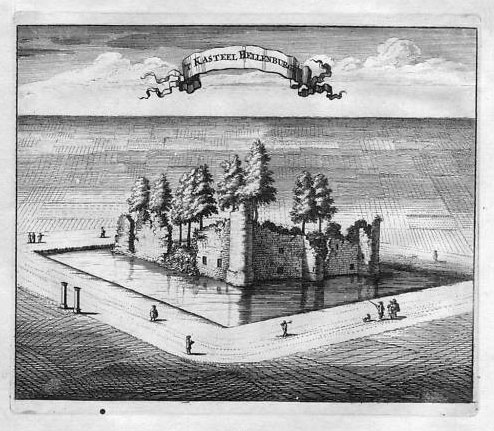
In 1696

The foundation of the Hellenburg is related to the downfall of the Van Renesse family. In 1297 their leader John III, Lord of Renesse lost Moermond Castle during a siege. He was killed in 1304. In 1312 his brothers Hendrik and Costijn van Renesse then gave their lands in Schouwen / Renesse to William III of Holland in exchange for the count's lands in West Baarland, Bakendorp and Oudelande.

Hendrik's son Jan (c. 1305–1348) is the presumed founder of the tower house at Hellenburg. He married the Utrecht heiress Aleyd van Lichtenberg, which gave him important possessions in Rhijnauwen. In 1352 his widow was mentioned as lady of Rhijnauwen, Lichtenberg and Hellenburg. Jan's oldest son Jan (b. c. 1430–1415) would be styled as lord of Rhynauwen, Lichtenberg, Baarland, Stuvesand and Bakendorp. In 1413 this Jan was banished from Utrecht, and retired to his Holland possessions. He was succeeded by his son Jan, who died in 1438, and was buried in Utrecht, like his father. Both were buried in Utrecht, indicating that the Hellenburg was not that important to them.

Next came Frederik van Renesse. His marriage to Elisabeth van Kruiningen, indicates a renewed interest in Zeeland. During the wars in Utrecht, Frederik retired to the Hellenburg in about 1450. He died there on 20 September 1452. His widow and her five children then remained there. Frederick is believed to have built the castle of which we now see the extensive ruins.

=== The Cosmas and Damian Flood (1477) ===
The finds from the 1957-1958 archaeological excavations allow us to date the abandonment of the castle to about 1475. This is in line with a supposed destruction during the Cosmas and Damian Flood of 1477. Renaud noted that Reygersberg extensively reported about the floods of 1530 and 1532, that he personally witnessed, and that these can therefore be excluded.

=== Decay ===
Frederik's son Jan married Cornelia van Bouchoven. When he had to leave Utrecht in 1481, he went to his wife's possessions in Flanders, and not to the Hellenburg. The descendants of this Jan van Renesse are the Counts of Renesse van Oostmalle, and still live in Belgium.

In 1613 another Jan van Renesse, Lord of Malle would lease the terrain to some inhabitants of Baarland, who were also allowed to harvest some trees. In about 1700 the ownership changed. A few years before that a picture was made of the castle.

== Consolidated ruins ==
=== Rediscovery ===
As mentioned above, the ruins of the Hellenburg were rediscovered in March 1958. Of course the archaeologists were curious about the three round towers on one wall depicted by Hildernisse and the 1696 engraving.

=== Tourist attraction ===
The very clear floor plan found at the Hellenburg inspired many castle enthusiasts. They did not like the idea that the foundations would be partly broken out for agriculture, and then lost from sight forever. It was also noted that Zeeland did not have much castles, and Zuid-Beveland had nothing in this respect. An idea to preserve the foundations in the same way that this had been dome at Egmond Castle then came up.

The Zeeland tourism agency liked the idea, and so did many other organizations. During 1958 there was a struggle to preserve the ruins. The municipality of Baarland did not like the idea, and so did most of the inhabitants, who did not see a compelling reason to leave a plot of 40 by 50 m of land unused. Zeeland Province did not want to subsidize the preservation. In the end the Hellenburg foundation Stichting Hellenburg won the struggle, and became owner of the terrain. However, this foundation was not strong enough to do much with the ruins.

By 1977 the ruins of Hellenburg had finally been made presentable. The ruins are currently managed by Het Zeeuwse Landschap, a nature preservation organization.
