= List of havezates in Drenthe =

This is a list of havezates in Drenthe.

Name	Location	Image	Current condition	Type
Huis te Ansen	Ansen, Drenthe		Demolished	Havezate
Batinge	Dwingeloo, Drenthe		Demolished	Havezate
Ter Borch	Eelde, Drenthe		Demolished	Havezate
Dunningen	Between De Wijk, Drenthe and IJhorst, Overijssel		Demolished	Havezate
Huis te Echten	Echten, Drenthe		Good	Havezate

== See also ==
- List of castles in the Netherlands#Drenthe
