= Merckenburg Castle =

Dutch castle

Coordinates: 51°52′42″N 5°05′25″E

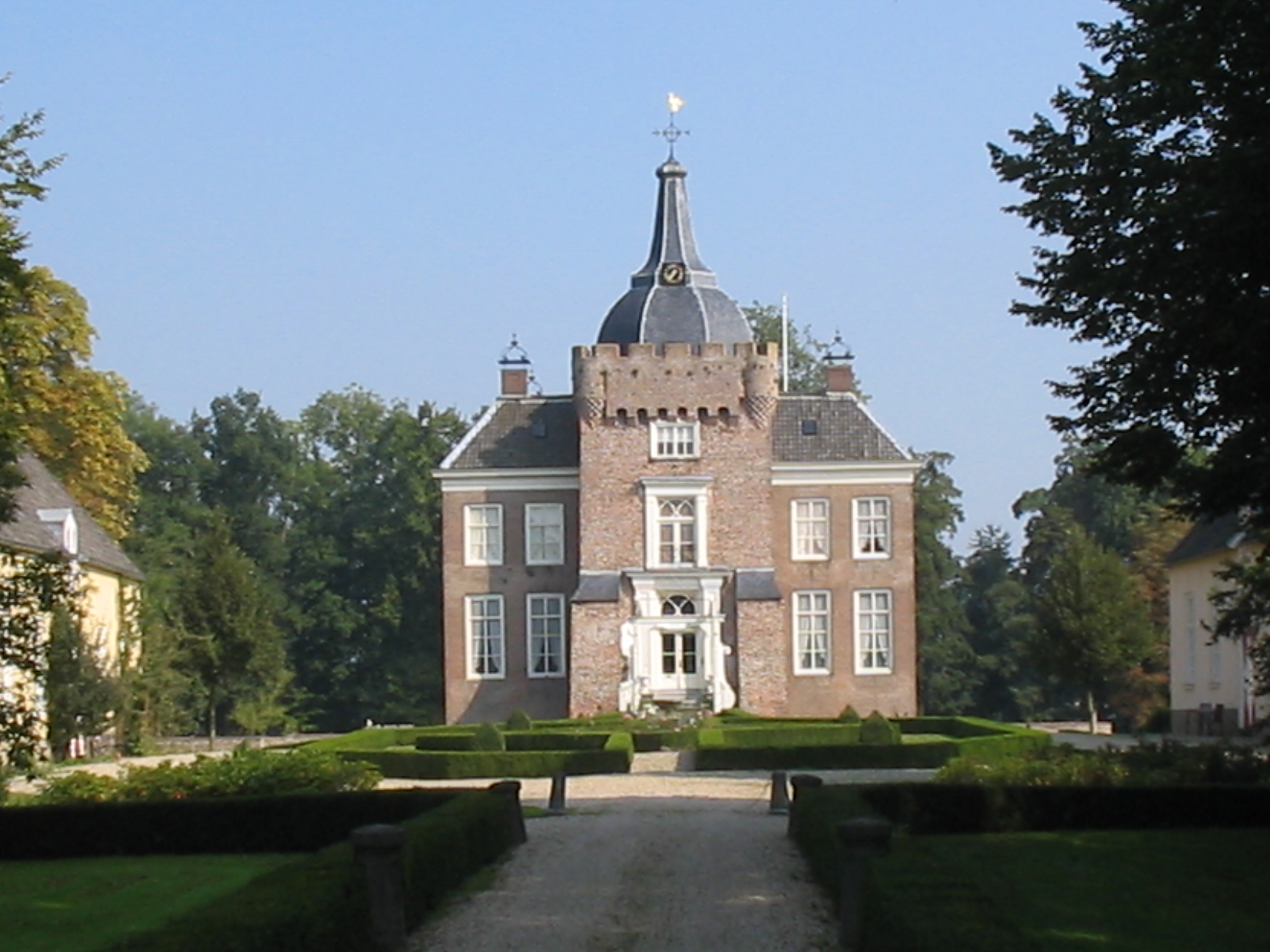
Merckenburg Castle, front view

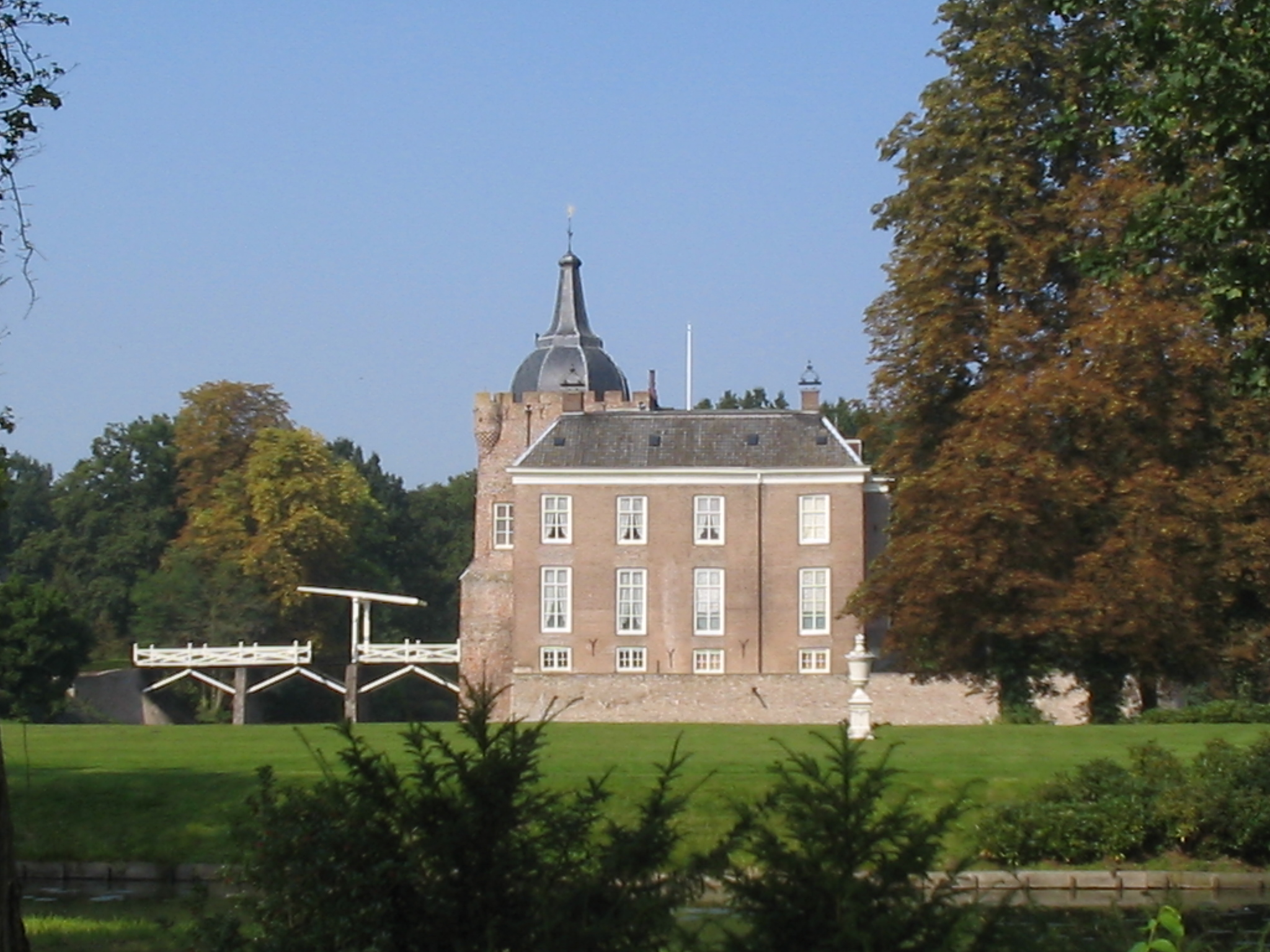
Merckenburg Castle, side view

Merckenburg Castle, also known as Castle Heukelum, is a brick castle in the town of Heukelum in the municipality of West Betuwe in The Netherlands. It dates back to the 13th century. The castle has been destroyed and rebuilt twice. The first time was in the fourteenth century, the second time in the disaster year 1672, when the French blew up the building during the Franco-Dutch War. The castle was restored around 1700, attached to the keep that had not been destroyed by the explosions.

The castle is a square building, approximately 1 km east of Heukelum, located on the Lingedijk in the middle of a wide canal. Since the municipal reorganization in 1986, the castle has belonged to the province of Gelderland, before that to South Holland.

== See also ==
- List of castles in the Netherlands
