= Stapelen Castle =

Castle in the Netherlands

Coordinates: 51.5831°N 5.3242°E

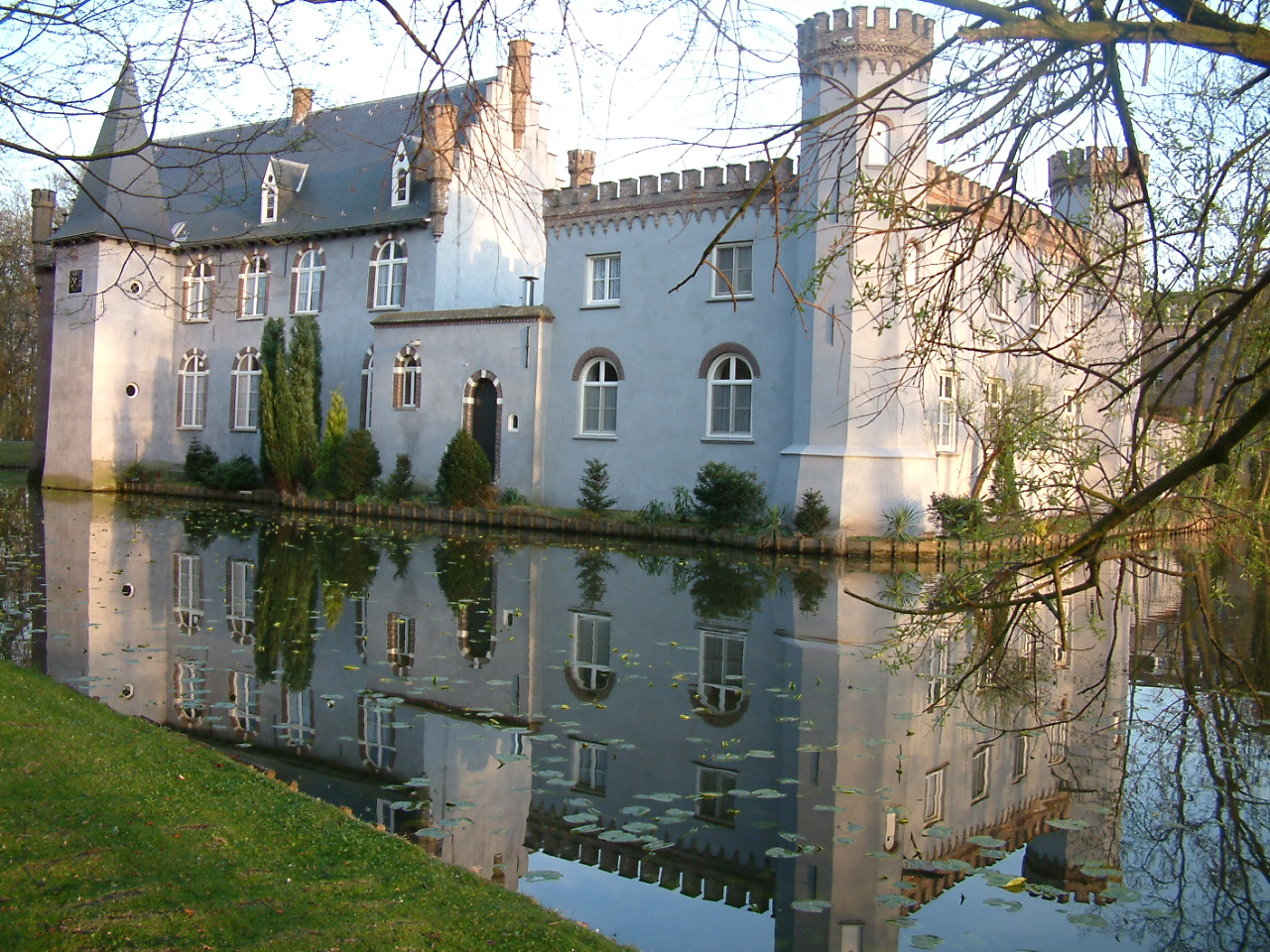
Kasteel Stapelen

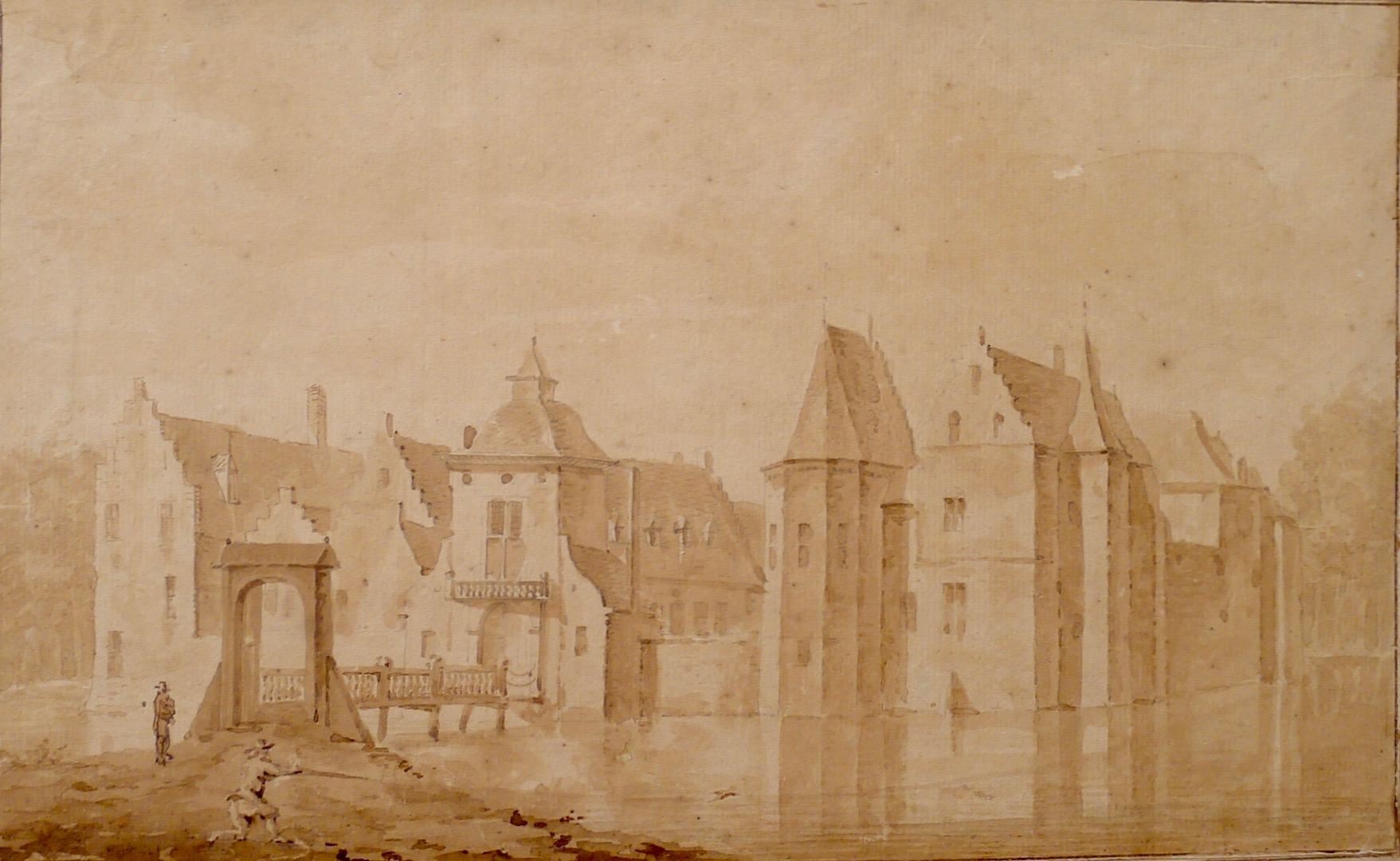
Stapelen Castle in the early 18th century or earlier, drawing by A. de Haen

Stapelen Castle is a castle in Boxtel in the Dutch province of North Brabant. It is known as monastery and headquarters of the Dutch Assumptionists.

The Assumptionist fathers sold the castle on 1 September 2018 and have now transferred it to the Eindhoven property managers Xander van Mierlo. It is not yet clear what function the castle will have. After 104 years the fathers sold the castle Stapelen, which has been in use as a monastery all those years. At present there are still about fourteen Assumptionist fathers in the Netherlands. The Congregation of the Assumptionists is engaged in pastoral care, Catholic inspired journalism, education, corporate apostolate and missionary work in the Netherlands and abroad. The Dutch province of the congregation has been part of the congregation in Paris for a number of years. The Assumptionists still own the buildings at Prins Hendrikstraat 43 and 45, which the fathers would like to demolish for the construction of apartments. It has also been agreed that the cemetery, located in the castle park. will be in use for at least another 50 years to be able to bury the Fathers there permanently. With the permission of the Bossche bishop, the fathers removed the chapel of Saint George in the castle from honorary service.

== The name of the castle ==
The name of the moated castle is a mystery. Different etymological dictionaries give different meanings for the word stack. It could mean, among other things, foundation or depot, but also column or church tower. Stapelen was called de Stapelo in 1134, so the name is already old, but a good explanation seems to be hidden in the mists of time.

== History ==
Stacking Castle was built around the 13th century by a member of the family of Randerode. The first mention of it dates from 1293 (see: list of lords and women of Boxtel ). The manor Boxtel was initially a loan from the County of Loon . At the beginning of the thirteenth century, Stapelen Castle came into the possession of Willem I van Boxtel (van Randerode), married to Aleidis van der Aa, widow of Hendrik van Cuijck, and later to her child Justina van Diepenbeek. He was knighted by the Duke of Brabant. Different sexes followed that of Van Boxtelon. Van Merheim and Van Ranst were the successive owners of Stapelen. In the sixteenth century Stapelen came to the Van Horne family; this remained the case until 1763. In 1645 the castle was described by Filips van Leefdael as a large out-of-town castle with wide, beautiful canals . After 1763 the estate passed to the Van Salm-Kyrburg family . Frederick III of Salm-Kyrburg, however, was guillotined in Paris in 1794 as a result of the French Revolution . The ancien régime was disbanded and Stapelen Castle was forfeited. In 1810 it was still described asvery large and of old fashioned order, and in 1815 the castle was sold. The castle was finally bought through various owners by a councilor from 's-Hertogenbosch, Hendrik Mahie.

He had the castle completely renovated in the neo-gothic style. This gave it a castle-like design that corresponded to a 19th-century ideal image. However, there was also criticism, as it was rebuilt in the then admired English style and thus acquired a look that did not correspond to what was customary for castles in the Netherlands.

After her husband's death, the widow Mahie continued to live in the castle. She wanted to leave, but then the castle had to become a monastery. Advertisements were therefore placed in newspapers, to which the Assumptionist fathers responded. They moved into the castle around 1915 and it was therefore a monastery until it was sold in September 2018. Now it is privately owned, what the current owner has with it is still unknown.

Initially, the castle also housed a minor seminary, but due to the large influx of seminarians, expansion was necessary and in 1927 a new building was placed in the castle garden, close to the castle, under the name 'Apostolic School St. Theresa', also known as called Mission House St. Theresa. It became an enormous building for this area, but it lost its function as a minor seminary around 1970. This building is currently in use as an apartment building.

== Architecture ==
The southern part of the castle complex still contains many old elements. The knights' hall, for example, still has the original fourteenth-century hood and a barrel vault . The stone walls of the buildings of this wing were created in the 16th century. The octagonal tower on the east side dates from the Middle Ages, as do the two towers on the west side of the main building and the chapel on the south side. In this chapel is another altarpiece from about 1600 that contains the weapons of the Van Horne family.

The north side of the castle was almost completely renovated in the nineteenth century. During excavations in the context of the restoration of 1968, foundations of former stables were found at the place where car boxes were erected in 1957 against the west wall . It turned out that even more buildings stood in front of the current south wing, so that the courtyard must have been significantly smaller in the past. The south wing turned out to be founded on a sandbank, but the north side was built on raised ground. It is therefore possible that the south wing was located directly on the river Dommel in the first years of its existence.

== Legend ==
There is a legend associated with Stacking Castle. Shortly before the year 1400, priest Eligius, who celebrated mass in the chapel, spilled white consecrated wine on the altar cloth. A red stain appeared on this cloth, which could no longer be washed out. The priest kept this matter a secret until his deathbed, where he told it to the then lord of the castle Willem van Merheim. This was given permission by the clergy to show the cloths to the people, from which the procession of the Holy Blood eventually emerged in Boxtel, which is held annually on the first Sunday after Pentecost.
