= Hamtoren =

Remains of Den Ham castle in Vleuten in Utrecht

Coordinates: 52°6′20″N 4°59′44″E

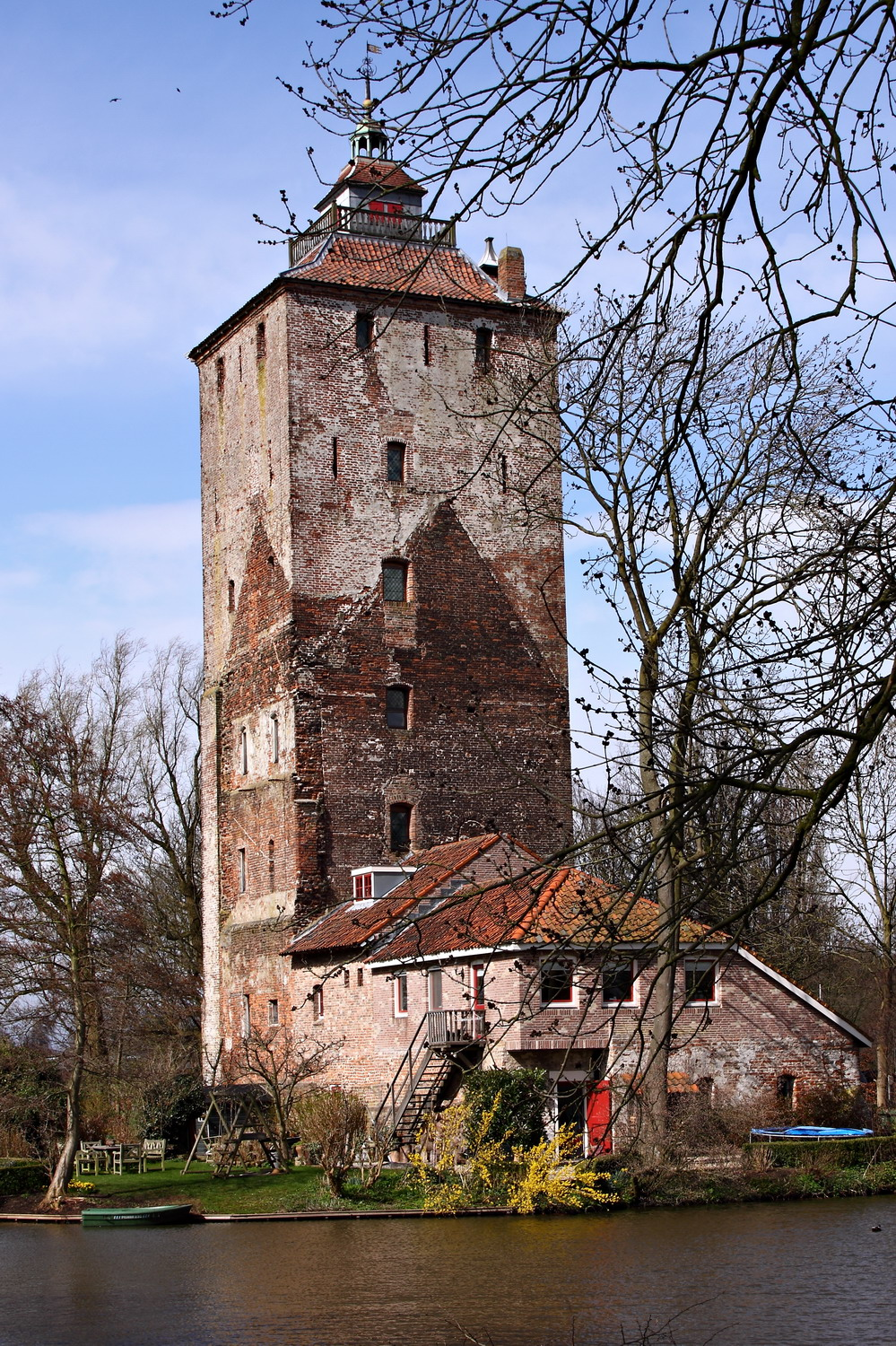
The Hamtoren

The Hamtoren is the remains of the historical Den Ham Castle in Vleuten. The tower is located north of the Utrecht–Rotterdam railway line, on an old road connecting Harmelen and Utrecht.

== History ==
The castle is mentioned for the first time in a 1325 charter. Construction of a residential tower may have started around 1260, on a site near a curve of the Oude Rijn. This curve created a defensible position, allowing the tower's owner control of the surrounding area.

Den Ham saw battle multiple times. Notably, the tower was besieged for 12 weeks in the Utrecht war of 1481–83, which resulted in its plundering and partial destruction. It was soon rebuilt and a second tower was added. In 1536 the States of Utrecht recognized Den Ham as a ridderhofstad ("knightly manor") and admitted its residents to the Knighthood. In 1642 the castle's gatehouse was renovated. In 1711 the Hacfort family took possession the castle through marriage, keeping it until 1811. Around 1872 the castle, by now fallen into disrepair, was largely demolished, leaving a single 15th-century tower as well as the foundation of the original tower. The tower was restored roughly a century later, and again in 2020 when key architectural components such as garderobes were restored.

The tower is currently privately owned, and is only rarely open to visitors. In 2016 the tower was purchased by Bas Kennis, musician with Blof, with the intent of transforming it into a studio.

The tower, encircled with a moat, counts six floors and a basement where medieval beams have been preserved. Its brick walls are roughly 1.5 meters thick and stand roughly 27 meters high. A turret with observation deck is placed on the roof, making the total height approximately 35 meters.

== See also ==
- Huis te Vleuten

== Sources ==
- Den Ham op Kastelen in Utrecht
- J. H. Huiting en J. Kamphuis, Den Ham, in: B. Olde Meierink, G. van Baaren en R.G. Bosch van Drakestein et al. (red.) (1995), Kastelen en ridderhofsteden in Utrecht, Matrijs, Utrecht, pp. 225-230, ISBN 9035450728
- S. Krul et al. (red.) (2004), Achter Utrechtse gevels, aflevering 1, Waanders, Zwolle, pp. 10-15, ISBN 9040016747
