= Laag-Keppel =

- Small city
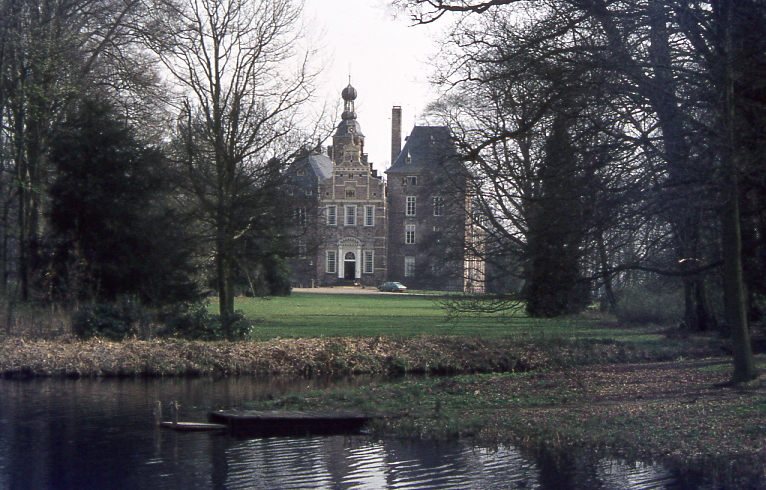
- Keppel Castle

- Coat of arms

- Location in the province of Gelderland Laag-Keppel (Netherlands)
- Coordinates: 51°59′51″N 6°13′21″E
- Country: Netherlands
- Province: Gelderland
- Municipality: Bronckhorst

Area
  - Total: 0.39 km^{2} (0.15 sq mi)
- Elevation: 12 m (39 ft)

Population (2021)
  - Total: 455
  - Density: 1,200/km^{2} (3,000/sq mi)
- Time zone: UTC+1 (CET)
  - Summer (DST): UTC+2 (CEST)
- Postal code: 6998
- Dialing code: 0314

Laag-Keppel is a small city with city privileges (since 1404) between Doetinchem and Doesburg in the Netherlands. Situated along the main thoroughfare between these two larger cities, there is heavy traffic moving through at all times. Laag-Keppel has an estimated 455 residents. However, the peaceful neighbourhood this has provided has attracted many young couples looking to raise children in this forested area, surrounded by farmlands. Thus the current population of Laag-Keppel is a diverse mix of many ages, though ethnic and religious diversity is hard to find, as most immigrants move to large cities.

Laag-Keppel features a number of historical buildings, foremost being the medieval Keppel Castle and windmill-watermill combination, both recently restored, and kept in good condition.

== Gallery ==
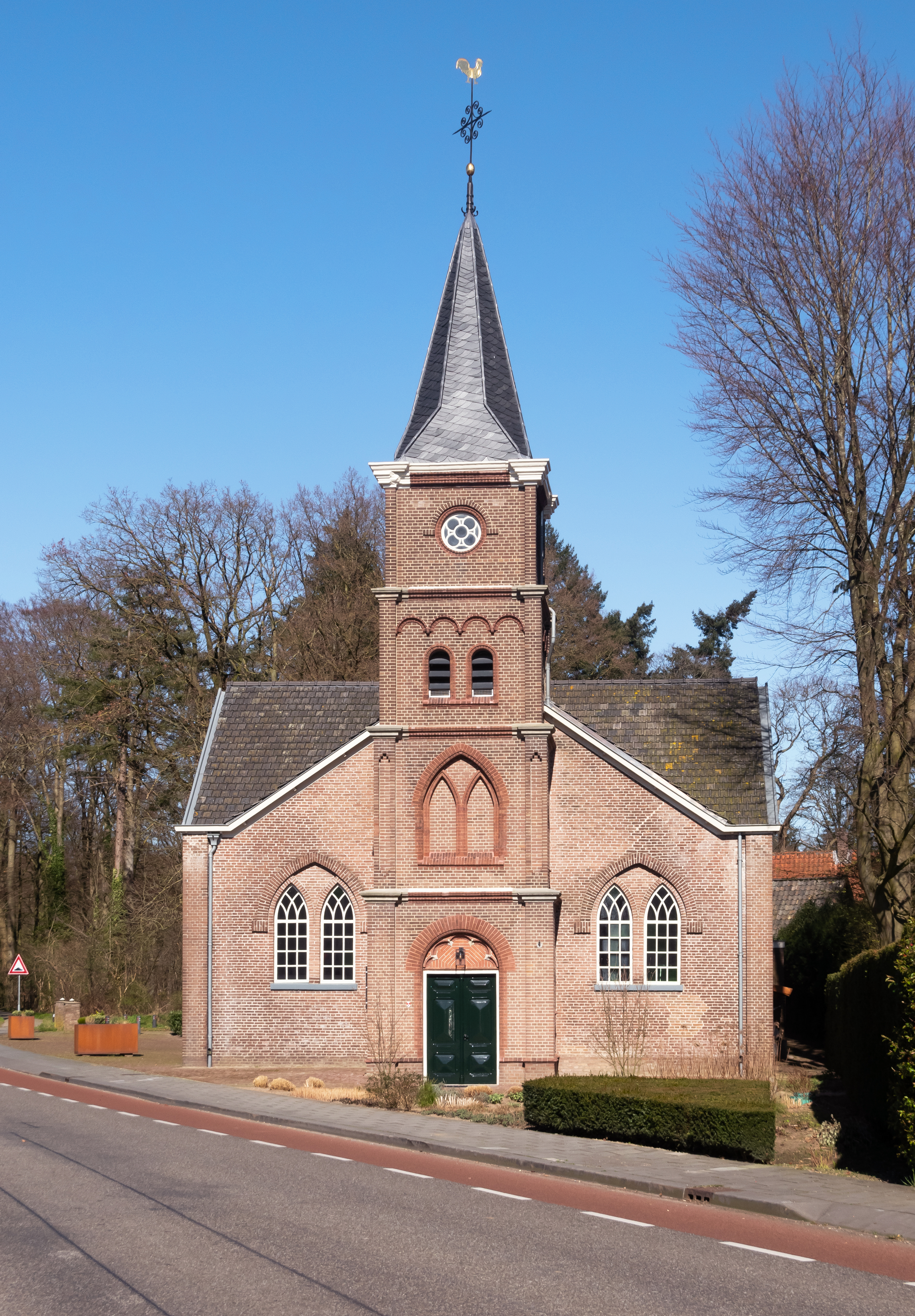
Laag-Keppel, church

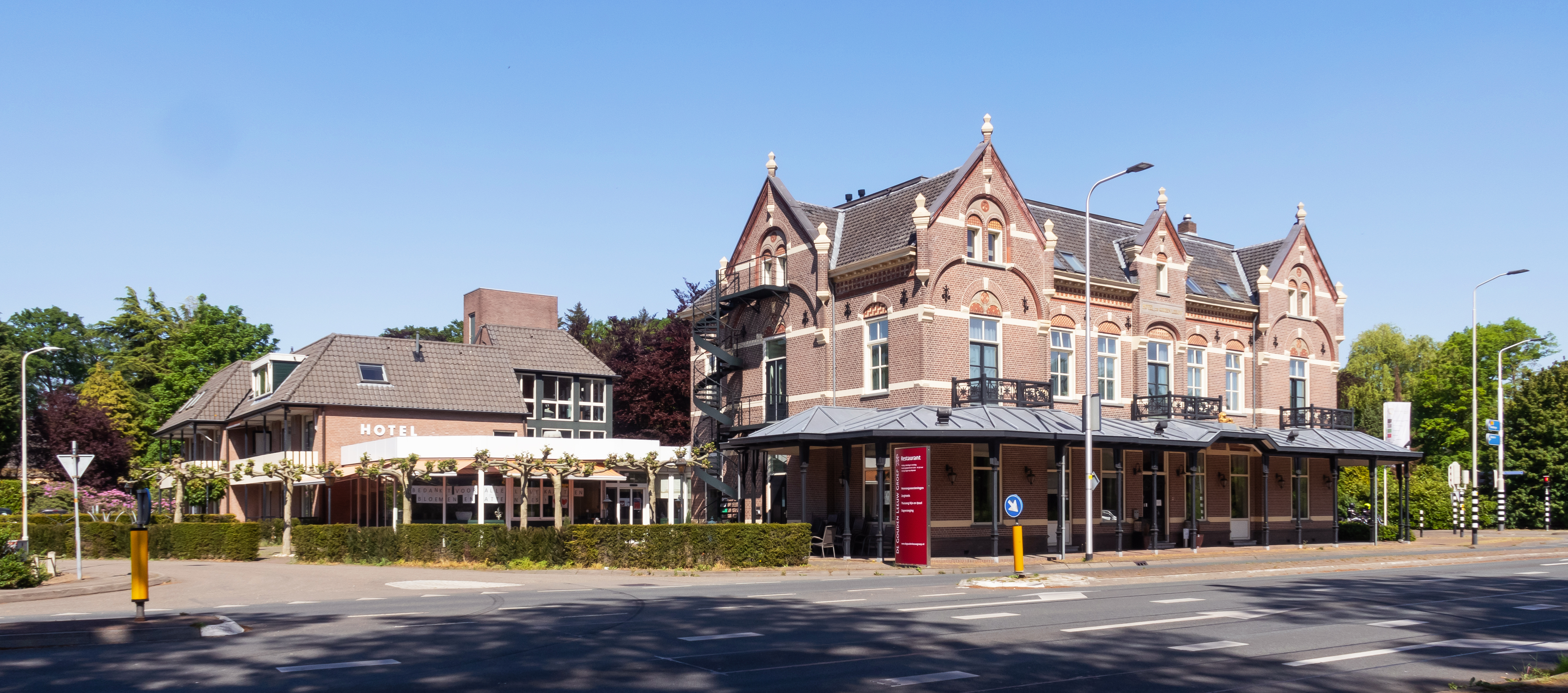
Laag-Keppel, hotel
