= Jemeppe Castle =

Castle in Wallonia, Belgium

- Hargimont (Belgium)
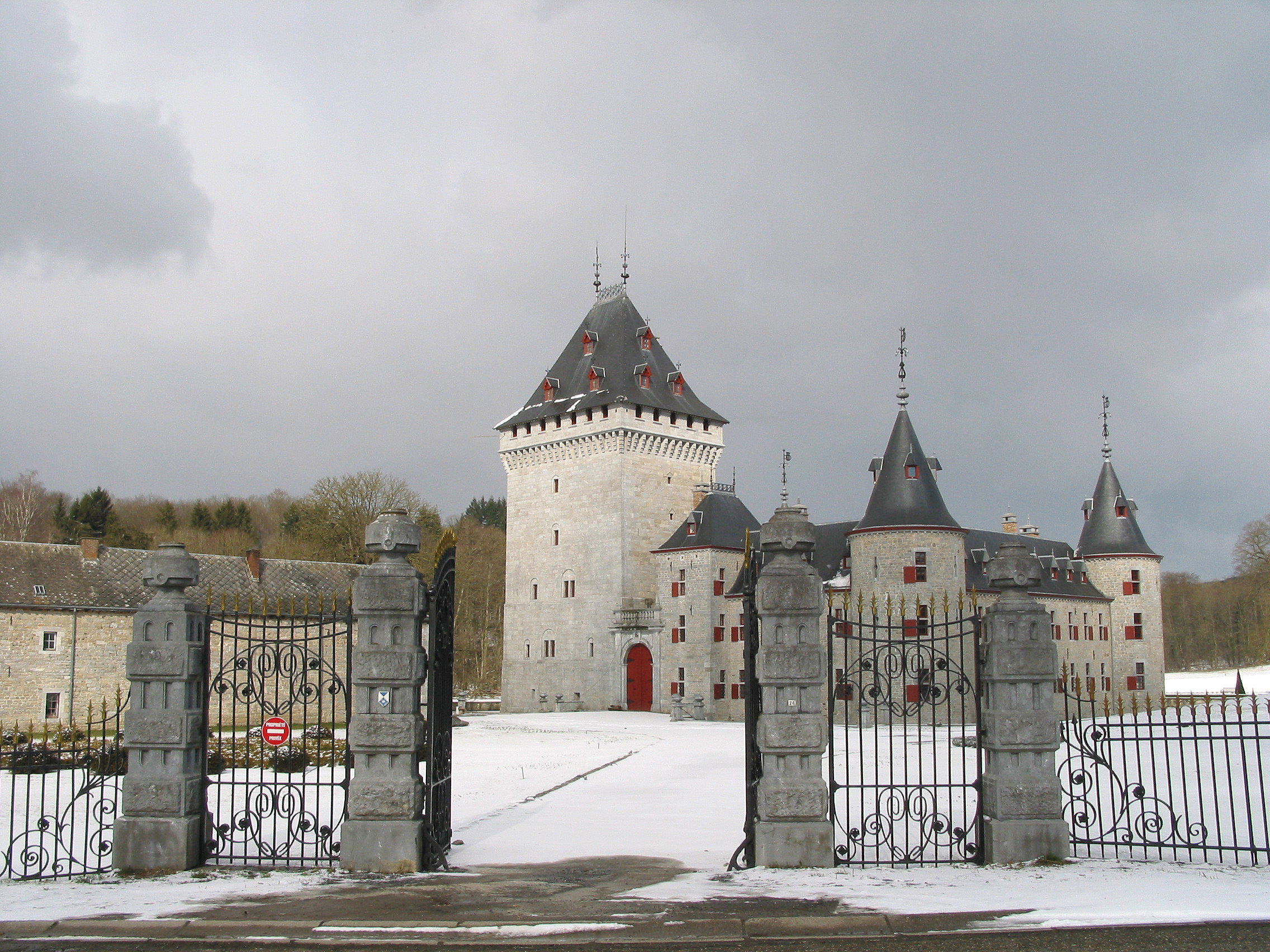
- Winter view

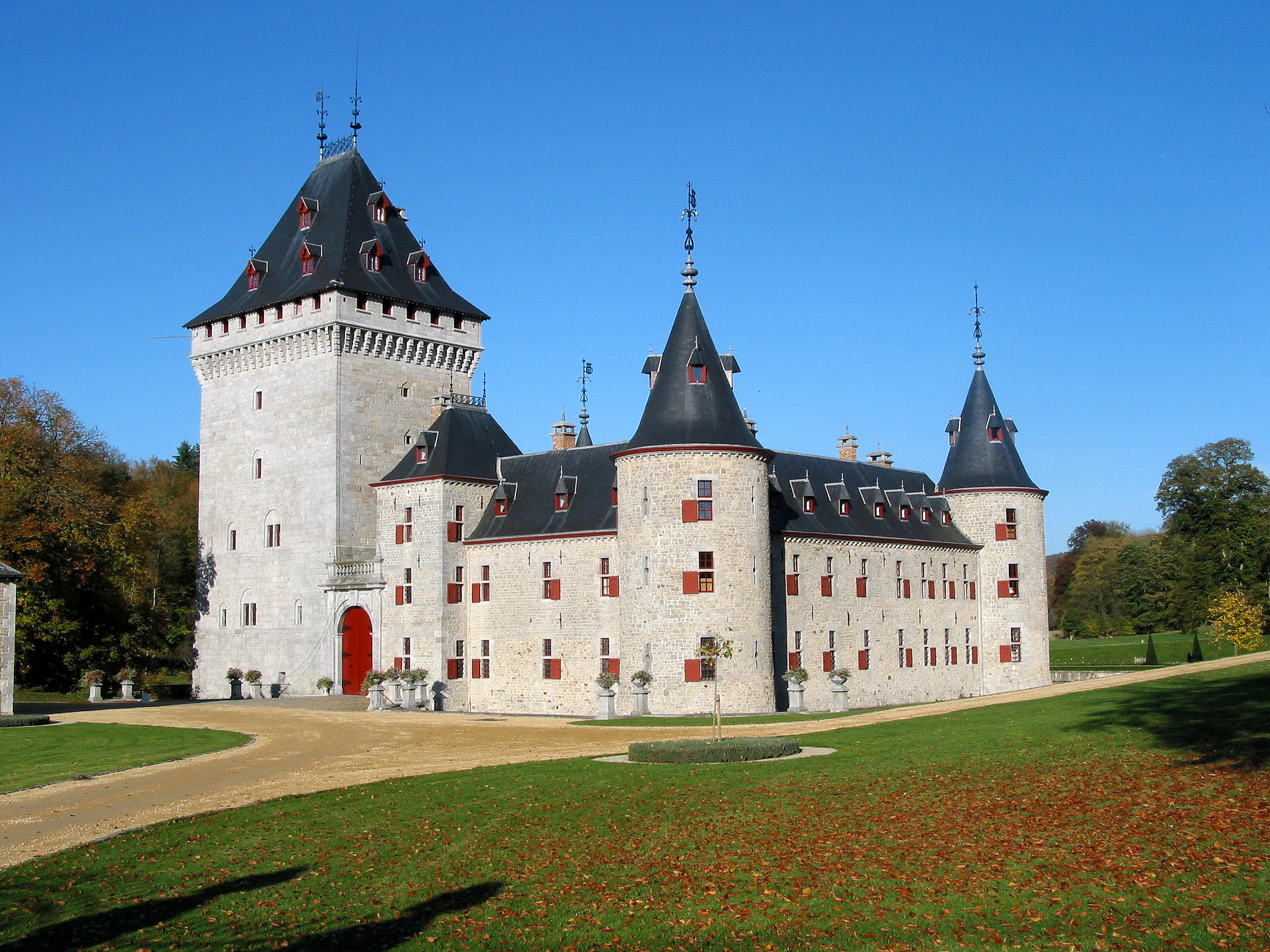

Site information
- Type: Castle
- Open to the public: Yes

Location
- Coordinates: 50.1862°N 5.3127°E

Jemeppe Castle, also known as Hargimont Castle (French: Château Jemeppe or Château d'Hargimont), is a castle in Hargimont, now part of the municipality of Marche-en-Famenne, province of Luxembourg, Wallonia, Belgium.

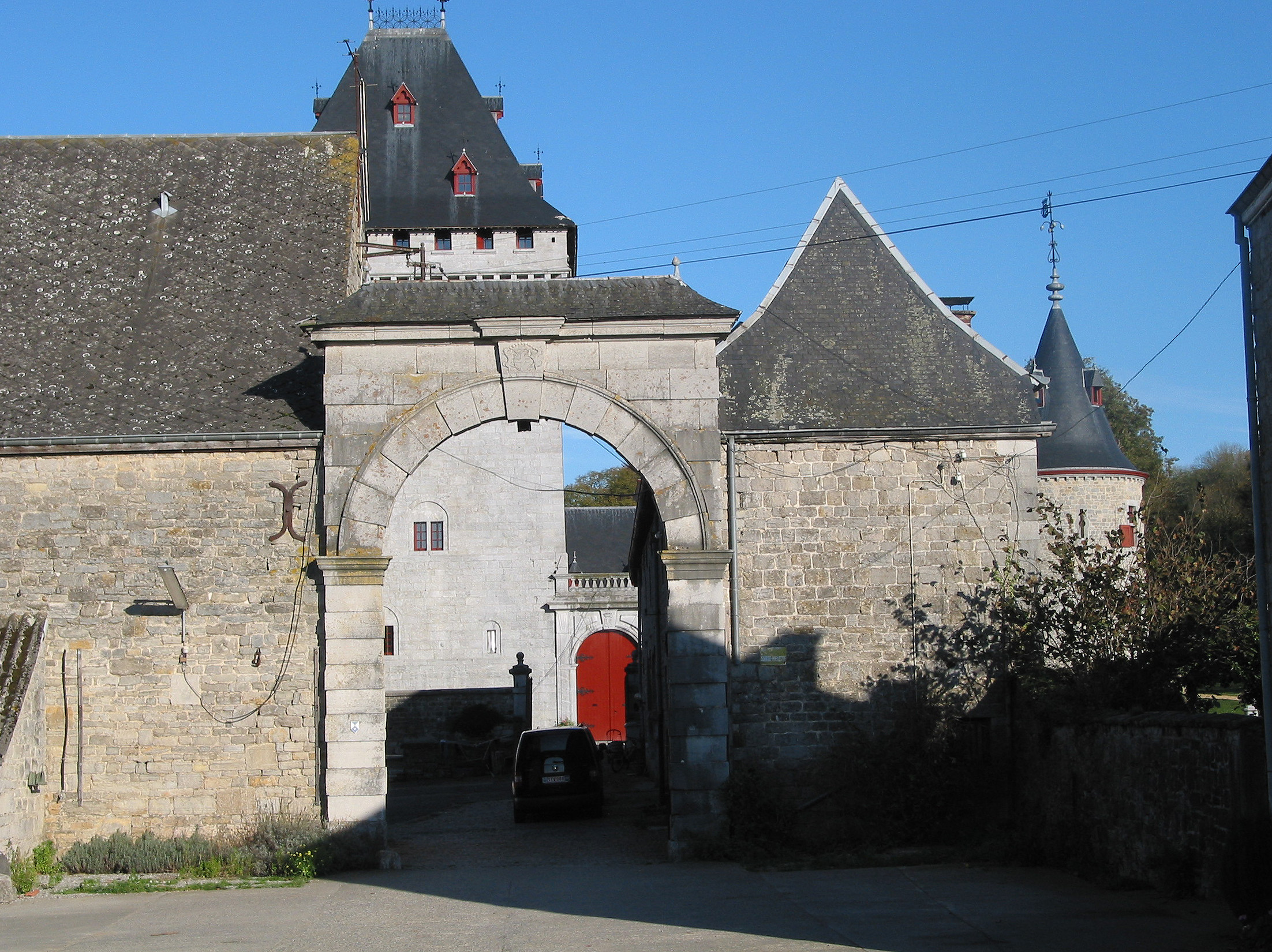
Farm gateway

== History ==
It is known that during the Roman era a fortified villa was established in the region. The present castle is however of medieval origin.

In the Middle Ages the manor of Jemeppe consisted of only a few buildings, surrounded by marshland and the river Hedrée. These offered little protection against the ruling families of Namur and Luxembourg, who had been fighting to gain control of the territories of Durbuy and La Roche since the 12th century. A fortified house was built here in the early 13th century, later replaced by Jean d'Ochain with a donjon protected by moats.

Originally, the donjon had five storeys. Access to the upper and lower floors and the two cellars is via the ground floor, through the only door in the tower. The first two floors were designed as living quarters, and the two floors above that were of a more basic design and used as staff quarters, for storage, and to provide shelter for inhabitants from the manor of Jemeppe seeking refuge.

The donjon remained in the d'Ochain family until 1616, when the heiress, Catherine de Jemeppe, married Raes d'Ans, sieur de Velroux. It was probably Raes d'Ans, shortly after acquiring the property, who extended the fortified tower with living quarters into a square castle building. The wings of the castle, double moat and farmstead also date from that period. The wings were modernized in 1739 and 1748, and more windows were added. Restoration work was also carried out at the beginning of the 19th century, including on the gallery and the gatehouse next to the donjon.

In 1838, the castle passed to the de Sauvage-Vercour family. Between 1865 and 1875, Adrien de Sauvage-Vercour had extensive renovation work carried out on the castle. Attics and pitched roofs were added to the wings. He also commissioned an unknown architect to build a "crowning apex" on the donjon, and the old flat roof was replaced by the present steep roof. After the work was completed, weathervanes in medieval style were added to the tower roofs. One of the vanes still bears the de Sauvage-Vercour monogram.

Arms of d'Ochain

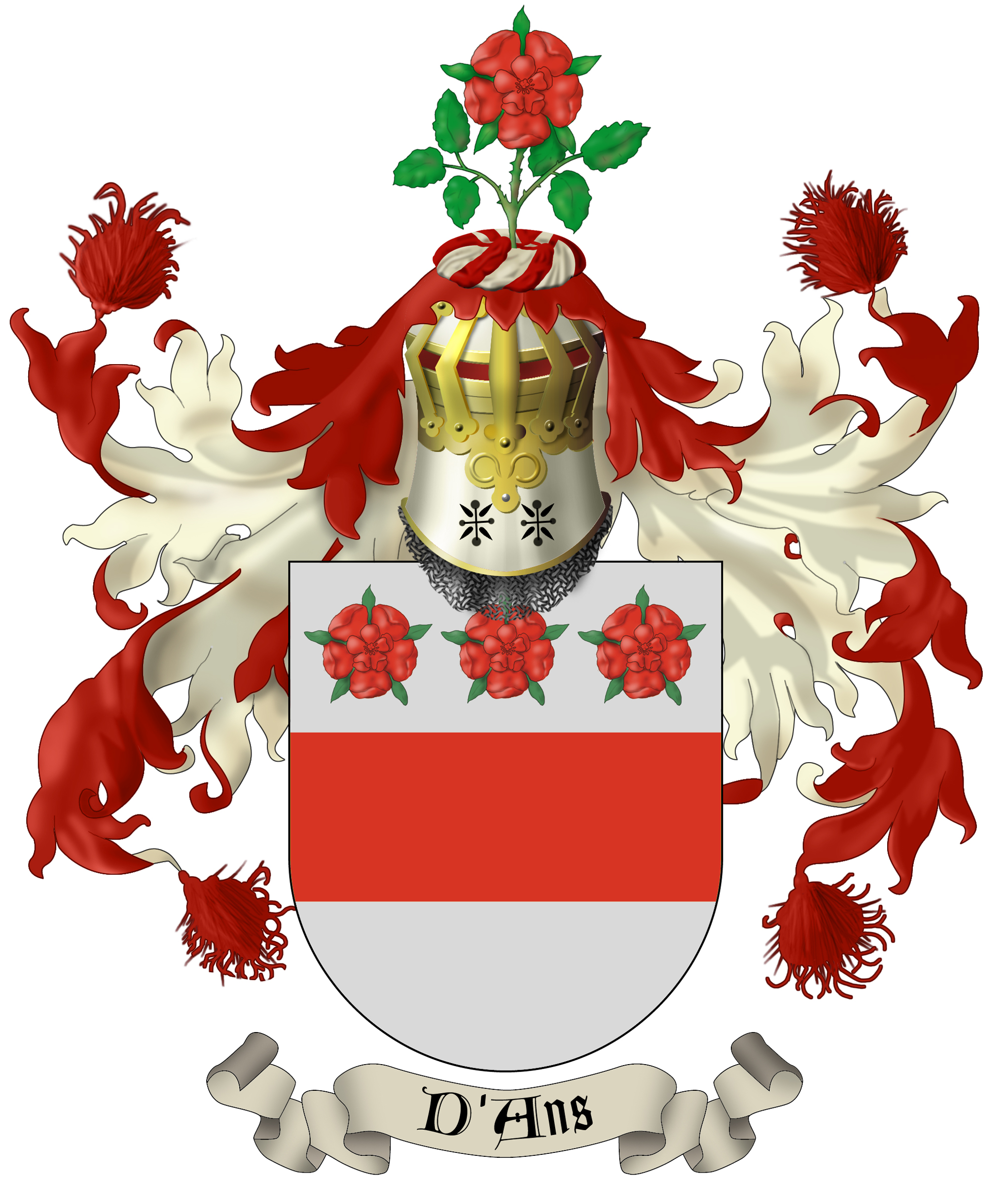
Arms of d'Ans de Velroux

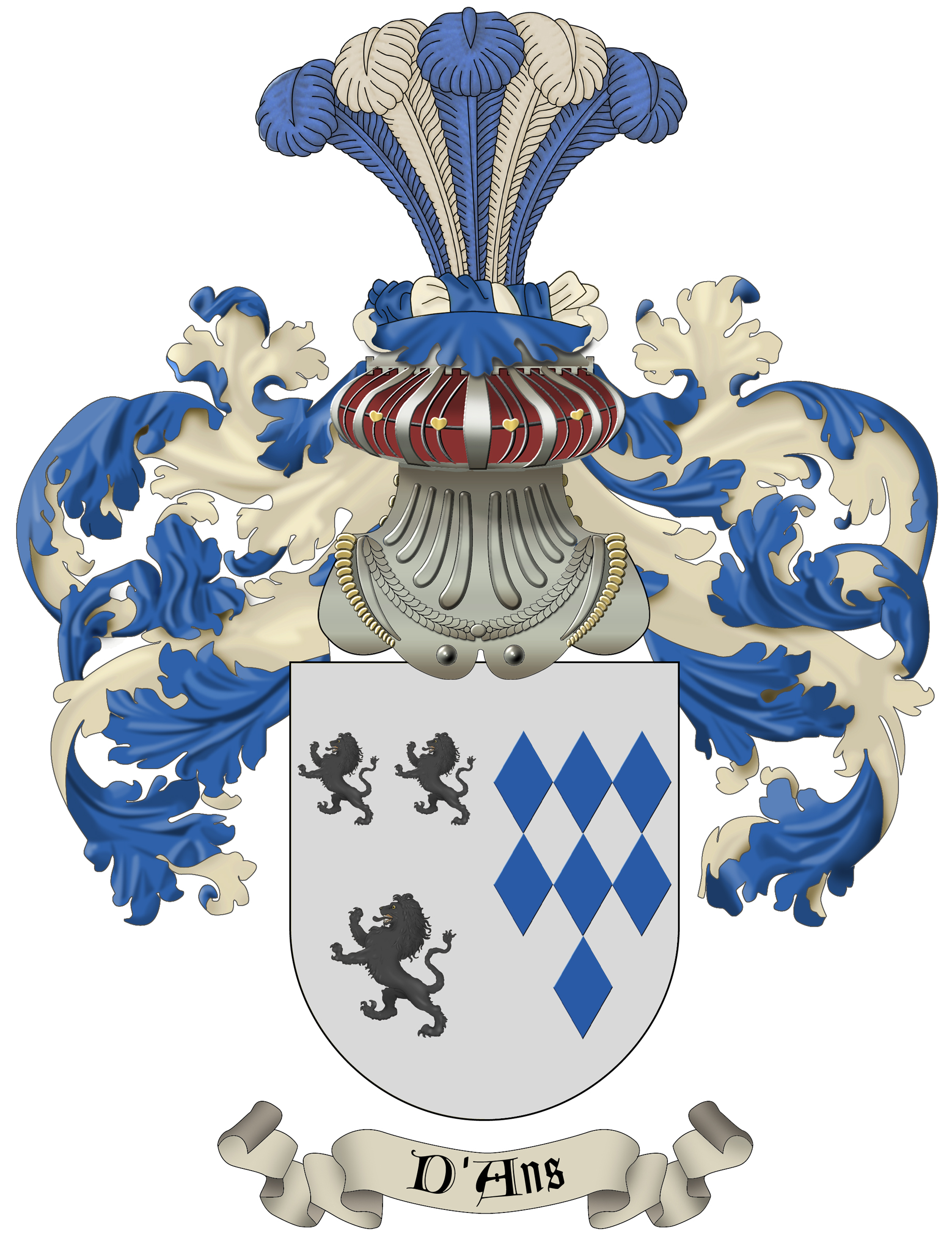
Arms of d'Ans de Freloux

== See also ==
- List of castles in Belgium
- Jemeppe Castle www.castles.nl
