= Baarland =

- Village
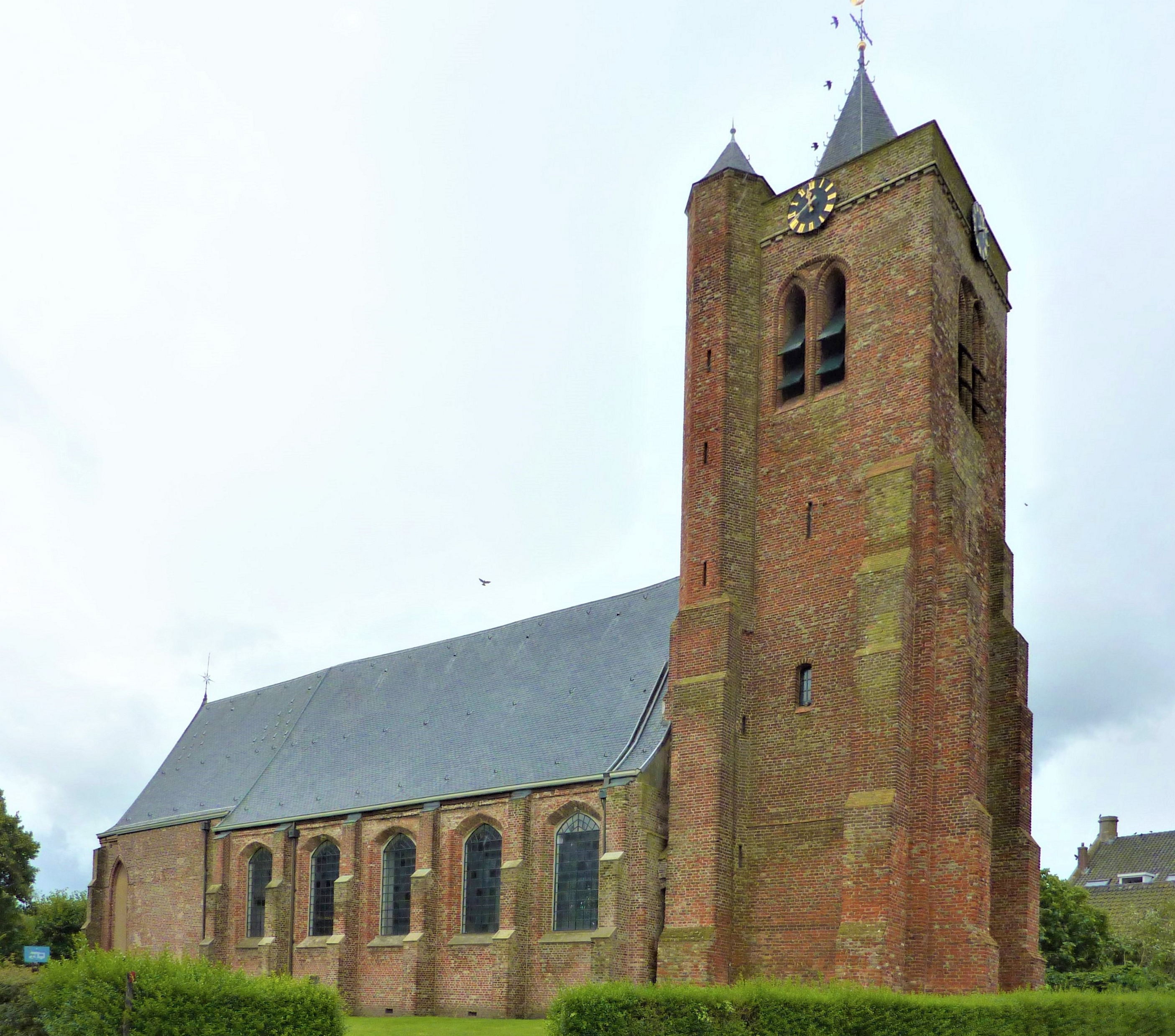
- Protestant parish church of Sint Maarten

- Flag Coat of arms

- Location in the province of Zeeland in the Netherlands Baarland (Netherlands)
- Coordinates: 51°24′30″N 3°53′6″E
- Country: Netherlands
- Province: Zeeland
- Municipality: Borsele

Area
  - Total: 8.32 km^{2} (3.21 sq mi)
- Elevation: 0.4 m (1.3 ft)

Population (2021)
  - Total: 600
  - Density: 72/km^{2} (190/sq mi)
- Time zone: UTC+1 (CET)
  - Summer (DST): UTC+2 (CEST)
- Postal code: 4435
- Dialing code: 0113

Baarland is a village in the Dutch province of Zeeland. It is a part of the municipality of Borsele, and lies about 21 km east of Middelburg.

== History ==
The village was first mentioned in 1295 as Bae(r)land, and means "barren land". Baarland is a road village which developed in the Middle Ages on a ridge. In 1014, a North Sea flood resulted in the creation of the Oost-Borsele island. The hamlets on the island formed the Heerlijkheid Baarland. In 1295, an army of the County of Flanders landed in Baarland to revenge the plundering of Floris V, Count of Holland and Zeeland. After a long combat, the local armies managed to drive back the Flemish, however Baarland had to be rebuilt.

The Dutch Reformed church dates from the mid-14th century. It was damaged by fire in 1532. The church was reduced in size during a 1774 restoration.

Slot Baarland is a castle which was first mentioned in the 13th century. It was expanded and remodelled in the 17th century. In 1923, it was sold by auction and started to deteriorate. The North Sea flood of 1953 destroyed the gardens around the castle. In 1970, it was restored, and a wall with four towers was added.

Only ruins remain of Hellenburg Castle. The castle was built in 1312, but was destroyed by a flood in 1477. In 1958, the remains of the foundation of the castle were discovered.

Baarland was home to 562 people in 1840. In 1924, a railway station was built on the Goes to Hoedekenskerke railway line. The station closed down in 1934. The railway line has been reused as a museum line with steam locomotives. Baarland was flood during the North Sea flood of 1953.

On 26 October 1944, the Allied forces tried to land at Baarland and attack the Germans from the rear. Despite heavy losses and strong resistance, the Allies managed to liberate the area. Almost half the houses in Baarland were severely damaged, and the village was evacuated.

Baarland used to be a separate municipality. In 1970, it was merged into Borsele.

== Gallery ==
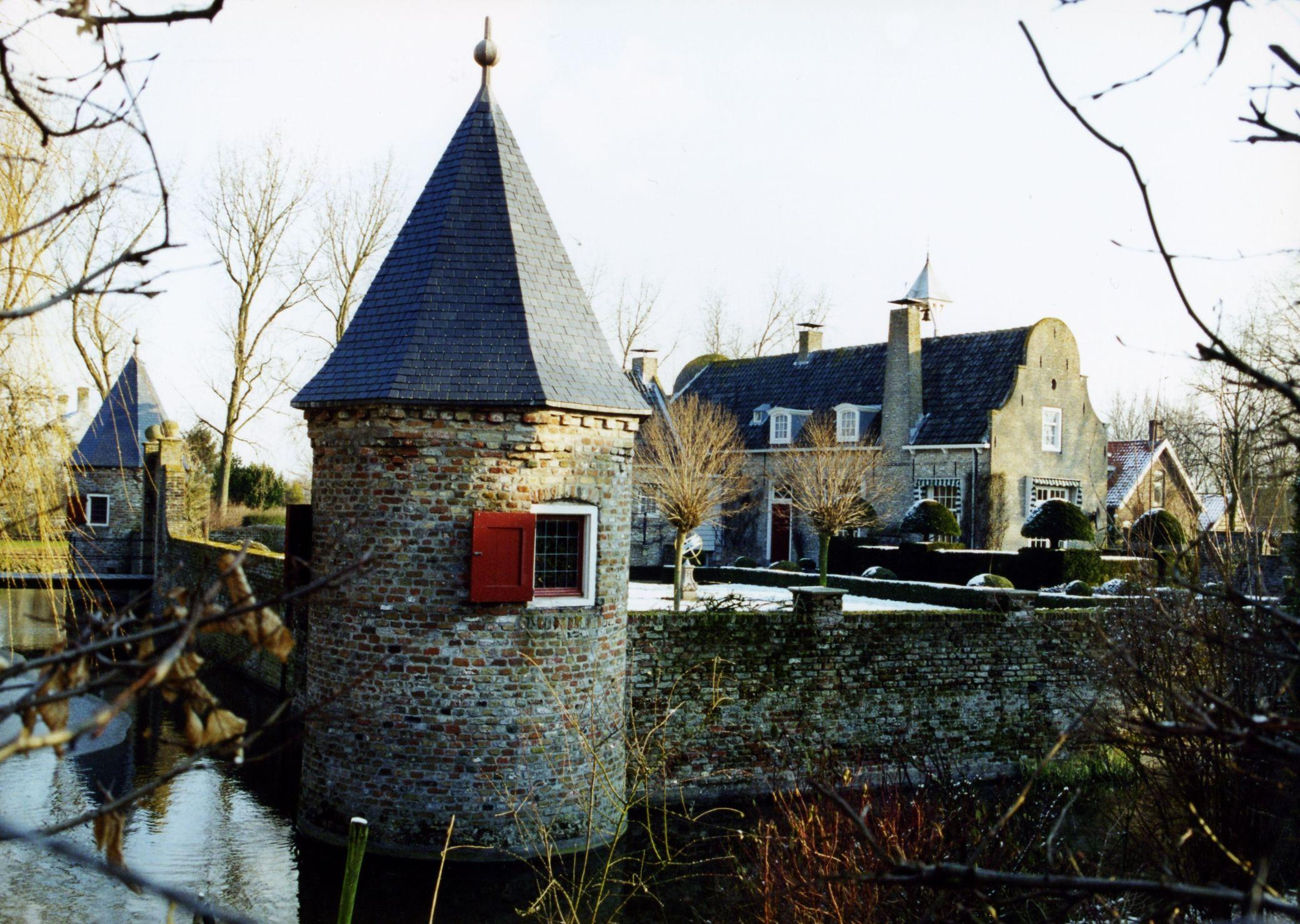
Baarland castle

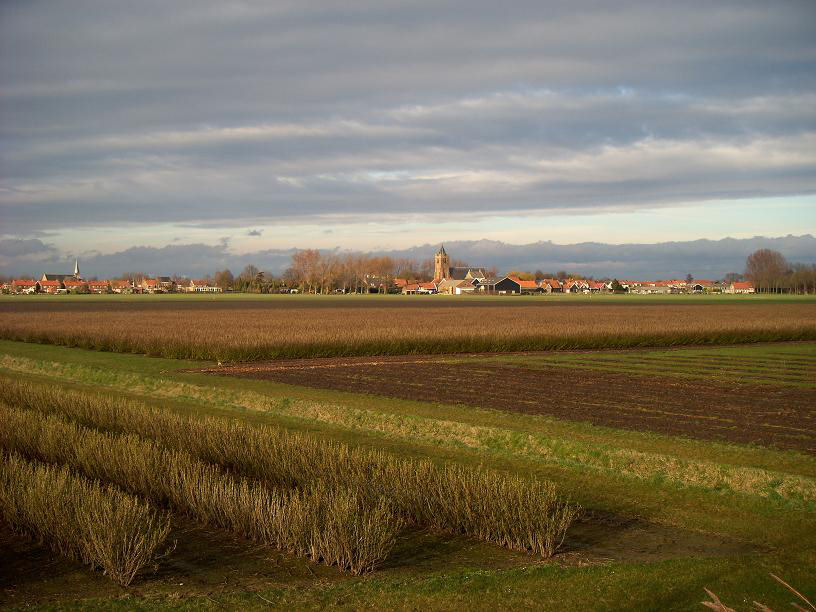
View on Baarland

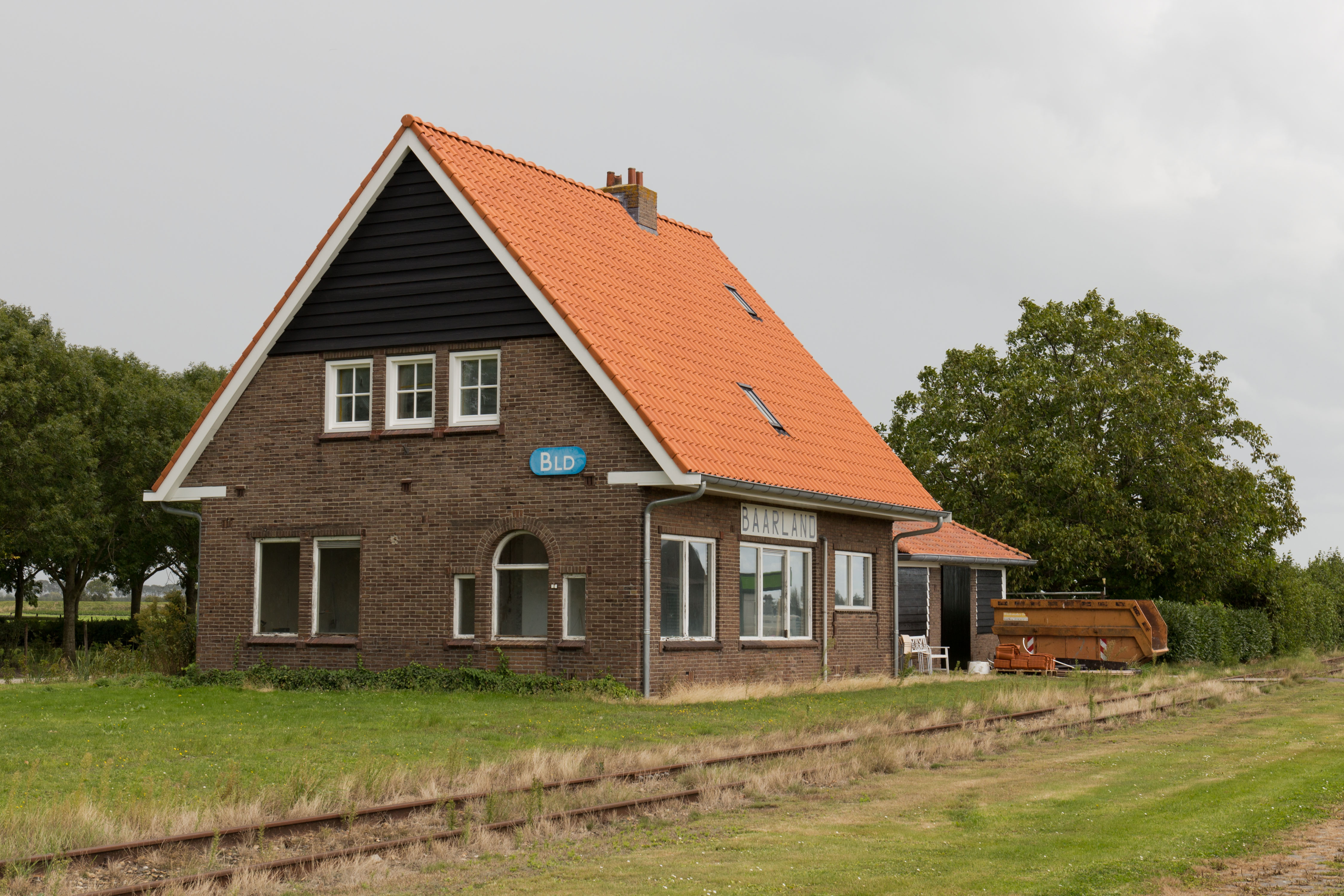
Former railway station

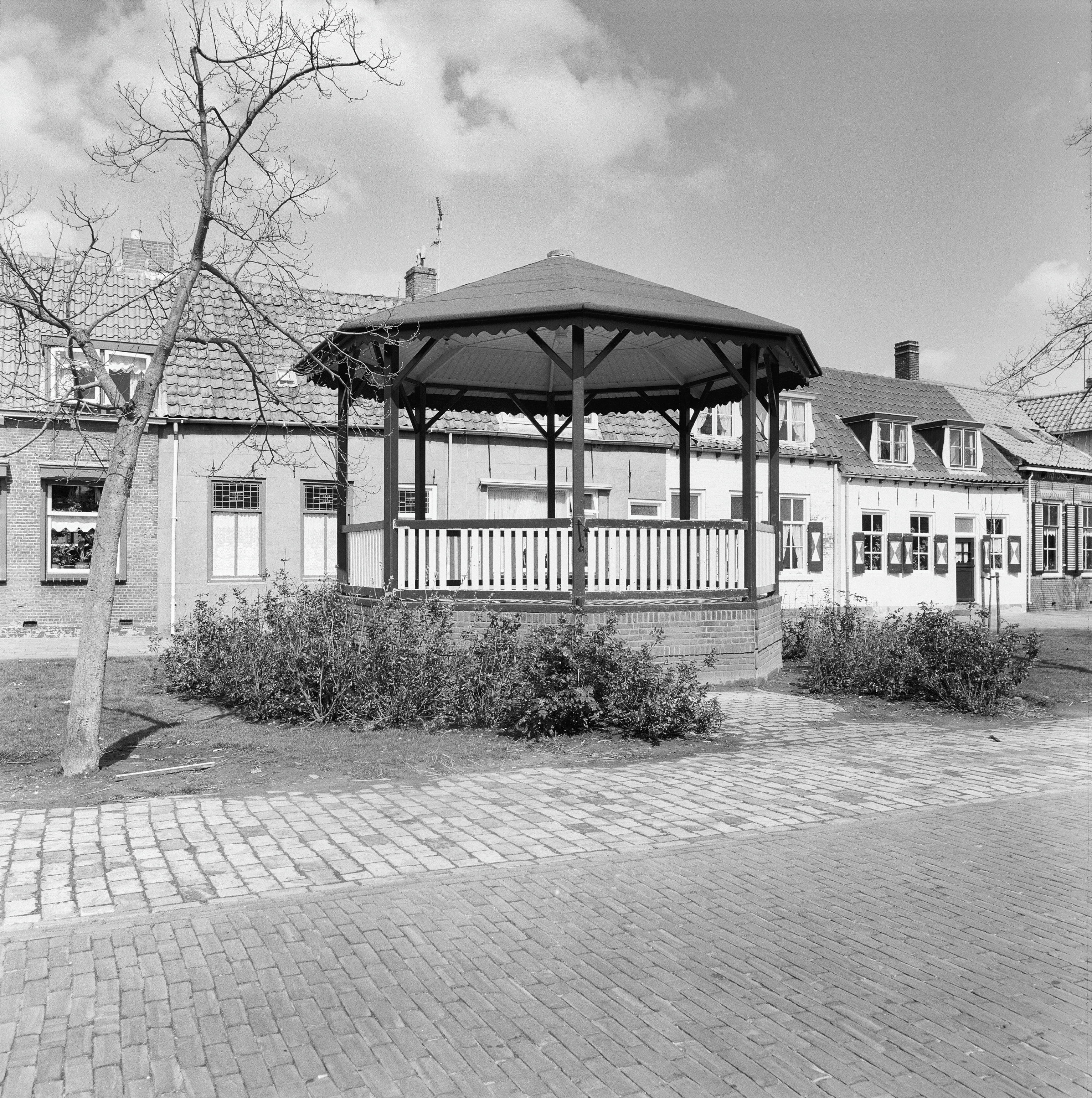
Bandstand (1984)
