= Haaften =

- Village
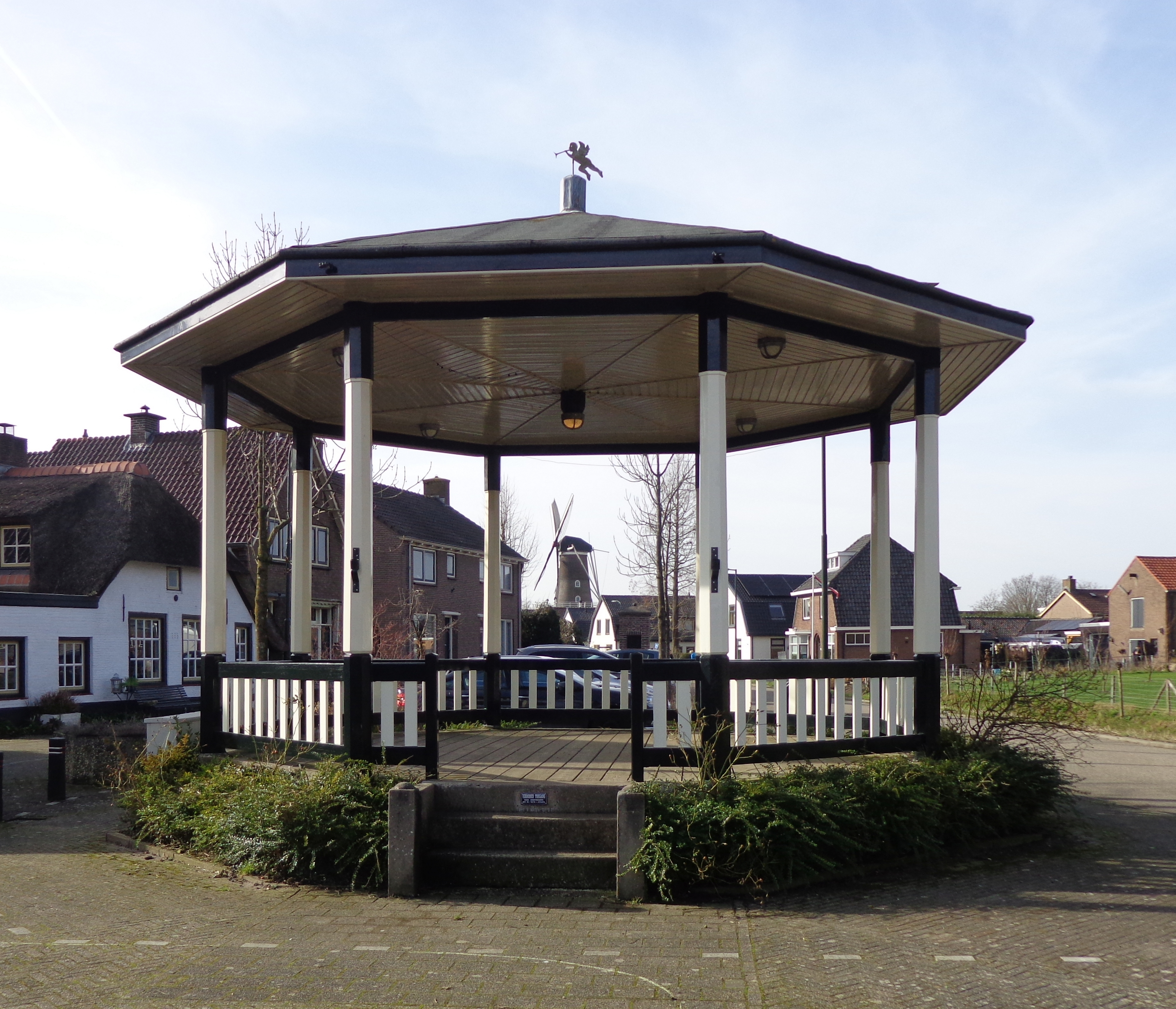
- Bandstand in Haaften

- Coat of arms

- Location in the Netherlands Haaften (Netherlands)
- Coordinates: 51°49′1″N 5°12′42″E
- Country: Netherlands
- Province: Gelderland
- Municipality: West Betuwe

Area
  - Total: 8.52 km^{2} (3.29 sq mi)
- Elevation: 5 m (16 ft)

Population (2008)
  - Total: 2,850
  - Density: 335/km^{2} (866/sq mi)
- Time zone: UTC+1 (CET)
  - Summer (DST): UTC+2 (CEST)
- Postal code: 4175
- Dialing code: 0418

Haaften is a village in the Dutch province of Gelderland, on the northern shore of the river Waal, about opposite Zaltbommel. It is a part of the municipality of West Betuwe, and lies about 25 km south of Utrecht.

From 1818 to 1977 Haaften was the main village and seat of the town hall of the eponymous municipality, which also comprised the smaller villages of Hellouw to the west and Tuil to the east, all on the northern bank of the river Waal. On 1 January 1978 it was merged with the Neerijnen municipality of which it formed the westernmost part. In 2019 Neerijnen merged with several other municipalities to form West Betuwe.

== History ==
It was first mentioned in 1160 as Haften. The etymology is unclear. Haaften developed into a stretched out esdorp which was surrounded by the dike of the Waal on three sides. Castle Goudenstein was built by the van Haeften family and was first mentioned in the 13th century. In 1672, the castle was destroyed by the French, and only the corner tower remained. In 1969, the tower was restored.

In 1840, Haaften was home to 992 people. The Dutch Reformed Church was built in 1851. The grist mill De Blauwe Reiger was built in 1856. It was decommissioned in 1949 and sold in 1952. The new owner restored the wind mill in 1955. Since 1975, it is owned by the municipality.

== Gallery ==
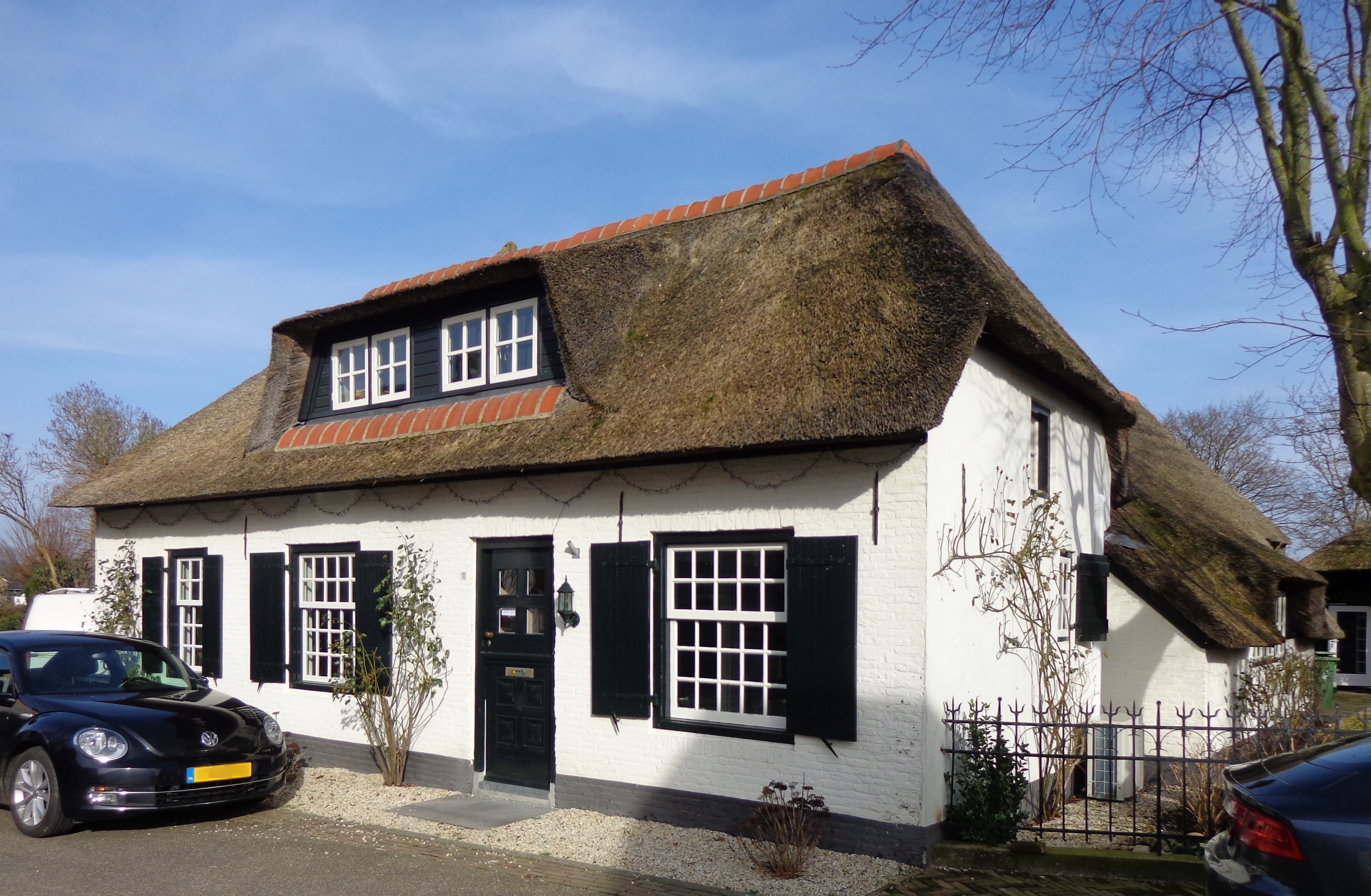
House in Haaften

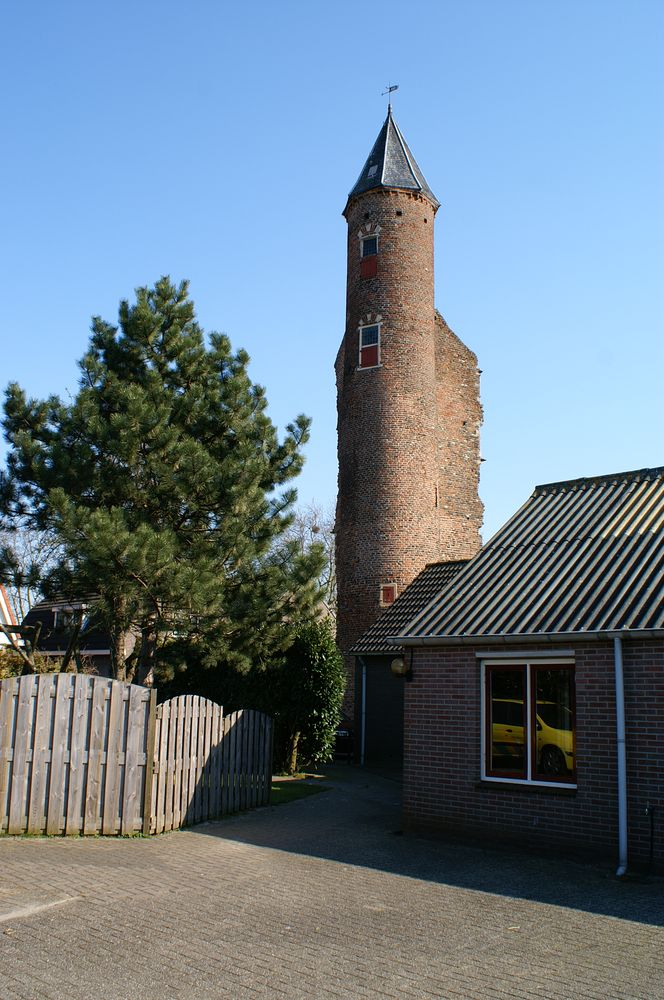
Remains of castle Goudenstein

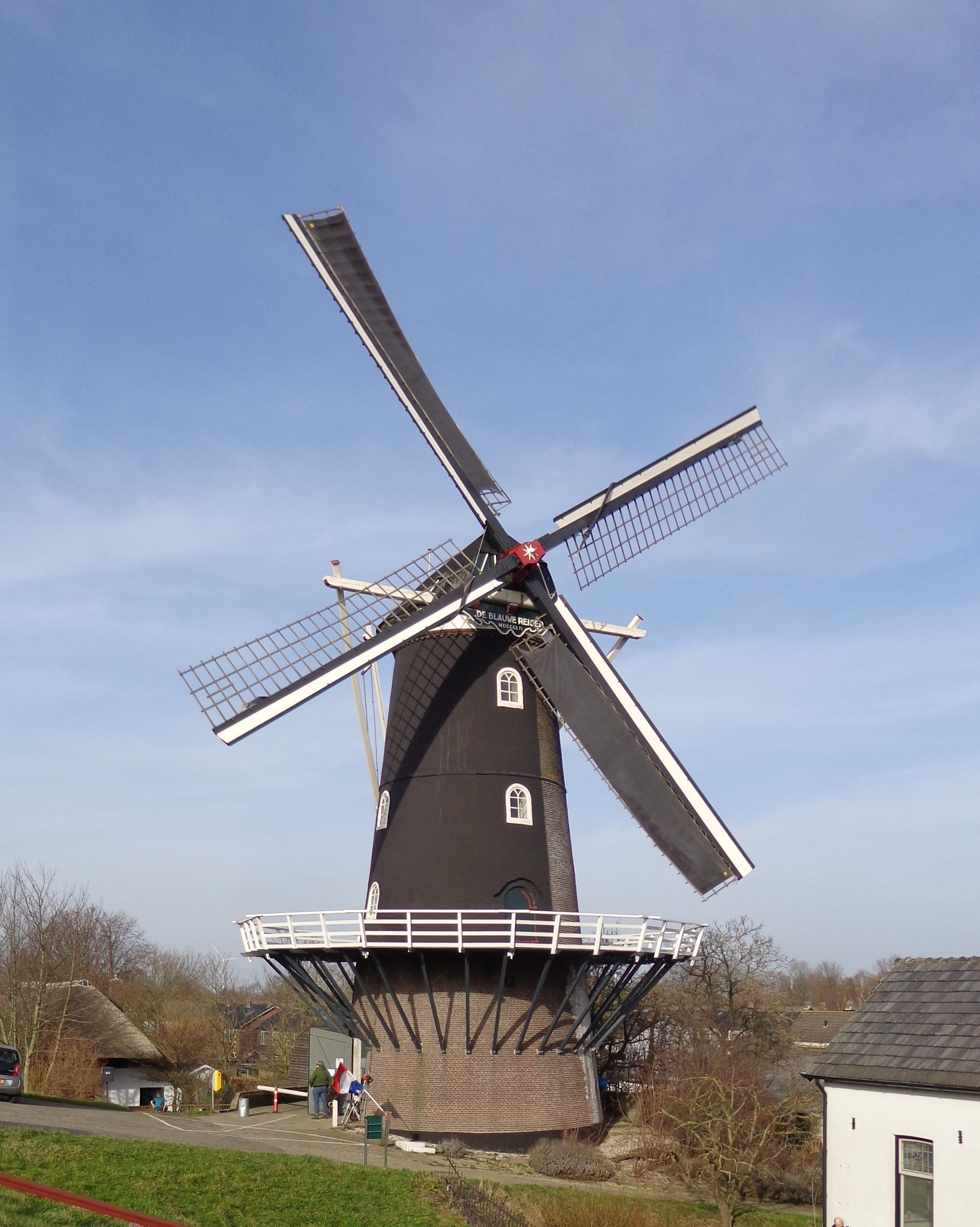
Windmill De Blauwe Reiger

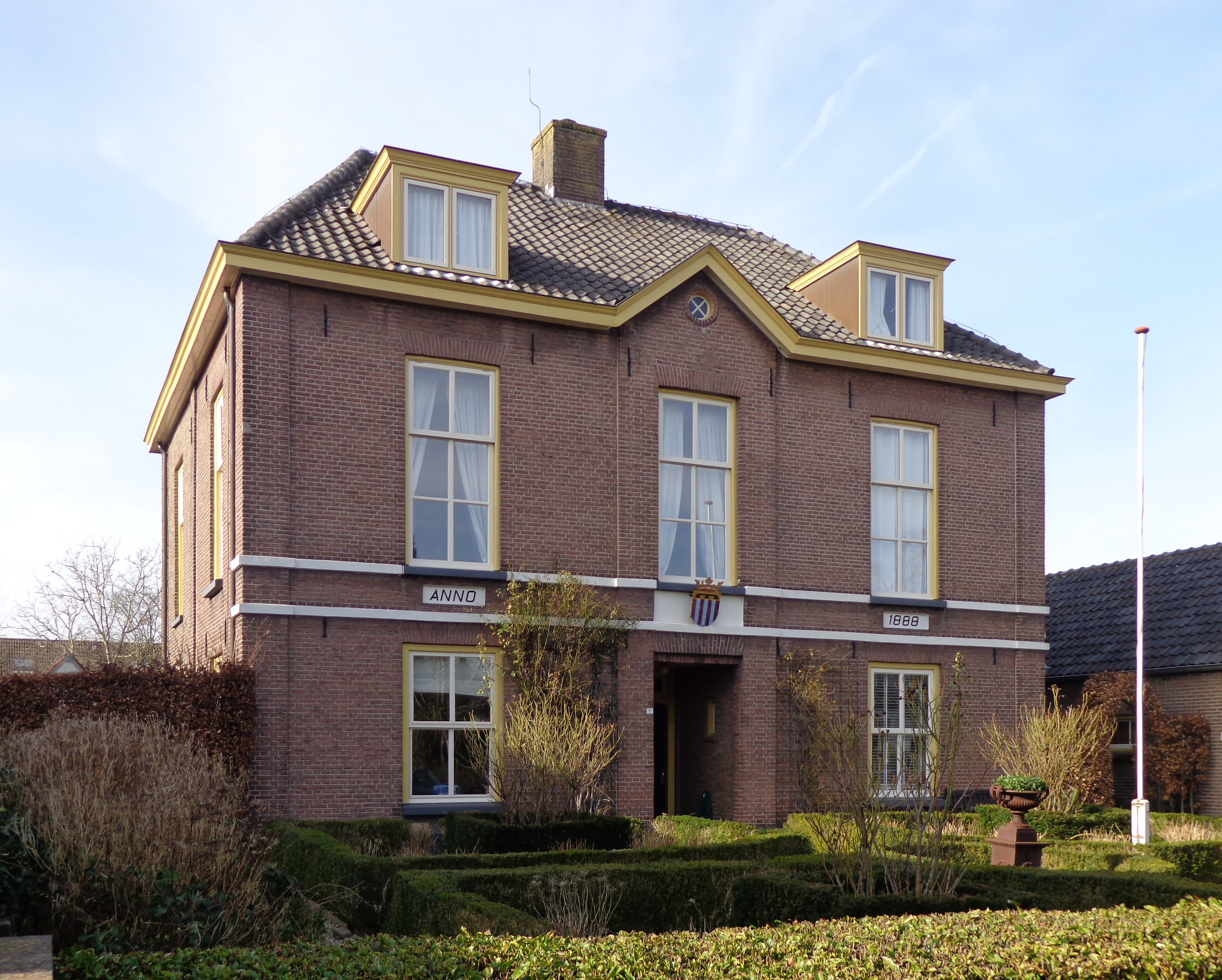
House in Haaften
