= Rheden =

- Municipality
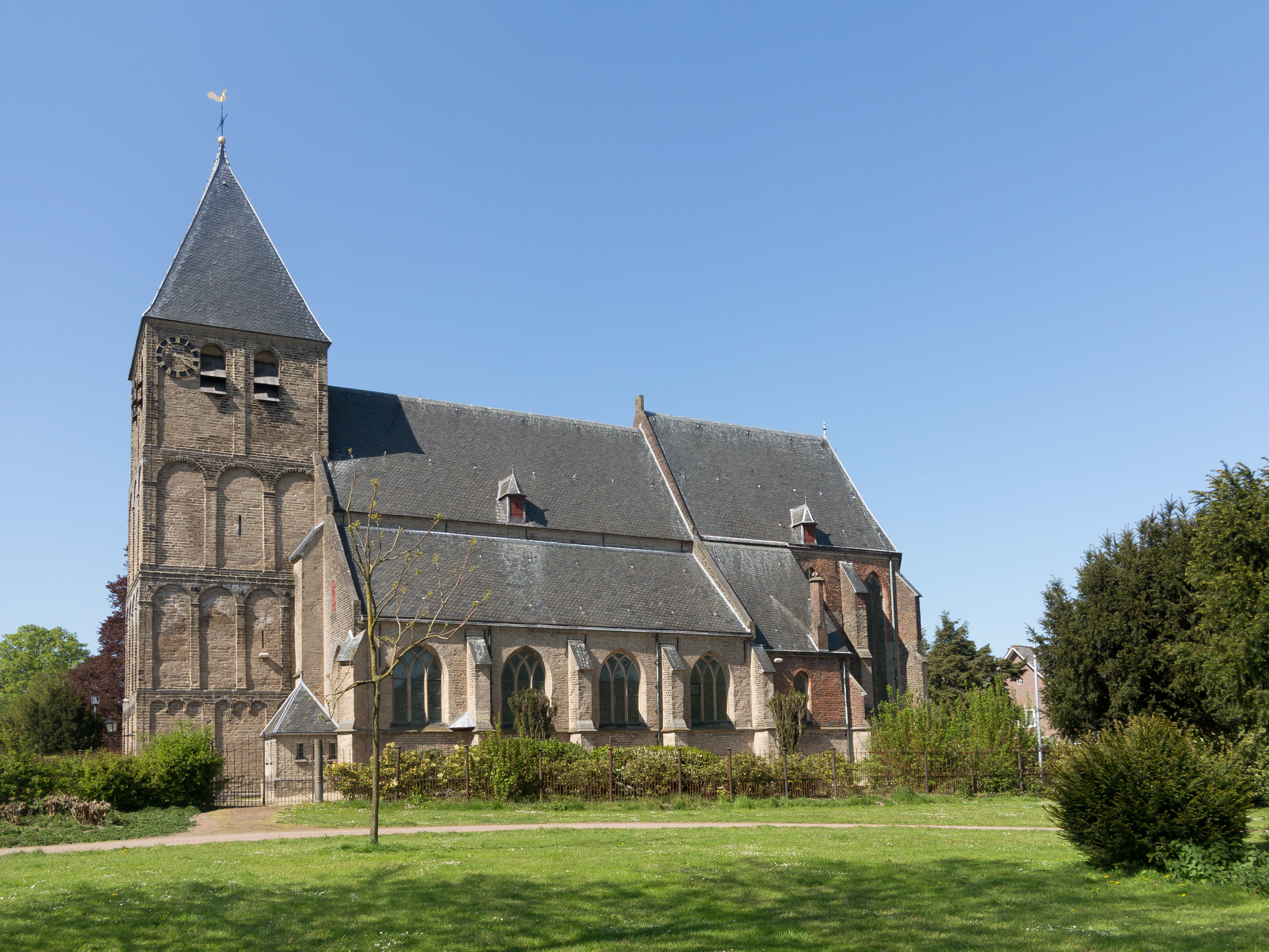
- Church in Rheden

- Flag Coat of arms

- Location in Gelderland
- Coordinates: 52°1′N 6°3′E
- Country: Netherlands
- Province: Gelderland

Government
  - Body: Municipal council
  - Mayor: Carol van Eert (PvdA)

Area
  - Total: 84.35 km^{2} (32.57 sq mi)
  - Land: 81.74 km^{2} (31.56 sq mi)
  - Water: 2.61 km^{2} (1.01 sq mi)
- Elevation: 28 m (92 ft)

Population (January 2021)
  - Total: 43,525
  - Density: 532/km^{2} (1,380/sq mi)
- Demonym: Rhedenaar
- Time zone: UTC+1 (CET)
  - Summer (DST): UTC+2 (CEST)
- Postcode: 6880–6883, 6950–6957, 6990–6994
- Area code: 026, 0313
- Website: www.rheden.nl

Rheden (Dutch pronunciation: [ˈreːdə(n)]) is a municipality and a town in the eastern Netherlands.

== Population centres ==
Population of the seven villages on 1 January 2024

- Velp (18,375)
- Dieren (16,360)
- Rheden (8,930)
- De Steeg (990)
- Ellecom (980)
- Spankeren (805)
- Laag-Soeren (810)

=== Topography ===
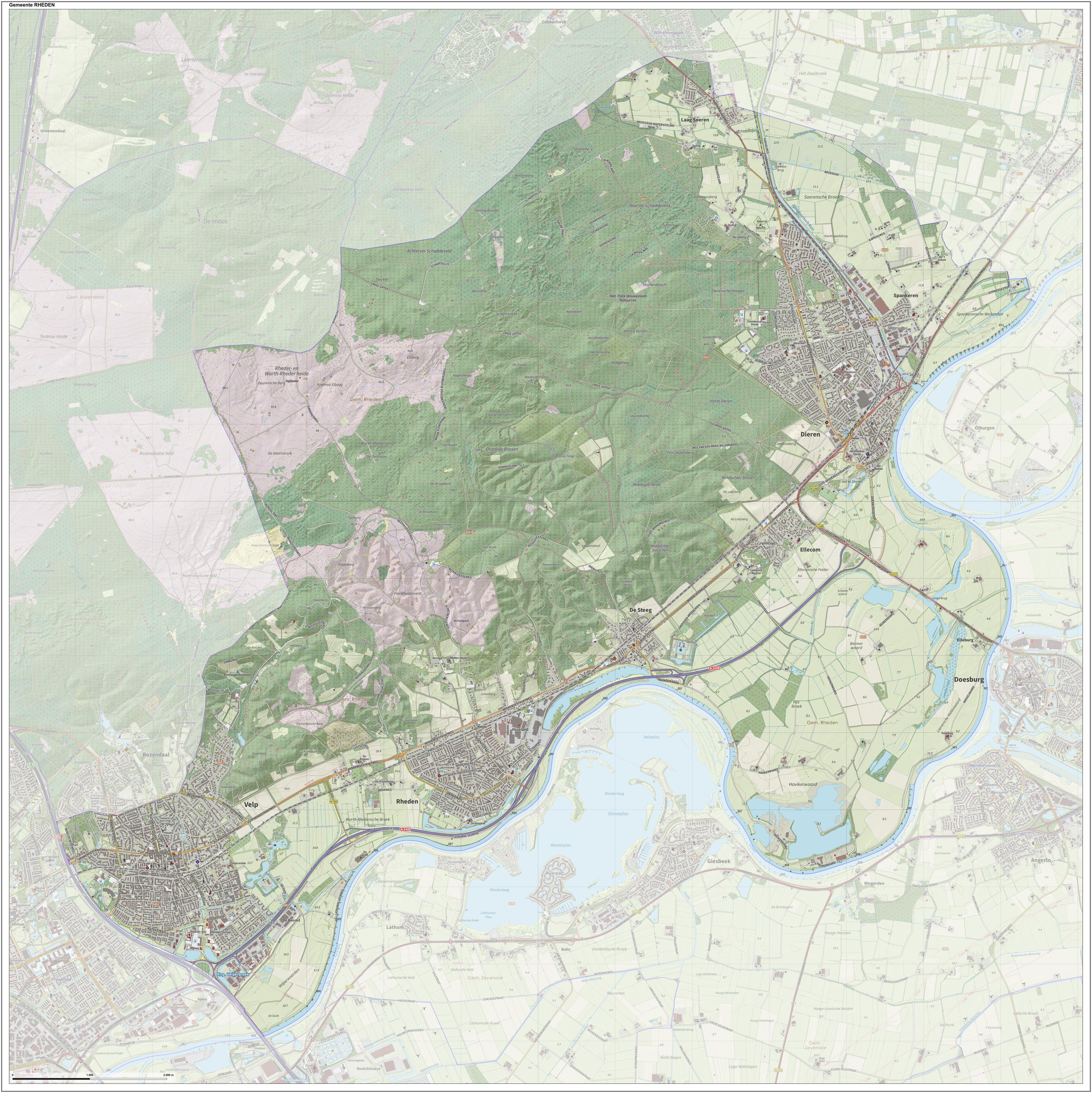

Map of the municipality of Rheden, June 2015

== History ==
The oldest mentions of villages in the municipality of Rheden date from the 9th century, namely Velp and Dieren. Many estates arose at the foot of the Veluwezoom, forming an almost unbroken row from Arnhem to Dieren. Examples are Middachten Castle (14th century), Biljoen Castle (16th century) and Huis Rhederoord (18th century). The estates and their residents provided work for the local population. The castles also provided a safe haven in times of unrest.

The municipality of Rheden was formed in 1573 when the schoutambten Velp and Rheden were merged to form the schoutambt Rheden. Rheden was chosen as the name as the Rheden sheriff's office had the most inhabitants. The municipality was divided into two new municipalities on 1 January 1812: Dieren and Velp. On 1 January 1818 the old situation was restored.

Between 1650 and about 1900 there were seven country estates in the village of Rheden: Scherpenhof, Den Brink, Heuven, De Kruishorst, Snippendaal (until 1916 part of De Kruishorst), Rhederhof and Valkenberg.

During the 19th century, many retirees and pensioners settled in the municipality of Rheden, particularly in De Steeg and Velp. The nearby presence of a city (Arnhem) and beautiful nature were factors that stimulated the growth of the municipality of Rheden. The population quadrupled in a century from 5,000 to 23,000. Velp is now the largest village in the municipality.

== Transportation ==
- Railway stations: Dieren, Rheden, Velp

== Notable residents ==
=== Public service ===
- Lubbert Jan van Eck (1719 in Velp – 1765) the 31st Governor of Ceylon
- Theodoor Johan Arnold van Zijll de Jong (1836 in Velp – 1917) commander of the Royal Netherlands East Indies Army
- Daniël de Blocq van Scheltinga (1903 in Velp – 1962) a Dutch Nazi politician
- Hans van den Broek (1936–2025) a politician, member of the municipal council 1970 to 1974
- Sammy van Tuyll van Serooskerken (born 1951 in Velp) a politician
- Tom Middendorp (born 1960 in Rheden) a retired general of the Royal Netherlands Army
- Erik Proper (born 1967 in Rheden) a computer scientist
- Melanie Schultz van Haegen (born 1970 in Laag-Soeren) a retired politician and businesswoman
- Princess Marilène of Orange-Nassau, van Vollenhoven (born 1970 in Dieren) the wife of Prince Maurits of Orange-Nassau, van Vollenhoven

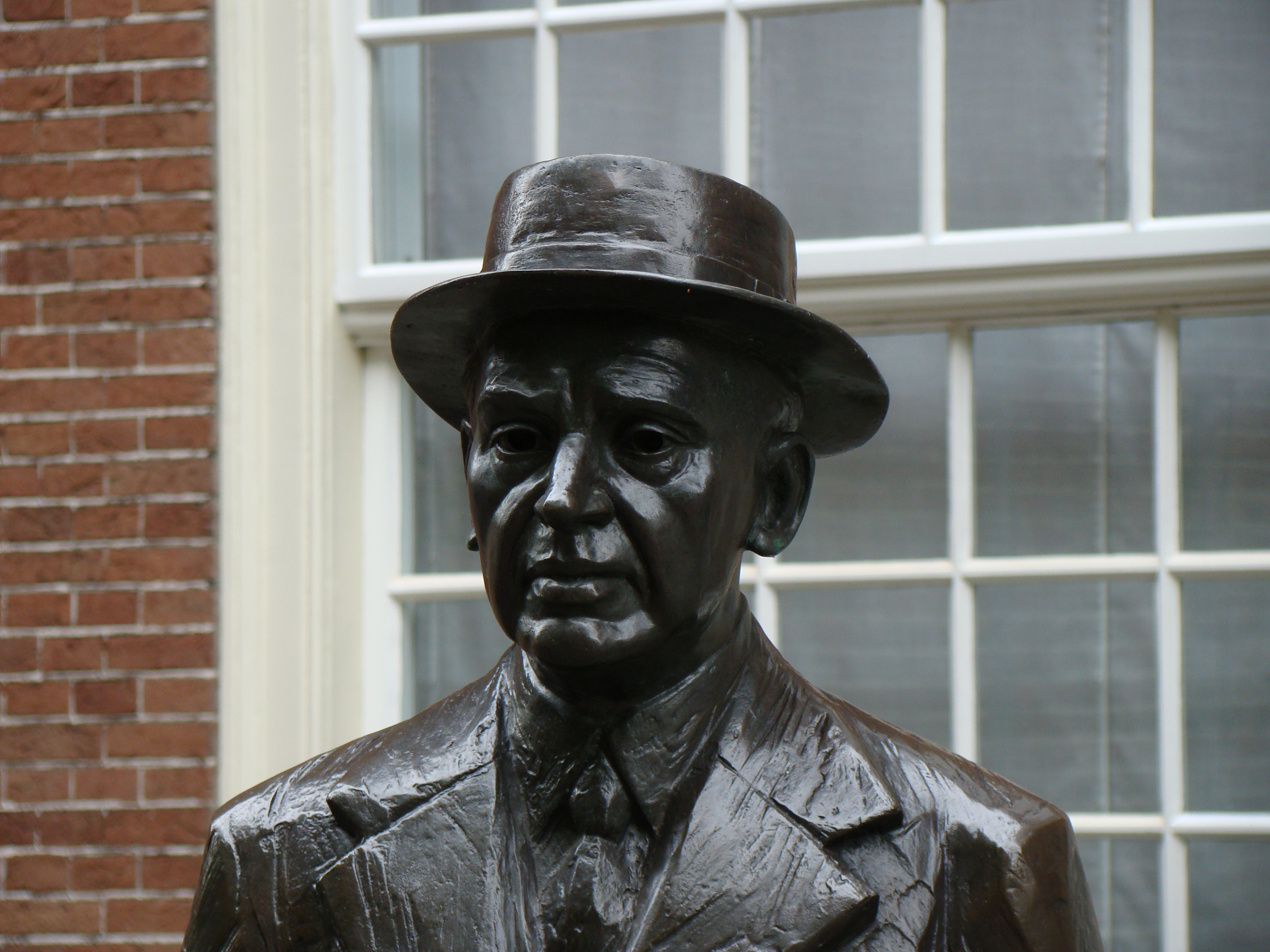
Louis Couperus

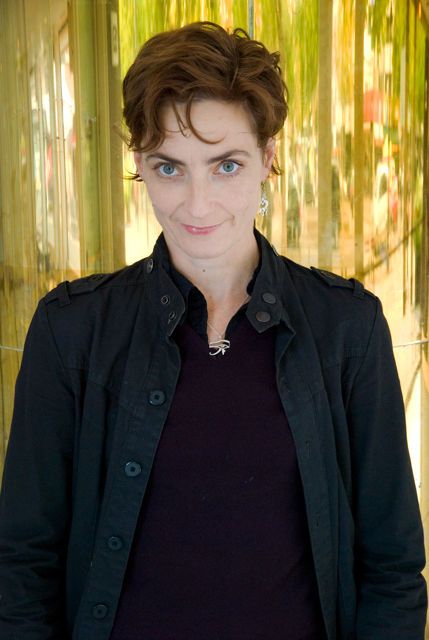
Anouk van Dijk, 2009

=== The arts ===
- Simon Carmiggelt (1913–1987) author, who had a home in De Steeg
- Louis Couperus (1863 – 1923 in De Steeg) a novelist and poet
- Harry de Leeuw (born 1957 in Ellecom) a sculptor living and working in Rheden
- Anouk van Dijk (born 1965 in Velp) a choreographer, dancer, artistic director and teacher
- Baroness Ella van Heemstra (1900 in Velp – 1984) a Dutch-British aristocrat and the mother of Audrey Hepburn
- Teun Jacob (1927 in Rheden – 2009) a Dutch wall painter and sculptor
- Jorrit van der Kooi (born 1972 in Rheden) a film and TV director and presenter
- Mina Kruseman (1839 in Velp – 1922) a 19th-century feminist, actress and author
- Paula van der Oest (born 1965 in Laag-Soeren) a film director and screenwriter
- Jan Siebelink (born 1938 in Velp) an author
- Maarten Demmink (born 1967 in Goudriaan), known as Demiak, a painter, photographer and sculptor
- Corry Vonk (1901–1988), revue and cabaret performer

=== Sport ===
- Jo Teunissen-Waalboer (1919 in Velp – 1991) a Dutch javelin thrower, competed at the 1948 Summer Olympics
- Henk Bosveld (1941 in Velp – 1998) a Dutch football midfielder, with over 500 club caps
- Karel Aalbers (born 1949 in Velp) President of Vitesse Arnhem 1984 to 2000
- René Klaassen (born 1961 in Velp) a former field hockey defender, participated in the 1984 and 1988 Summer Olympics
- Erik Breukink (born 1964 in Rheden) a former professional road racing cyclist
- Edward Gal (born 1970 in Rheden) a Dutch dressage rider, triple gold medalists at the 2010 FEI World Equestrian Games
- Ho-Pin Tung (born 1982 in Velp) a Chinese-Dutch auto-racing driver
- Jhon van Beukering (born 1983 in Velp) an Indonesian naturalised retired footballer with over 200 club caps

== Miscellaneous ==
- The Gazelle bicycle factory is situated in Dieren.

== Gallery ==
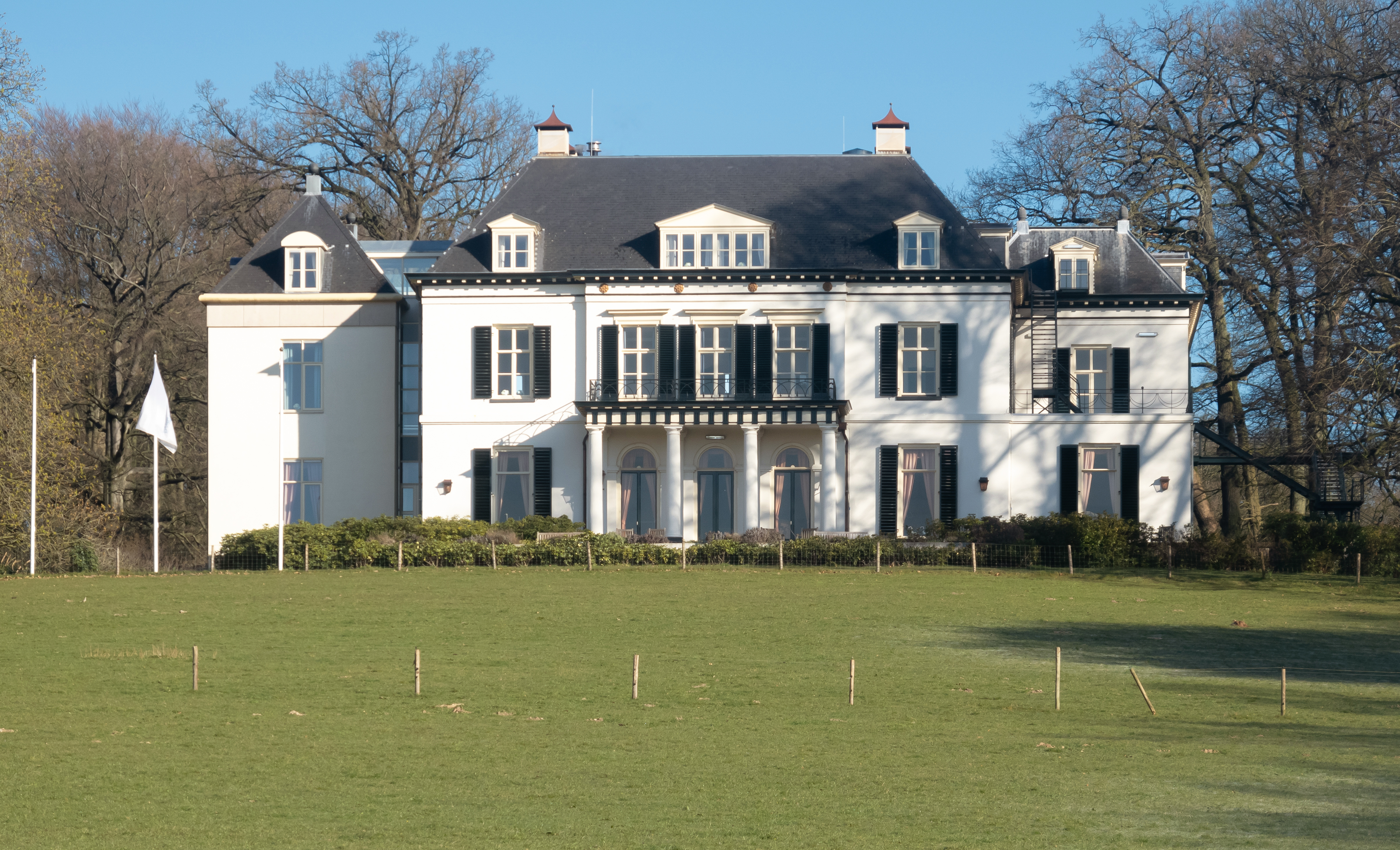
Rheden, country house: de Valkenberg

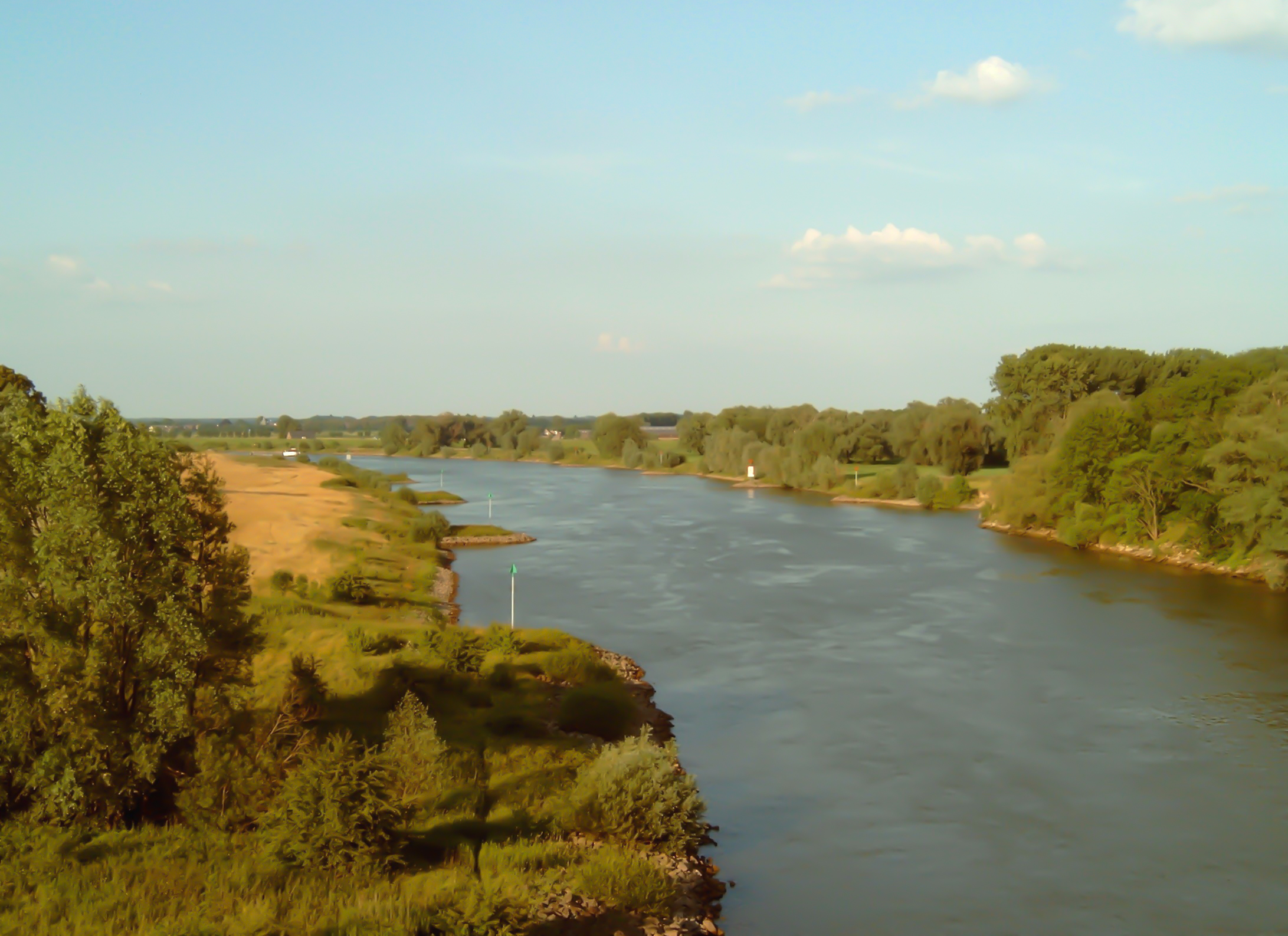
Velp, river: de IJssel

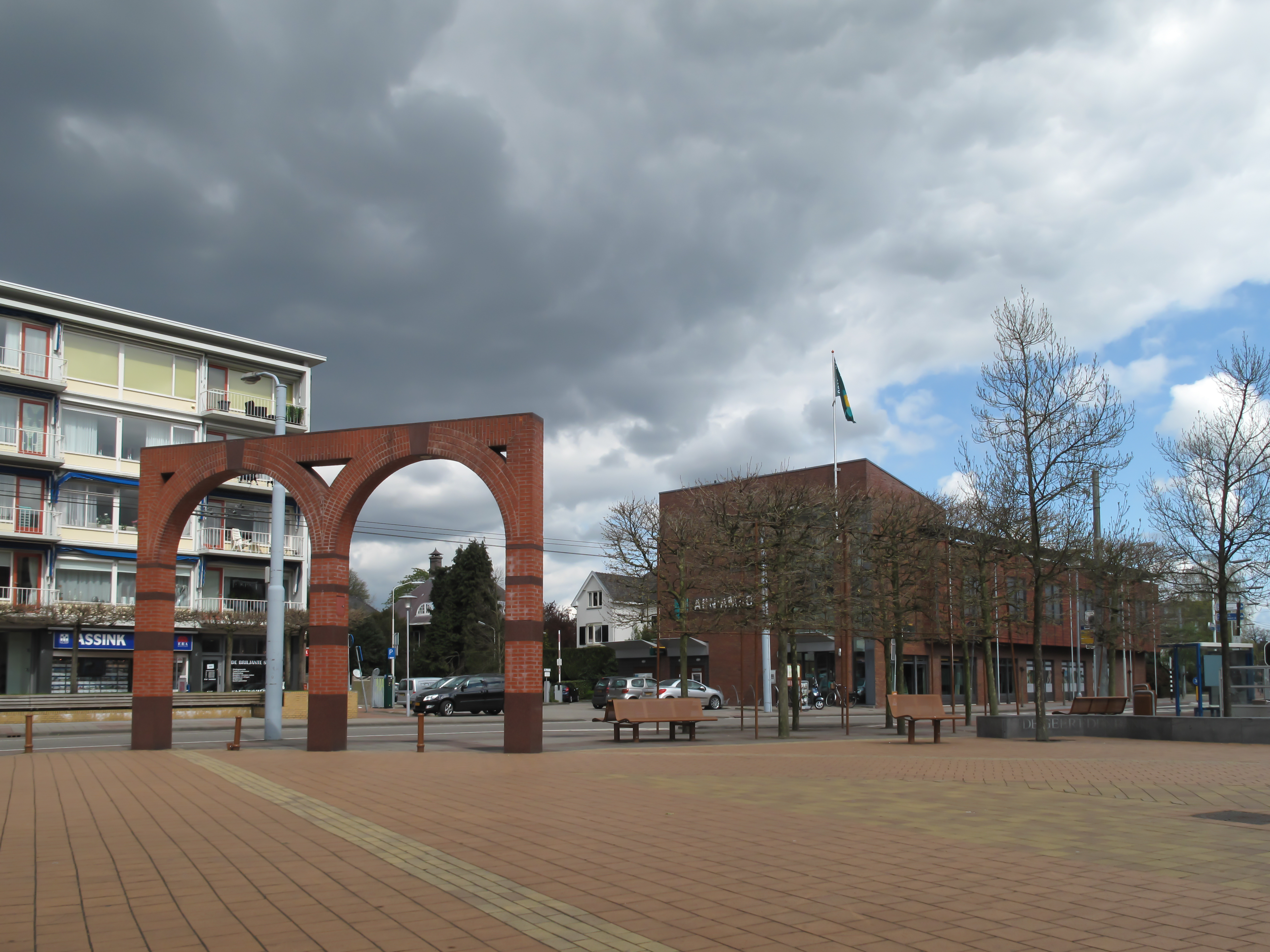
Velp, view of a street (de Hoofdstraat)

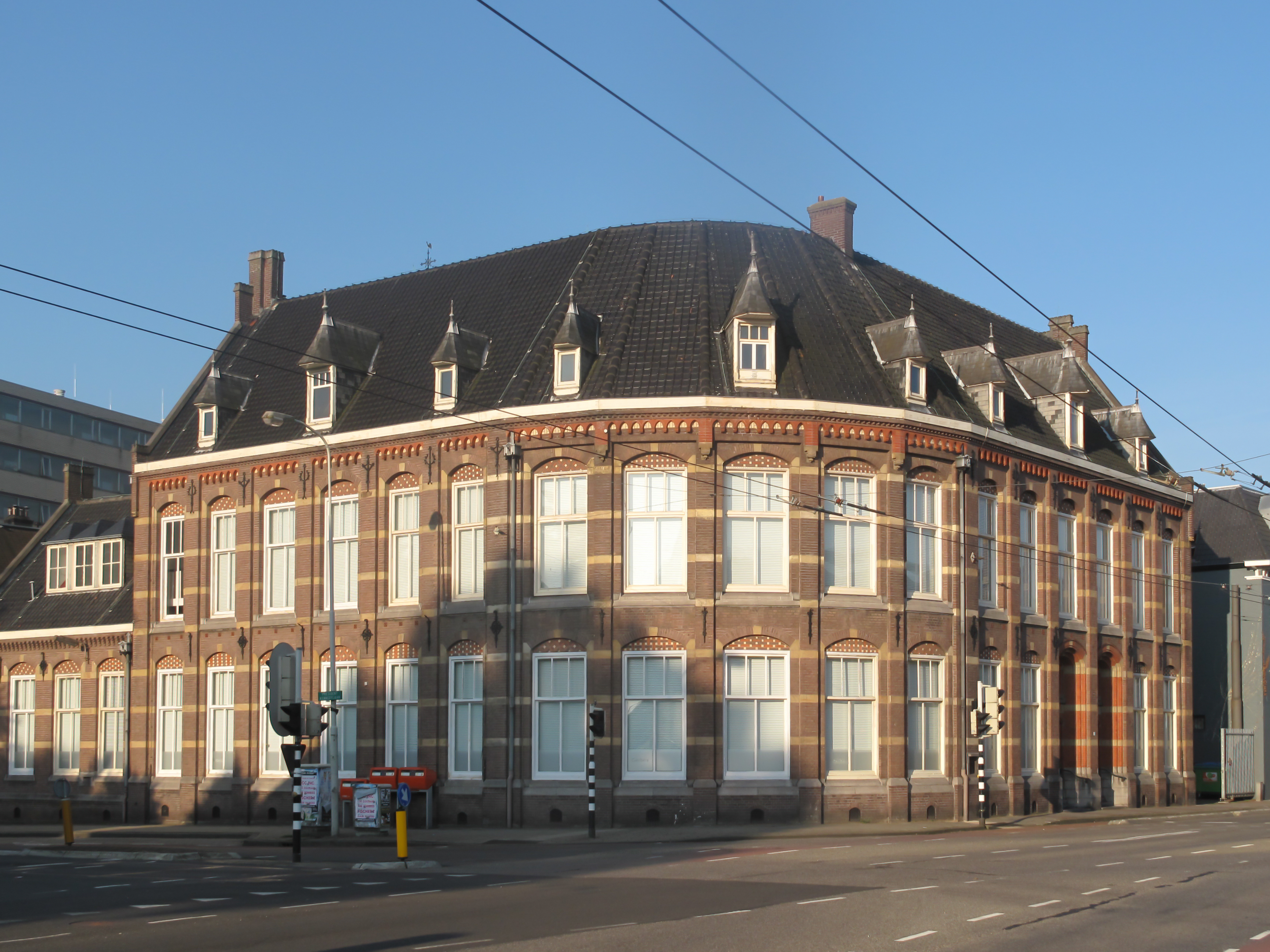
Velp, office building at the Hoofdstraat

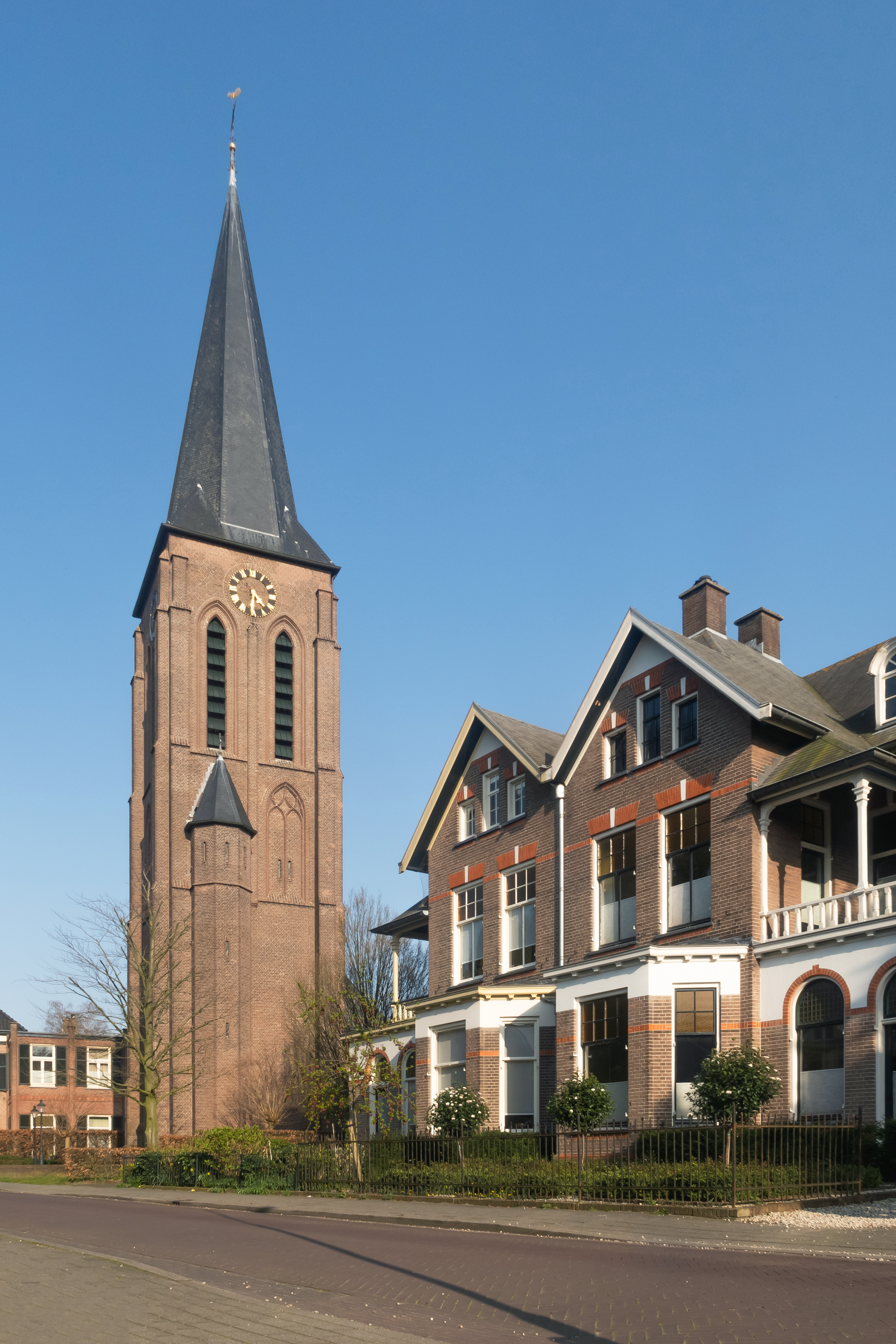
Dieren, tower: de Dierense toren

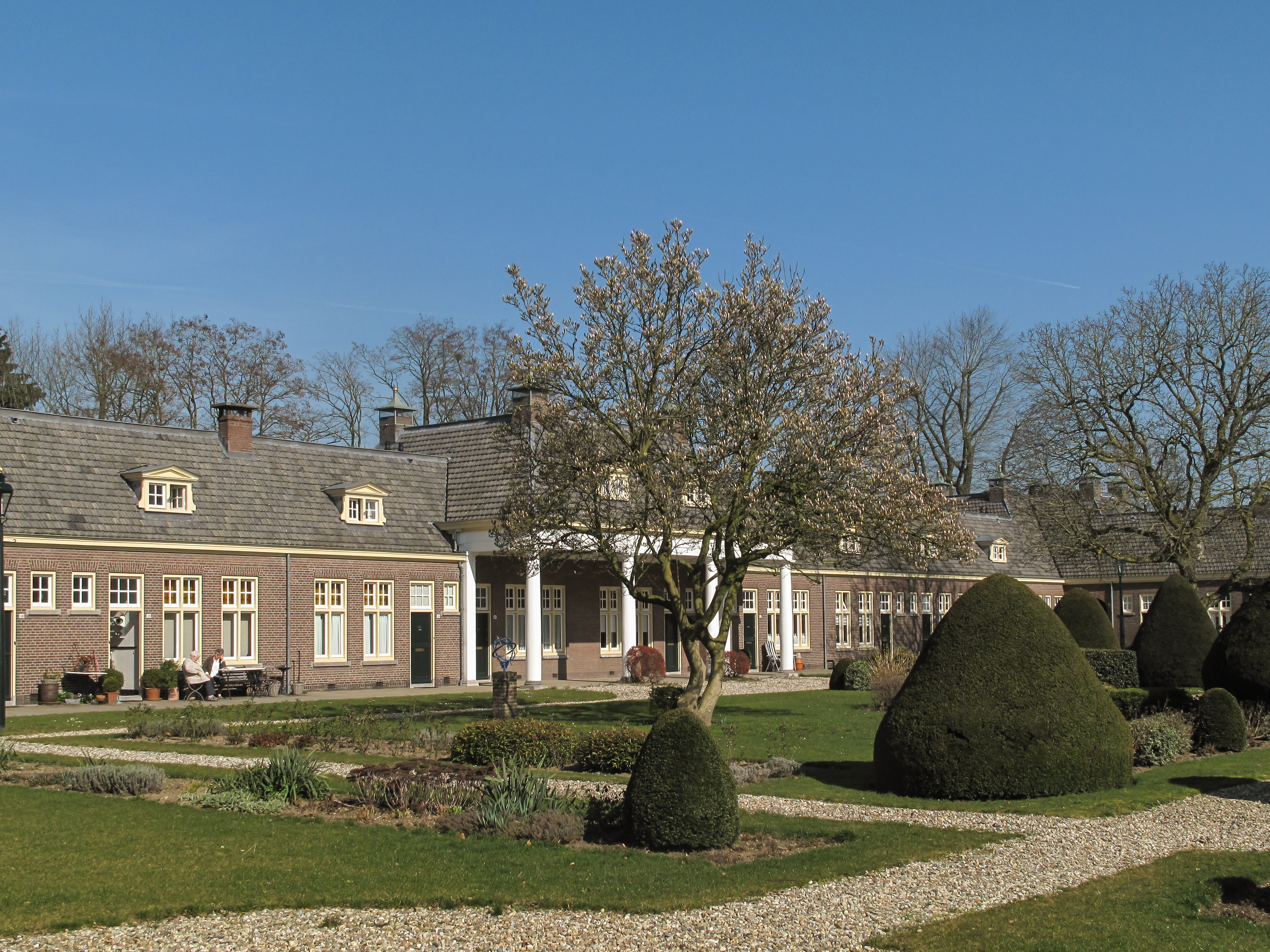
Dieren, historic houses: Schweer bey der Beckehof

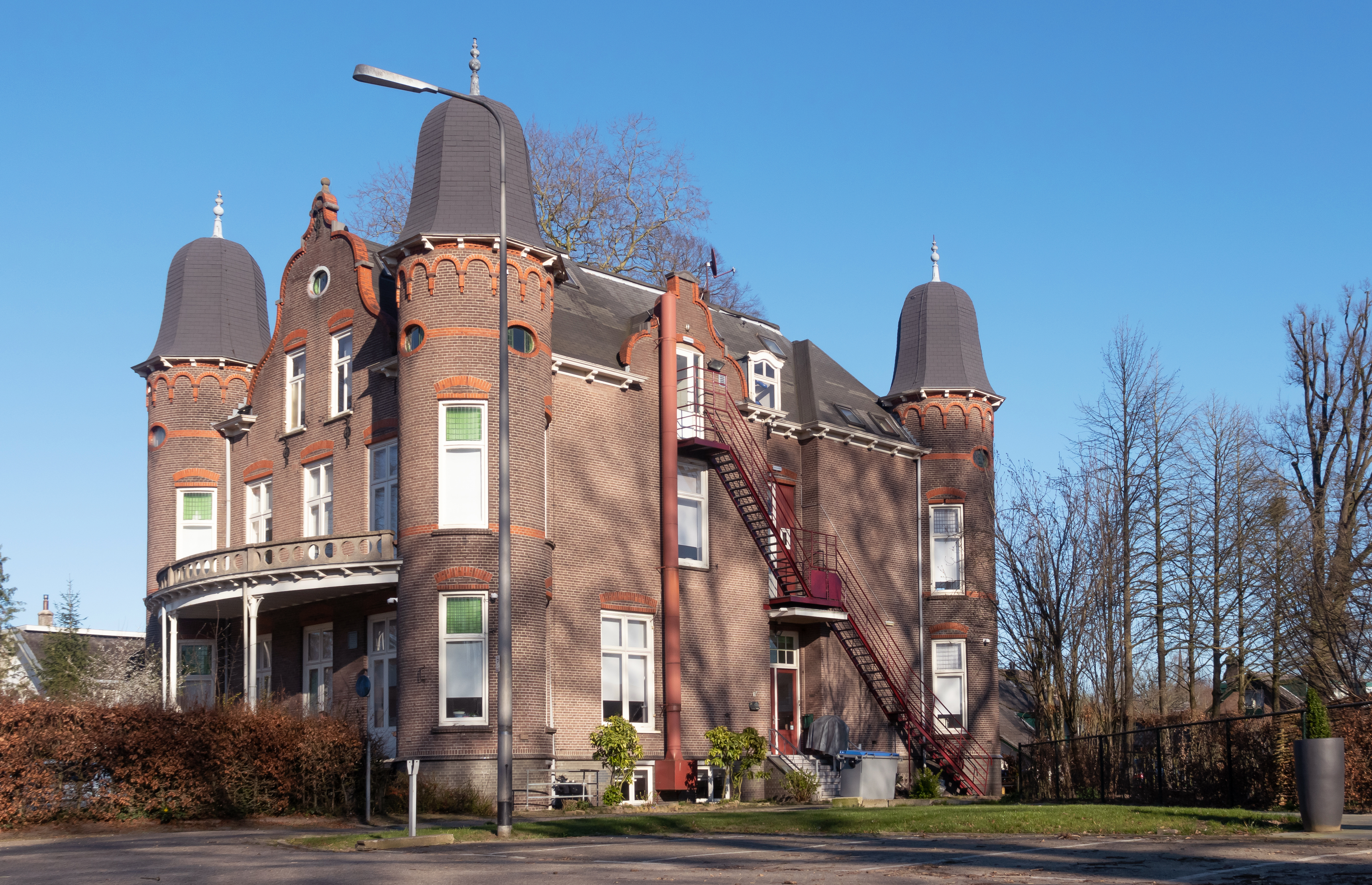
De Steeg, villa: Huize Rhederpark

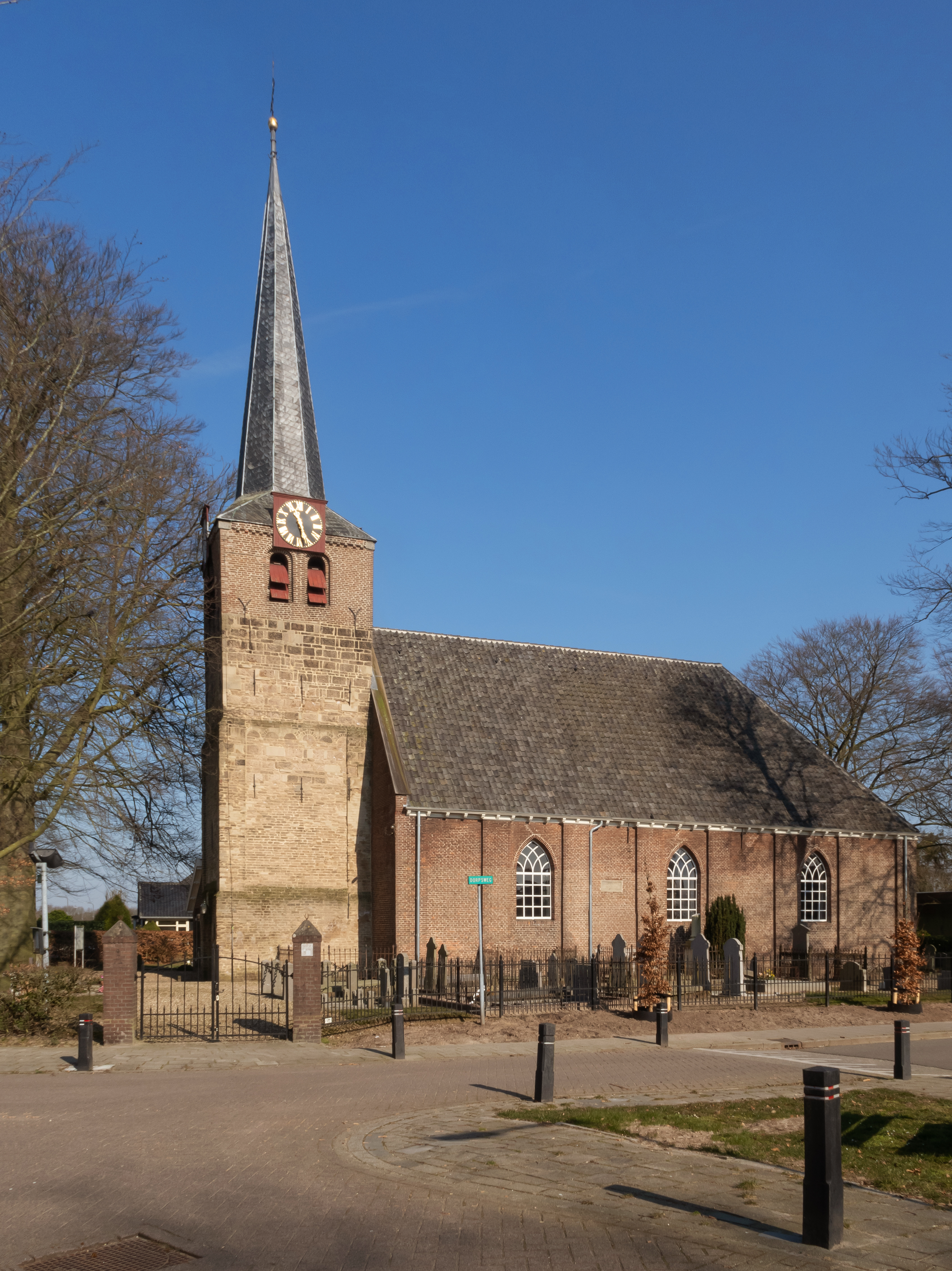
Spankeren, reformed church

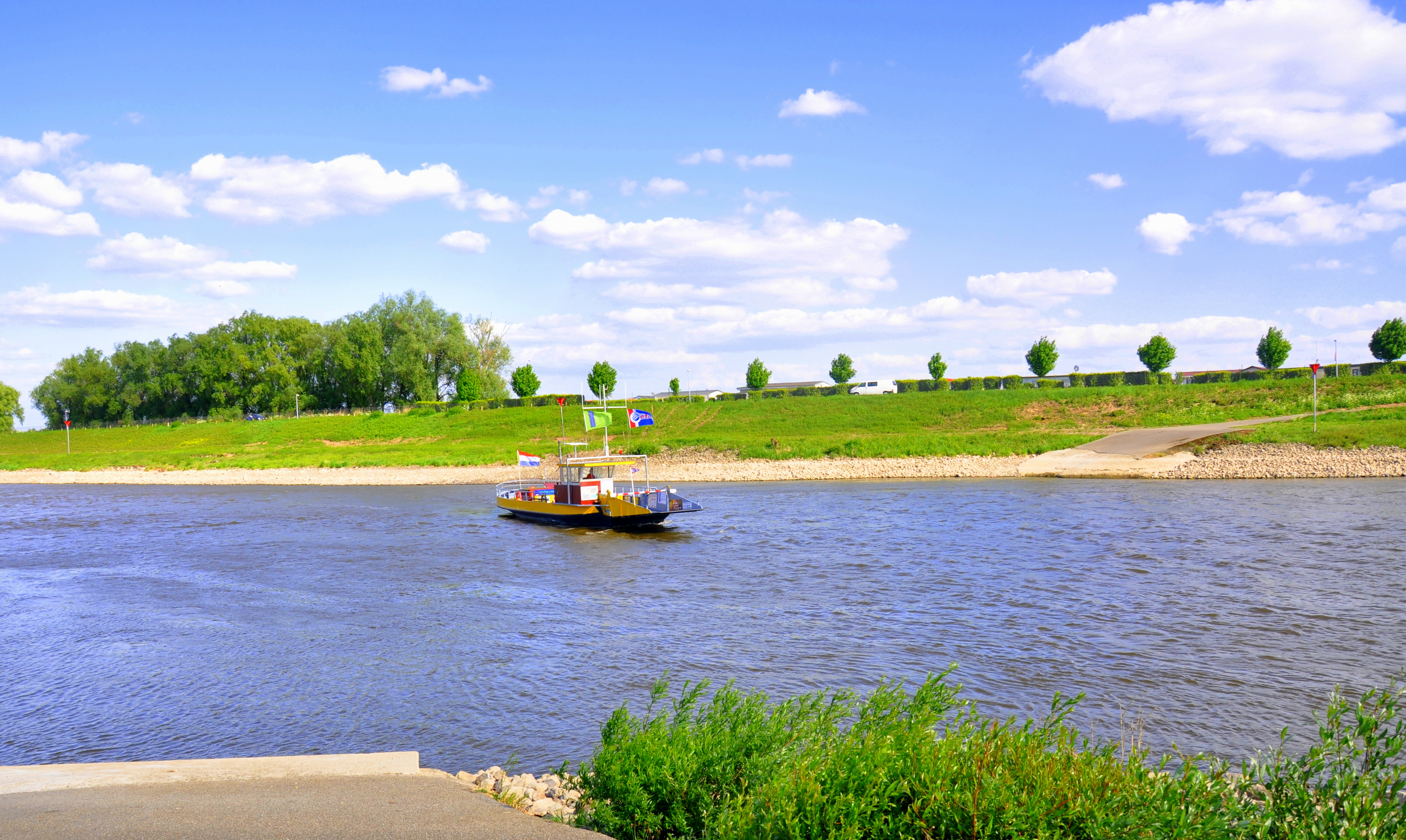
Bicycle Ferry on the IJssel crossing Rheden to Lathum - panoramio
