= Post office in De Steeg =

National heritage site in Rheden, the Netherlands

Coordinates: 52°01′14″N 6°03′46″E

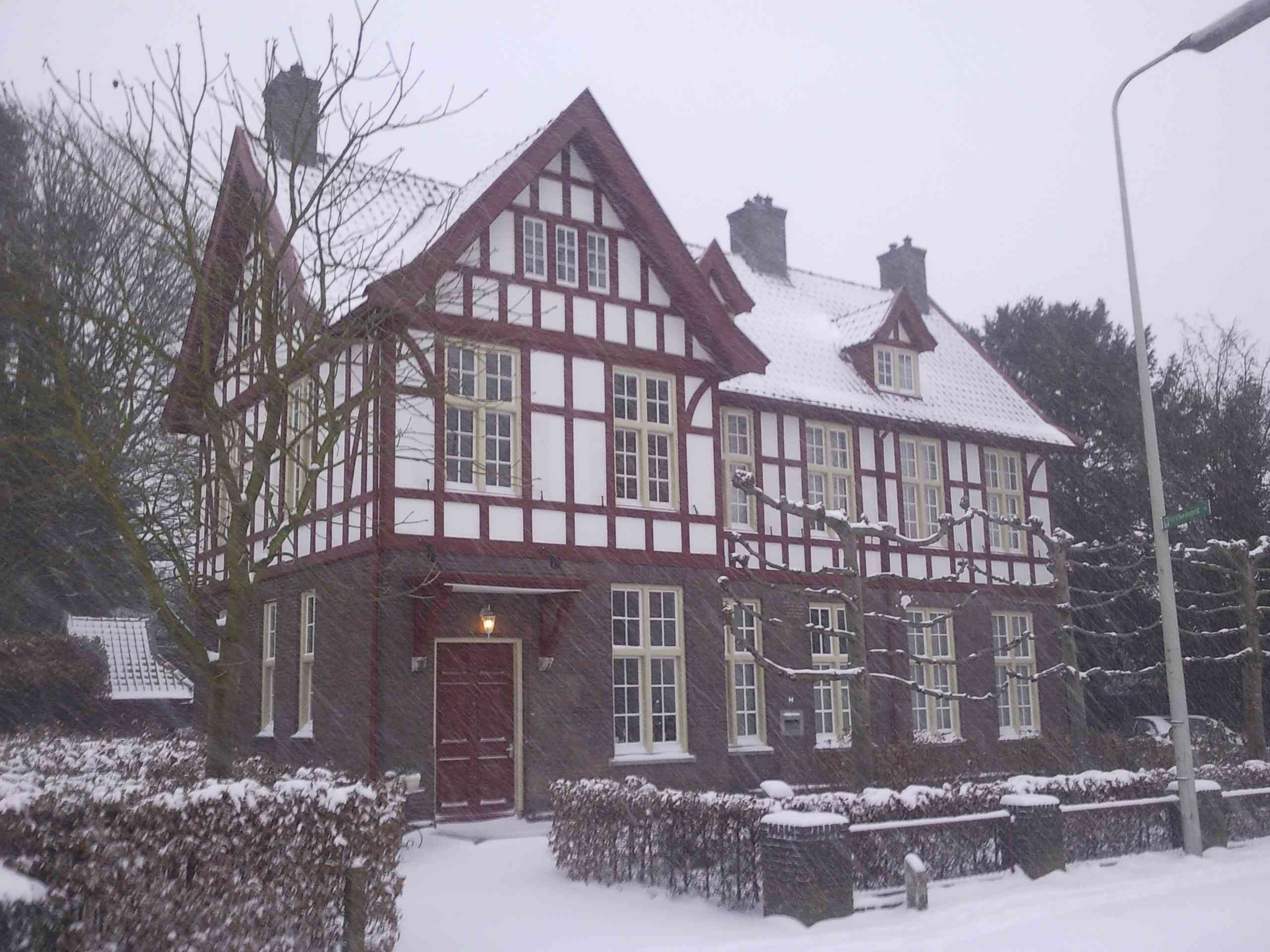
Postoffice, Hoofdstraat 21, 6994 AC De Steeg, Rheden, the Netherlands, 2009.

The post office in De Steeg is a monumental building located on Hoofdstraat 21 in De Steeg, Rheden, the Netherlands. It was built in 1905, by order of count Bentinck (the owner of Middachten Castle), based on a design by G. J. Uiterwijk. Due to the noticeable style, which resembles timber framing, the building and a nearby barn were made a rijksmonument on June 15, 2001.

The building was allegedly built on the occasion of a visit by the German emperor Wilhelm II in 1909 to Middachten. Afterwards the building was offered for use to the local postal service. The building would stay in use as post office till June 1, 1992. After the closing of the post office the building became private property and served as living and office space. After it functioned as a combination of living space and a delicatessen store, part of it is now a restaurant.
