= Velp =

Velp may refer to:

- Velp, Gelderland, Netherlands
  - Velp railway station
- Velp, North Brabant, Netherlands
- Velp or Velpe, a tributary of the Demer river, in Belgium
