= Steven Jacobsz Vennekool =

Dutch architect

Steven Jacobsz Vennekool (1656/57–1719) was an 18th-century architect from the Dutch Republic. He was born and died in Amsterdam.

His father Jacob Vennekool was an assistant to Jacob van Campen, along with Pieter Post, Arent van 's Gravesande, Bartholomeus Drijflhout, Willem de Keyser, and Daniël Stalpaert and learned from him the neo-classical styles made popular by Palladio and Vincenzo Scamozzi. His grandfather was a member of the chamber of rhetoric called the Egelantier. His sister married the painter Johannes Glauber. According to the Netherlands Institute for Art History he was buried in Amsterdam on 7 March 1719.

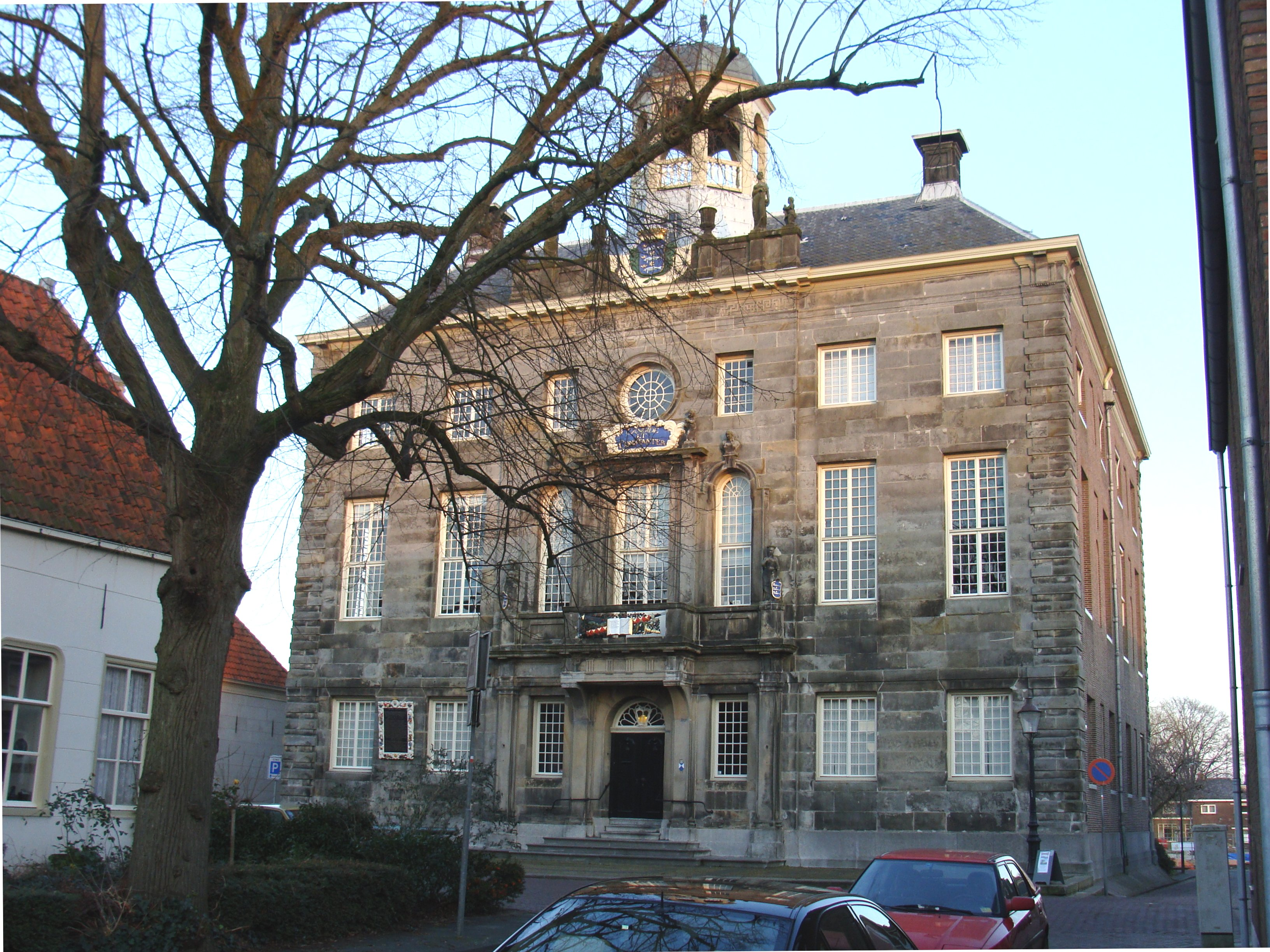
City hall of Enkhuizen, seen from the Kalksteiger

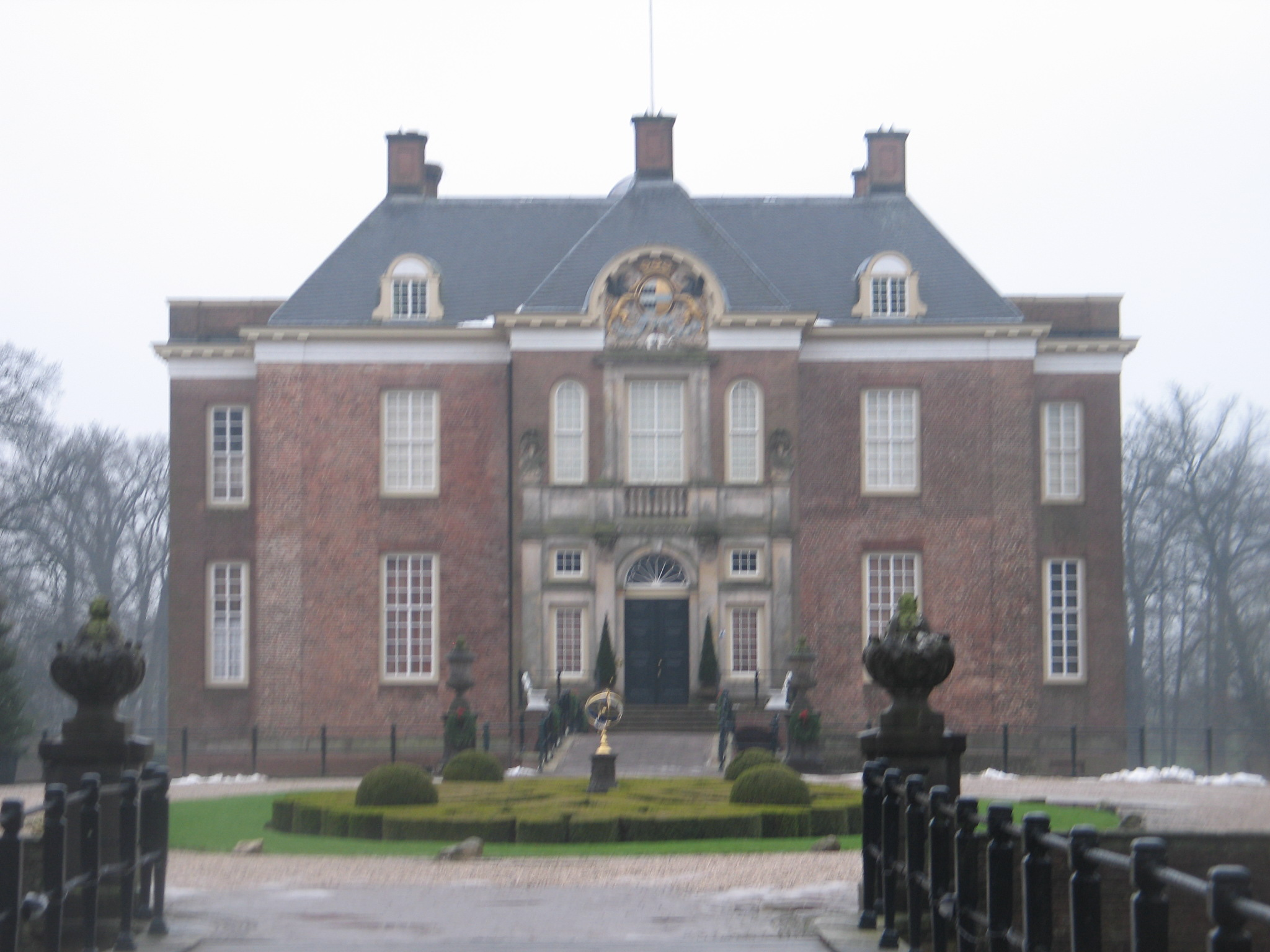
Middachten Castle, De Steeg

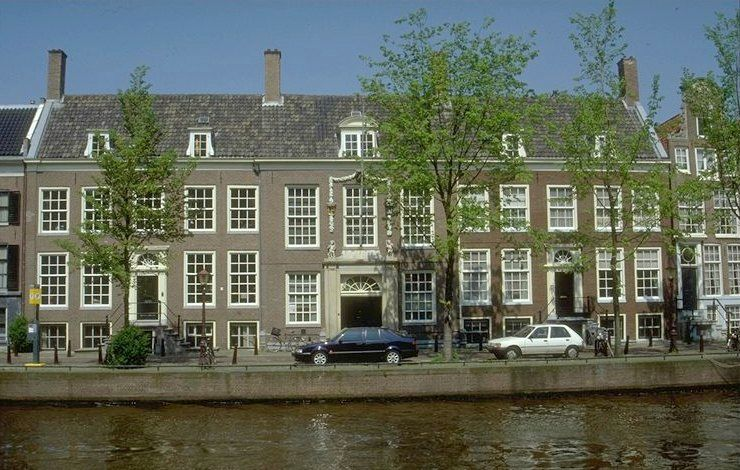
Deutzenhofje, Prinsengracht, Amsterdam
