= Ellecom =

- Village
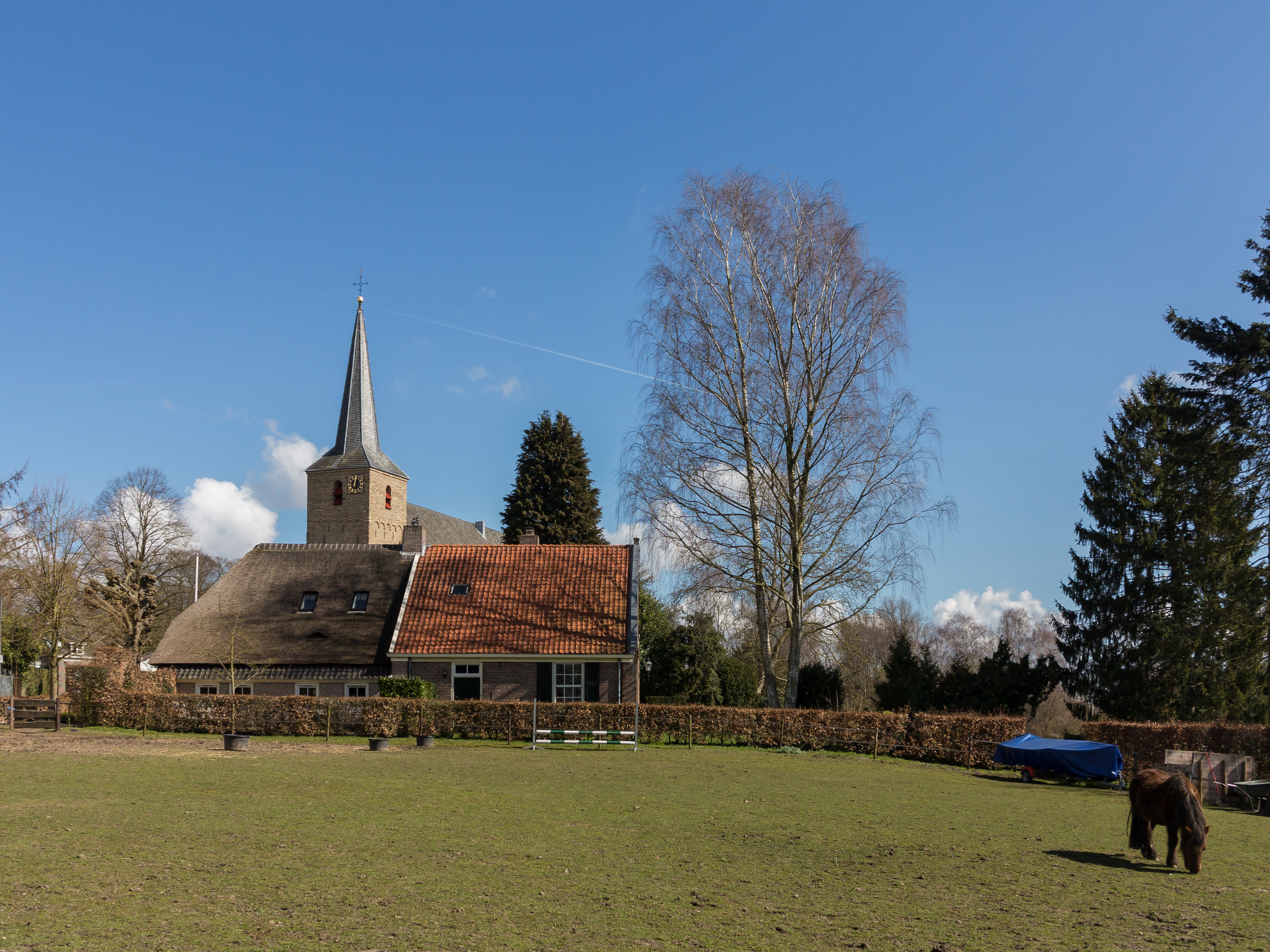
- Reformed church

- Location in the Netherlands Ellecom (Netherlands)
- Coordinates: 52°02′N 6°05′E
- Country: Netherlands
- Province: Gelderland
- Municipality: Rheden

Area
  - Total: 0.81 km^{2} (0.31 sq mi)
- Elevation: 17 m (56 ft)

Population (2021)
  - Total: 1,035
  - Density: 1,300/km^{2} (3,300/sq mi)
- Time zone: UTC+1 (CET)
  - Summer (DST): UTC+2 (CEST)
- Postal code: 6955
- Dialing code: 0313

Ellecom is a village in the municipality of Rheden in the province of Gelderland, the Netherlands.

== History ==
It was first mentioned between 1128 and 1139 as Ellenchem, and means "the settlement of Ello (person)". In 1127, a chapel was built which was turned into a church in 1359. It was extended in 1859. The church was heavily damaged in 1945 and restored in 1949. Avegoor is an estate near Ellecom and was a property of Middachten Castle. It was first mentioned in 1356. The current estate dates from 1847. In 1942, a sports hall was built on the estate using forced labour by the German authorities. It is one of the few extant buildings in national socialist style, but has become derelict. In 1840, Ellecom was home to 323 people.

== Gallery ==
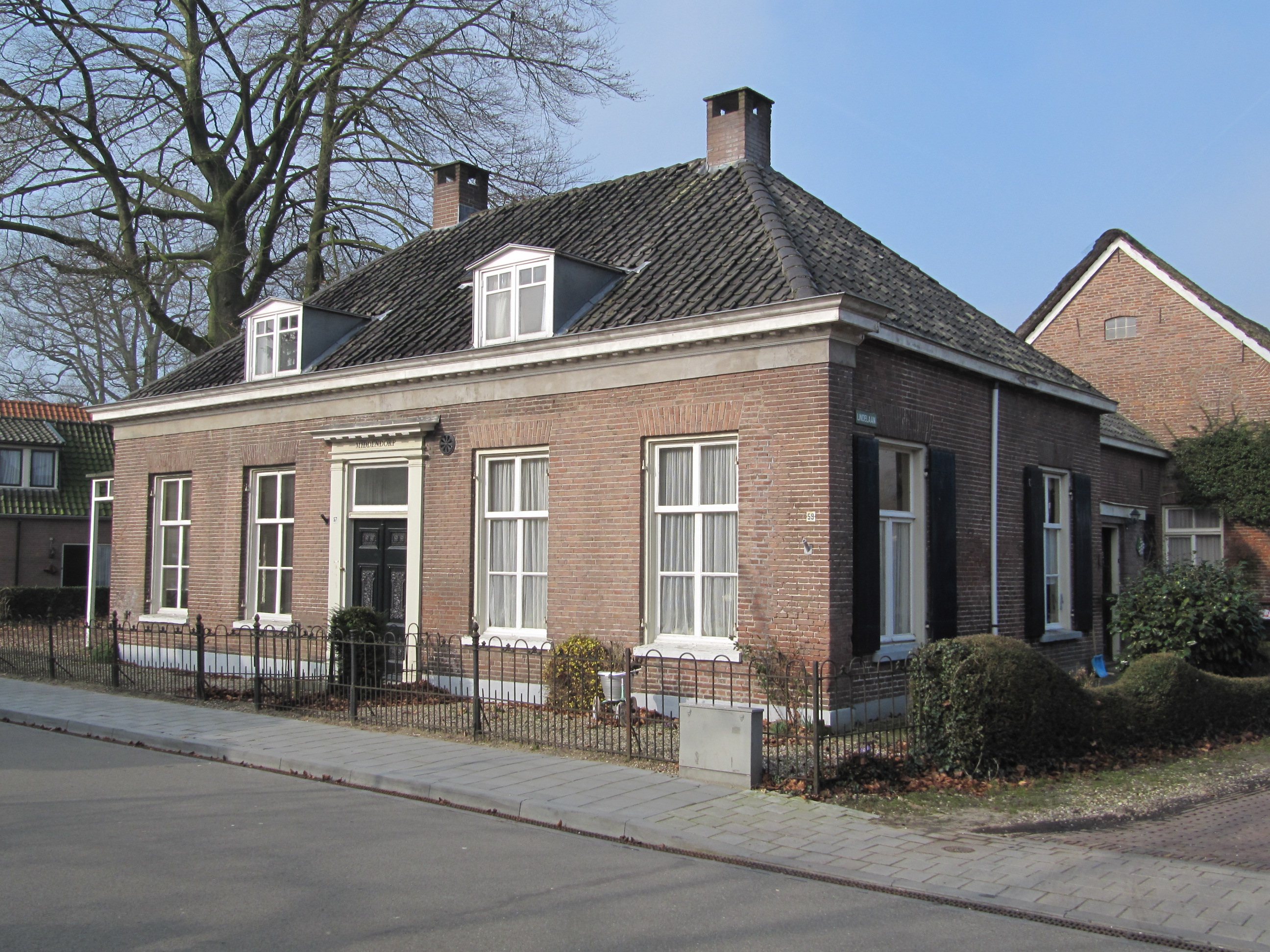
Huis Middendorp in Ellecom

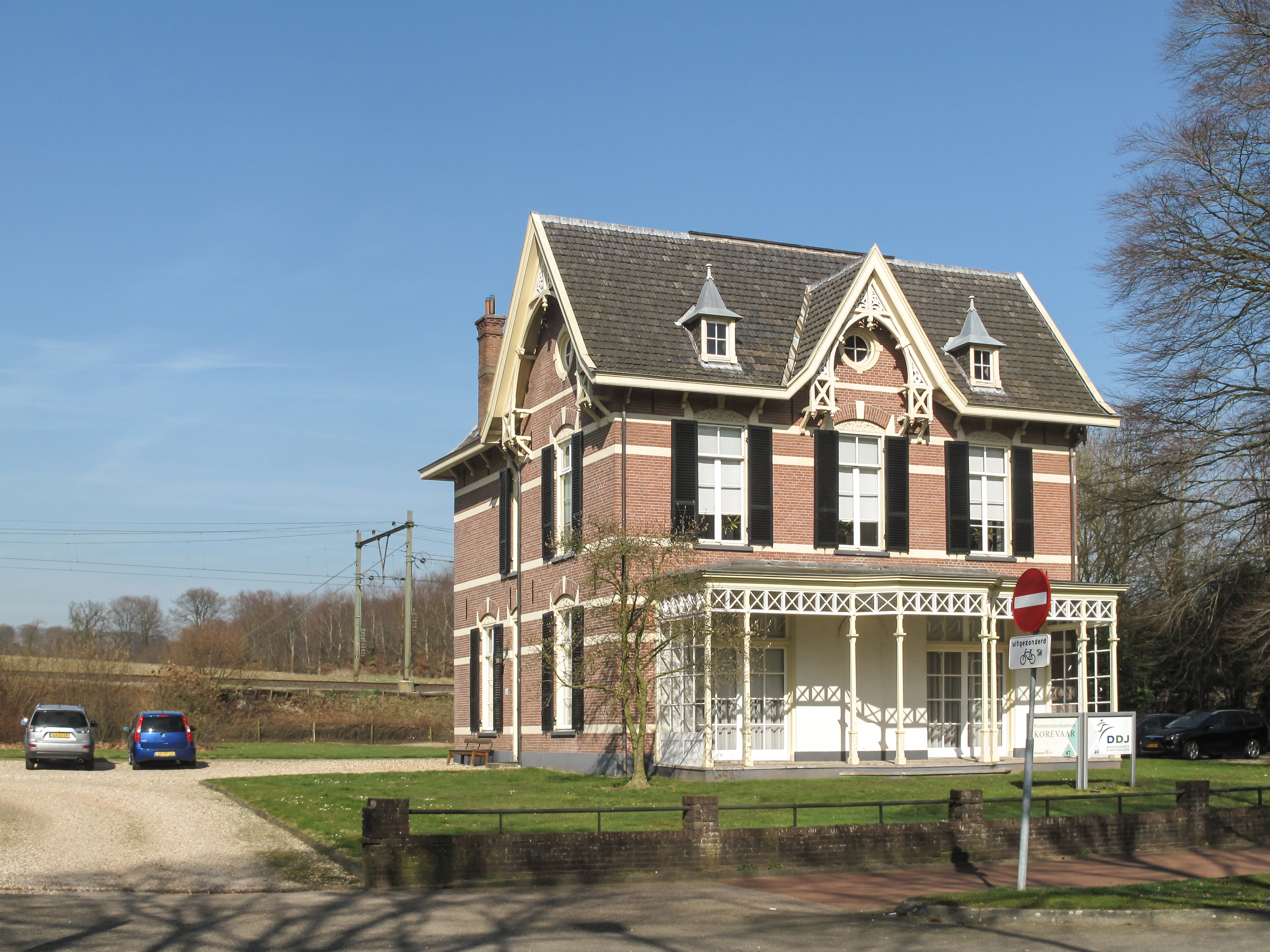
Rentmeesterkantoor Korevaar

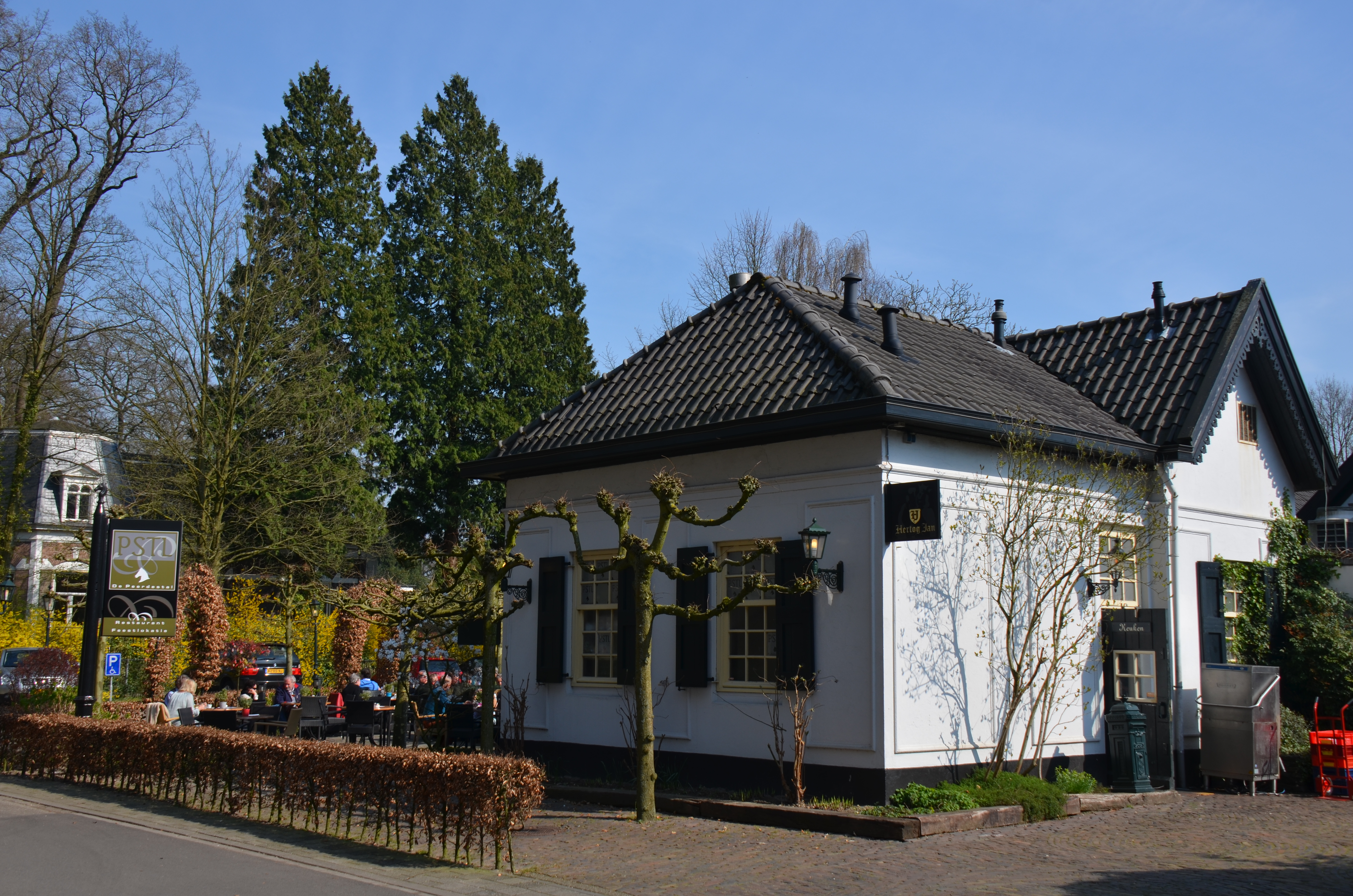
Restaurant in Ellecom
