= Rheden railway station =

Railway station located in Rheden, Netherlands

Rheden
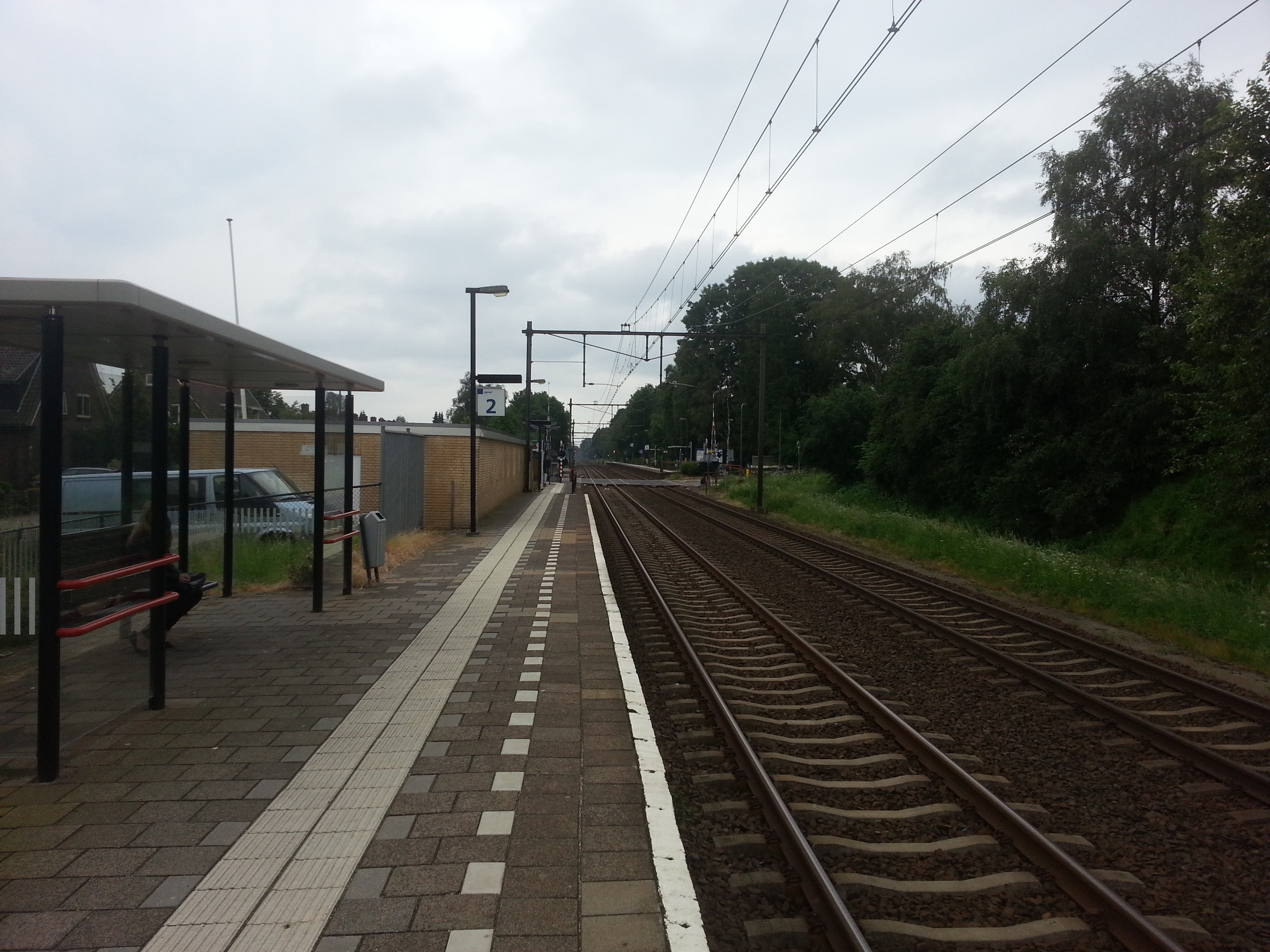
- Platform 2 at Rheden railway station in 2015

General information
- Location: Netherlands
- Coordinates: 52°00′35″N 6°01′47″E
- Line: Arnhem–Leeuwarden railway

History
- Opened: 1882

Services
Preceding station	Nederlandse Spoorwegen	Following station
Velp towards Wijchen	NS Sprinter 7600	Dieren towards Zutphen
Location
- Location within Netherlands

Rheden is a railway station located in Rheden, Netherlands. The station was opened in 1882 and is located on the Arnhem–Leeuwarden railway. The station is currently operated by Nederlandse Spoorwegen. The station closed on 2 October 1927 and reopened on 18 May 1952. The platforms are not located opposite each other, but on either side of the level crossing.

== Train services ==
Route	Service type	Operator	Notes
(Wijchen -) Nijmegen - Arnhem - Zutphen	Local ("Sprinter")	NS	2x per hour - 1x per hour after 22:00 and on Sundays.

== Bus services ==
Line	Route	Operator	Notes
43	Apeldoorn Station - Apeldoorn Zuid - Beekbergen - Loenen - Eerbeek - Laag-Soeren - Dieren - Ellecom - De Steeg - Rheden - Velp Zuid - Arnhem Presikhaaf - Arnhem Het Broek - Arnhem CS	Breng, Syntus Gelderland, TCR (only a couple of runs)	Mostly a joint operation between Breng and Syntus Gelderland because the line runs through both service areas.
70	Giesbeek - Doesburg - Ellecom - De Steeg - Rheden - Rozendaal Rhedens Lyceum	Breng	1 run during both rush hours. Does not run during Summer Break.
843	Arnhem Willemsplein → Arnhem Velperpoort → Arnhem Presikhaaf → Velp → Rheden → De Steeg → Ellecom → Dieren → Doesburg	Breng	Only two runs during Saturday late nights. A special tariff applies.
