= De Steeg =

- Village
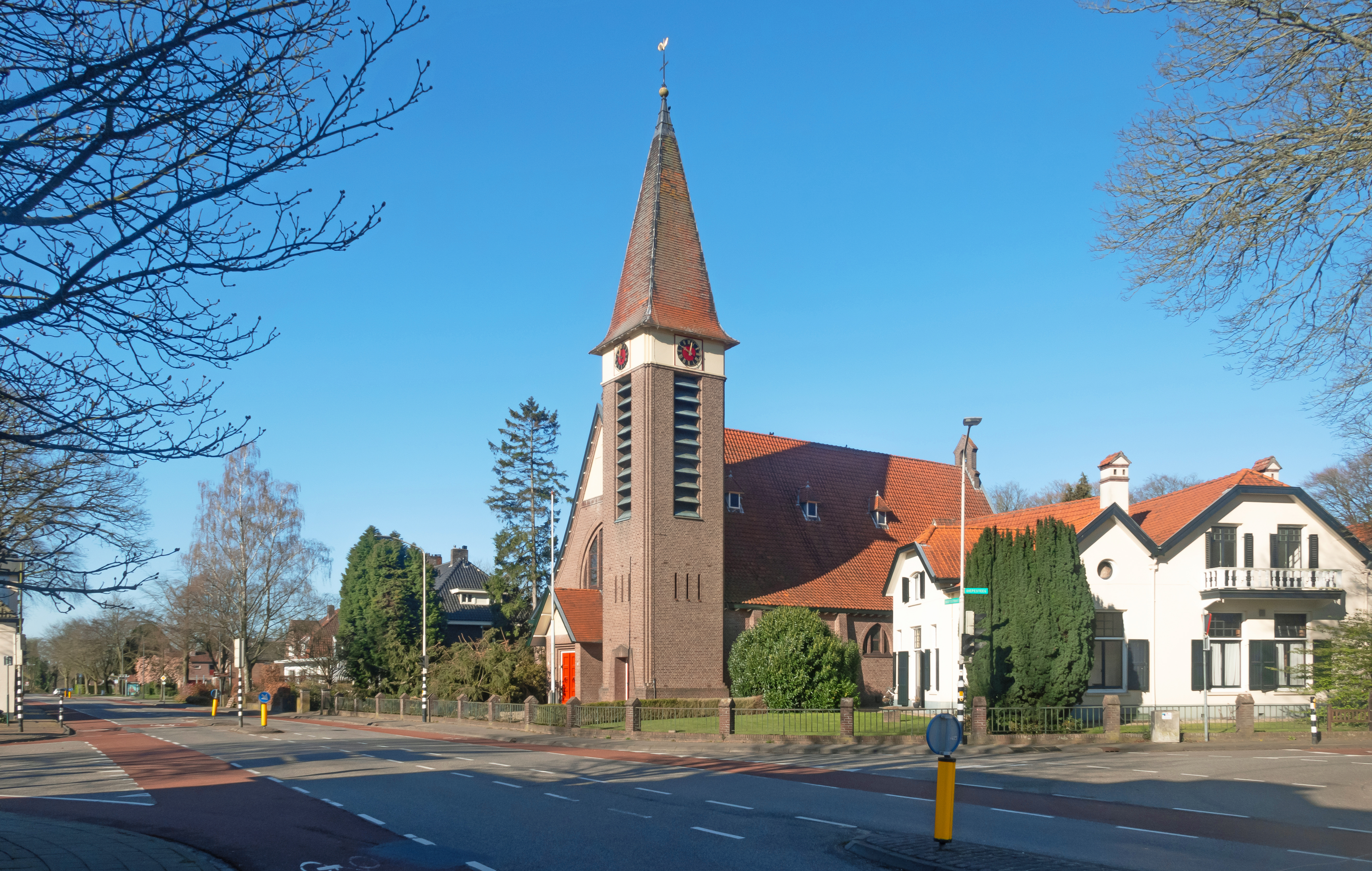
- (Former) Catholic church

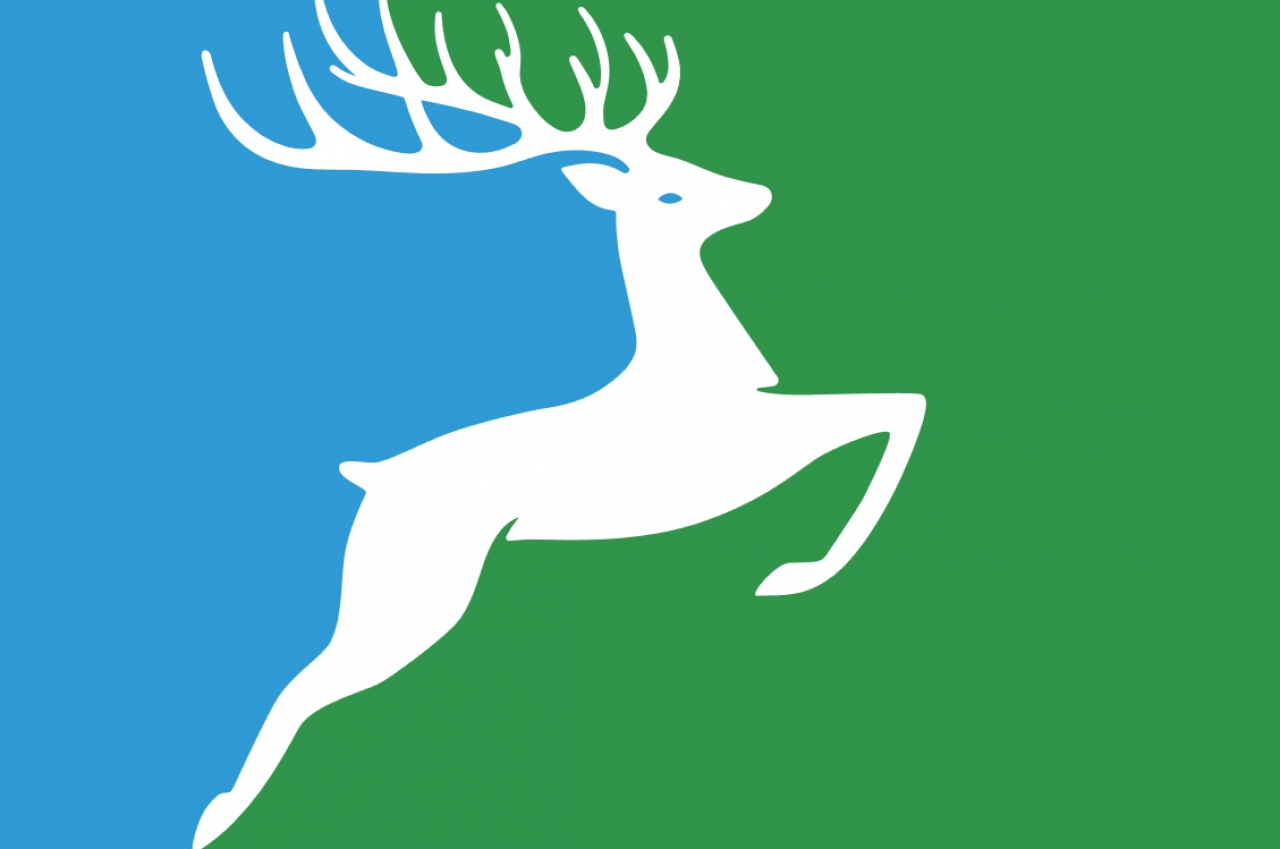
- Flag

- Location in the Netherlands De Steeg (Netherlands)
- Coordinates: 52°01′N 6°04′E
- Country: Netherlands
- Province: Gelderland
- Municipality: Rheden

Area
  - Total: 9.63 km^{2} (3.72 sq mi)
- Elevation: 21 m (69 ft)

Population (2021)
  - Total: 1,005
  - Density: 104/km^{2} (270/sq mi)
- Time zone: UTC+1 (CET)
  - Summer (DST): UTC+2 (CEST)
- Postal code: 6994
- Dialing code: 026

De Steeg is a Dutch village within the municipality of Rheden. Due to its central location within the municipality, it houses the town hall.

Middachten Castle is located near the village. Several De Steeg buildings once belonged to the Middachten estate. These buildings, including the Post office in De Steeg, can be recognized by the red and white color scheme.

== History ==
It was first mentioned in 1648 as Opde Steegh, and means path. The village developed around Middachten Castle. The castle was first mentioned in 1315. The current building dates from between 1354 and 1357. It was restored in 1643, and enlarged between 1694 and 1697. Rhederoord is a manor house from the 17th century which was enlarged in 1745. In 1840, De Steeg was home to 545 people. In 1885, it became an independent parish.

== Flag ==
The flag of De Steeg is a bicolour of blue and green, with a white leaping deer in the middle.

The flag was unveiled on April 26, 2025, during the village's King's Day celebrations, and was designed by Ronald Sterk. It was one of sixteen designs that were voted on, and won with 98 out of 447 total votes cast.

The green represents the Veluwe forests and the blue represents the IJssel River. The leaping deer symbolizes the village, looking toward a promising future.

== Gallery ==
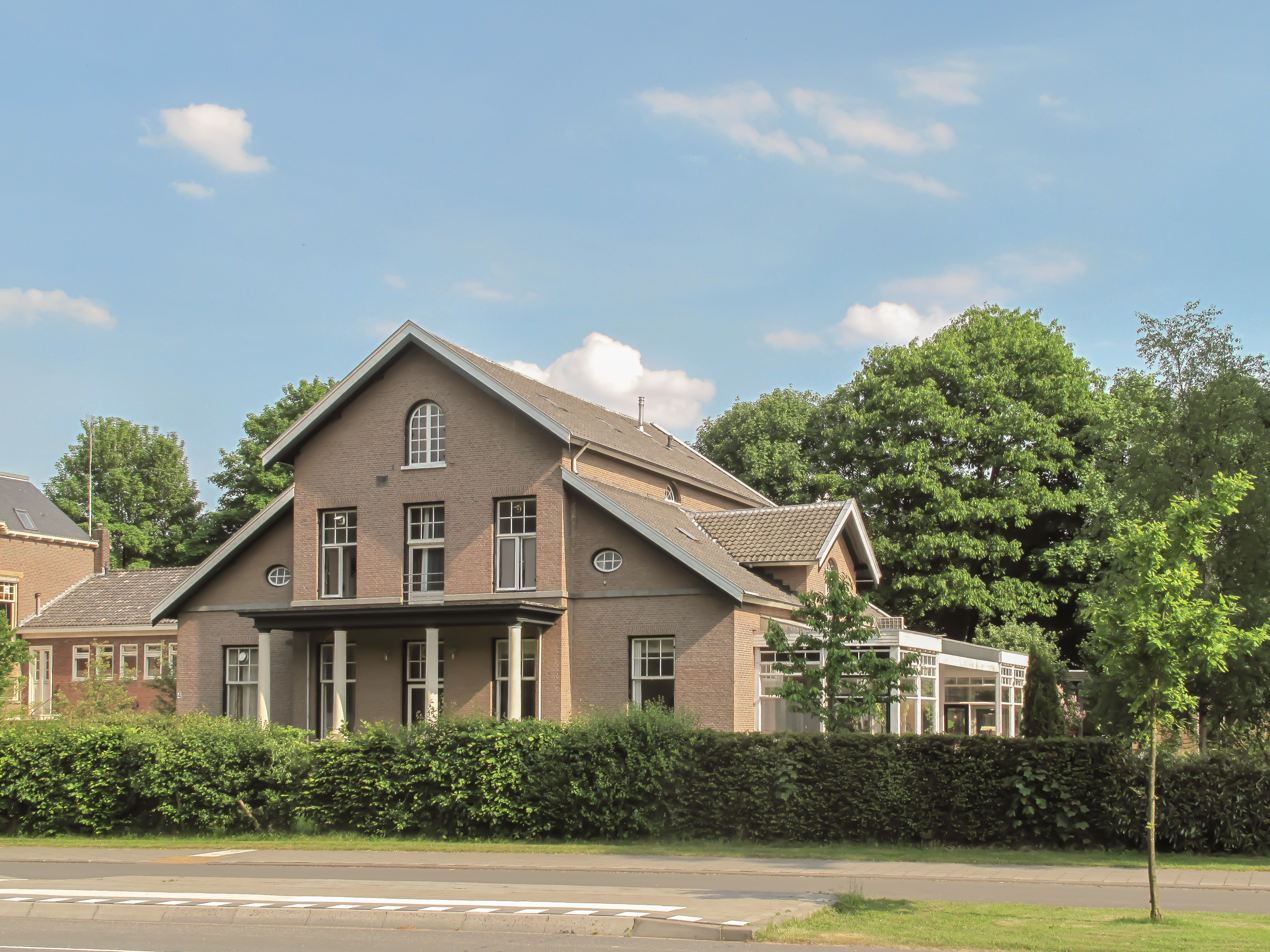
Former town hall

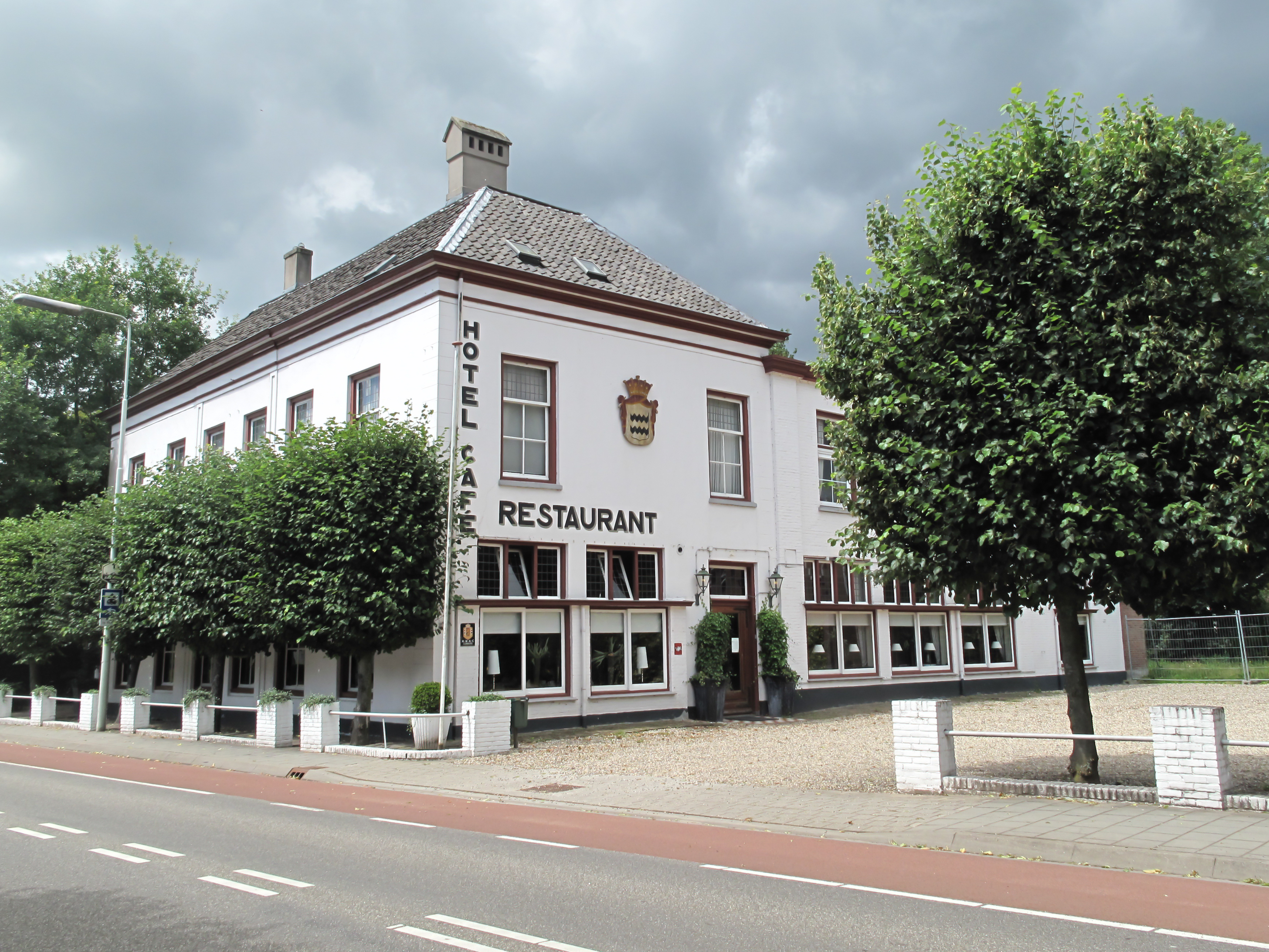
Monumental hotel building at the Hoofdstraat

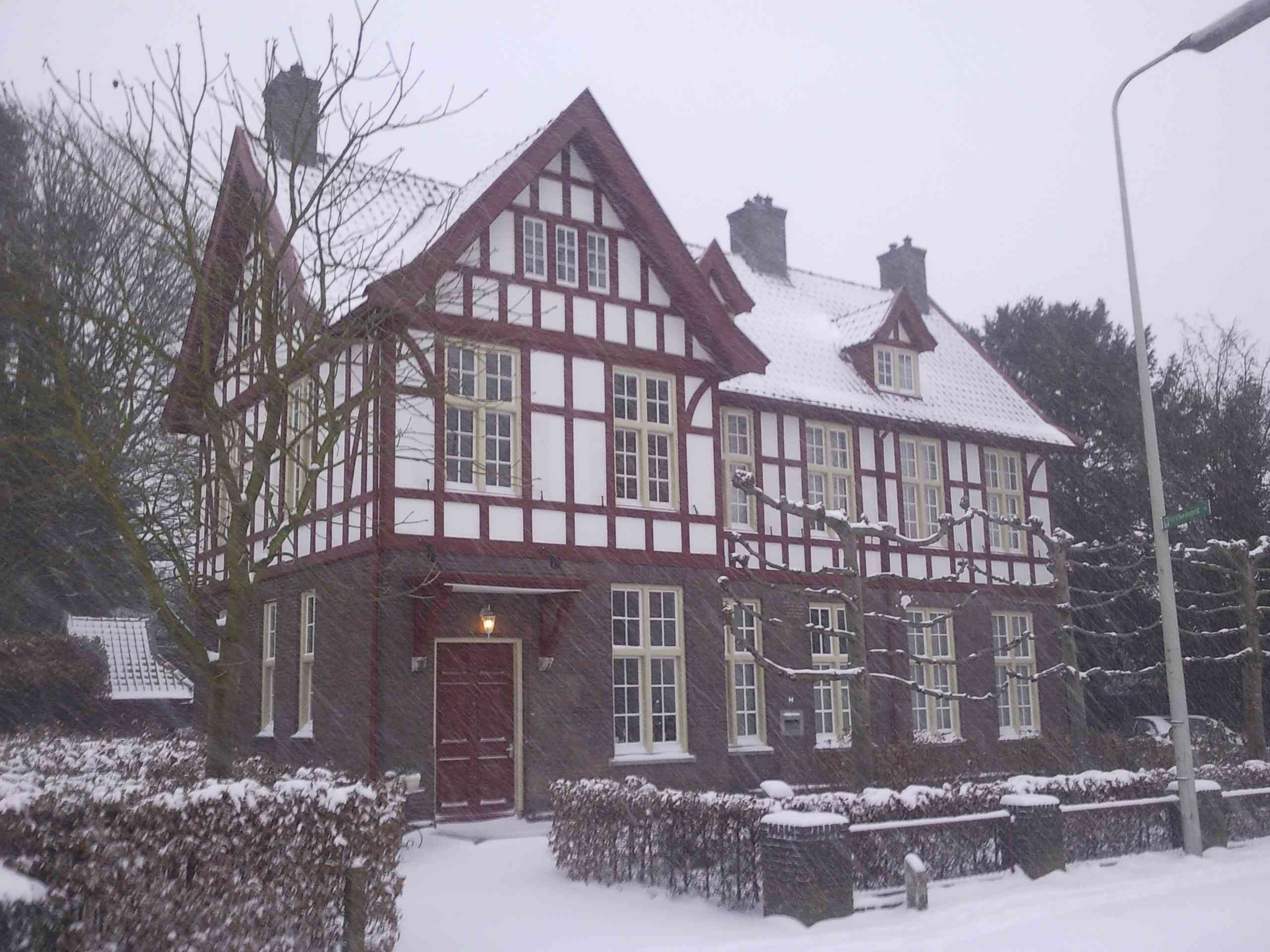
Post office in De Steeg

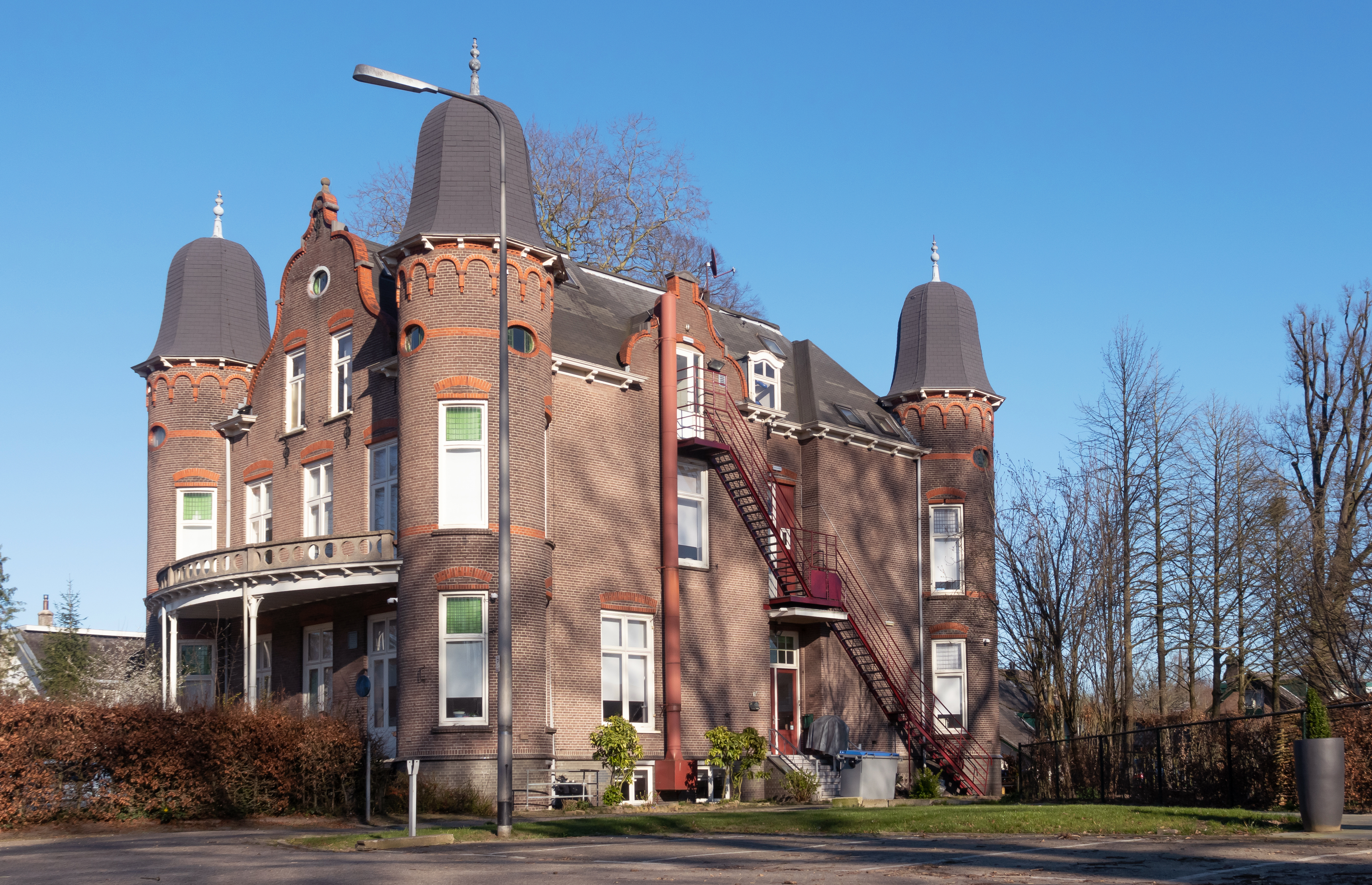
Huize Rhederpark

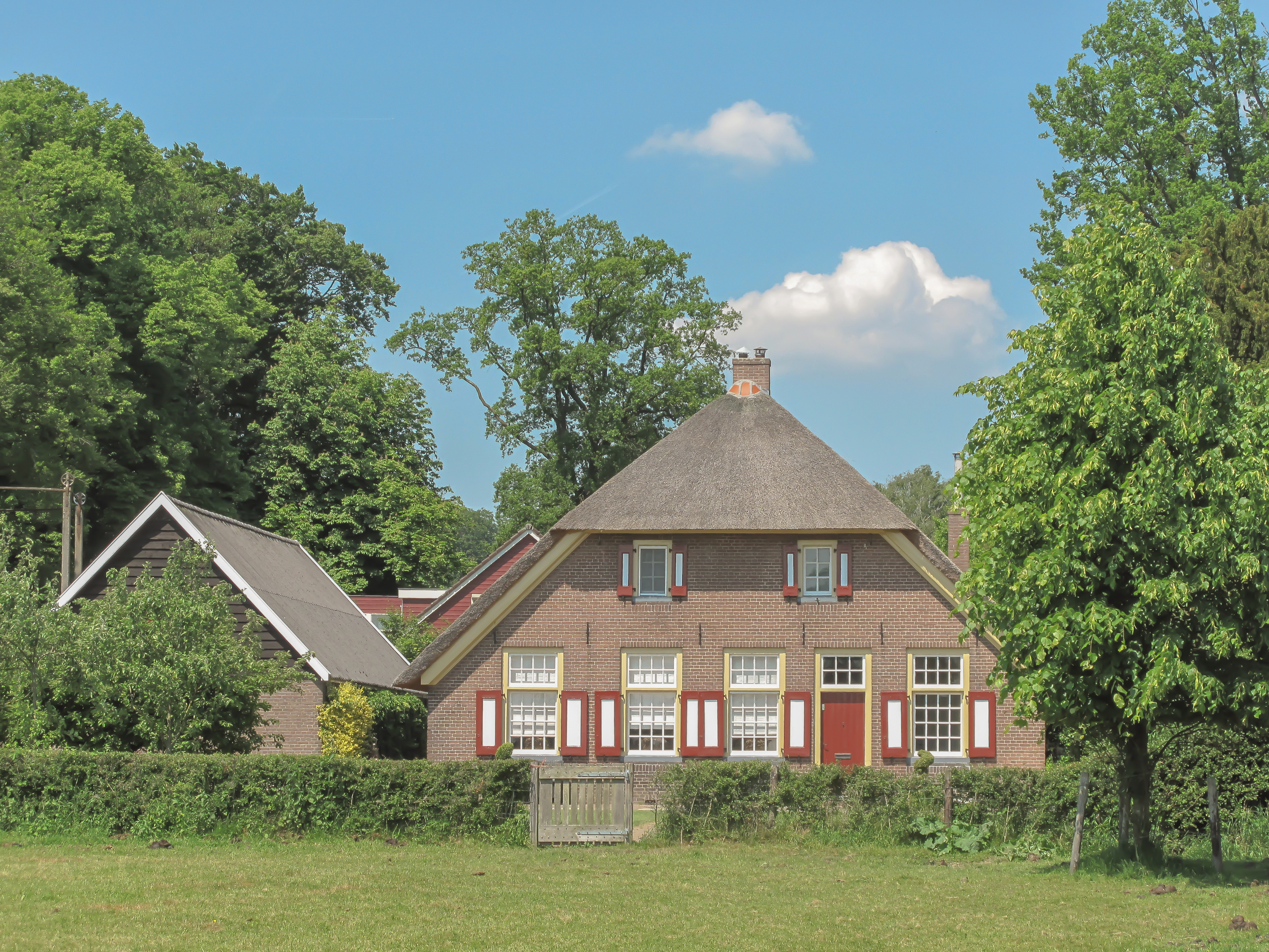
Monumental building at the Oversteeg 14

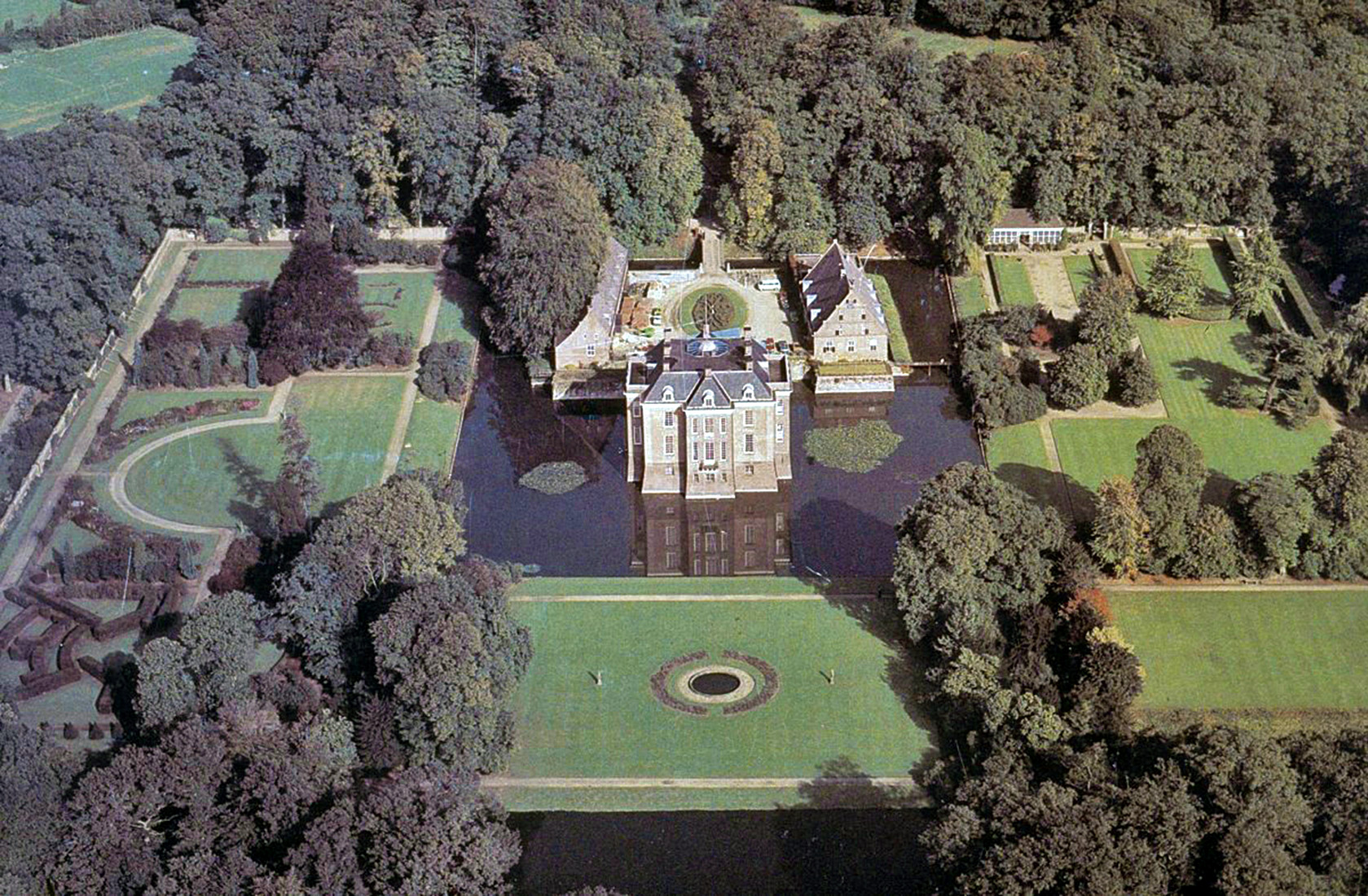
Middachten Castle

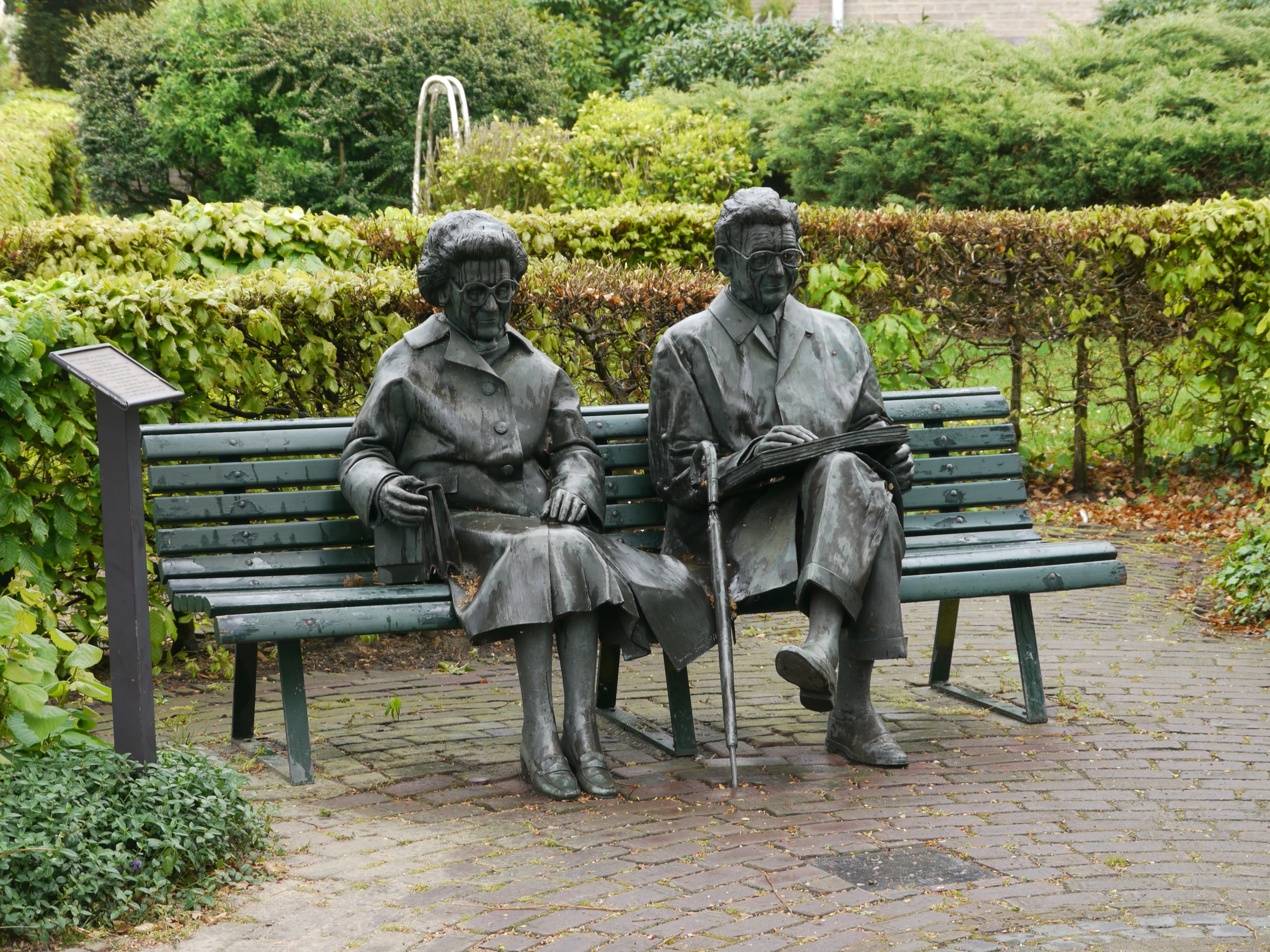
Statue Simon Carmiggelt and his wife Tiny
