= Daniël de Blocq van Scheltinga =

Dutch Nazi politician (1903–1962)

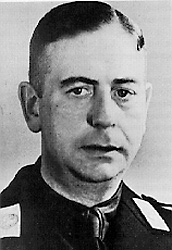
Daniël de Blocq van Scheltinga

Jonkheer Daniël de Blocq van Scheltinga (Velp, 23 November 1903 – Düsseldorf, 26 June 1962) was a Dutch Nazi politician.

== Before the war ==
After a difficult school period, he finally graduated from highschool at the age of 21. Through his marriage in 1928 with a daughter of the Prussian family von der Goltz, whose father had been a general in World War I, he became interested in Nazism and Adolf Hitler's policy of rearmament. Already in 1932, he and his wife joined the NSB, the Dutch equivalent of the German Nazi Party. He soon became engaged in the political work for the party, which ultimately resulted in being fired from his regular job. In 1935, he unsuccessfully tried to be elected as an NSB-candidate to the States-Provincial of Utrecht.

In 1937, he became the personal assistant of the co-founder of the NSB Cornelis van Geelkerken. Although he was a very dedicated and loyal member of the party, he gained the nickname Dom Daantje (literally: Dumb Danny) for his naivety. Nonetheless, he played an important role in the organization and administration of the NSB party. In 1937, he also was an NSB delegate to the Nazi Party convention in Nürnberg.

== During the war ==
During the German invasion of the Netherlands in 1940, he and his wife were arrested by the Dutch government. After the Dutch army surrendered, he was released, and the head of the NSB, Anton Mussert, made him to the head of the General Affairs section of the party. In this function, De Blocq van Scheltinga became one of the closest advisers of Mussert, and also supported him in his internal power struggle against Meinoud Rost van Tonningen, who believed that the Netherlands ought to be a part of a Greater Germany.

In 1942 he was appointed as mayor of Wassenaar. At the time, this post was considered important because of the large number of German officials and high-ranking NSB party members living in the municipality. He had his political rivals removed from the administration and replaced them with NSB members. One of the first rules he implemented consisted in ordering the German authorities to arrest and deport all the Jewish citizens from Wassenaar. After the assassination of the Nazi collaborator Hendrik Seyffardt, de Blocq van Scheltinga ordered a few dozen young to be arrested.

== After the war ==
At the end of the war in 1945, he was arrested and initially sentenced to death. Later this verdict was changed into a 20-year prison sentence. In addition, most of his property was confiscated. In 1953 he was released (pardoned by then queen Juliana) and in 1958 he moved to live in Germany.
