= Dieren railway station =

Railway station located in Dieren, Netherlands

Dieren
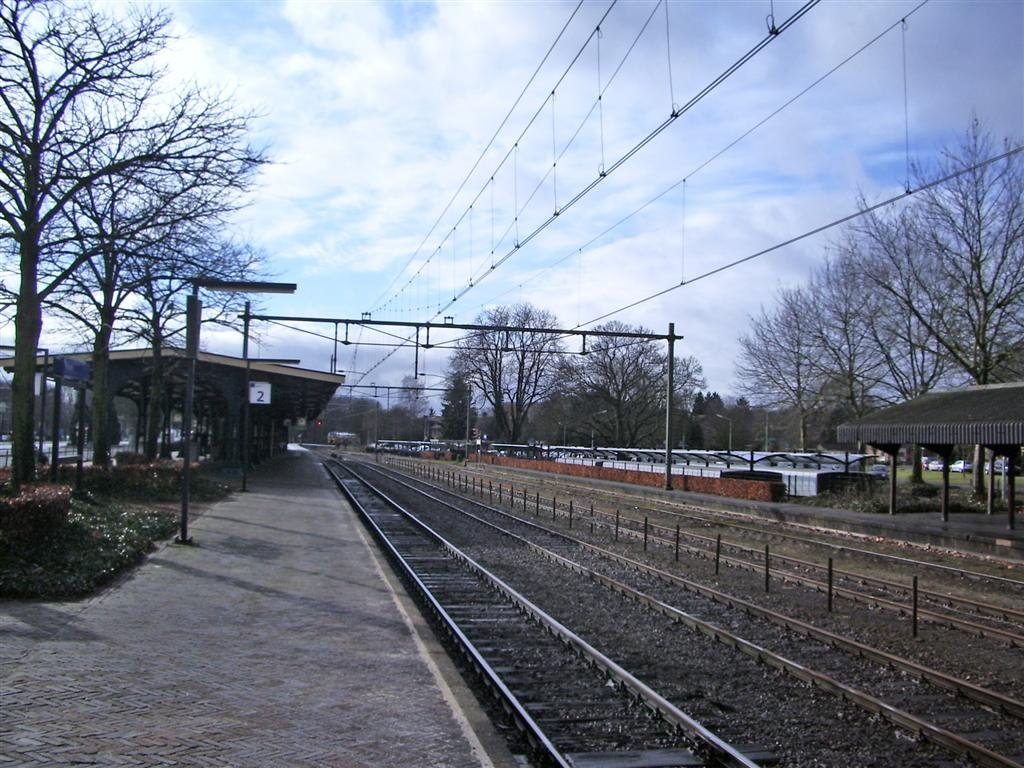

General information
- Location: Netherlands
- Coordinates: 52°02′42″N 6°06′12″E
- Line: Arnhem–Leeuwarden railway

History
- Opened: 1865

Services
Preceding station	Nederlandse Spoorwegen	Following station
Arnhem Centraal towards Roosendaal	NS Intercity 3600	Zutphen towards Zwolle
Rheden towards Wijchen	NS Sprinter 7600	Brummen towards Zutphen
Location
- Location within Netherlands

Dieren is a railway station located in Dieren, Netherlands. The station was opened on 2 February 1865 and is located on the Arnhem–Leeuwarden railway. Until 1976, the official name was Dieren-Doesburg. The train services are operated by Nederlandse Spoorwegen. Behind the station there is a steam railway that runs from Dieren to Apeldoorn via Beekbergen operated by the Veluwsche Stoomtrein Maatschappij over the old passenger line to Apeldoorn (opened in 1887, closed in 1950).

== Train services ==
Route	Service type	Operator	Notes
Roosendaal - Zwolle	Intercity	NS	2x per hour
(Wijchen -) Nijmegen - Arnhem - Zutphen	Local ("Sprinter")	NS	2x per hour - 1x per hour after 22:00 and on Sundays.

== Bus services ==
Line	Route	Operator	Notes
26	(Arnhem CS - Arnhem Velperpoort - Arnhem Presikhaaf - Velp Zuid - Lathum - Giesbeek - Angerlo -) Doesburg - Dieren	Breng	Mon-Fri: 2x per hour between Doesburg, Kraakselaan and Dieren, but only 1x per hour between Arnhem and Doesburg, Kraakselaan. On evenings and weekends, this bus only operates between Doesburg, Kraakselaan and Dieren.
43	Apeldoorn Station - Apeldoorn Zuid - Beekbergen - Loenen - Eerbeek - Laag-Soeren - Dieren - Ellecom - De Steeg - Rheden - Velp Zuid - Arnhem Presikhaaf - Arnhem Het Broek - Arnhem CS	Breng, Syntus Gelderland, TCR (only a couple of runs)	Mostly a joint operation between Breng and Syntus Gelderland because the line runs through both service areas.
71	Eerbeek - Laag-Soeren - Dieren - Rozendaal Rhedens Lyceum	Breng	1 run during both rush hours. Does not run during Summer Break.
524	Dieren - Spankeren	Breng	Mon-Sat during daytime hours only.
525	Dieren Station - Centrum (town centre) - West	Breng	Mon-Sat during daytime hours only.
526	Dieren Station - Centrum (town centre) - Noord	Breng	Mon-Sat during daytime hours only.
843	Arnhem Willemsplein → Arnhem Velperpoort → Arnhem Presikhaaf → Velp → Rheden → De Steeg → Ellecom → Dieren → Doesburg	Breng	Only two runs during Saturday late nights. A special tariff applies.
