= Middachten Castle =

Dutch castle

Coordinates: 52°01′09″N 6°04′11″E

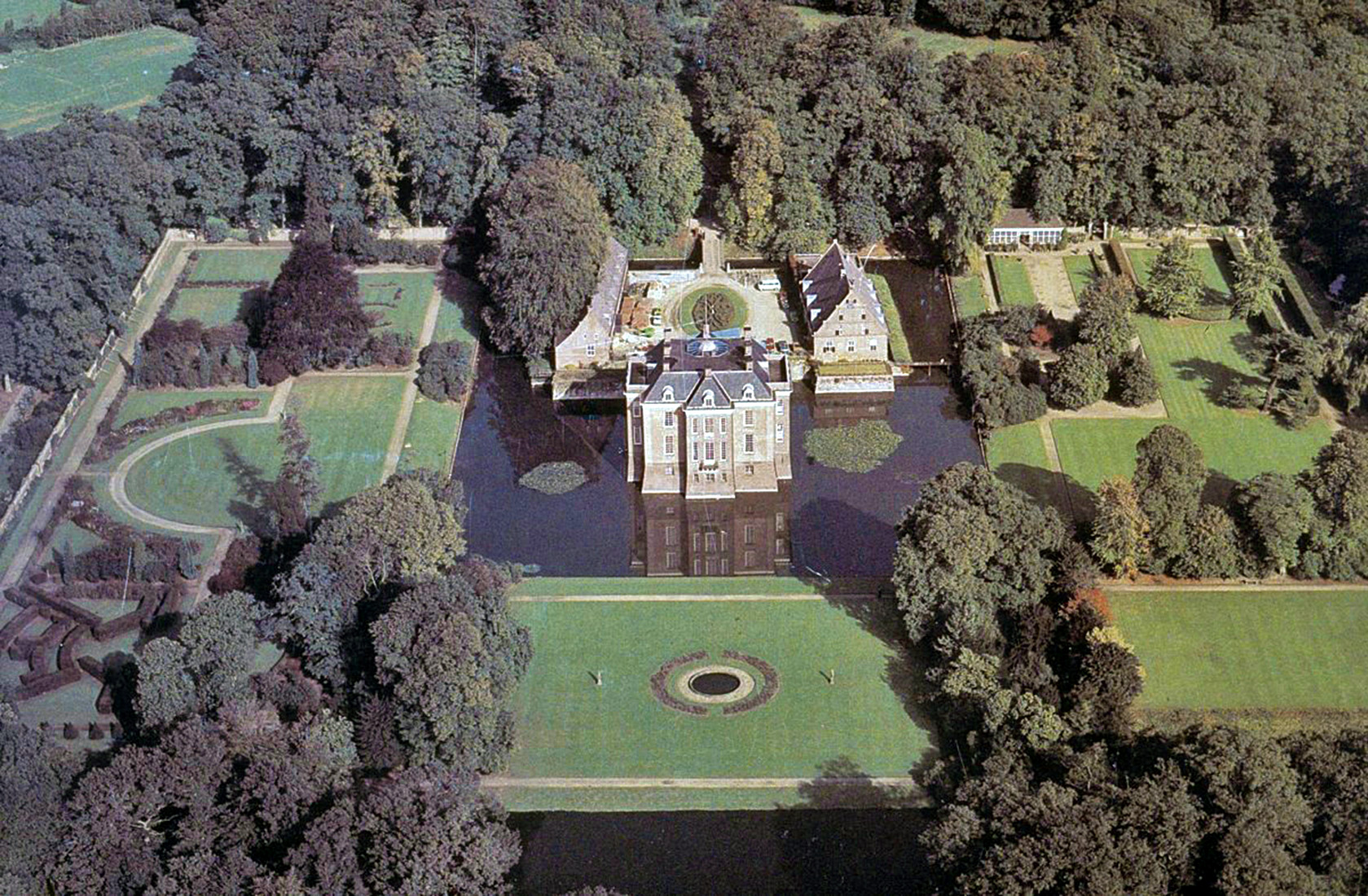
Middachten Castle, aerial view

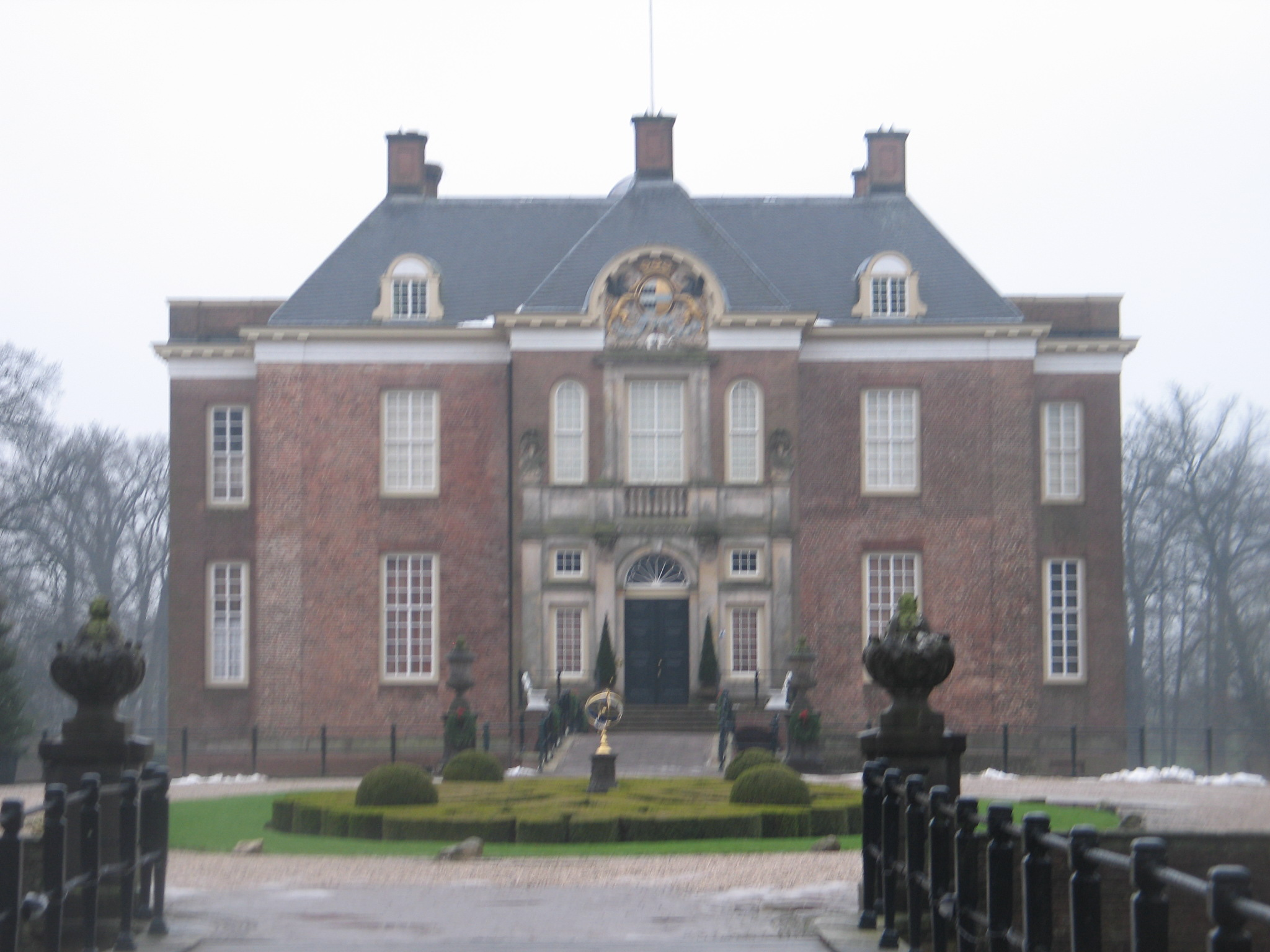
Middachten Castle, front view

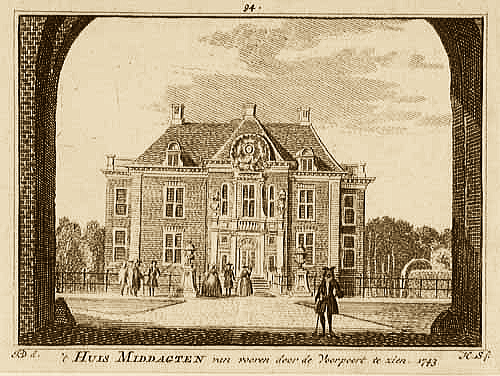
Middachten Castle, front view through the gate, 1743, by Jan de Beijer

Middachten Castle (Dutch: Kasteel Middachten) is a monumental manor house, located on the Middachten estate, De Steeg, Netherlands. The current building dates from 1693-1698. The castle is a rijksmonument since October 11, 2004, and is part of the Top 100 Dutch heritage sites.

== History ==
The first mention of a castle on this location dates from 1190, owned by Jacobus de Mithdac. Early in the 14th century Everardus van Steenre transferred its ownership to Reinald, count of Gelre. Everardus then got the castle back as a loan in 1357. The castle would remain with this family until 1625. During this time the castle was destroyed and rebuilt several times. In 1673 Stadtholder William III conquered the city of Bonn, making the occupying French troops retreat, who destroyed the castle. Godard van Ginkel and his spouse Ursula van Raesfelt then had the castle rebuilt, based on the example of Het Loo Palace in Apeldoorn. It was designed by Jacobus Roman (1640-1716) and Steven Vennecool (1657-1719).

After the castle was rebuilt in 1698 a garden was built, based on the garden in Versailles in the period 1700-1725. In the late 18th century British style gardens became fashion, and the gardens were redone in this style. In 1900 count and countess Bentinck-Van Heeckeren of Wassenaer had the gardens partially rebuilt in the original style by Hugo Poortman (a student of French garden artist Édouard André).

The castle used to have an extensive estate. However these are no longer owned by the owners of the castle. Buildings that used to belong to the castle estate can be recognized by the red and white coloring, for example the Post office in De Steeg.

== See also ==
- List of castles in the Netherlands
