= Velp railway station =

Railway station in the Netherlands

Velp
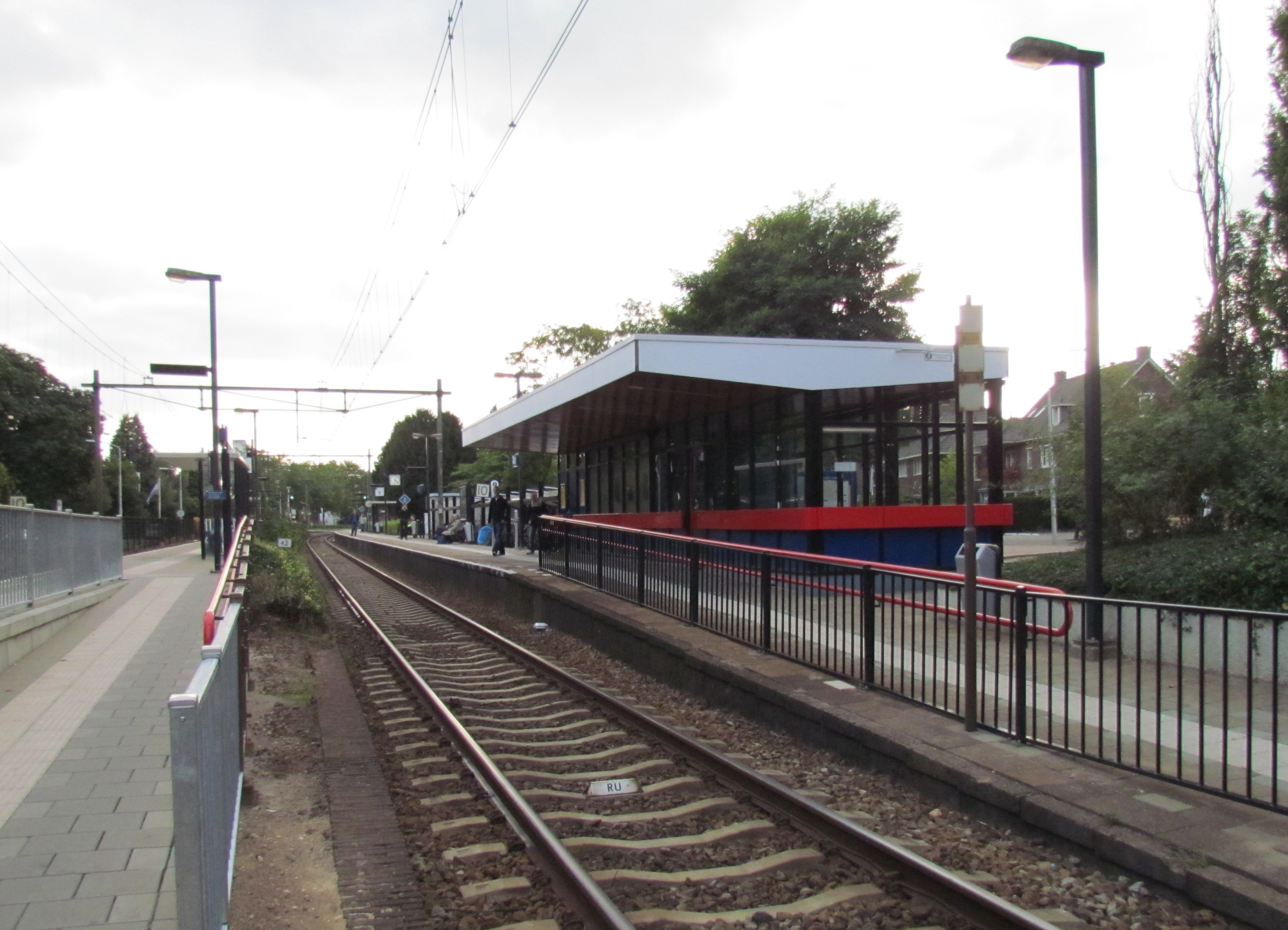

General information
- Location: Netherlands
- Coordinates: 51°59′41″N 5°58′48″E
- Line: Arnhem–Leeuwarden railway

History
- Opened: 1865

Services
Preceding station	Nederlandse Spoorwegen	Following station
Arnhem Presikhaaf towards Wijchen	NS Sprinter 7600	Rheden towards Zutphen
Location
- Location within Netherlands

Velp is a railway station located in Velp, Netherlands. The station was opened in 1865 and is located on the Arnhem–Leeuwarden railway. The train services are operated by Nederlandse Spoorwegen.

== Train services ==
Route	Service type	Operator	Notes
Arnhem - Doetinchem - Winterswijk	Local ("Sprinter")	Arriva	2x per hour (only 1x per hour after 20:00, on Saturday mornings and Sundays)
Arnhem - Doetinchem	Local ("Sprinter")	Breng	2x per hour - Mon-Fri only. Not on evenings.
(Wijchen -) Nijmegen - Arnhem - Zutphen	Local ("Sprinter")	NS	2x per hour - 1x per hour after 22:00 and on Sundays.

== Bus services ==
Line	Route	Operator	Notes
1	Oosterbeek - Arnhem CS - Arnhem Velperpoort - Velp	Breng	
843	Arnhem Willemsplein → Arnhem Velperpoort → Arnhem Presikhaaf → Velp → Rheden → De Steeg → Ellecom → Dieren → Doesburg	Breng	Only two runs during Saturday late nights. A special tariff applies.
