= List of shipwrecks in 2010 =

The list of shipwrecks in 2010 includes ships sunk, foundered, grounded, or otherwise lost during 2010.

table of contents
2010
Jan	Feb	Mar	Apr
May	Jun	Jul	Aug
Sep	Oct	Nov	Dec

== January ==
=== 5 January ===
List of shipwrecks: 5 January 2010
Ship	State	Description
Ady Gil	New Zealand	The Sea Shepherd Conservation Society trimaran was damaged severely in a collision with the whaler Shōnan Maru 2 (Japan). Her six crew were rescued by the vessel Bob Barker (Netherlands). The vessel sinks on 7 January despite efforts to tow it to port.

=== 13 January ===
List of shipwrecks: 13 January 2010
Ship	State	Description
Ortegal Uno	Germany	The 29.36-metre (96 ft 4 in) fishing vessel developed a list in heavy weather on 12 January, capsized in the Atlantic Ocean and sank west of Ireland (52°20′N 14°23′W) the next day. Her crew was rescued by Ortegal Tres (Germany).

=== 16 January ===
List of shipwrecks: 16 January 2010
Ship	State	Description
Atlantic Mist	United States	The 185-foot (56.4 m) fishing vessel – a former PCE-842-class patrol craft – was scuttled as an artificial reef in 100 feet (30 m) of water in the North Atlantic Ocean at 38°31.063′N 074°30.271′W, approximately 26 nautical miles (48 km; 30 mi) southeast of Indian River Inlet, Delaware, and equidistant from Cape May, New Jersey, Indian River Inlet, and Ocean City, Maryland.
Frieda Marie	United States	The retired 77-foot (23.5 m), 78-foot (23.8 m), or 85-foot (25.9 m) (sources disagree) fishing trawler – a shrimper – was scuttled as an artificial reef in the North Atlantic Ocean off the coast of Delaware at 38°40.540′N 074°43.957′W.

=== 25 January ===
List of shipwrecks: 25 January 2010
Ship	State	Description
Unnamed boat	Philippines	The boat sank in rough waters off the province of Bataan with only two crew rescued by a passing vessel. Eight fishermen were reported missing.

=== 30 January ===
List of shipwrecks: 30 January 2010
Ship	State	Description
Unnamed boat	India	The boat capsized in the Godavari River, Andhra Pradesh, with 12 dead and 40 reported missing.

== February ==
=== 17 February ===
List of shipwrecks: 17 February 2010
Ship	State	Description
Concordia	Barbados	The barquentine capsized and sank 550 kilometres (300 nmi) off Rio de Janeiro, Brazil.

=== 19 February ===
List of shipwrecks: 17 February 2010
Ship	State	Description
Becky Thatcher	United States	The historic sternwheel texas-deck paddle steamer sank at her mooring in the Ohio River at Neville Island in Pittsburgh, Pennsylvania, after a heavy snowfall and became a total loss.

=== 21 February ===
List of shipwrecks: 21 February 2010
Ship	State	Description
Angeln	Antigua and Barbuda	The container ship capsized and sank off Saint Lucia.

=== Unknown date ===
List of shipwrecks: Unknown date 2010
Ship	State	Description
Platinum II	United States	The cargo ship ran aground near Gopnath, Pakistan, and broke her back. She was scrapped in situ.

== March ==
=== 10 March ===
List of shipwrecks: 10 March 2010
Ship	State	Description
Sandy Point	United States	The retired 85-foot (25.9 m) tug was scuttled as an artificial reef in the North Atlantic Ocean off the coast of Delaware at 38°40.540′N 074°43.957′W.

=== 11 March ===
List of shipwrecks: 11 March 2010
Ship	State	Description
Ben My Chree	United Kingdom	The fishing vessel started to sink 17 nautical miles (31 km) NE of the Isles of Scilly and four of the crew taken off by RNAS Culdrose helicopter and one by the St Mary's relief lifeboat Daniel L Gibson. The ship was taken in tow by fisheries protection vessel St Piran (United Kingdom) and sank 1 nautical mile (1.9 km) off Gwennap Head, Cornwall.

=== 26 March ===
List of shipwrecks: 26 March 2010
Ship	State	Description
ROKS Cheonan	Republic of Korea Navy	The Pohang-class corvette sank off Baengnyeong Island after it was attacked.

=== 31 March ===
List of shipwrecks: 31 March 2010
Ship	State	Description
Titanic	Saint Kitts and Nevis	The motor yacht sprang a leak 108 nautical miles (200 km) south east of Saint Croix. Her crew were taken off by USCGC Chincoteague (United States Navy), which took Titanic in tow. She was taken in to Fredrikstad, United States Virgin Islands.

=== Unknown date ===
List of shipwrecks: Unknown date 2010
Ship	State	Description
Alta	Ecuador	The yacht ran aground entering the harbour of Puerto Ayora, Galápagos Islands, and was declared a constructive total loss.

== April ==
=== 3 April ===
List of shipwrecks: 3 April 2010
Ship	State	Description
Shen Neng 1	People's Republic of China	The cargo ship ran aground off Great Keppel Island, Australia. She was refloated on 12 April. The Federal Court of Australia is seeking damages of $120 million from Shenzhen Energy Transport for damage to the reef.

=== 20 April ===
List of shipwrecks: 20 April 2010
Ship	State	Description
Northern Belle	United States	The fishing vessel sank at 59°10′N 146°47′W, approximately 50 miles (80 km) south of Montague Island in the Gulf of Alaska. The captain died of hypothermia and his pet Cocker Spaniel went down with the ship, but the other three crewmen survived until a United States Coast Guard helicopter rescue crew arrived.

=== 22 April ===
List of shipwrecks: 22 April 2010
Ship	State	Description
Deepwater Horizon	Marshall Islands	The oil rig sank two days after an explosion and fire.

== May ==
=== 2 May ===
List of shipwrecks: 2 May 2010
Ship	State	Description
Bright Century	Japan	The cargo ship collided with Sea Success (Liberia) 23 nautical miles (43 km; 26 mi) east of the Shangdong Peninsula (37°38′N 123°04′E) and sank. All 23 crew members were rescued.

=== 6 May ===
List of shipwrecks: 6 May 2010
Ship	State	Description
Unnamed longboat	Democratic Republic of the Congo	The longboat capsized on a river in Maniema killing at least 20 people, with 60 more missing.

=== 7 May ===
List of shipwrecks: 7 May 2010
Ship	State	Description
McGinty	United States	The retired 65-foot (19.8 m) fishing trawler was scuttled as an artificial reef in the North Atlantic Ocean 2 nautical miles (3.7 km; 2.3 mi) off Mantoloking, New Jersey, in 80 feet (24 m) of water at 40°03.486′N 073°59.344′W.

=== 8 May ===
List of shipwrecks: 8 May 2010
Ship	State	Description
Andrew J. Barberi	United States	The passenger ferry collided with the terminal at Staten Island, New York. More than 60 people were injured.

=== 20 May ===
List of shipwrecks: 20 May 2010
Ship	State	Description
Cape Spencer	United States	The 47-foot (14.3 m) fishing vessel sank in Prince William Sound 3 nautical miles (5.6 km; 3.5 mi) south of Montague Island on the south-central coast of Alaska after her engine room flooded. Wearing survival suits, her crew of four abandoned ship in a life raft and was rescued by a United States Coast Guard Sikorsky MH-60 Jayhawk helicopter.

== June ==
=== 9 June ===
List of shipwrecks: 9 June 2010
Ship	State	Description
Lord Rank	United Kingdom	The ketch sank after hitting rocks off Ballycastle the previous day.

=== 12 June ===
List of shipwrecks: 12 June 2010
Ship	State	Description
Howard Bahnsen	United States	The retired 90-foot (27.4 m) barge was scuttled as an artificial reef in the North Atlantic Ocean off Townsends Inlet, New Jersey, at 39°06.543′N 074°36.249′W.

=== 23 June ===
List of shipwrecks: 15 June 2010
Ship	State	Description
Fu Ping Yuan	China	The cargo ship was run into by CS Crane (Panama) off Incheon, South Korea and sank. She was refloated on 6 November.

== July ==
=== 2 July ===
List of shipwrecks: 2 July 2010
Ship	State	Description
Yeoman Bontrup	Bahamas	The cargo ship suffered an onboard fire that spread to her engine room at Glensanda Quarry, Loch Linnhe, Scotland. The crew abandoned and the fire spread to her accommodation, severely damaging the ship.

=== 6 July ===
List of shipwrecks: 6 July 2010
Ship	State	Description
Cerro Alegre	Chile	The cargo ship was driven ashore in a storm at Valparaíso.

=== 7 July ===
List of shipwrecks: 7 July 2010
Ship	State	Description
Unnamed DUKW	United States	The DUKW became disabled in the Delaware River in Philadelphia after an onboard fire. The tourist boat was then struck by a barge and sank immediately in 50 feet (15 m) of water. Thirty-five passengers and two crew members were recovered alive and two members of a Hungarian tour group died.

=== 10 July ===
List of shipwrecks: 10 July 2010
Ship	State	Description
USS New Orleans	United States Navy	The decommissioned Iwo Jima-class amphibious assault ship was sunk as a target in the Pacific Ocean, sinking after being hit by five 2,000 lb (907 kg) GBU-10 precision bombs in the Pacific during the RIMPAC 2010 exercise.

=== 14 July ===
List of shipwrecks: 14 July 2010
Ship	State	Description
USS Monticello	United States Navy	The decommissioned Thomaston-class dock landing ship was sunk as a target in the Pacific Ocean 70 nautical miles (130 km) off Kauai, Hawaii, on 14 July 2010 by aircraft of Patrol Squadron 4 (VP-4) and Patrol Squadron 40 (VP-40) (both United States Navy) during the RIMPAC 2010 exercise.

=== 15 July ===
List of shipwrecks: 15 July 2010
Ship	State	Description
John Henry	United States	The 34-foot (10.4 m) gillnetter sank in central Cook Inlet on the south-central coast of Alaska. A United States Coast Guard helicopter rescued her crew of two.
Wealthy Globe	Vanuatu	The crane ship was driven ashore at Vũng Tàu, Vietnam. She was later refloated and taken into Ho Chi Minh City.

=== 29 July ===
List of shipwrecks: 29 July 2010
Ship	State	Description
Unnamed boat	Democratic Republic of the Congo	The boat capsized in the Kasai River with at least eighty people killed.

=== 31 July ===
List of shipwrecks: 31 July 2010
Ship	State	Description
Unnamed boat	Uganda	The boat capsized on Lake Albert during a storm, with the loss of at least thirty-three lives.

== August ==
=== 7 August ===
List of shipwrecks: 7 August 2010
Ship	State	Description
MSC Chitra, Khalijia III	Panama; Saint Kitts and Nevis	The container ship was involved in a collision with the bulk carrier Khalija III off Mumbai, India. Both ships were left listing heavily. MSC Chitra was beached near the Prong Reef Lighthouse with a 75° list. Her crew were rescued by the tug Vamsee III (India). She was later salvaged. Khalija III was subsequently declared a constructive total loss and was scrapped at Mumbai in 2014.

=== 9 August ===
List of shipwrecks: 9 August 2010
Ship	State	Description
Unnamed ferry	Indonesia	The ferry sank off Flores. At least eleven were killed and 32 were reported missing.

== September ==
=== 3 September ===
List of shipwrecks: 3 September 2010
Ship	State	Description
Nanny	Canada	The tanker ran aground at Gjoa Haven, Nunavut, Canada.

=== 5 September ===
List of shipwrecks: 5 September 2010
Ship	State	Description
Unidentified barge	United States	The retired 43-foot (13.1 m) barge was scuttled as an artificial reef in the North Atlantic Ocean 3.1 nautical miles (5.7 km; 3.6 mi) off Barnegat, New Jersey, at 39°45.050′N 074°01.400′W.

=== 20 September ===
List of shipwrecks: 20 September 2010
Ship	State	Description
USS Acadia	United States Navy	USS Acadia sinking The decommissioned Yellowstone-class destroyer tender sank in the Pacific Ocean off Guam after being under bombardment since 19 September as a target for ships and aircraft during a naval exercise.

=== 23 September ===
List of shipwrecks: 23 September 2010
Ship	State	Description
Ocean Blue	Bolivia	The cargo ship foundered in the Caribbean Sea south of the Dominican Republic (17°07′03″N 69°50′00″W). Her seven crew were rescued by Adrian (Liberia).

=== 29 September ===
List of shipwrecks: 29 September 2010
Ship	State	Description
Huiying 168	China	The cargo ship capsized and sank off Pingtan City with the loss of twelve of her fifteen crew.

== October ==
=== 5 October ===
List of shipwrecks: 5 October 2010
Ship	State	Description
Sail Queen	Russia	The cargo ship ran aground and was holed. She was consequently beached on the Turkish coast.

=== 7 October ===
List of shipwrecks: 7 October 2010
Ship	State	Description
Mystic	Canada	The cargo ship struck a submerged object and consequently foundered off Damas Cay, Bahamas. Her ten crew survived.

=== 8 October ===
List of shipwrecks: 8 October 2010
Ship	State	Description
YM Uranus	Malta	The chemical tanker collided with the bulk carrier Hanjin Rizhao (Panama) off Brittany, France, and was reported to be sinking. All 13 crew were rescued.

=== 9 October ===
List of shipwrecks: 9 October 2010
Ship	State	Description
Lisco Gloria	Lithuania	The ferry caught fire in the Fehmarn Belt. She was declared a constructive total loss and subsequently scrapped.

=== 12 October ===
List of shipwrecks: 12 October 2010
Ship	State	Description
Mindoro	Greece	The ship collided with Jork Ranger (Cyprus) 20 nautical miles (37 km) off Scheveningen, Netherlands. Mindoro was reported to have been holed and some of its cargo of kerosene lost.

=== 16 October ===
List of shipwrecks: 16 October 2010
Ship	State	Description
Egholm II	Denmark	The ferry foundered off Aarhus whilst under tow.

=== 19 October ===
List of shipwrecks: 19 October 2010
Ship	State	Description
Dili Star	Panama	Typhoon Megi: The cargo ship foundered in the Taiwan Strait off Kaohsiung, Taiwan. Her twelve crew were rescued by a Republic of China Air Force helicopter.
Xin Yi	Panama	Typhoon Megi: The cement carrier foundered off Hsinchu, Taiwan with the loss of four of her 22 crew.

=== 20 October ===
List of shipwrecks: 20 October 2010
Ship	State	Description
Sheng Jai 16	Cambodia	Typhoon Megi: The cargo ship foundered in the Taiwan Strait with the loss of five of her thirteen crew.

=== 22 October ===
List of shipwrecks: 22 October 2010
Ship	State	Description
HMS Astute	Royal Navy	The Astute-class submarine ran aground off the Isle of Skye.
Karya Terang	Indonesia	The ferry foundered off the coast of East Nusa Tenggara with the loss of about 30 lives. There were 44 survivors.
Stadt Fürth	Germany	The cargo ship collided with a small ferryboat (Netherlands) in a canal between Breukelen and Nieuwer ter Aa, Utrecht. The ferryboat capsizes and its captain is reported missing. His body is later recovered.
Super Shuttle 22	Philippines	The ro-ro ferry suffered an engine failure and ran aground off Barangay. All 141 passengers were taken off. She was later refloated.

=== 24 October ===
List of shipwrecks: 24 October 2010
Ship	State	Description
Havfrakt	Faroe Islands	The coaster ran aground at Gisundet, Norway.

=== 27 October ===
List of shipwrecks: 27 October 2010
Ship	State	Description
Athena	Faroe Islands	Athena five days after the fire on 9 May 2011 in the Faroe Islands. The factory ship caught fire 230 nautical miles (430 km) south west of the Isles of Scilly.
Jian Fu Star	Panama	The cargo ship capsized and sank in the South China Sea off Oluanpi, Taiwan with the loss of thirteen of her 25 crew.
USNS Saturn	United States Navy	USNS Saturn. The inactivated combat stores ship was sunk as a target in the Atlantic Ocean off the coast of North Carolina by ships and aircraft of the USS George H. W. Bush carrier strike group.

=== 28 October ===
List of shipwrecks: 28 October 2010
Ship	State	Description
Fryderyk Chopin	Poland	The sailing ship lost two masts in gales in the Atlantic Ocean, 86 nautical miles (159 km) south west of the Isles of Scilly.

== November ==
=== 8 November ===
List of shipwrecks: 8 November 2010
Ship	State	Description
Good News	United States	The vessel was wrecked in Alaska's Kodiak Archipelago between Afognak Island and Marmot Island.

=== 9 November ===
List of shipwrecks: 9 November 2010
Ship	State	Description
Jianmao 9	Panama	The bulk carrier foundered in the South China Sea near Lý Sơn island, Vietnam, when the holds took water in heavy weather on a voyage from Malaysia to China. Her 27 crew were rescued by containerships NYK Aquarius and Kota Nelayan.
Nasco Diamond	Panama	The cargo ship capsized and sank south of Iriomote-Jiwa, Japan with the loss of 21 of her 25 crew.

=== 11 November ===
List of shipwrecks: 11 November 2010
Ship	State	Description
Fairplay 22	Antigua and Barbuda	The tug collided with Stena Britannica (United Kingdom) and capsized in the Nieuwe Waterweg with the loss of two of her crew.

=== 30 November ===
List of shipwrecks: 30 November 2010
Ship	State	Description
Karam 1	Sierra Leone	The cargo ship collided with Alessandro DP (Bahamas) and foundered in the Black Sea off Cape Emine, Bulgaria with the loss of five of her ten crew.

== December ==
=== 4 December ===
List of shipwrecks: 4 December 2010
Ship	State	Description
Hong Wei	Panama	The cargo ship sank off the southeast coast of China. Ten members of the 24-person Chinese crew were reported missing. She was carrying 40,000 tons of nickel ore.

=== 5 December ===
List of shipwrecks: 5 December 2010
Ship	State	Description
Anya	Panama	The tug was driven ashore near Kilyos, Turkey. Her six crew were rescued.

=== 8 December ===
List of shipwrecks: 8 December 2010
Ship	State	Description
DK 31	Belgium	The oil skimmer was in collision with Crystal Topaz (Luxembourg) and sank in the Scheldt at Doel, East Flanders with the loss of all three of her crew.
Izzy B	United States	The 34-foot (10.4 m) vessel burned to the waterline at Port Santa Cruz (55°17′N 133°27′W) in Southeast Alaska. The vessel BJ (United States) rescued her crew of two.
RawFaith	United States	RawFaith The schooner-rigged galleon sank in the Atlantic Ocean off the coast of Nantucket. Two crew members were airlifted from the vessel the day before.

=== 10 December ===
List of shipwrecks: 10 December 2010
Ship	State	Description
North Spirit	Saint Vincent and the Grenadines	The cargo ship foundered 52 nautical miles (96 km) off Cape Ortegal, Spain. All crew rescued.

=== 11 December ===
List of shipwrecks: 11 December 2010
Ship	State	Description
Showboat Branson Belle	United States	The passenger ship ran aground while cruising on Table Rock Lake in Missouri, stranding 567 passengers and 76 crew members overnight.

=== 12 December ===
List of shipwrecks: 12 December 2010
Ship	State	Description
Adriatica	Moldova	The cargo ship sank in stormy weather in the Mediterranean Sea off the coast of Israel. The ship's eleven Ukrainian crew members were rescued by a nearby ship. Voice of Russia reported that the vessel sank on "Saturday" (i.e., 11 December).

=== 13 December ===
List of shipwrecks: 13 December 2010
Ship	State	Description
Ann Marie	United States	The tug sank in ice in the Saginaw River.
No. 1 Insung or Number One in Sung	South Korea	The fishing vessel sank in the Southern Ocean some 1,000 nautical miles (1,900 km; 1,200 mi) north of McMurdo Station and 1,080 nautical miles (2,000 km; 1,240 mi) south of New Zealand. Twenty members of the multi-national 42-person crew were rescued and 22 were feared dead.

=== 14 December ===
List of shipwrecks: 14 December 2010
Ship	State	Description
Jolly Amaranto	Italy	The ro-ro cargo ship capsized at Alexandria, Egypt. Her 21 crew survived. She was scrapped in situ in 2011–2012.

=== 15 December ===
List of shipwrecks: 15 December 2010
Ship	State	Description
Refrigerator 604	Russia	The refrigerated cargo ship ran aground and capsized in the Kuril Islands. Her fourteen crew were rescued.
Unnamed boat	Unknown	A boat carrying around ninety Iranian, Iraqi and Kurdish asylum seekers sank off the coast of Christmas Island, killing at least fifty people aboard.

=== 16 December ===
List of shipwrecks: 16 December 2010
Ship	State	Description
Phu Tan	Vietnam	The cargo ship capsized and sank 110 nautical miles (200 km; 130 mi) west of Sanya, China. Twenty-seven fishermen were reported missing.

=== 17 December ===
List of shipwrecks: 17 December 2010
Ship	State	Description
Rand	Togo	The cargo ship was driven ashore at Kumluca, Turkey. Her nine crew were rescued by the Turkish Coast Guard.
Sea Bright	Bolivia	The cargo ship was driven ashore at Antalya, Turkey in a storm and was wrecked.

=== 18 December ===
List of shipwrecks: 18 December 2010
Ship	State	Description
Sandy M	United States	The fishing vessel took on water and was abandoned near Whitney Island, Alaska. Her crew of five were rescued by a United States Coast Guard helicopter crew.

=== 24 December ===
List of shipwrecks: 24 December 2010
Ship	State	Description
Eren Turgut	Turkey	The cargo ship caught fire in the English Channel 18 miles (29 km; 16 nmi) off Dover. Three crew were airlifted to hospital in Margate, where one of them later died. The fire was extinguished but left the ship without propulsion and on emergency lighting only.
Hung Cuong 168	Vietnam	The cargo ship foundered off Fuzhou, China with the loss of four of her seventeen crew.

=== 27 December ===
List of shipwrecks: 27 December 2010
Ship	State	Description
Hangro Ferry 2	South Korea	The ferry foundered in the Yellow Sea off Manjae Island. All on board were rescued.
Serbest K	Turkey	The cargo ship ran aground at Turgutreis. Her twelve crew were rescued.

=== 28 December ===
List of shipwrecks: 28 December 2010
Ship	State	Description
Sea Wolf	United States	The fishing vessel sank 7 nautical miles (13 km) off Cape May, New Jersey, with the loss of one of her two crew.
Van Don 02	Vietnam	The cargo ship foundered in the South China Sea off the coast of Vietnam with the loss of eleven of her 23 crew.

=== 31 December ===
List of shipwrecks: 31 December 2010
Ship	State	Description
Jeljelet Ae	Marshall Islands	The cargo ship sank 90 miles (140 km) northwest of Majuro, Republic of the Marshall Islands, while carrying a cargo of construction materials. Her twenty-person crew were rescued after a multi-national effort.
Kang Bong	North Korea	The cargo ship sank 120 nautical miles (220 km) east of Lianyungang in strong gales. Two crew were killed and 15 were reported missing.
