= Nieuwer-Ter-Aa =

- Village
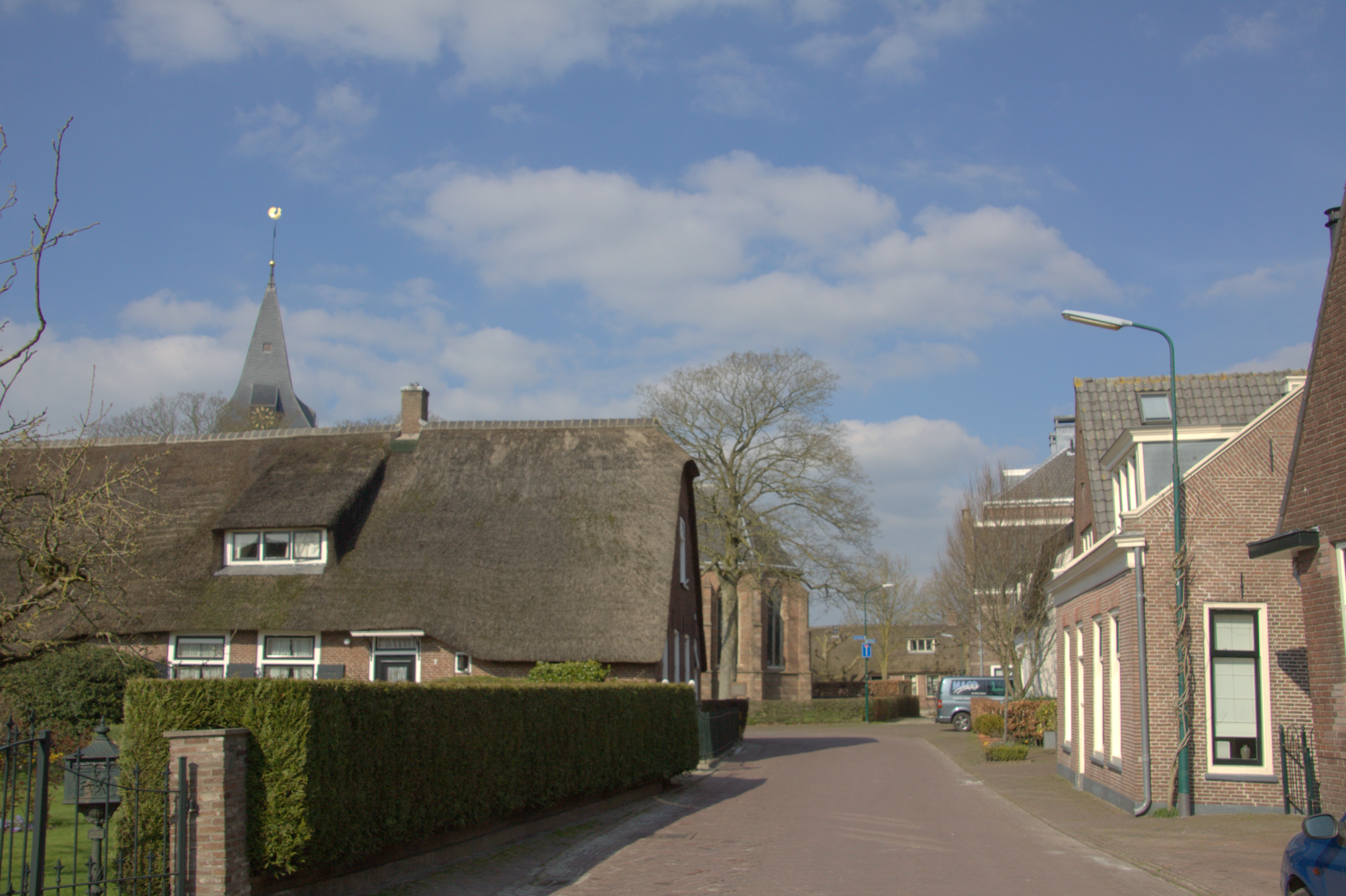
- Street view

- Location in the Netherlands Nieuwer-Ter-Aa (Netherlands)
- Coordinates: 52°11′28″N 4°58′55″E
- Country: Netherlands
- Province: Utrecht
- Municipality: Stichtse Vecht

Area
  - Total: 0.15 km^{2} (0.058 sq mi)
- Elevation: 0 m (0 ft)

Population (2021)
  - Total: 495
  - Density: 3,300/km^{2} (8,500/sq mi)
- Time zone: UTC+1 (CET)
  - Summer (DST): UTC+2 (CEST)
- Postal code: 3626
- Dialing code: 0294

Nieuwer-Ter-Aa (Dutch: Nieuwer Ter Aa) is a village in the Dutch province of Utrecht (province). It is a part of the municipality of Stichtse Vecht, and lies about 13 km northwest of Utrecht.

== History ==
The village was first mentioned in 1556 as Aade, and refers to the Aa River which is a tributary of the Angstel River. Nieuw (new) has been added to distinguish from Oud-Aa. Nieuwer-Ter-Aa developed along the river which was the main route from Amsterdam to Utrecht. The river became obsolete after the Nieuwe Wetering was dug, and dammed near the church in 1527.

Castle Ter Aa was located near the village, and was first described in 1106. The castle was destroyed by the French in 1673. In 1696, the estate Quackenburg was built in its place and was demolished in 1902. There are now residential houses at the site. The tower of the Dutch Reformed Church dates from around 1400. The church in the late-15th century as a replacement of a 12th century church. It was restored in 1956. In 1840, Nieuwer-Ter-Aa was home to 189 people spread over the municipalities Ruwiel and Loenersloot.

The Oukoper Molen is a polder mill from 1644 which remove excess water from the polder. The wind mill was rebuilt in 1839 and served until 1961 when a Diesel powered pumping station rendered it obsolete.

== Gallery ==
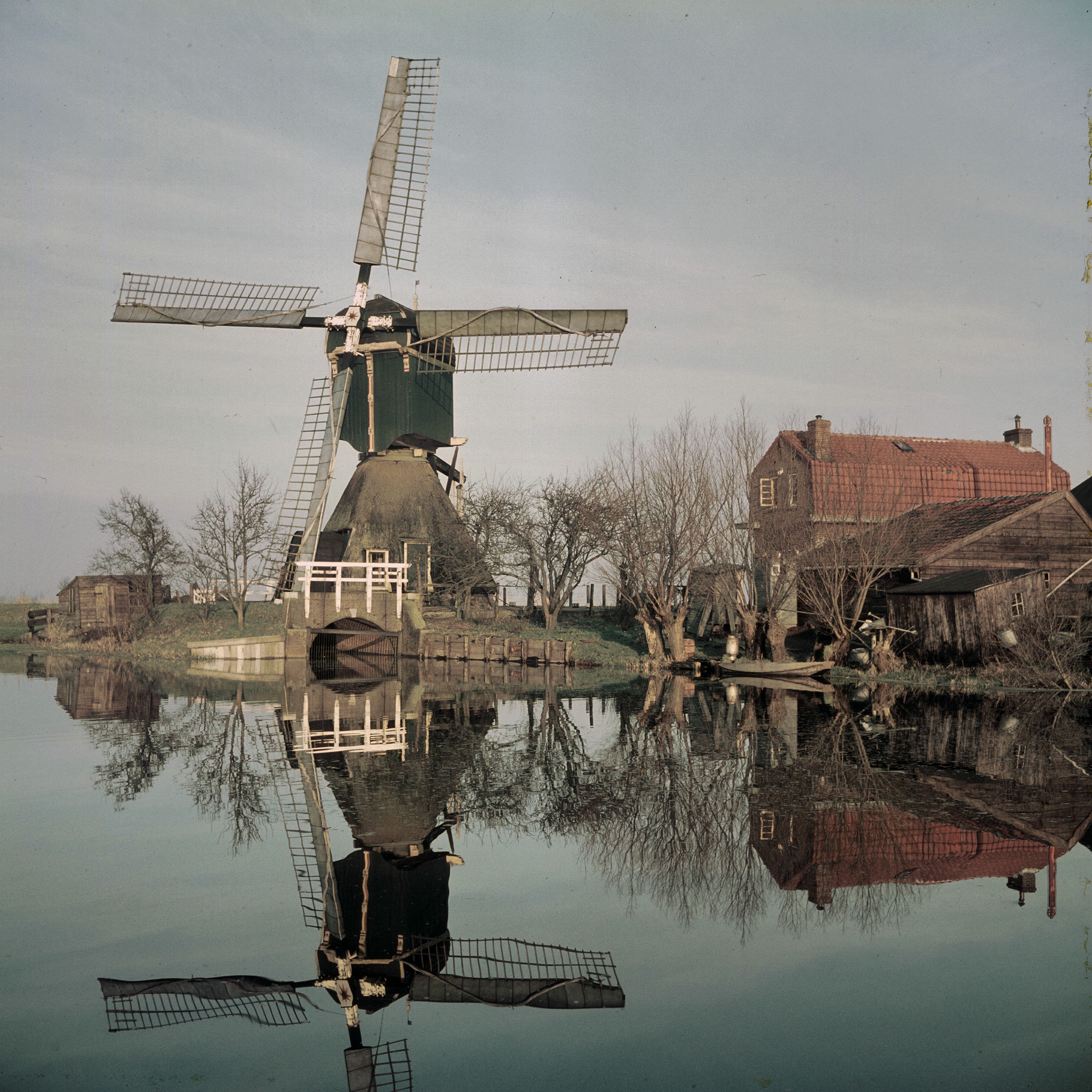
Oukoper Molen

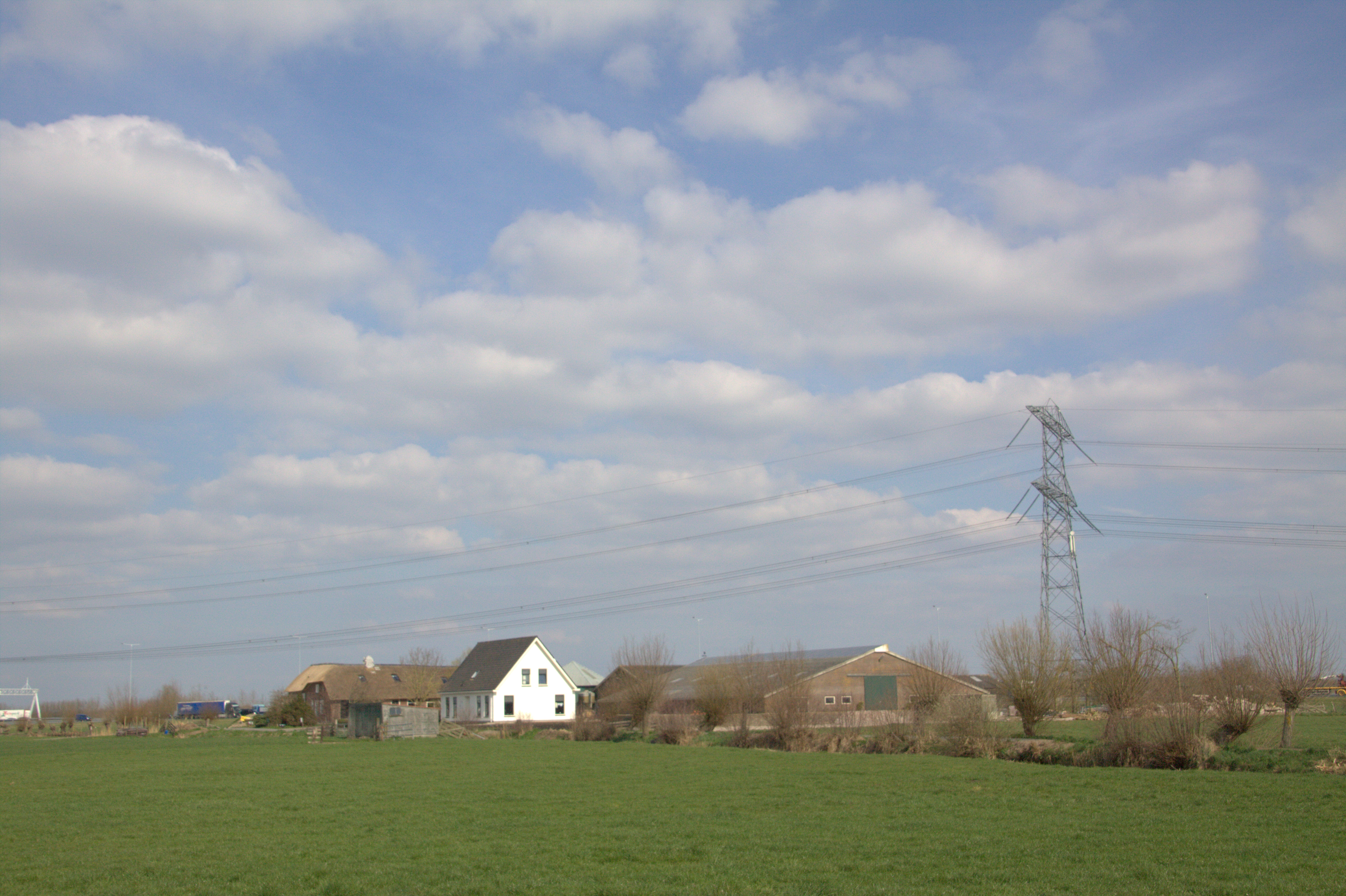
Farms in Nieuwer-Ter-Aa

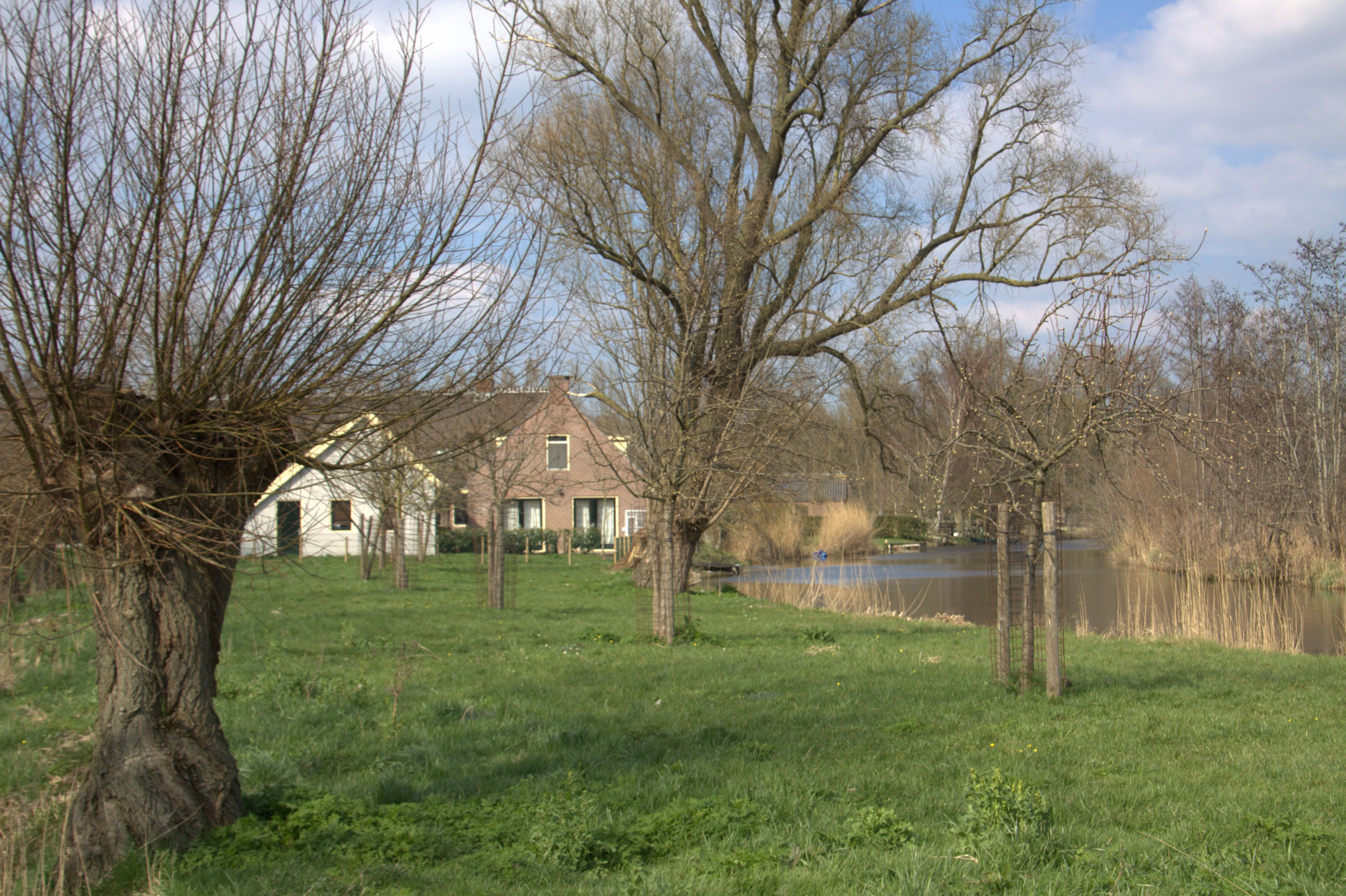
River Aa

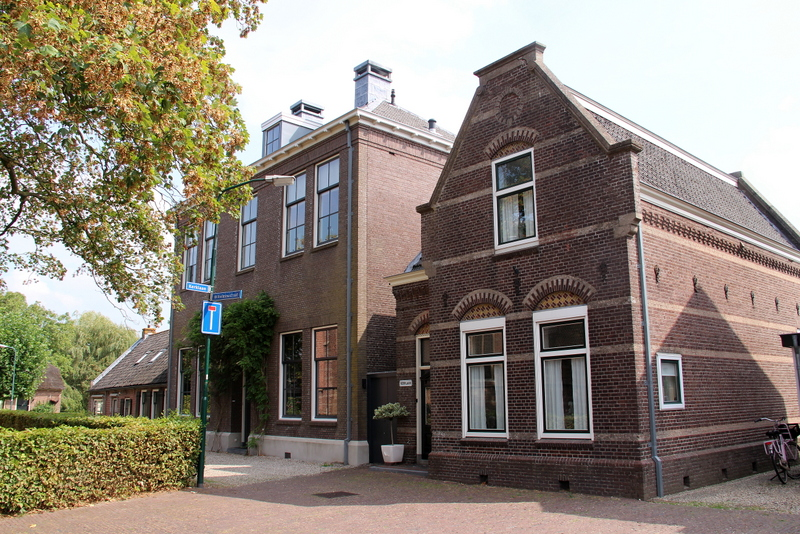
Clergy house
