= Oud-Aa =

- Hamlet
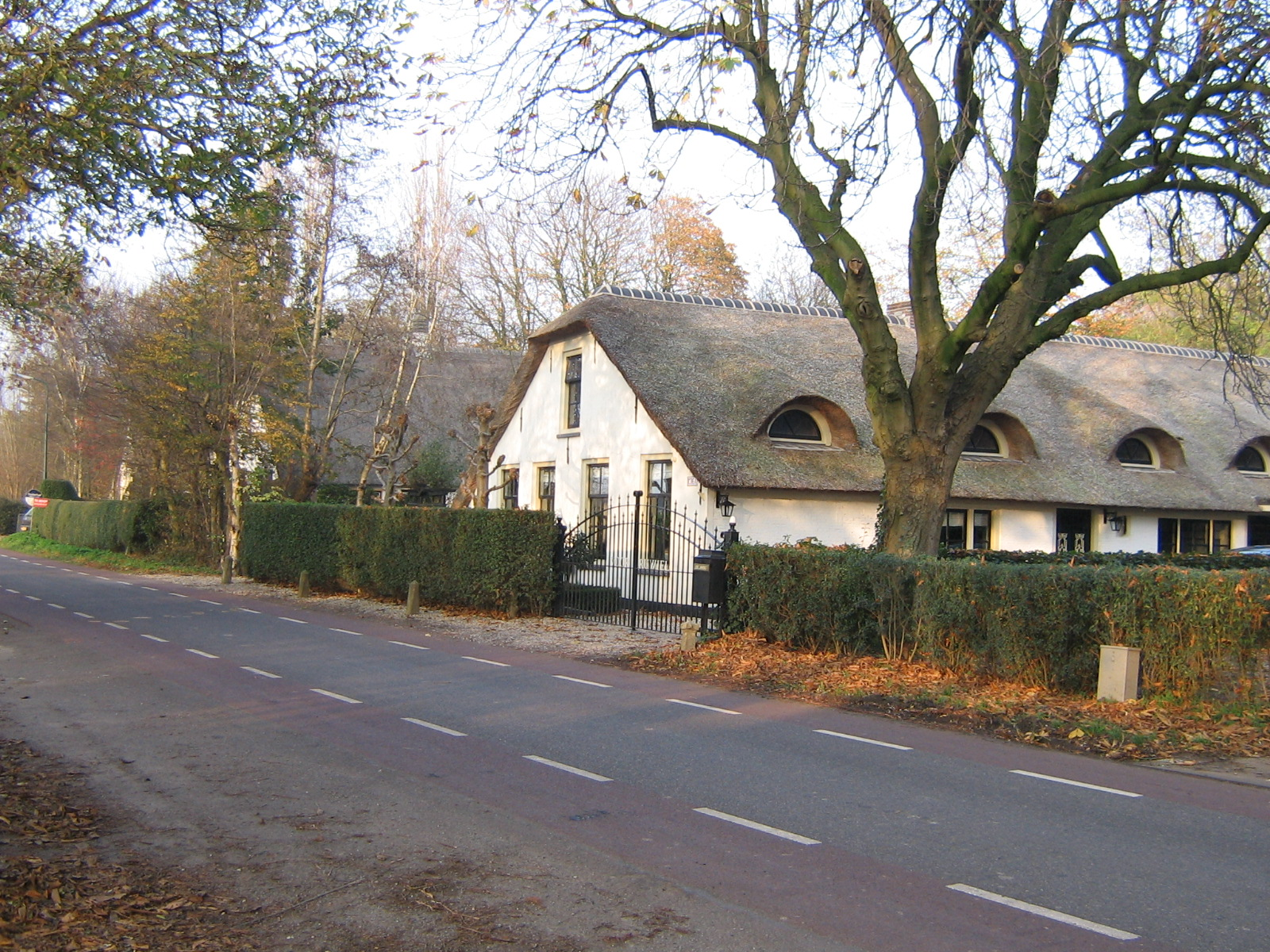
- Farm in Oud-AA

- Location in the Netherlands Oud-Aa (Netherlands)
- Coordinates: 52°10′48″N 4°58′19″E
- Country: Netherlands
- Province: Utrecht
- Municipality: Stichtse Vecht

Area
  - Total: 3.24 km^{2} (1.25 sq mi)

Population (2021)
  - Total: 135
  - Density: 41.7/km^{2} (108/sq mi)
- Time zone: UTC+1 (CET)
  - Summer (DST): UTC+2 (CEST)
- Postal code: 3621
- Dialing code: 0346

Oud-Aa is a hamlet in the Dutch province of Utrecht (province). It is a part of the municipality of Stichtse Vecht, and lies about 13 km northeast of Woerden.

The hamlet was first mentioned in 1138 as "juxta lacum qui vocatur A" (translation: Next to the lake called A), and refers to the Aa River which is a tributary of the Angstel River. Oud (old) has been added to distinguish from Nieuwer-Ter-Aa. The postal authorities have placed it under Breukelen, and there are no place name signs. The castle Ruwiel was located in Oud-Aa, however it was destroyed in 1673 by the French, and now contains a farm. In 1840, it was home to 315 people. There also was a local former municipality called Ruwiel.

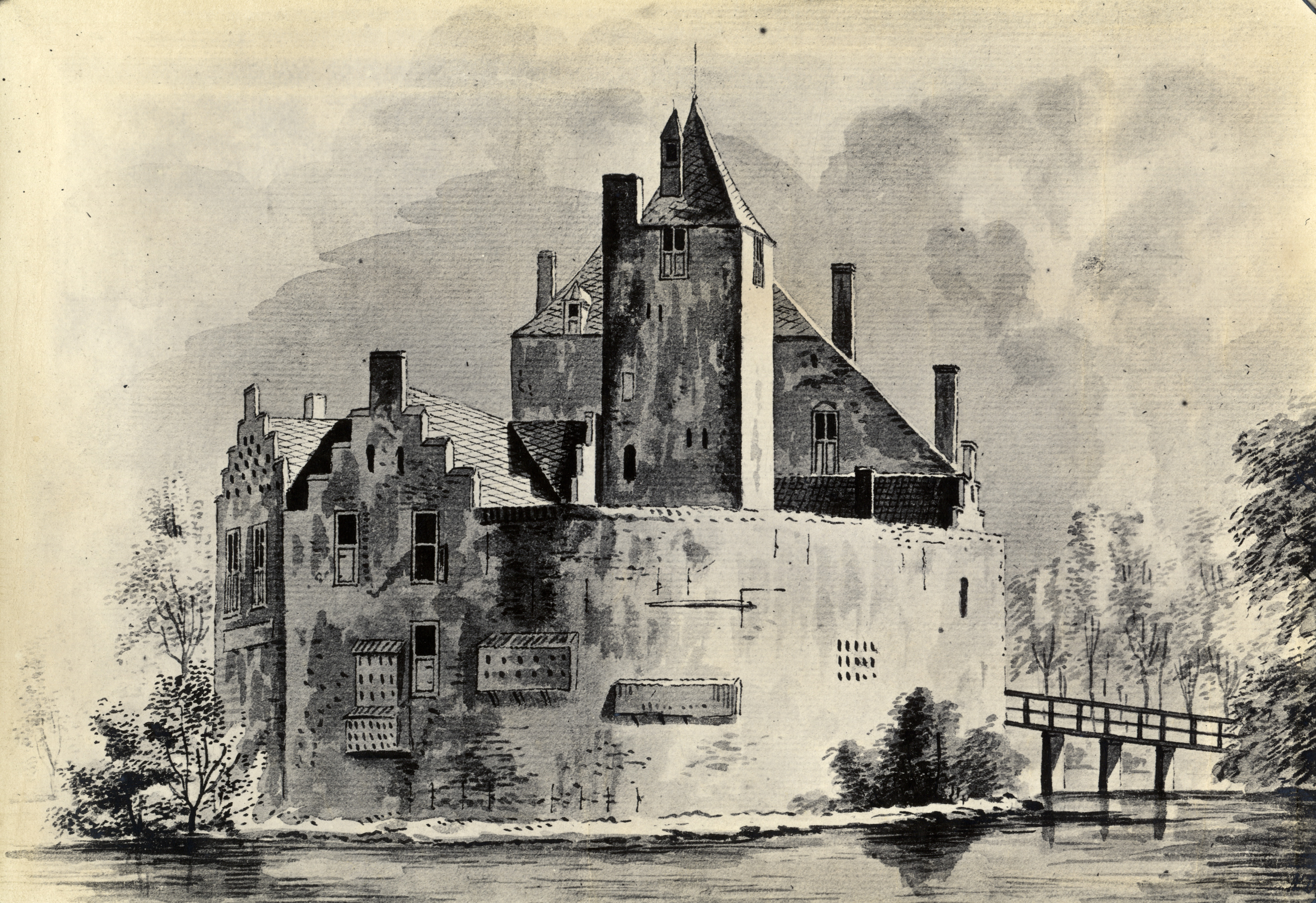
Former Ruwiel Castle seen from the east, 1646-1647

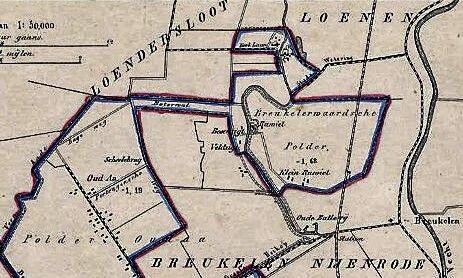
1865 map of Oud Aa with castle remains

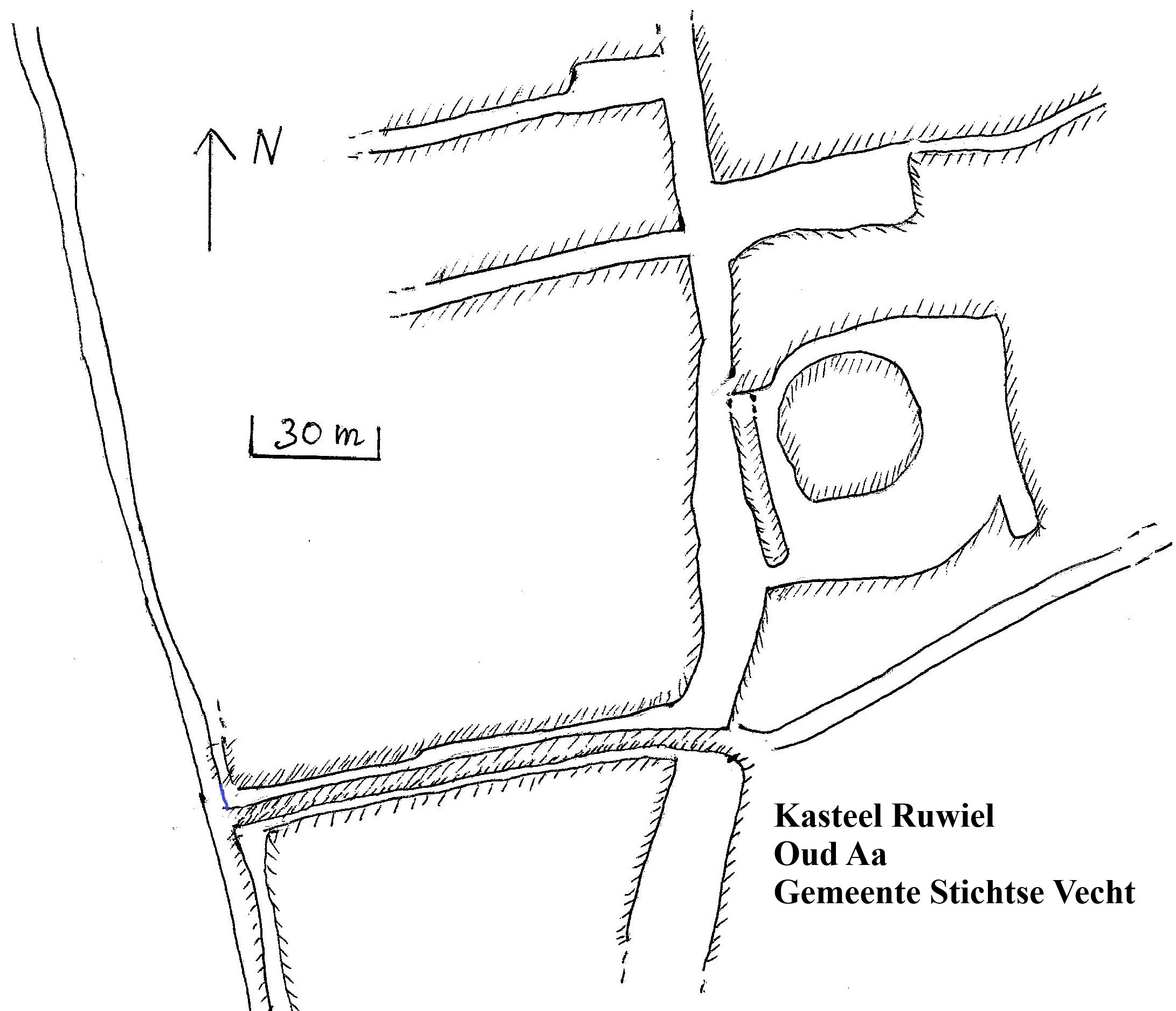
Sketch map of the former Ruwiel Castle islet, 2022

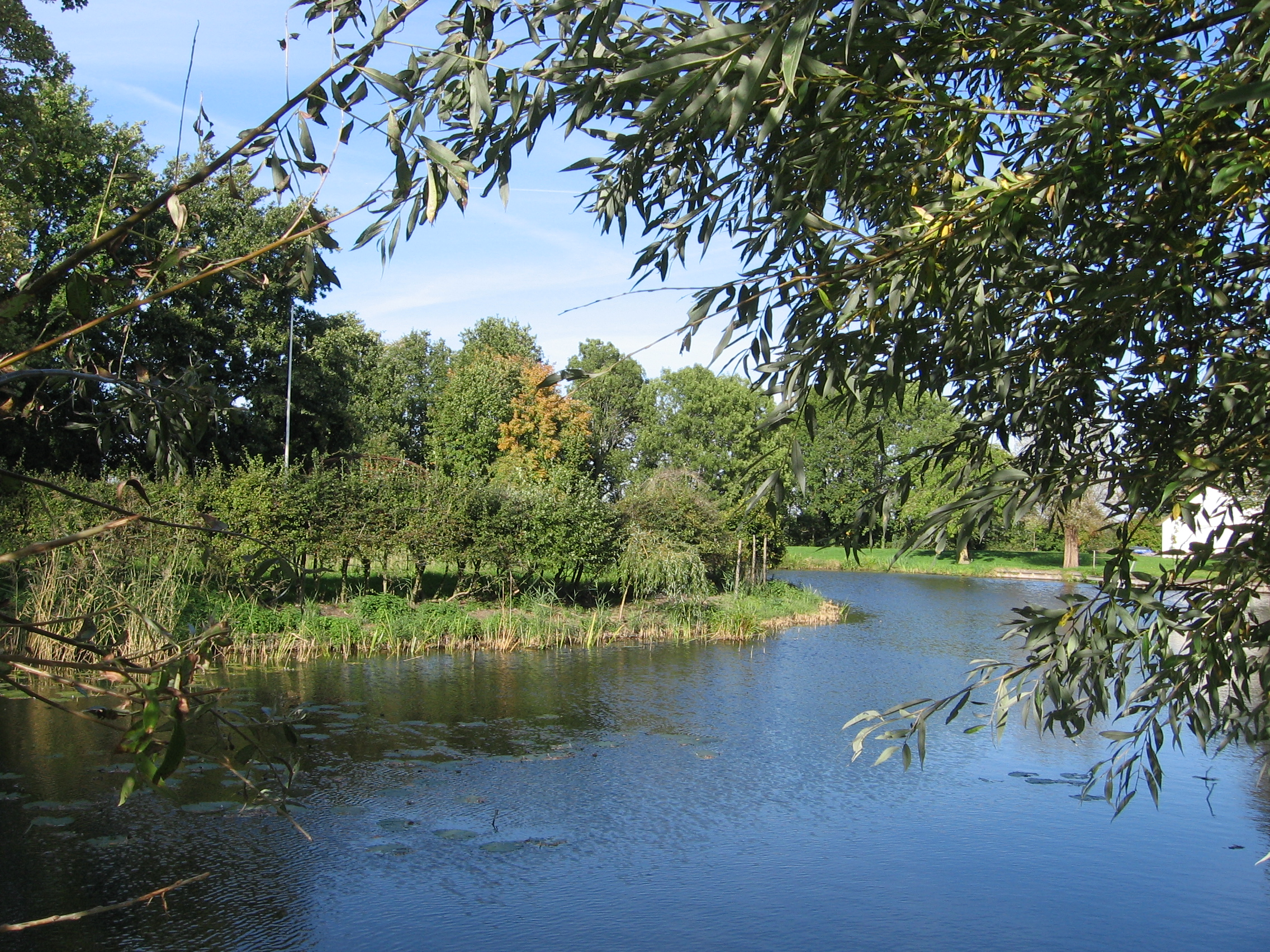
Former Ruwiel Castle islet seen from the southwest, 2022

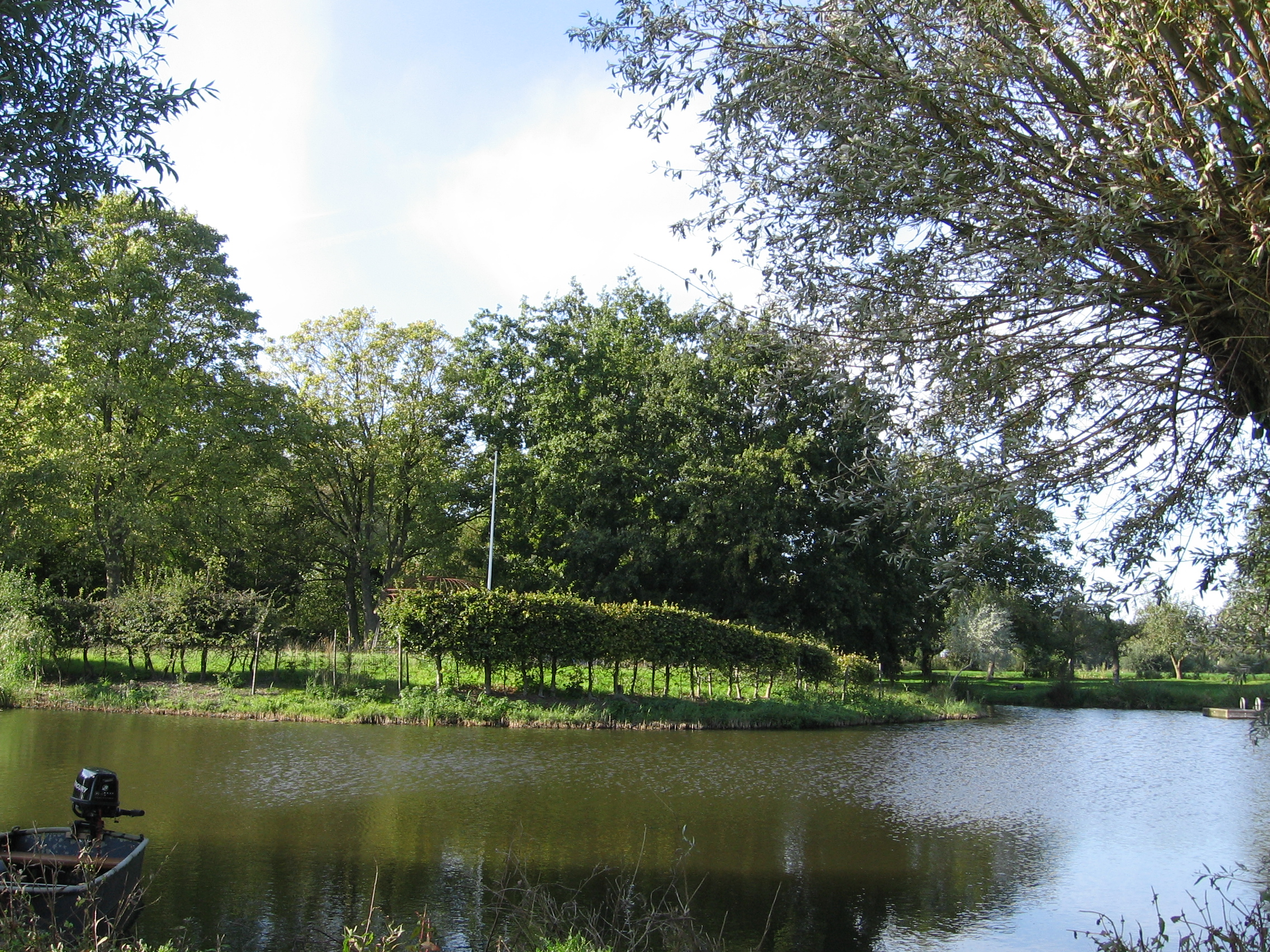
Former Ruwiel Castle islet seen from the southeast, 2022
