= MY Titanic =

Luxury motor yacht

History
- Name: Toko Maru (1971-1996); Kelso (1996-2009); Titanic (since 2009)
- Namesake: RMS Titanic
- Owner: Ministry of Agriculture & Forestry - Fisheries Agency, Japanese Government (1971-1996); Kyoei Kaiun KK, Yokohama (1996); Eurex Ltd/Premier Fishing SA (Pty) Ltd, Cape Town (1996-2005); Ovenstone Agencies Pty Ltd, Cape Town (2005-2009); White Star Line Ltd, Basseterre (since 2009)
- Port of registry: (Japan) Tokyo (1971-1996); Panama (1996-1998); Belize (1998-2009); (Saint Kitts and Nevis) Basseterre (since 2009)
- Builder: Hayashikane Shipbuilding & Engineering Co Ltd, Nagasaki
- Yard number: 800
- Way number: 678
- Launched: 30 Nov 1970
- Completed: 28 Feb 1971
- Identification: IMO number: 7338561; Call sign" V4LE

General characteristics
- Tonnage: 1,678 GT
- Displacement: 1,900 tonnes
- Length: 78.64 m (258 ft 0 in)
- Beam: 11.00 m (36 ft 1 in)
- Depth: 8.01 m (26 ft 3 in)
- Installed power: 4 Niigata 6MQG31EZ diesel engines with 4 HS Turbochargers 4800 turbo chargers. 8,000hp
- Propulsion: single screw
- Speed: 14 knots

The motor yacht Titanic is a 1,900-tonne yacht that was formerly the Japanese Government's research/fishing vessel Toko Maru (東光丸; lit. 'ship of the eastern light') and later Kelso. In March 2010, she developed a leak while sailing in the Caribbean. Her rescue by the United States Coast Guard was co-ordinated from the United Kingdom.

== Description ==
Originally built in 1971, Titanic is a former research/fishing boat. She is 78.64 metres (258 ft 0 in) long, with a beam of 11.00 metres (36 ft 1 in) and a depth of 8.01 metres (26 ft 3 in). She is powered by four Niigata 6MQG31EZ diesel engines. As of April 2010, the vessel was being reconfigured to accept 4 HS Turbochargers 4800 series turbochargers. She displaces 1,900 tonnes. Her IMO Number is 7338561.

== History ==
The ship was built in 1971 by Hayashikane Shipbuilding & Engineering Co Ltd, Nagasaki as Toko Maru. Commissioned by the Japanese government as a fisheries inspection vessel, it supported the Japanese fishing fleet operating in international waters. After 25 years of service, deterioration of the hull, engines and other facilities led to the ship being decommissioned. It was replaced with a new, larger Toko Maru, capable of supporting Japanese fishing at greater distances and rougher seas in the Indian and Atlantic Oceans.

In 1996, she was sold to Premier Fishing, South Africa and renamed Kelso. In 2009, she was sold to Bill Schlagel of California who intended to convert her into a luxury motor yacht, and renamed her Titanic. On 16 August 2009, Titanic visited St Helena where it was discovered that she was not displaying her name. The vessel's name was not on shipping registers either. It was established that the vessel was bona fide. She departed the next day.

On 31 March 2010, Titanic developed a leak while on a voyage from Grenada to Puerto Rico where she was to undergo a refit. Crew member Mark Corbett used the yacht's satellite phone to call his friend Alex Evans's mobile phone. Evans received the call while in a DIY shop in Aberystwyth, Wales. He took down details including the position of the ship, which was 108 nautical miles (200 km) southeast of St Croix, (at 16°17.276′N 63°44.239′W), writing the details on a till receipt. Evans then went to the local RNLI lifeboat station and telephoned the Coastguard at Milford Haven and asked to be put through to the Maritime Rescue Co-ordination Centre (MRCC) at Falmouth from where the rescue was co-ordinated at a distance of over 4,000 miles (6,400 km).

The MRCC contacted the United States Coast Guard at Portsmouth, Virginia who relayed a message to colleagues at San Juan, Puerto Rico. A French aircraft was sent to search for Titanic. A United States Coast Guard helicopter was despatched from CGAS Borinquem, Puerto Rico. The helicopter landed a salvage pump on board the yacht, which was later taken under tow by USCGC Chincoteague. The tow was later taken over by the tug Mitchel. The yacht was taken to Frederiksted, United States Virgin Islands; none of the crew were injured.
