= Loenersloot =

- Village
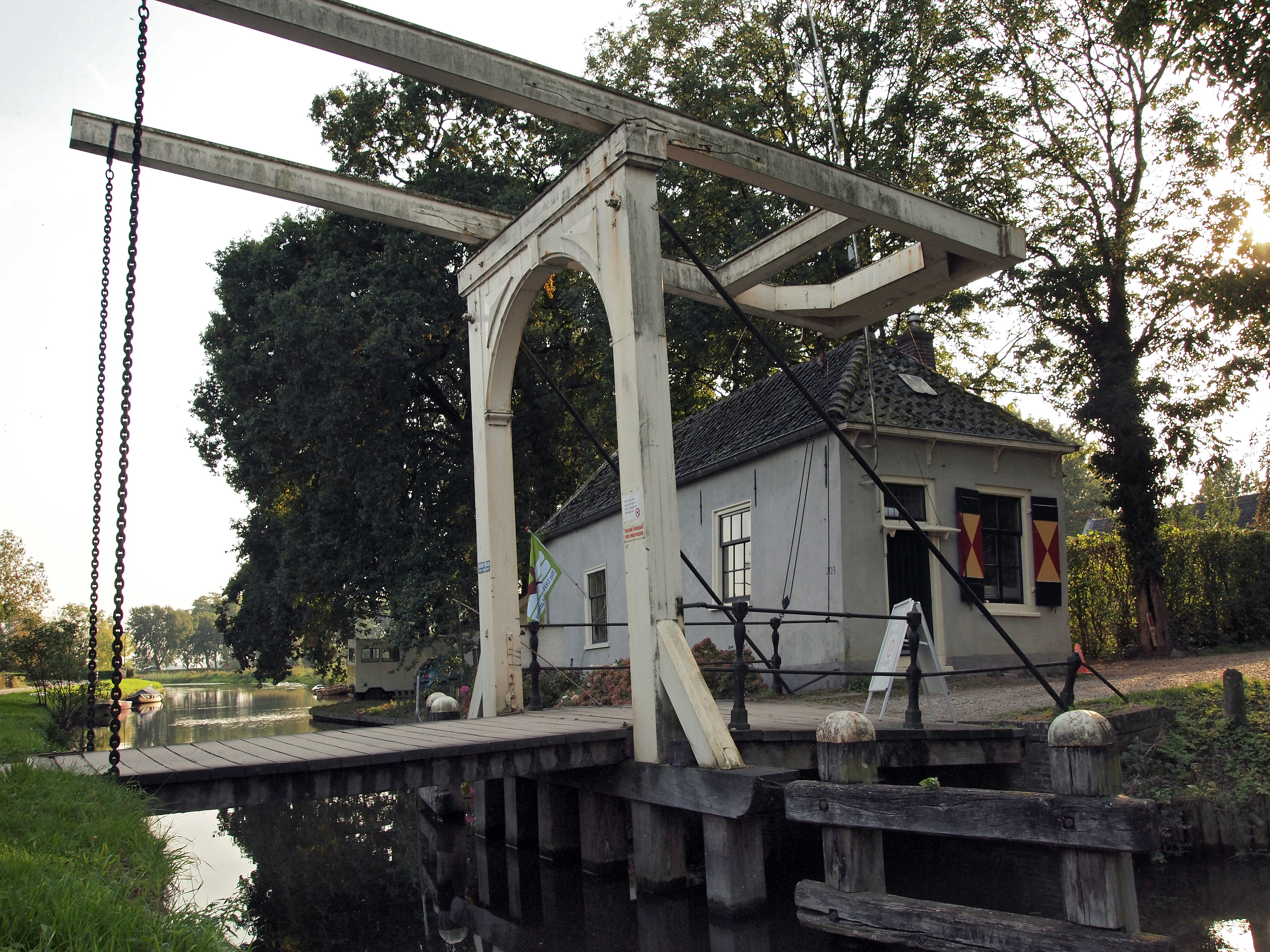
- Bridge across the Angstel near Castle Loenersloot

- Location in the Netherlands Loenersloot (Netherlands)
- Coordinates: 52°13′47″N 5°0′5″E
- Country: Netherlands
- Province: Utrecht
- Municipality: Stichtse Vecht

Area
  - Total: 2.14 km^{2} (0.83 sq mi)
- Elevation: −0.9 m (−3.0 ft)

Population (2021)
  - Total: 485
  - Density: 227/km^{2} (587/sq mi)
- Time zone: UTC+1 (CET)
  - Summer (DST): UTC+2 (CEST)
- Postal code: 3634
- Dialing code: 0294

Loenersloot is a village in the Dutch province of Utrecht. It was a part of the former municipality of Loenen. Since 2011 it has made part of the new formed municipality of Stichtse Vecht. It lies about 12 km west of Hilversum. It is located on the Angstel River.

Loenersloot used to be a separate municipality. In 1964, it merged with the neighbouring municipality of Loenen. Castle Loenersloot is located in the village.

== History ==
The village is first mentioned between 918 and 948 as in Lonora laca. By 1156, it became Heinricum de Lonreslothe, and means "ditch near Loenen.

Loenersloot developed along the Angstel River opposite Castle Loenersloot. The castle was built in 1258 by the van Loenersloot family as a loan of Otto II, Count of Guelders. In 1377, it was besieged. In 1766 it was sold to Hendrik Willem van Hoorn and partially demolished, however van Hoorn was declared bankrupt in 1770, and the new owner restored the castle and turned it into an estate.

Loenersloot already had a chapel in the 14th century. In the 16th century, a courthouse and inn was next to the chapel. In 1840, Loenersloot was home to 303 people.

== Gallery ==
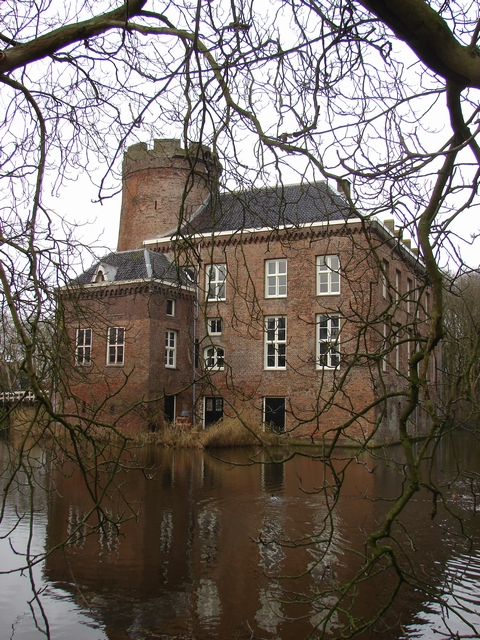
Castle Loenersloot

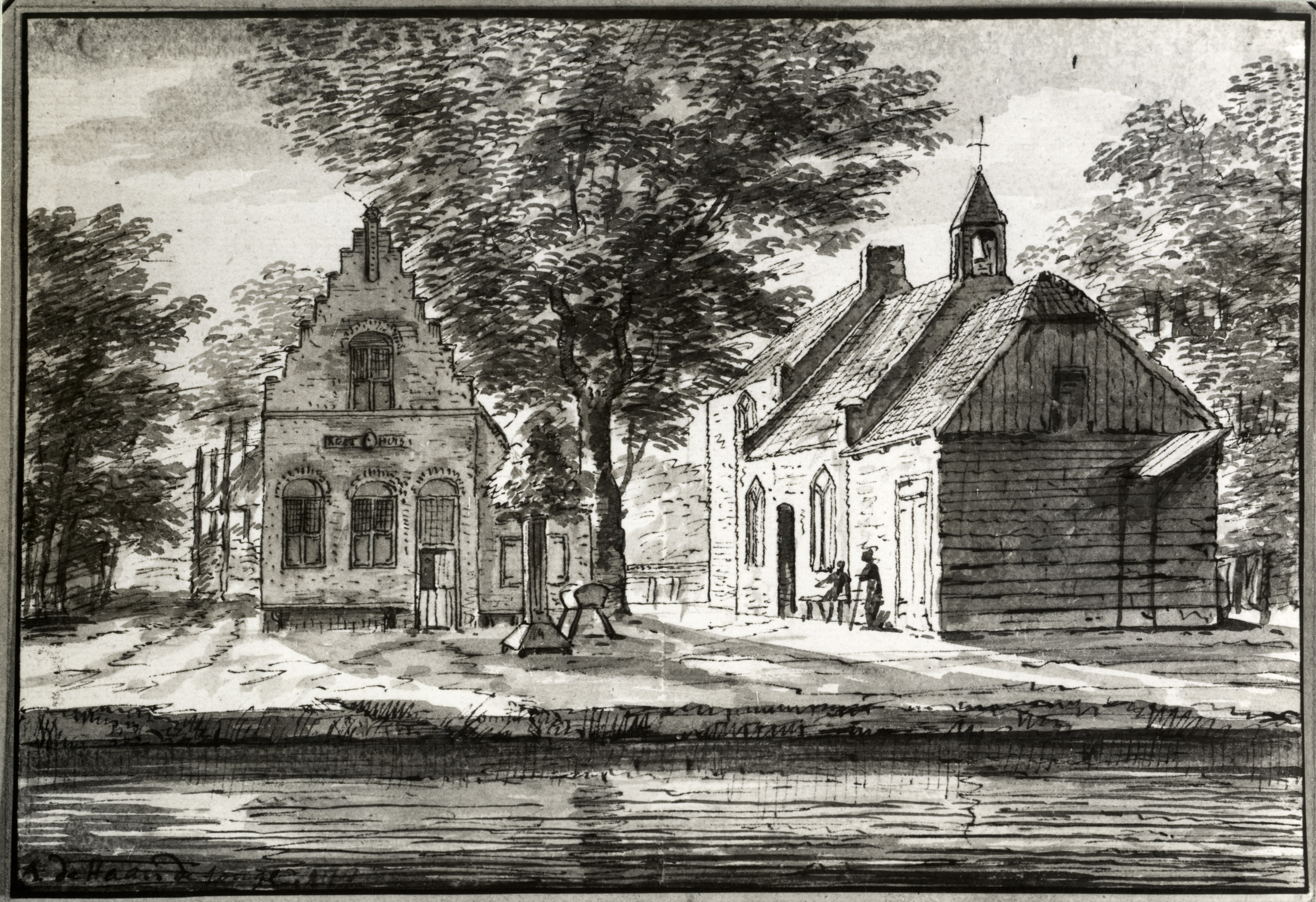
Drawing of chapel and court house (1724)

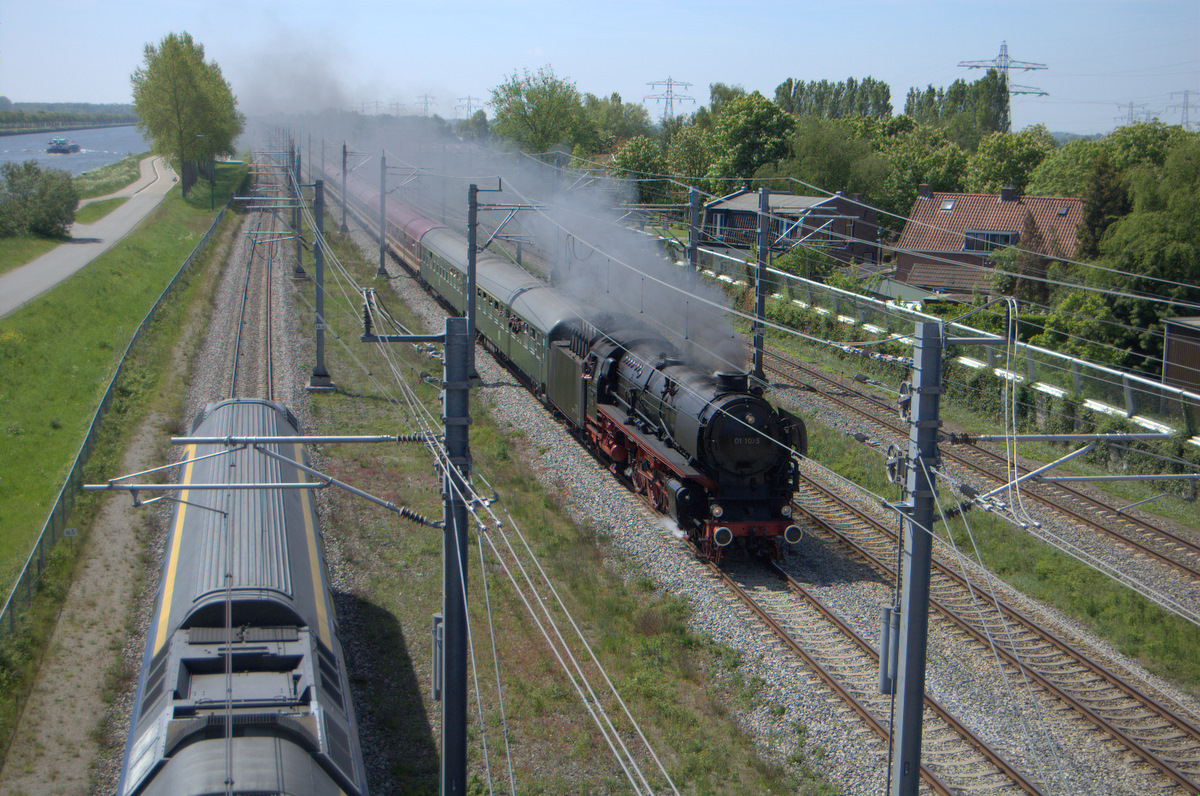
Steam train overtaking an electric train

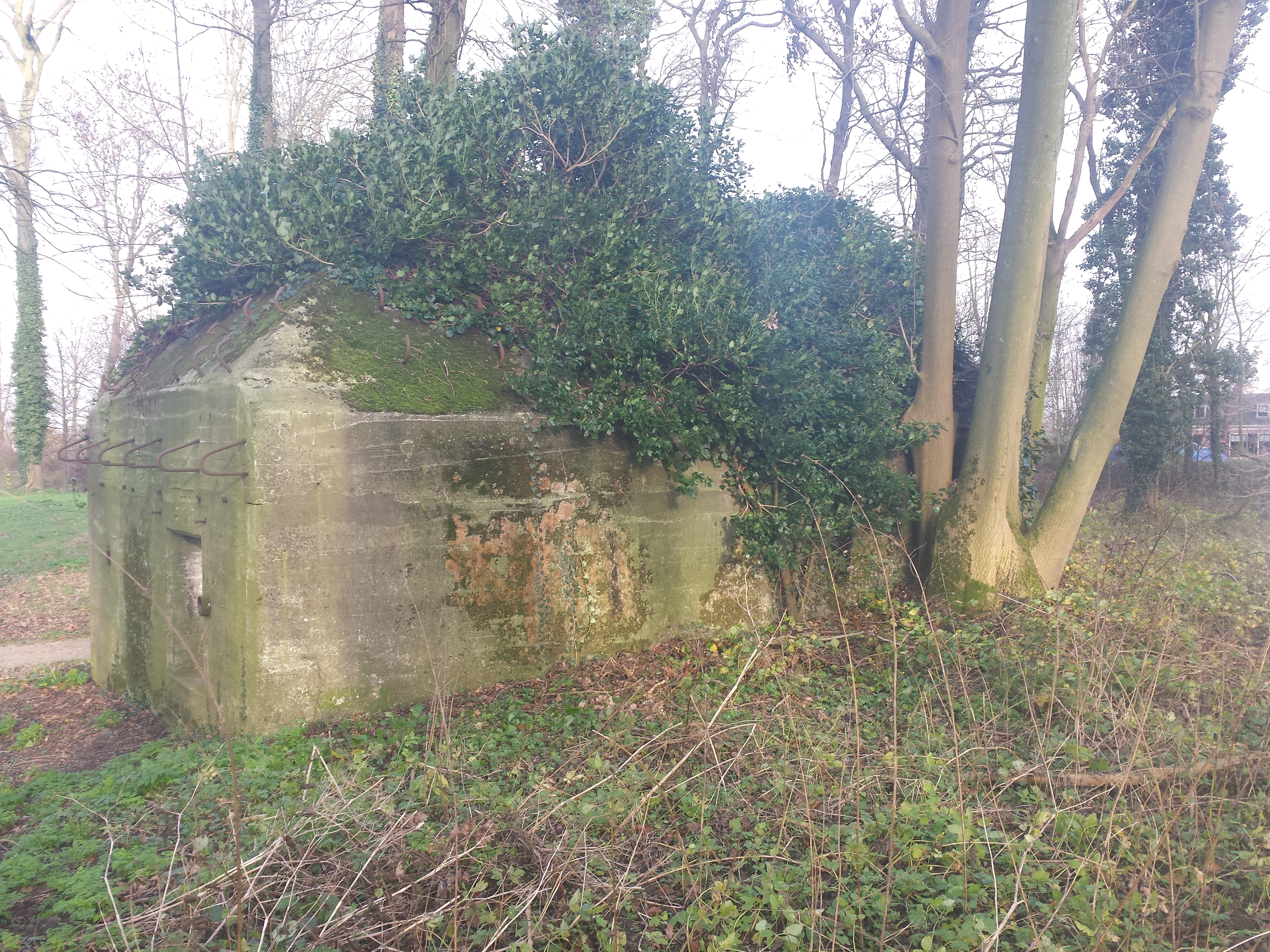
Overgrown World War II bunker
