= RawFaith =

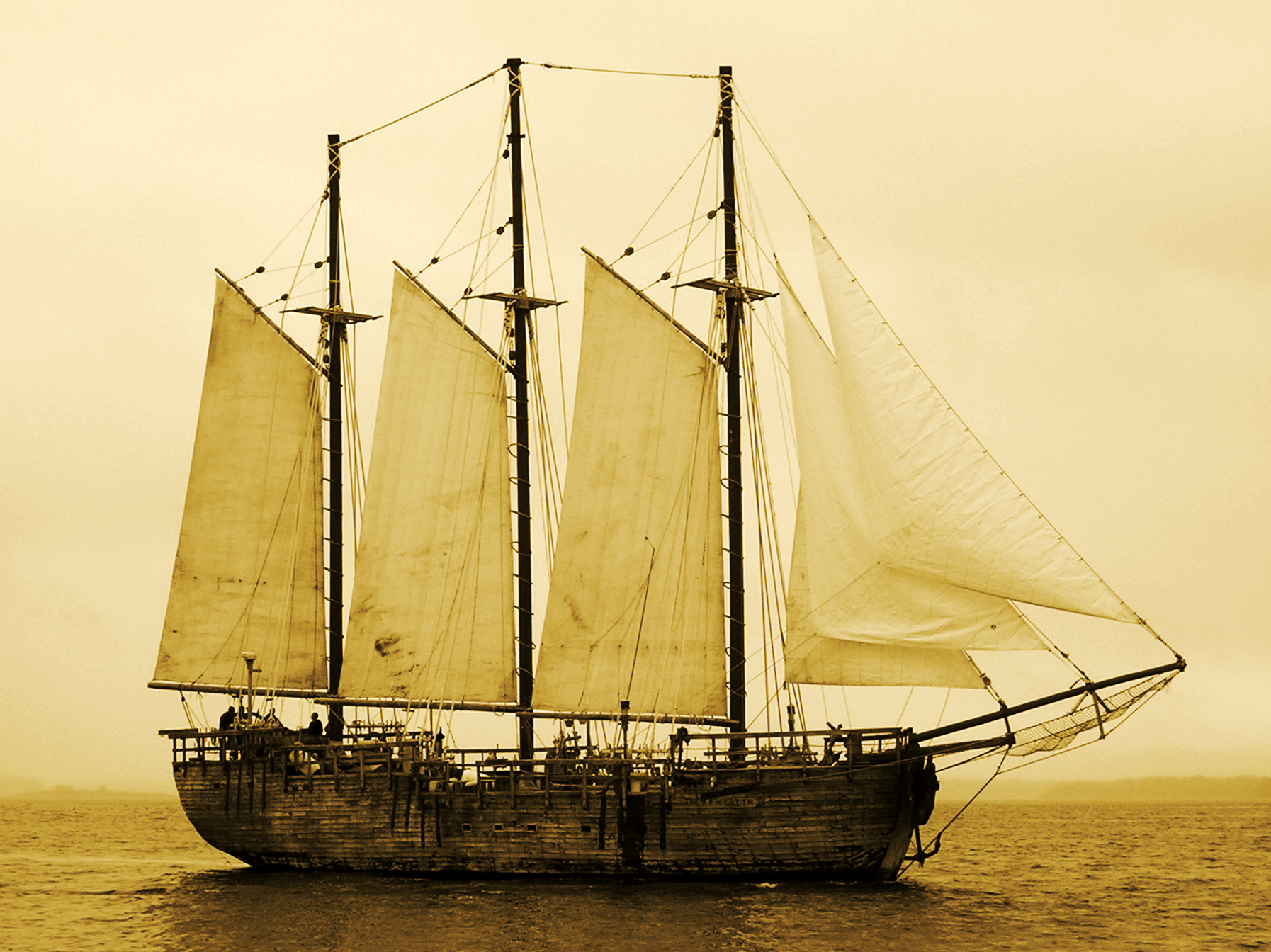
- RawFaith

History

United States
- Name: RawFaith
- Owner: George McKay
- Operator: George Mckay
- Builder: George McKay
- Laid down: 1999
- Launched: 2003
- Fate: Sunk on December 8, 2010

General characteristics
- Type: three-masted schooner rig on unique homemade hull
- Displacement: 300 T
- Length: 80 ft (24 m) at waterline, 88 ft (27 m) on deck, 118 feet (36 m) sparred length
- Beam: 26 ft (7.9 m)
- Height: 80 ft (24 m)
- Draft: 7 ft (2.1 m)
- Notes: 3,000 square feet (280 m^{2}) sail area. White oak wood hull, Douglas fir masts

RawFaith was a wooden sailing vessel built and owned by George McKay in Maine, United States.

== Construction ==
RawFaith was built in Addison, Maine, by George McKay and his three sons. Construction took 28 months, spread over four years. The construction was performed using a variety of makeshift methods. This was exemplified in the use of a half hull model ship, steam box, the builder's interpretation of 16th-century lines, and other old shipbuilding techniques, but using power tools and laminates to aid in construction and simulate strength. She was constructed of a wide variety of woods and materials, most not normally considered appropriate for marine construction. Rawfaith was not built using shipwrights or naval architects. She was controversial in all aspects and was regarded by most professionals as being very poorly built and designed.

== Design ==
RawFaith was designed with 16th-century race-built galleons such as the Revenge in mind. Raw faith was intended to be wheel chair accessible. The ship was designed by the owner with no previous knowledge of naval architecture. Accordingly, the vessel did not actually resemble any galleon or traditional vessel, and was rigged as a schooner. However, the mast and sail configuration was also atypical.

== Purpose ==
RawFaith was wheelchair accessible, and the intent was to provide free sailing adventures to groups which would normally be deterred from sailing by a member in a wheelchair. Many accessibility features had not yet been installed, though the captain's daughter, a wheelchair user, lived aboard for many months.

== Controversy ==
RawFaith had been the target of criticism for her lack of seaworthiness. On Thanksgiving Day 2004, she was rescued by the United States Coast Guard about 80 miles (130 km) off the Maine coast after the rudder mechanism failed and the top of the foremast snapped off. She was towed to Rockland, Maine, to undergo repairs.

In another incident on May 9, 2006, all three masts snapped during another storm off the coast of Maine. One of the crew was struck in the head by a piece of the falling mast, but not seriously injured. RawFaith was rescued by the Coast Guard cutter Seneca about 50 miles (80 km) off Mt. Desert Rock and was again towed to Rockland for repairs.

== Sinking ==
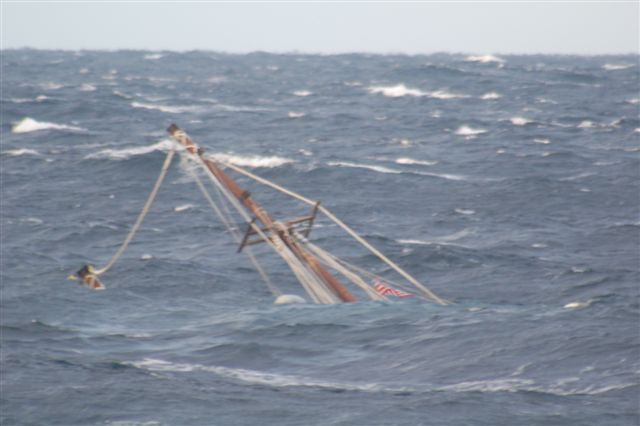
Two of RawFaith's masts protrude from the water as the ship sinks into the Atlantic Ocean on December 8, 2010.

On December 8, 2010, RawFaith began taking on water in rough seas off the coast of Nantucket and sank in 6,000 feet (1,800 m) of water. Two people had been rescued from the ship by a helicopter from Coast Guard Air Station Cape Cod the previous day.
