= USCGC Chincoteague (WPB-1320) =

United States Coast Guard ship

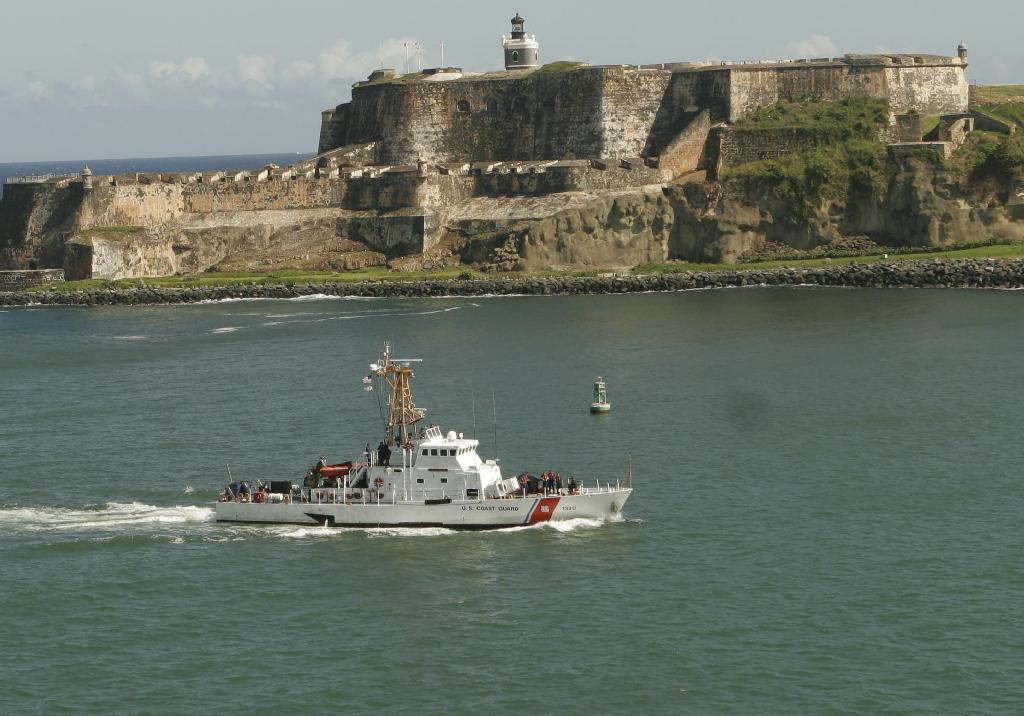
- USCGC Chincoteague (WPB-1320)

History

United States
- Namesake: Chincoteague Island, Virginia
- Builder: Bolinger Shipyard; Lockport, Louisiana
- Commissioned: 8 August 1988
- Home port: San Juan, PR
- Identification: NAOI
- Motto: "Ride the White Horse"
- Status: in active service

General characteristics
- Class & type: Island class patrol cutter (WPB)
- Displacement: 153 tons
- Length: 110 ft (34 m)
- Beam: 21 ft (6.4 m)
- Draft: 6.5 ft (2.0 m)
- Propulsion: Two Alco-Paxman Valenta 16 RP200-1 geared diesel engines, 5,280 hp (3,940 kW), two screws.
- Speed: 29 knots
- Range: 1,900 miles
- Endurance: 6 days
- Boats & landing craft carried: 1 - Cutter Boat Medium (90 HP outboard engine)
- Complement: 16 personnel (2 officers, 14 enlisted)
- Sensors & processing systems: AN/SPS-64V radar
- Armament: 1 × Mk 38 25 mm chain gun; 2 × M2 .50-cal MG; BOWS
- Aircraft carried: None

USCGC Chincoteague (WPB-1320) is an Island-class cutter of the United States Coast Guard. The third Coast Guard vessel to bear the name, Chincoteague was constructed at Bollinger Machine Shop and Shipyard in Lockport, Louisiana. She was commissioned on 8 August 1988.

Assigned to operate from Mobile, Alabama, later she was reassigned to Key West, Florida to serve with Coast Guard Group Key West, while her current home port is San Juan, Puerto Rico. Chincoteague has served in the search and rescue, maritime law enforcement, the war on drugs, and Alien Migrant Interdiction Operations, rescuing thousands of migrants from throughout the Caribbean, and seizing thousands of pounds of illegal drugs.

Towards the end of 2009, Chincoteague was drydocked for maintenance and repairs in Tampa, Florida by Riverhawk Marine.

== Armament ==
Chincoteague is normally armed with a single Mk 38 Bushmaster 25mm chain gun forwards, and a pair of M2 .50-caliber machine guns. However, the ship has been modified to allow for quick installation of the Bolt On Weapons System (BOWS) in place of its towing equipment, which would add a second Mk 38 cannon with ammo storage, and a launcher for FIM-92 Stinger MANPADS anti-aircraft missiles.

== MY Titanic rescue ==
On 31 March 2010, the motor yacht Titanic, carrying three people, developed a leak while on a voyage from Grenada to Puerto Rico, 108 nautical miles (200 km) south east of St Croix. Upon receiving Titanic's distress call, Chincoteague was dispatched to tow the stricken vessel, assisted by the tug Mitchel, to Frederiksted, United States Virgin Islands.
