= Angstel River =

River in the Netherlands

Coordinates: 52.2369°N 5.0006°E

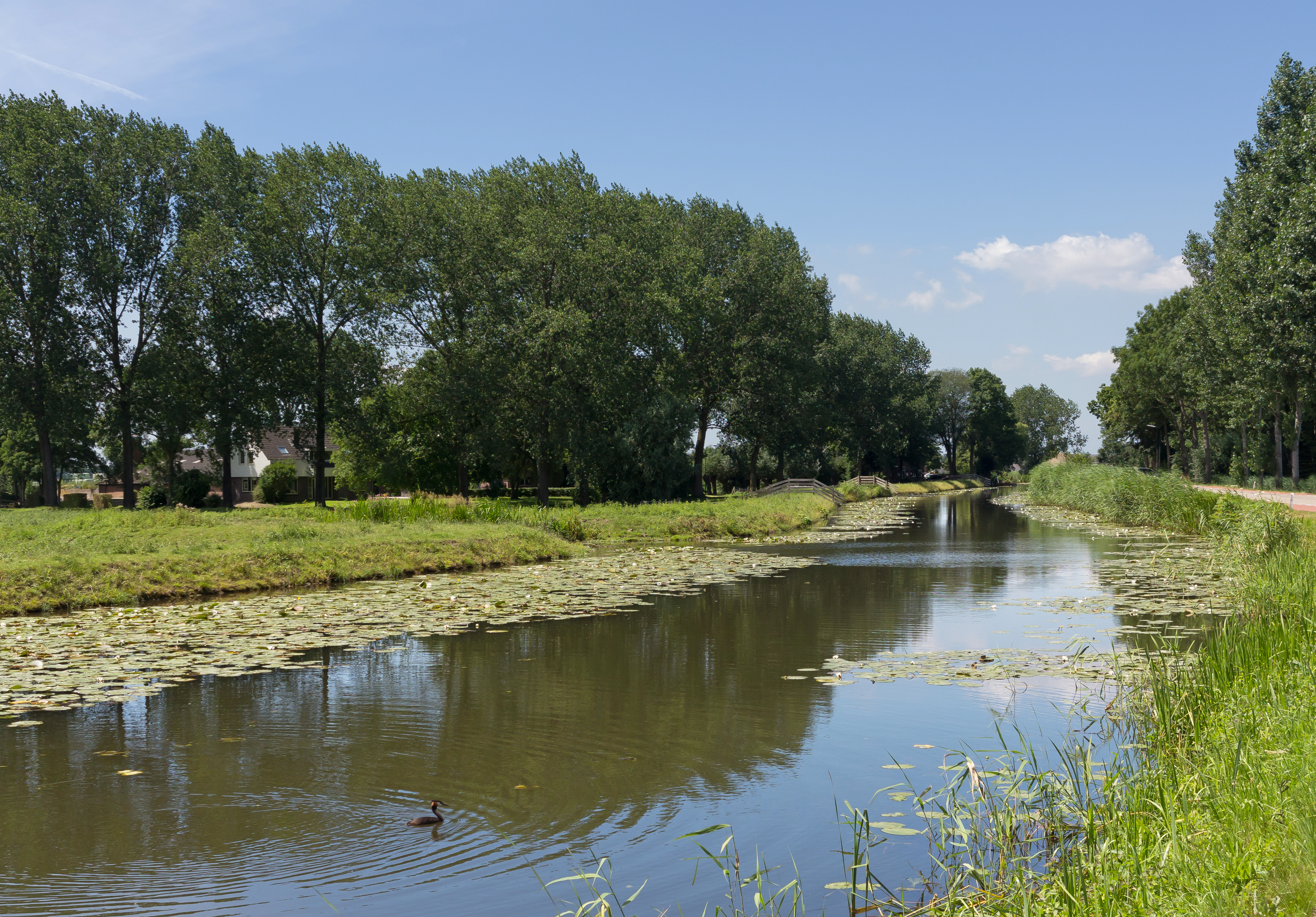
The Angstel between Baambrugge and Loenersloot

The Angstel is a small river between Abcoude and Loenersloot in the Netherlands, about halfway between Amsterdam and Utrecht. The Angstel is about 6 km (3.75 mi) long and connects the Gein and Holendrecht rivers with the Aa and Winkel rivers. East of the Angstel is the Amsterdam–Rhine Canal.

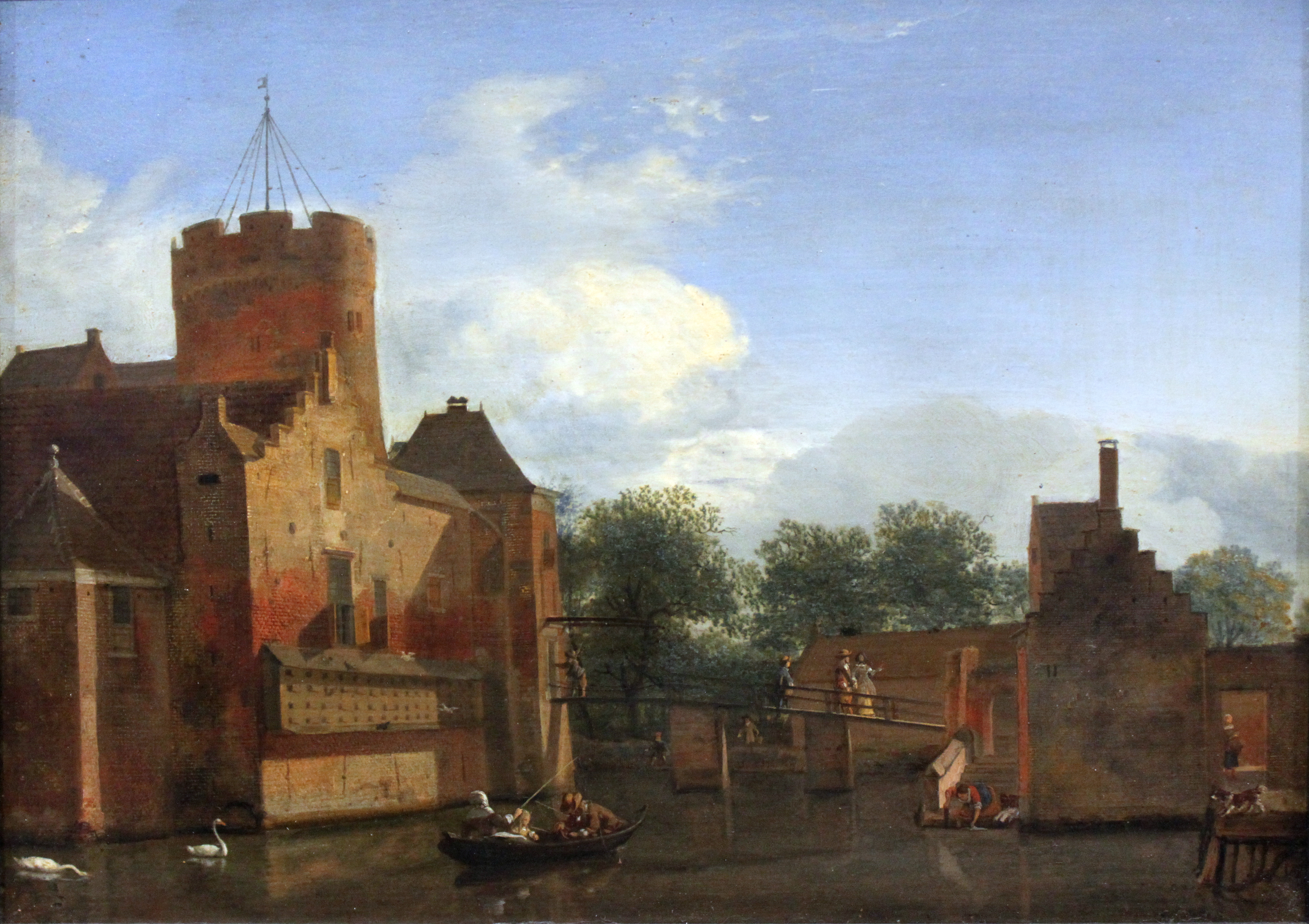
Castle Loenersloot on the Angstel, ca. 1668

Originally the Angstel was a distributary of the Utrechtse Vecht, with the Vecht in turn a distributary of the Rhine. The river marks the border of the municipality De Ronde Venen. Along the river are several Country Estates of wealthy residents dating back to the 17th and 18th century. The castle of Loenersloot is located on the left bank of the Angstel and dates its origin back to the mid 13th century. On the right bank near Abcoude lies a modern fort dating back to 1885 built as part of the military defense of Amsterdam.

There are four bridges over the river: the Dorpsbrug Baambrugge in Baambrugge, the Hulksbrug, the Heinkuitenbrug and the Derde in Abcoude.
