= Herveld =

- Village
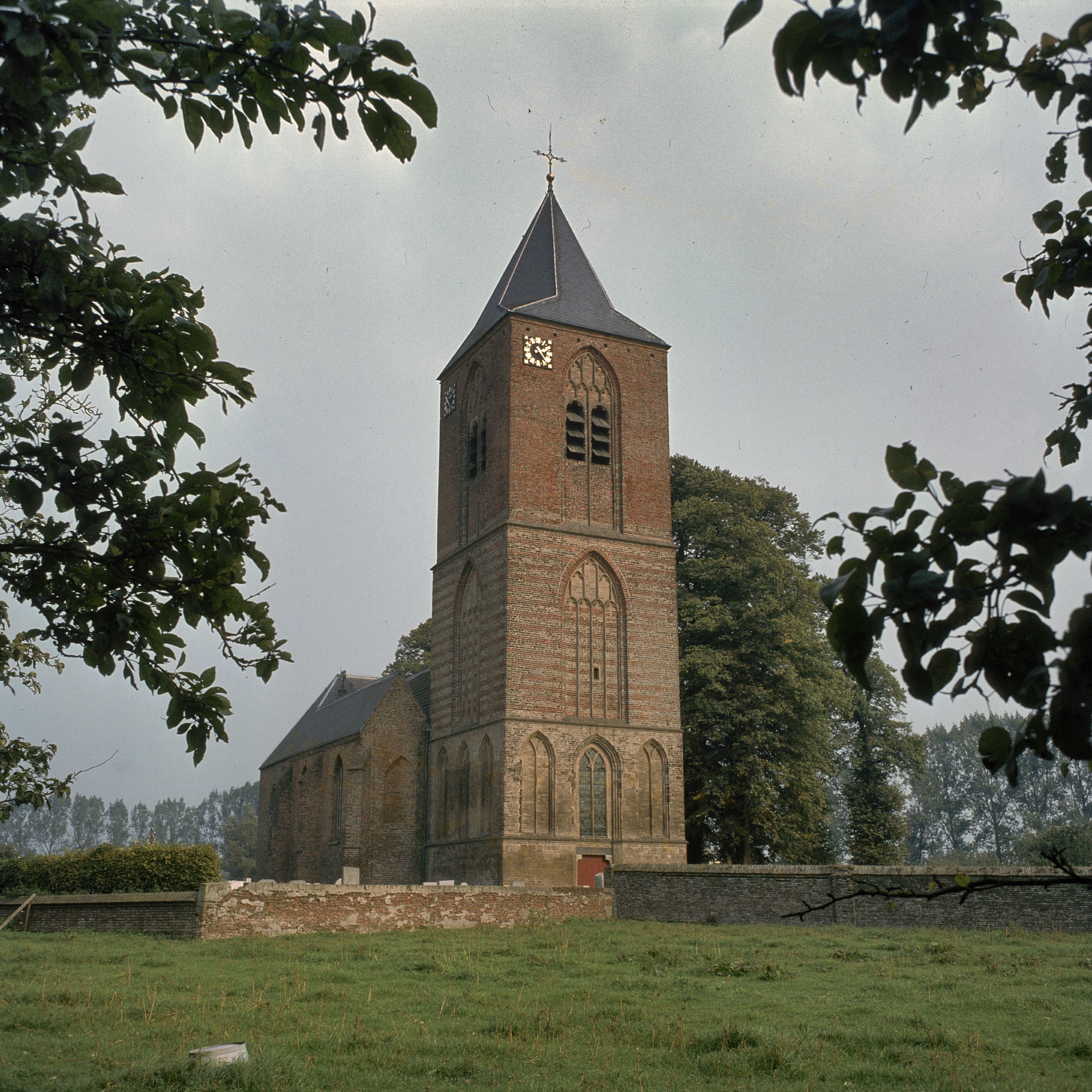
- Church of Herveld

- Location in the Netherlands Herveld (Netherlands)
- Coordinates: 51°54′N 5°45′E
- Country: Netherlands
- Province: Gelderland
- Municipality: Overbetuwe

Area
  - Total: 11.25 km^{2} (4.34 sq mi)
- Elevation: 8 m (26 ft)

Population (2021)
  - Total: 3,075
  - Density: 273.3/km^{2} (707.9/sq mi)
- Time zone: UTC+1 (CET)
  - Summer (DST): UTC+2 (CEST)
- Postal code: 6674
- Dialing code: 0488

Herveld (Dutch pronunciation: [ˈɦɛrvɛlt]) is a village in the Dutch province of Gelderland. It is located in the municipality of Overbetuwe.

Herveld was a separate municipality until 1818, when the area was divided between Loenen en Wolferen and Valburg.

The village exists of two semi-separate communities of Herveld-Noord and Herveld-Zuid., connected by the Stenenkamerstraat. The mostly Catholic Herveld-North is located directly east of the village Andelst while the more Protestant Herveld-South is a mile further south. Most amenities such as supermarkets, are located in Herveld-North.

In the center of Herveld-South is a Gothic hall church, dating from the 15th century. Just outside the village is De Vink, a mill from the 18th century. Herveld is just off the A50 motorway (junction/knooppunt Valburg), and to come into the village, one must follow the A15.

Herveld has a rich history of fruit cultivation.

== Gallery ==
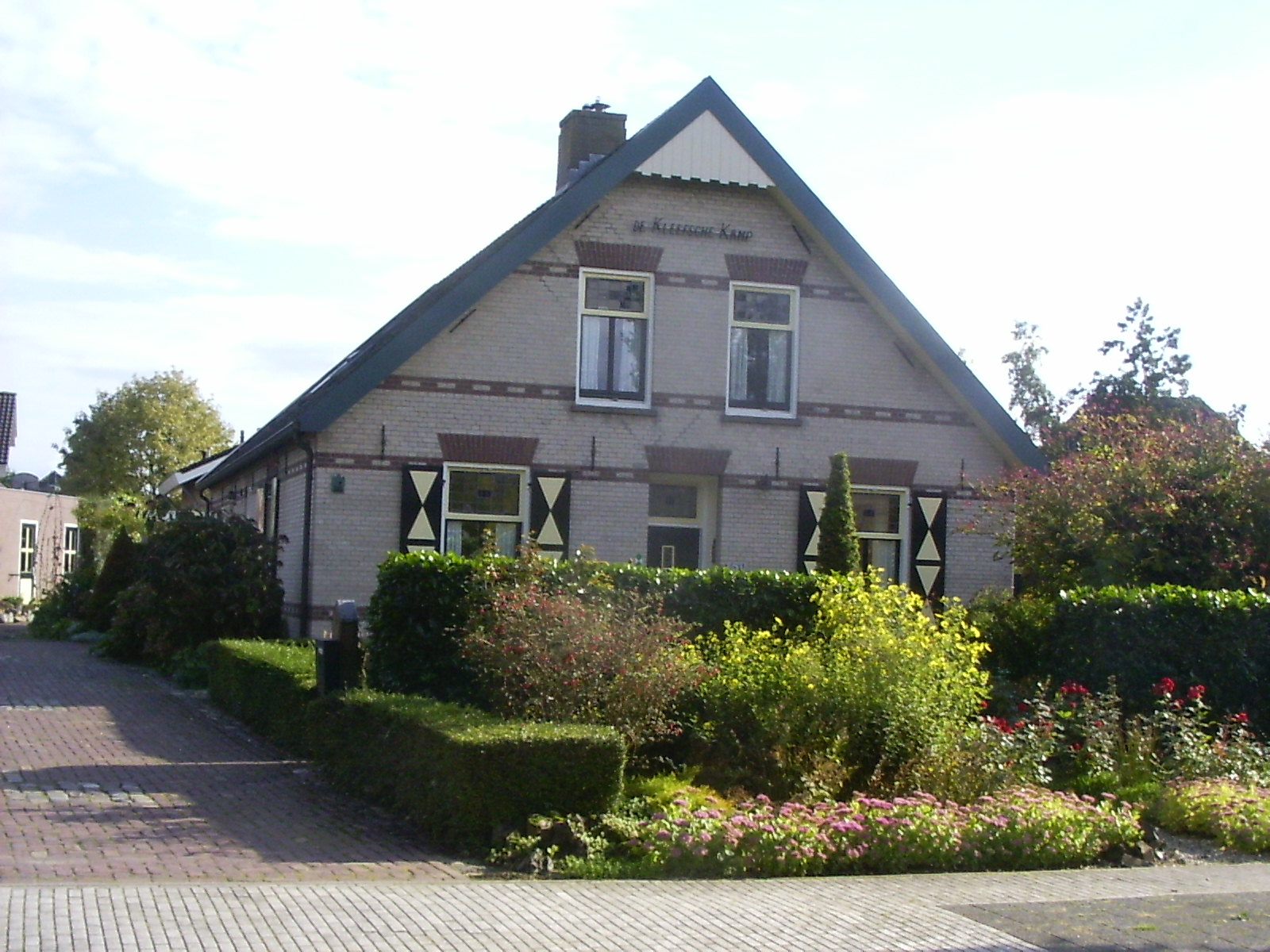
House in Herveld

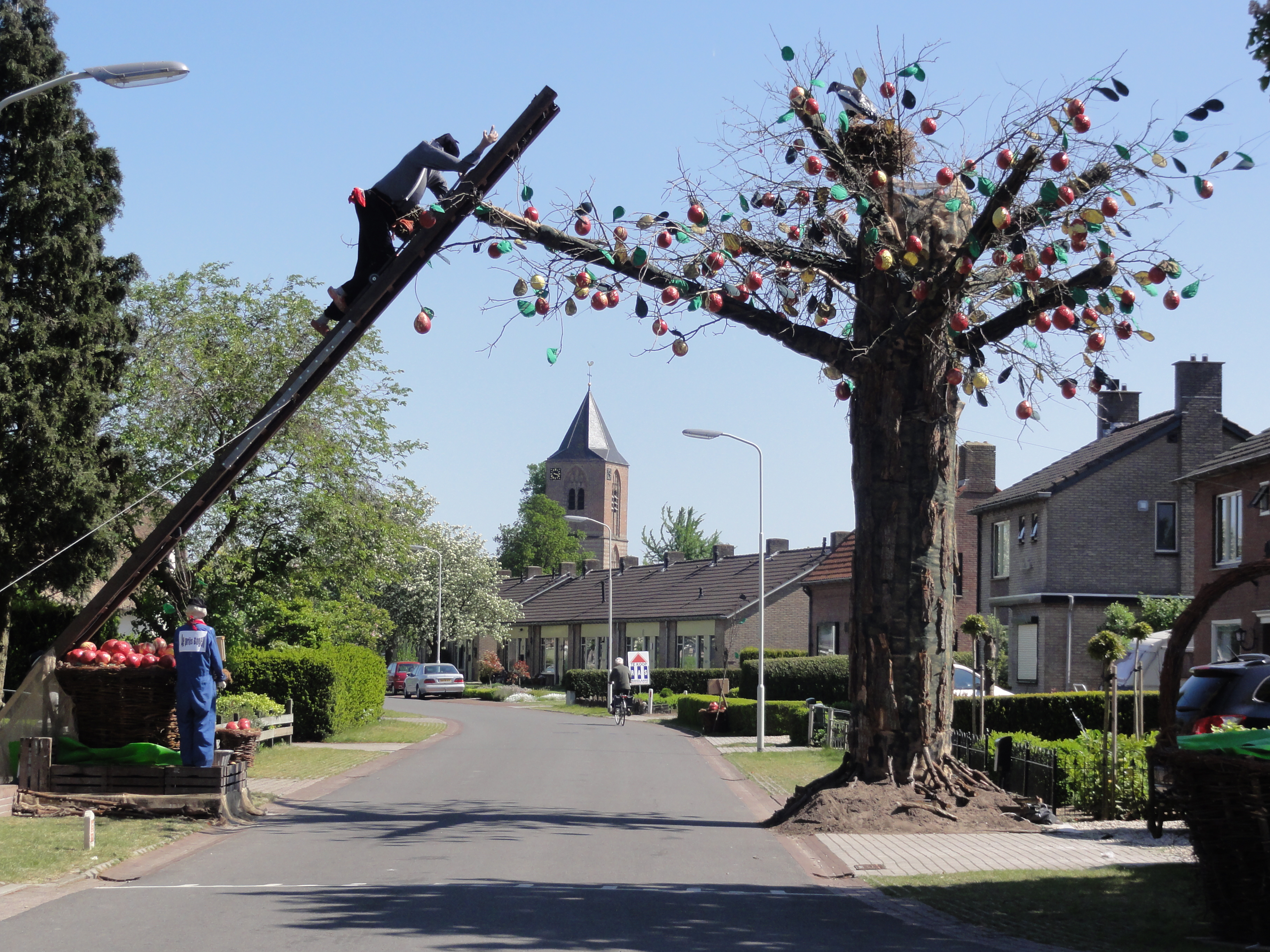
Gate for Queen's Day

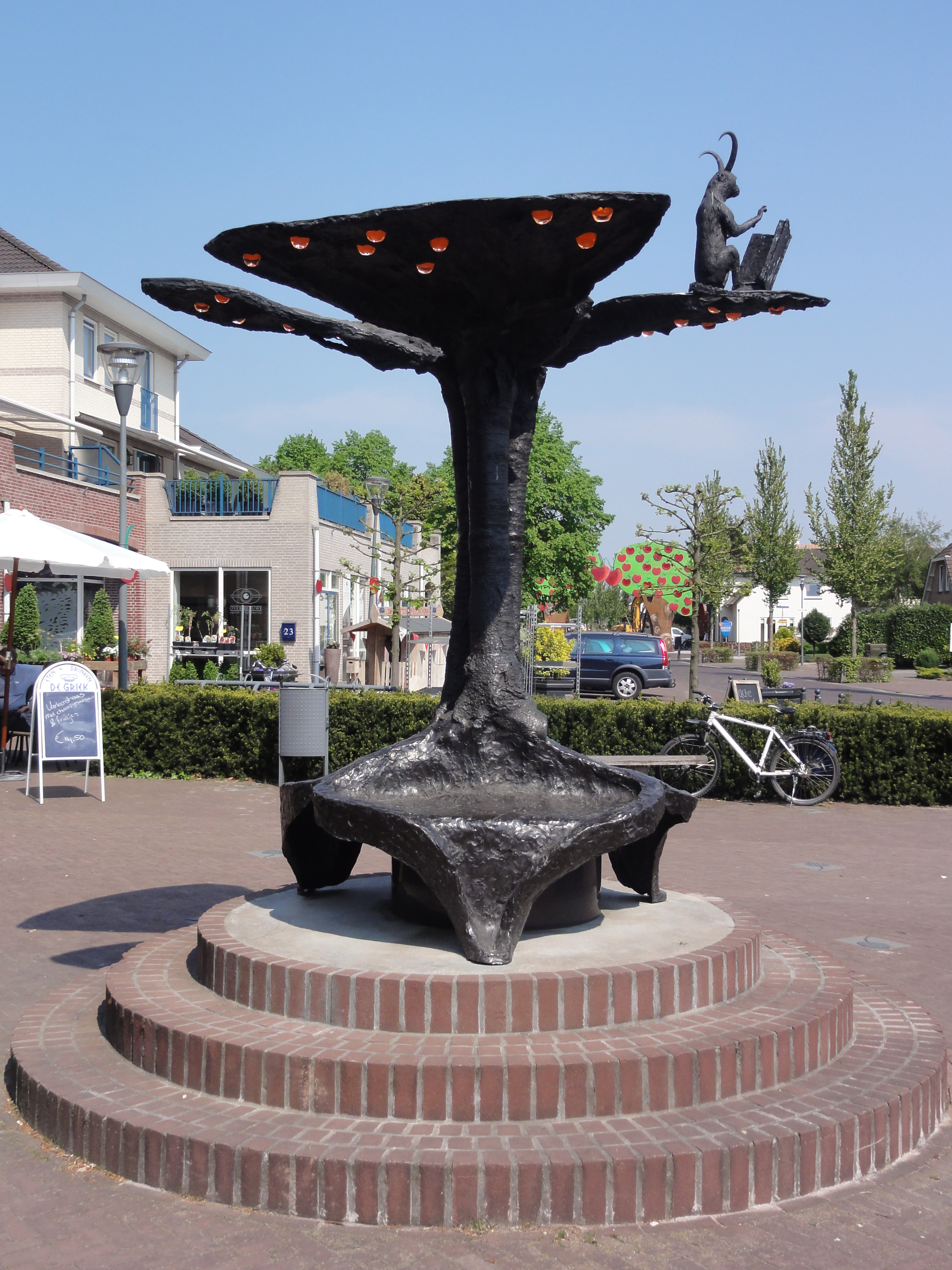
Statue

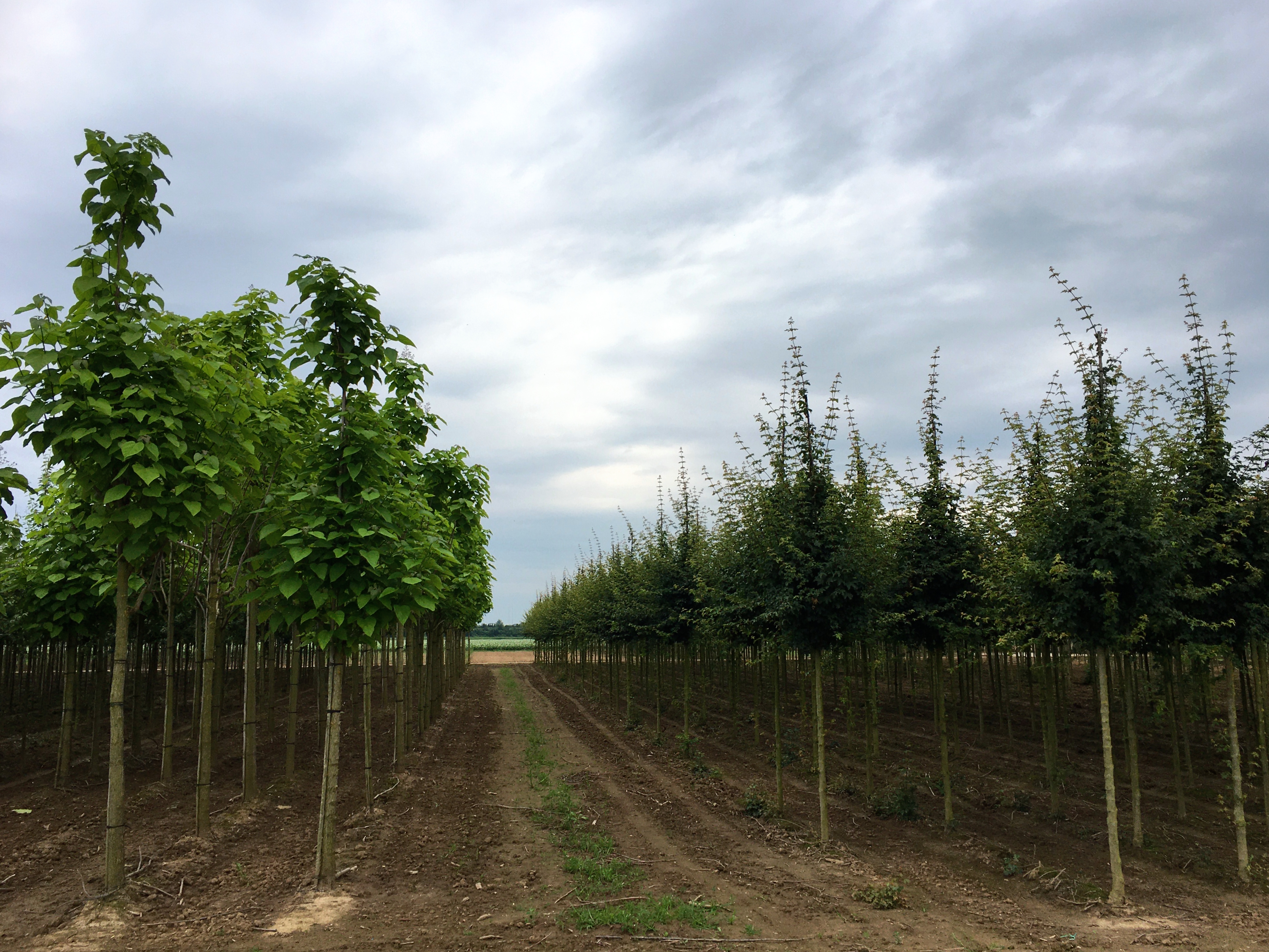
Tree plantation
