= Loenen (disambiguation) =

Loenen is a former municipality in the province of Utrecht, Netherlands.

Loenen may also refer to:

- Loenen, Apeldoorn, a village in the province of Gelderland, Netherlands

== See also ==
- Loenen-Kronenburg, a former municipality (1817-1819) in the province of North Holland, Netherlands
- Loenen en Wolferen or Overbetuwe, a municipality in the province of Gelderland, Netherlands
