= Lijnden, Gelderland =

Lijnden
- Hamlet
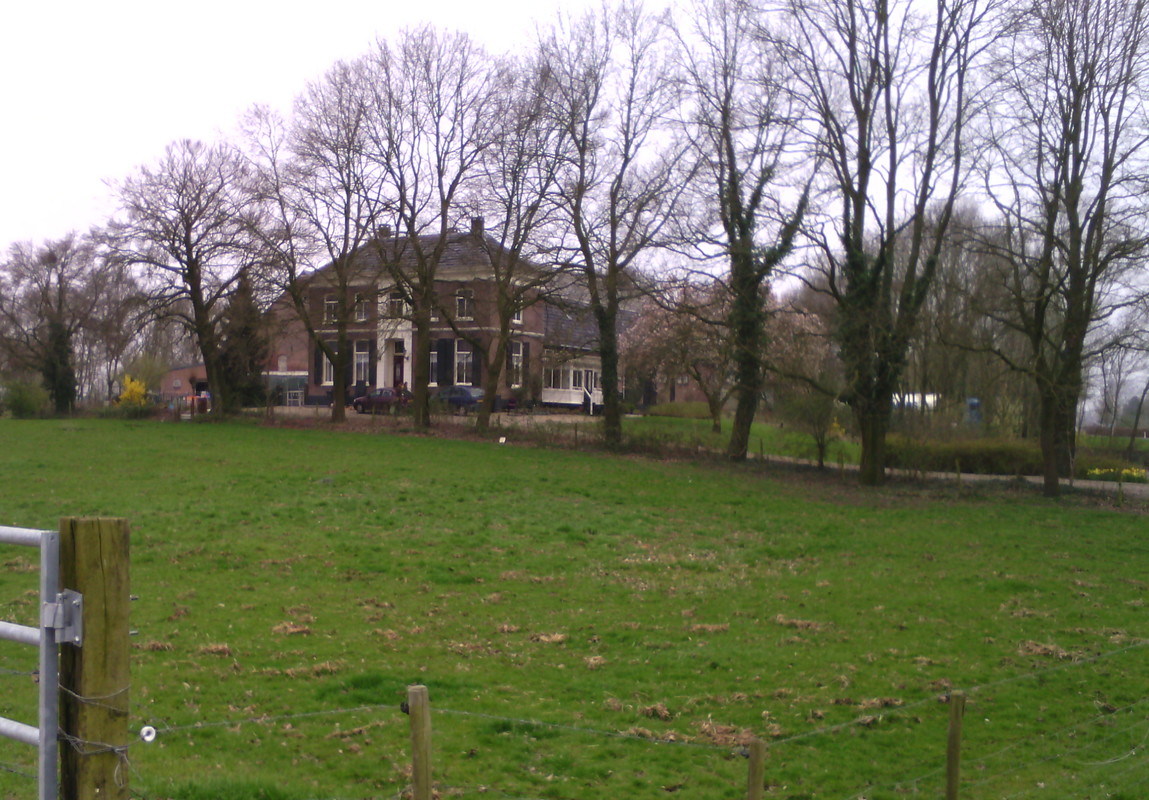
- Farm in Lijnden

- Location in the Netherlands Lijnden (Netherlands)
- Coordinates: 51°55′00″N 5°48′57″E
- Country: Netherlands
- Province: Gelderland
- Municipality: Overbetuwe
- Elevation: 9 m (30 ft)
- Time zone: UTC+1 (CET)
  - Summer (DST): UTC+2 (CEST)
- Postal code: 6661
- Dialing code: 0481

Lijnden is a hamlet in the Dutch province of Gelderland. It is located in the municipality of Overbetuwe, about 2 km west of the town of Elst.

It was first mentioned in the 11th century as Haimo de Lino. The etymology is unknown. It is not a statistical entity, and the postal authorities have placed it under Elst. In 1840, it was home to 337 people.
