= Loenen en Wolferen =

Coordinates: 51°53′N 5°47′E

Loenen en Wolferen is a former municipality in the Dutch province of Gelderland. It existed from 1818 to 1854, when it became a part of Valburg. The area is now part of the municipality of Overbetuwe.

The municipality covered the two hamlets of Loenen and Wolferen.
