= Heteren =

- Village
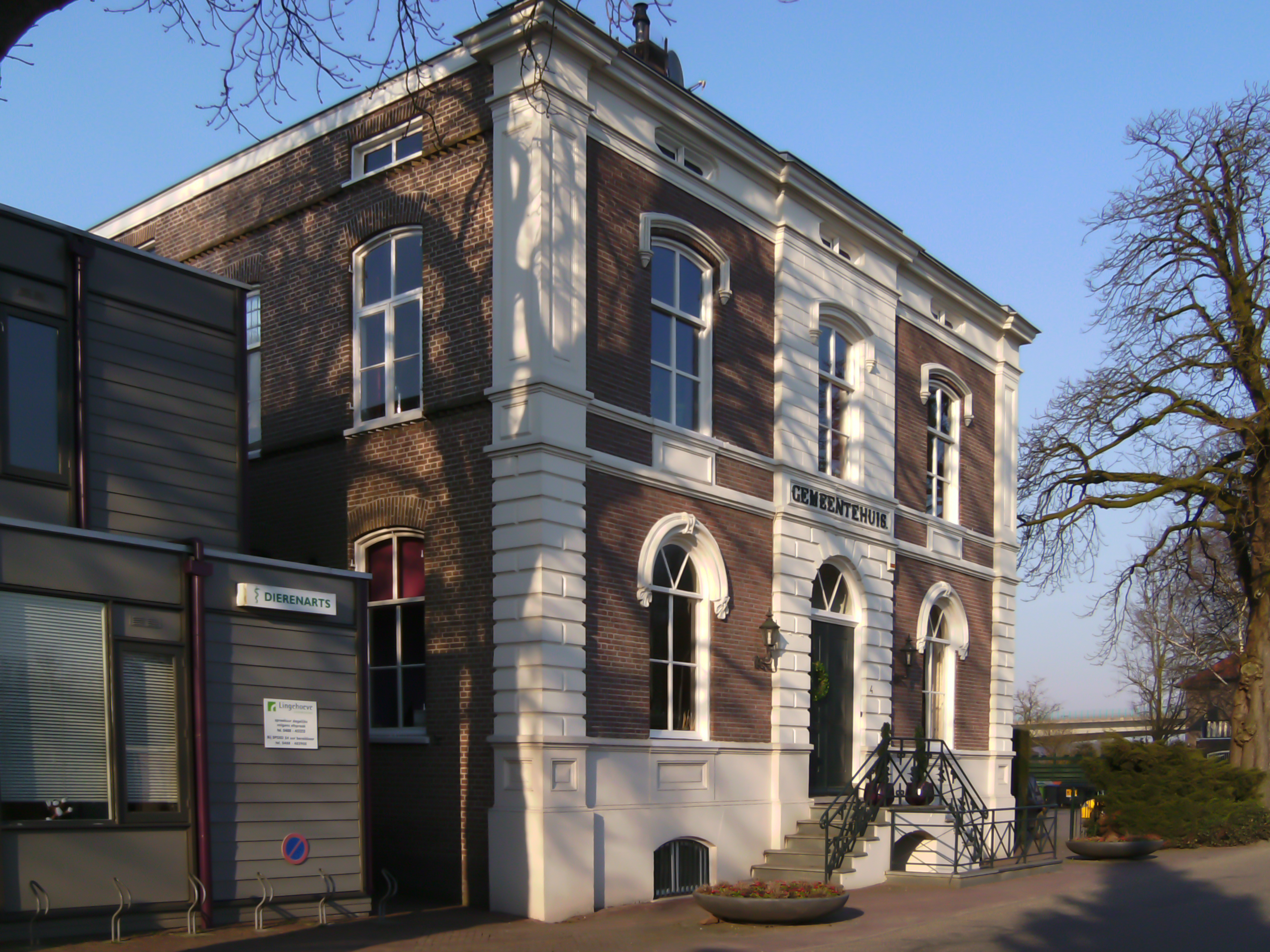
- Former town hall

- Flag Coat of arms

- Location in the Netherlands Heteren (Netherlands)
- Coordinates: 51°57′27″N 5°45′18″E
- Country: Netherlands
- Province: Gelderland
- Municipality: Overbetuwe

Area
  - Total: 1.96 km^{2} (0.76 sq mi)
- Elevation: 11 m (36 ft)

Population (2021)
  - Total: 4,670
  - Density: 2,380/km^{2} (6,170/sq mi)
- Time zone: UTC+1 (CET)
  - Summer (DST): UTC+2 (CEST)
- Postal code: 6666
- Dialing code: 026

Heteren (Dutch pronunciation: [ˈɦeːtərə(n)]) is a village in the Dutch province of Gelderland. It is located in the municipality of Overbetuwe, about 12 km (7.4 mi) southwest of Arnhem on the south bank of the Rhine.

Heteren was a separate municipality until 2001, when it became a part of the new municipality of Overbetuwe. Heteren is home to the main distribution centre of leading Dutch pharmacy chain Kruidvat.

== Gallery ==
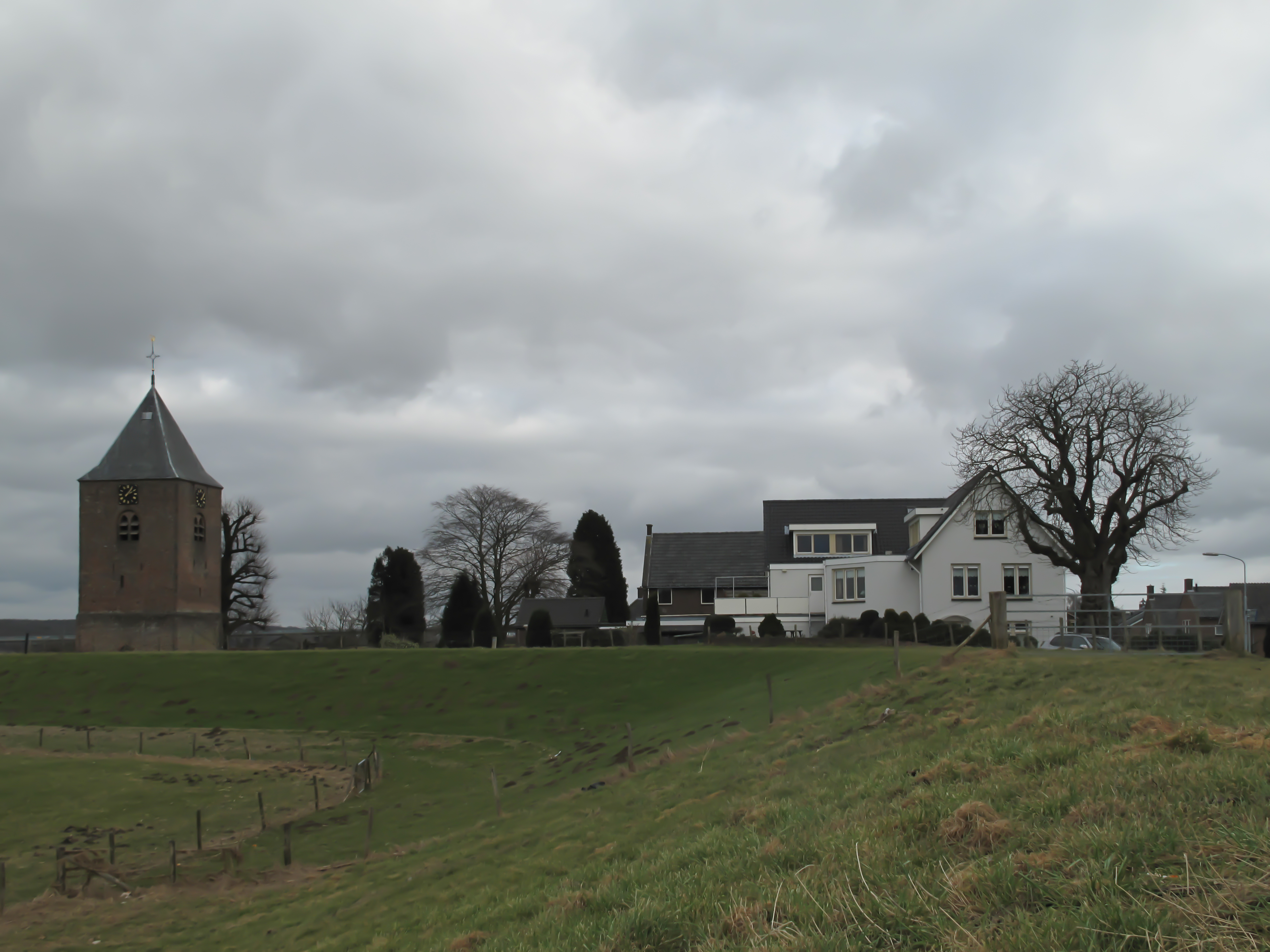
Tower in the street

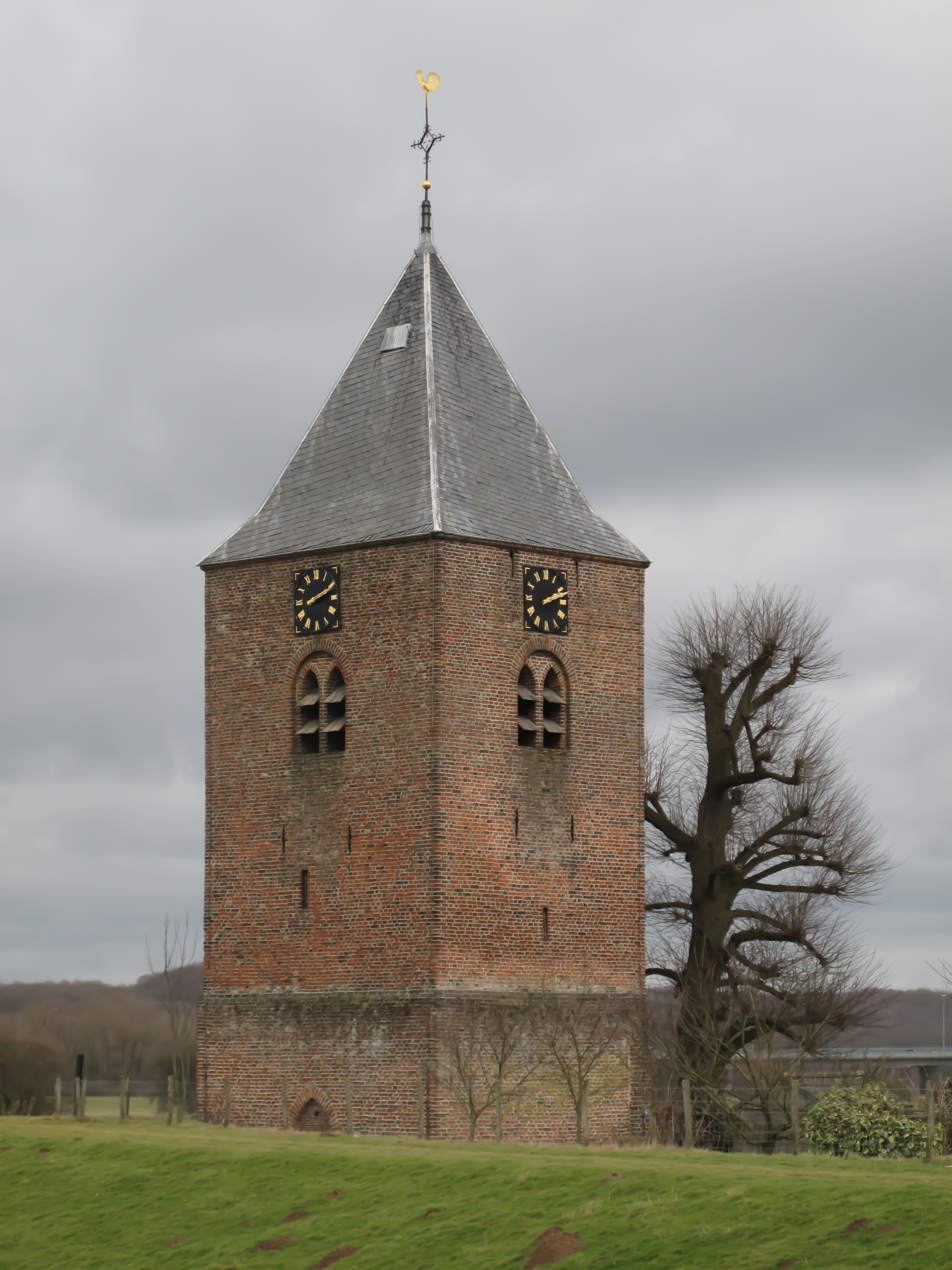
Tower near churchyard

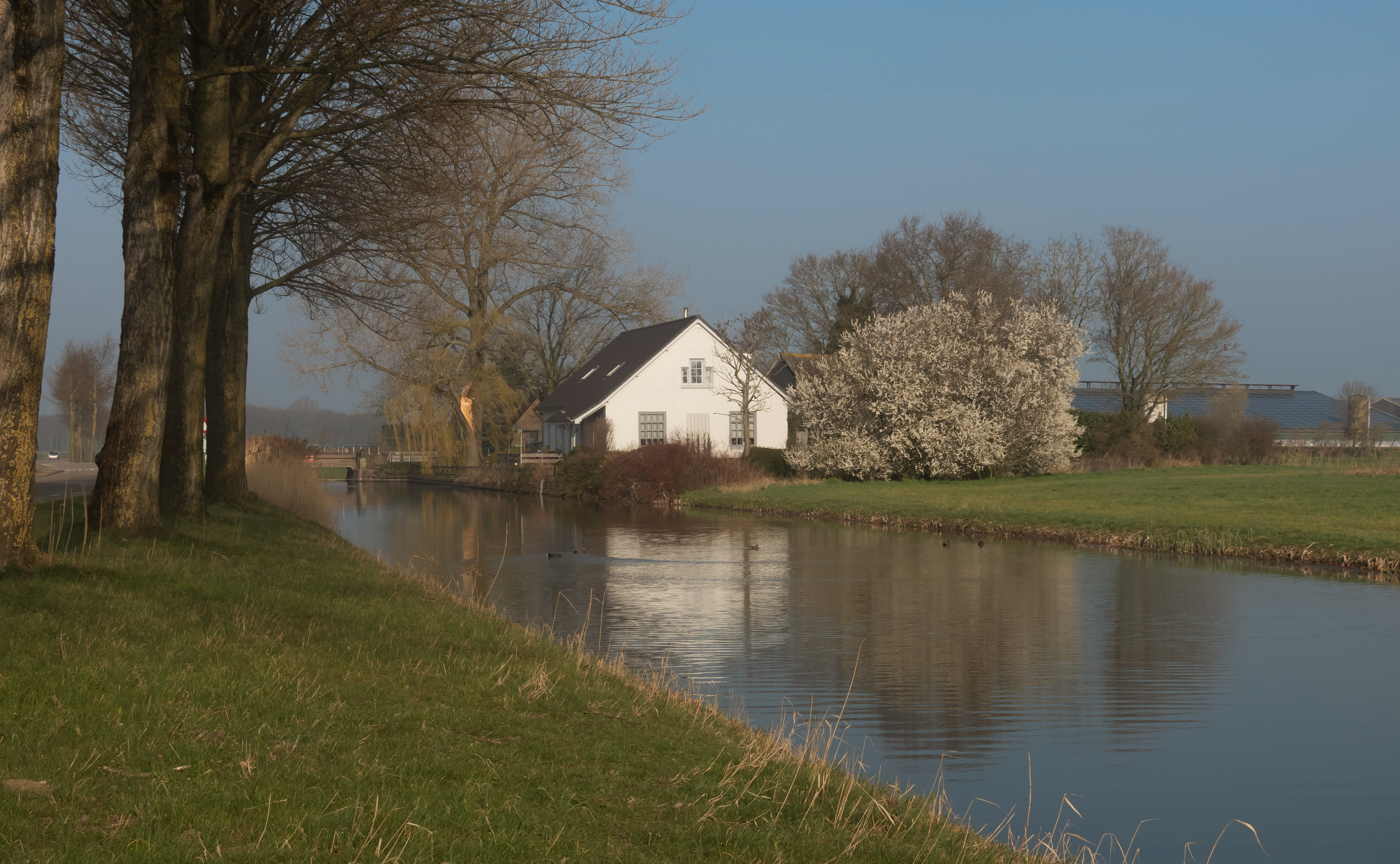
Farmhouse at the Muskushouwstraat
