= Slijk-Ewijk =

- Village
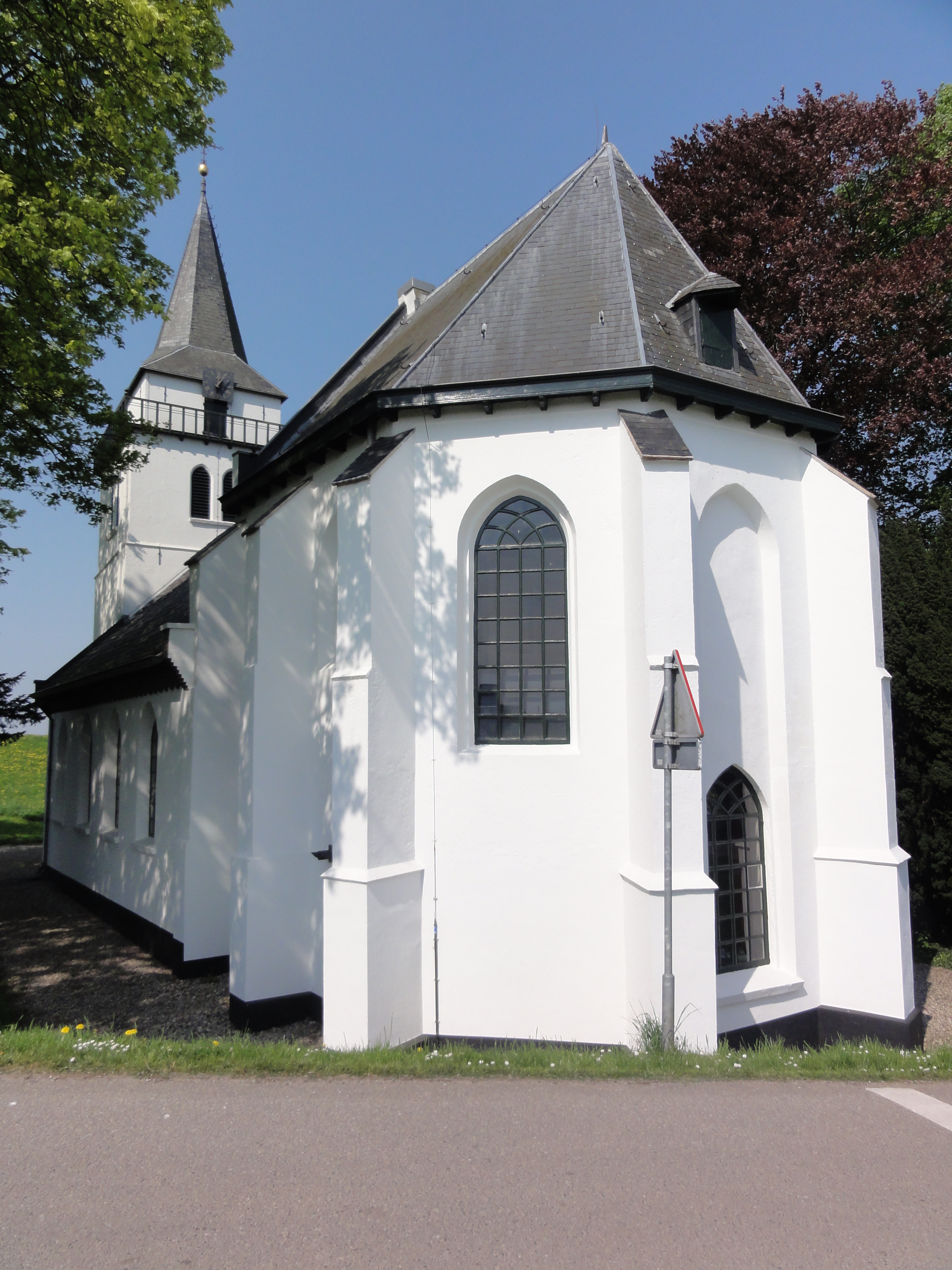
- Church of Slijk-Ewijk

- Location in the Netherlands Slijk-Ewijk (Netherlands)
- Coordinates: 51°53′N 5°47′E
- Country: Netherlands
- Province: Gelderland
- Municipality: Overbetuwe

Area
  - Total: 8.19 km^{2} (3.16 sq mi)
- Elevation: 10 m (33 ft)

Population (2021)
  - Total: 490
  - Density: 60/km^{2} (150/sq mi)
- Time zone: UTC+1 (CET)
  - Summer (DST): UTC+2 (CEST)
- Postal code: 6677
- Dialing code: 0481

Slijk-Ewijk (Dutch pronunciation: [ˌslɛi̯k ˈeːʋɛi̯k]) is a village in the municipality of Overbetuwe in the province of Gelderland, the Netherlands.

It was first mentioned in 1573 as SlijckEwick. The etymology is unknown. The village developed into a linear settlement on artificial mounds. The tower of the Dutch Reformed Church probably dates from the 14th century. The church is mainly a 1912 construction. Huis Loenen is an estate which was constructed around 1825 on the location of a medieval castle. In 1840, it was home to 371 people.

== Gallery ==
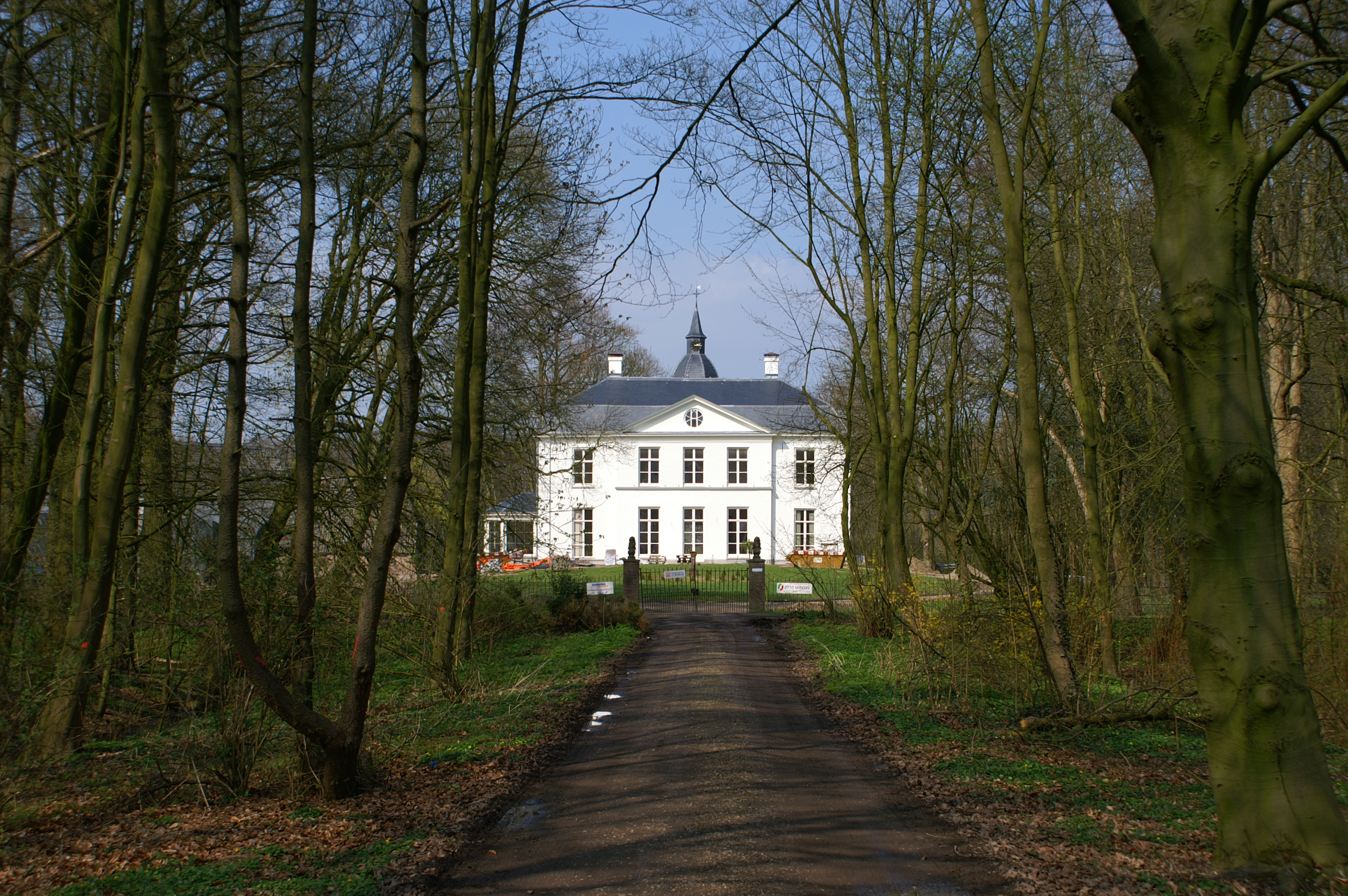
Loenen Estate

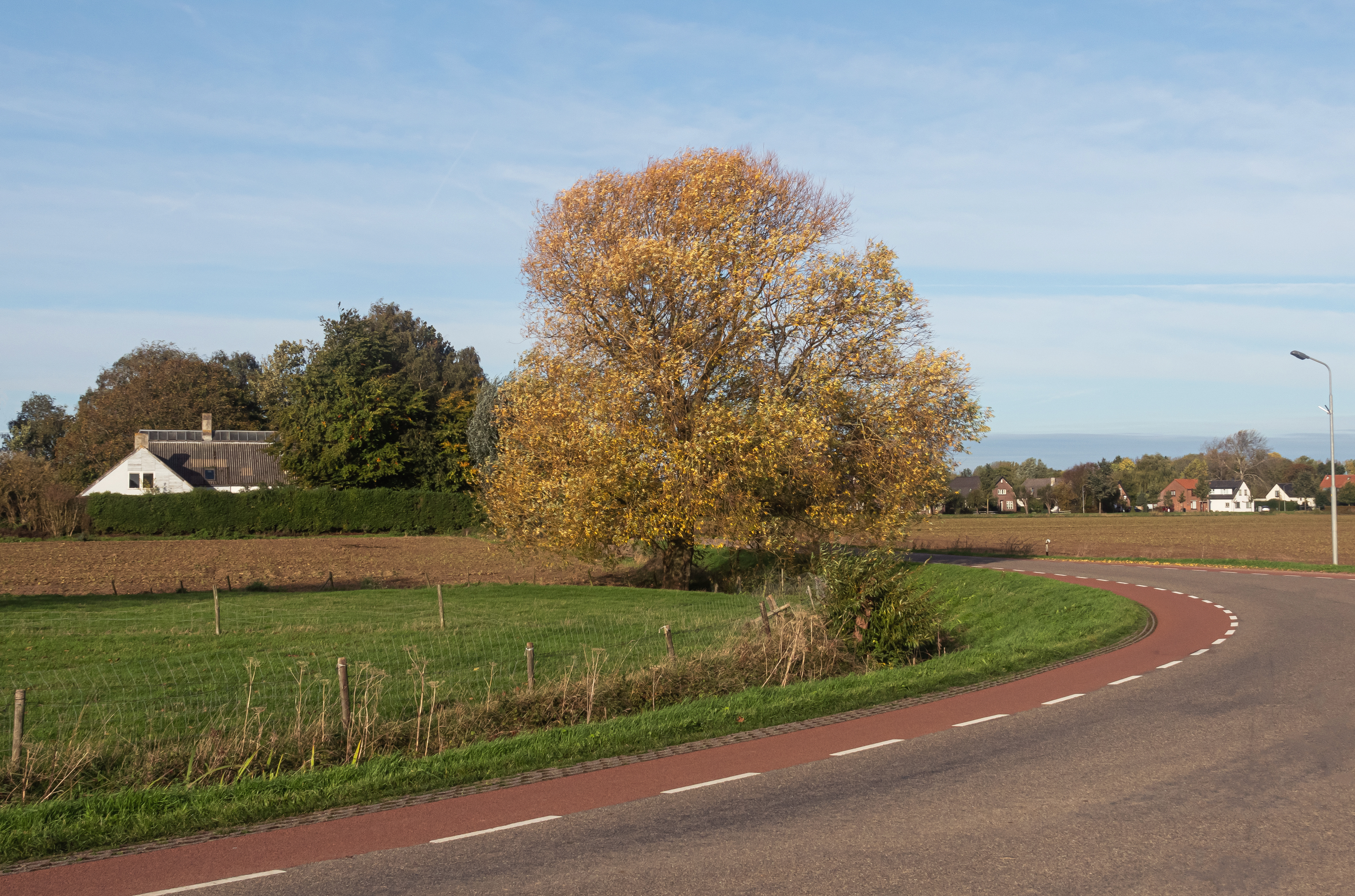
Street view: the Valburgsestraat
