= Andelst =

- Village
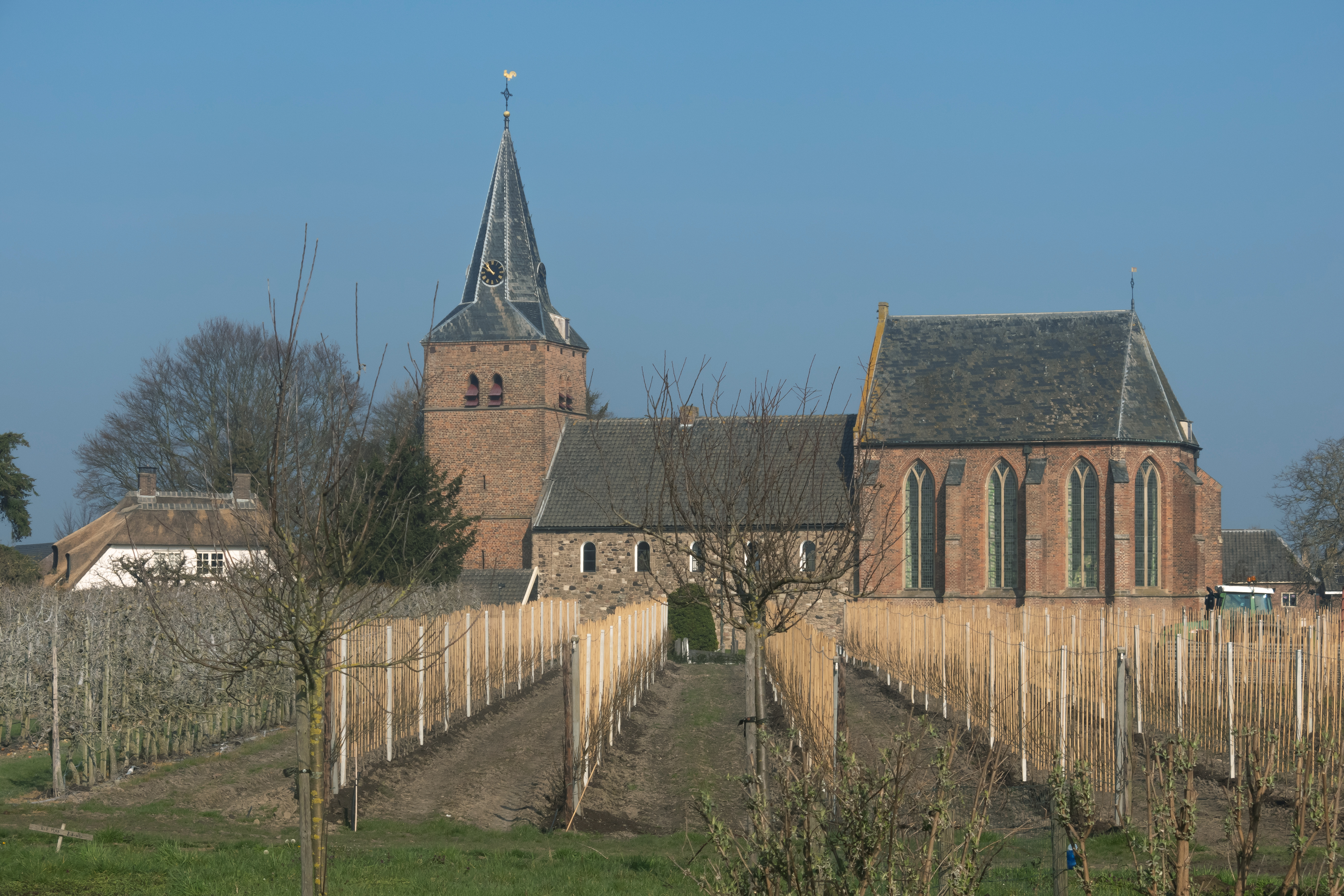
- Church of Andelst

- Location in the Netherlands Andelst (Netherlands)
- Coordinates: 51°54′25″N 5°43′40″E
- Country: Netherlands
- Province: Gelderland
- Municipality: Overbetuwe

Area
  - Total: 6.65 km^{2} (2.57 sq mi)
- Elevation: 8 m (26 ft)

Population (2021)
  - Total: 1,655
  - Density: 249/km^{2} (645/sq mi)
- Time zone: UTC+1 (CET)
  - Summer (DST): UTC+2 (CEST)
- Postal code: 6673
- Dialing code: 0488

Andelst (Dutch pronunciation: [ˈɑndəlst]) is a village in the Dutch province of Gelderland. It is located in the municipality Overbetuwe, about 10 km northwest of the city of Nijmegen.

== History ==
It is an old village; the first known mention dates from 855, as Andassale, and means "hall of Ando (person)". The village developed on a high ridge and has been inhabited since the Roman period. The church has a tower from around 1400 and has been extensively restored between 1928 and 1930. In 1327, the Duke of Gelre established a legal court in Andelst. There used to be a little castle near Andelst, but it was demolished in 1846. In 1840, Andelst was home to 508 people.

== Gallery ==
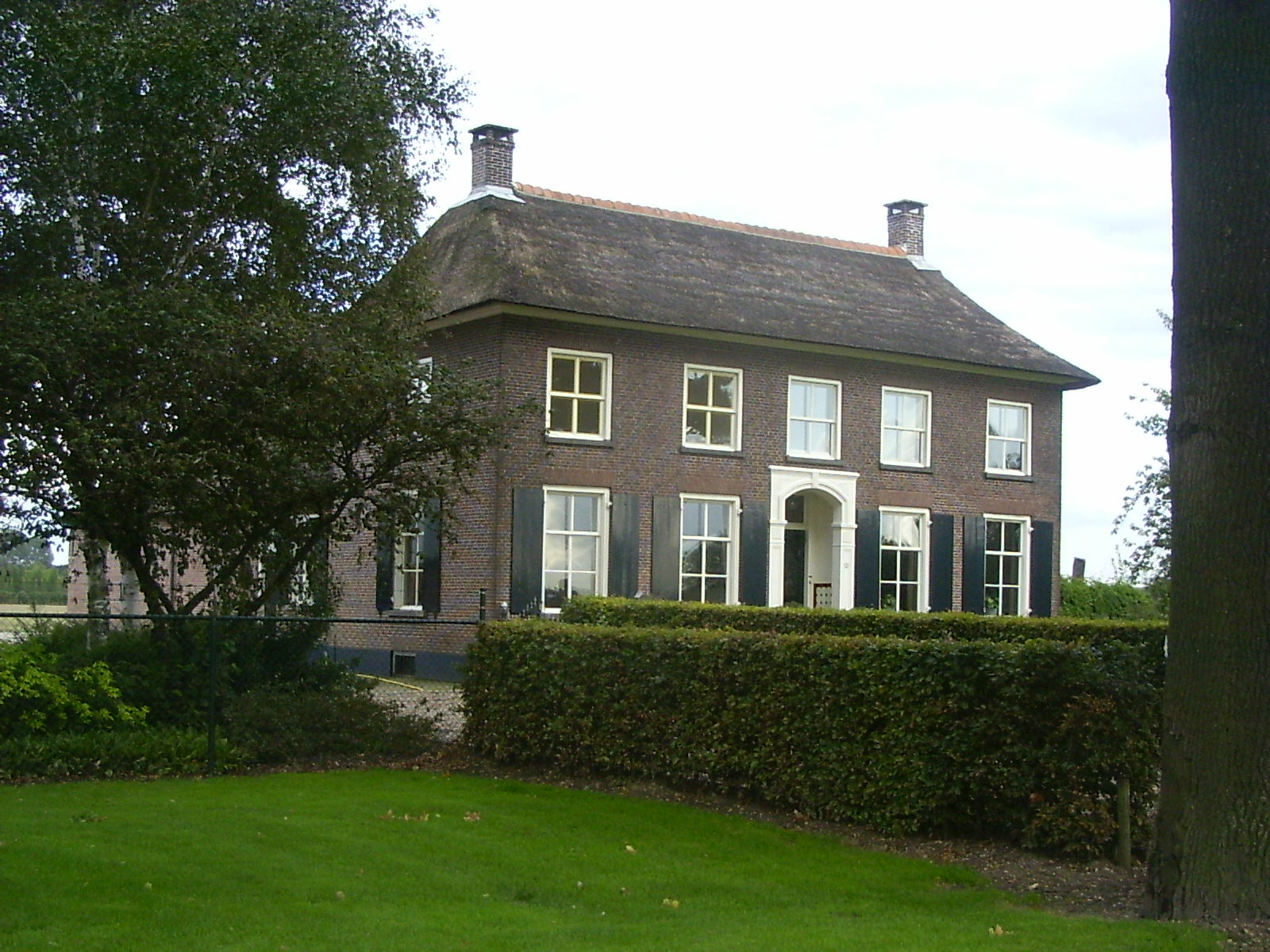
Farm in Andelst

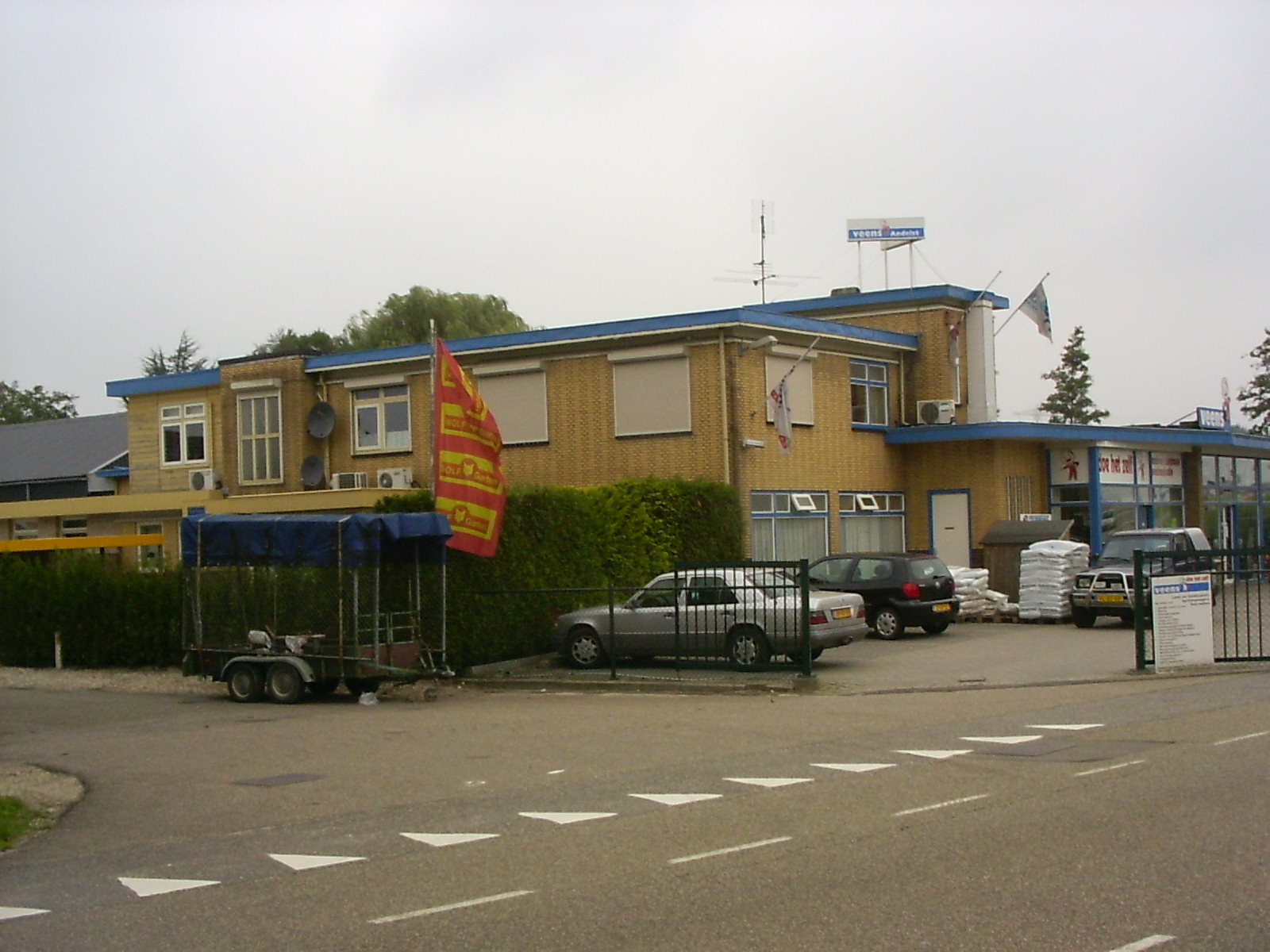
Former bus depot

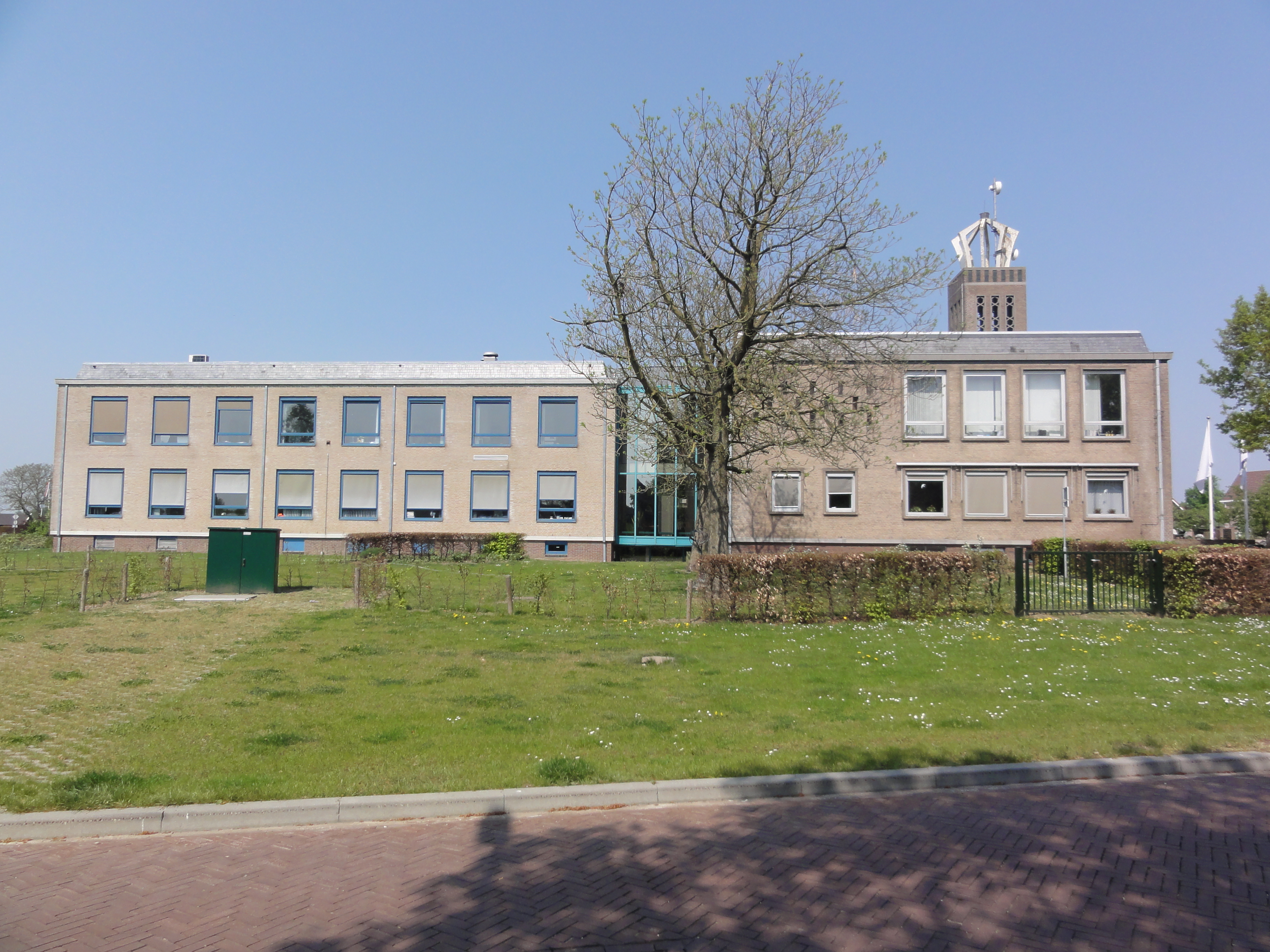
Town hall

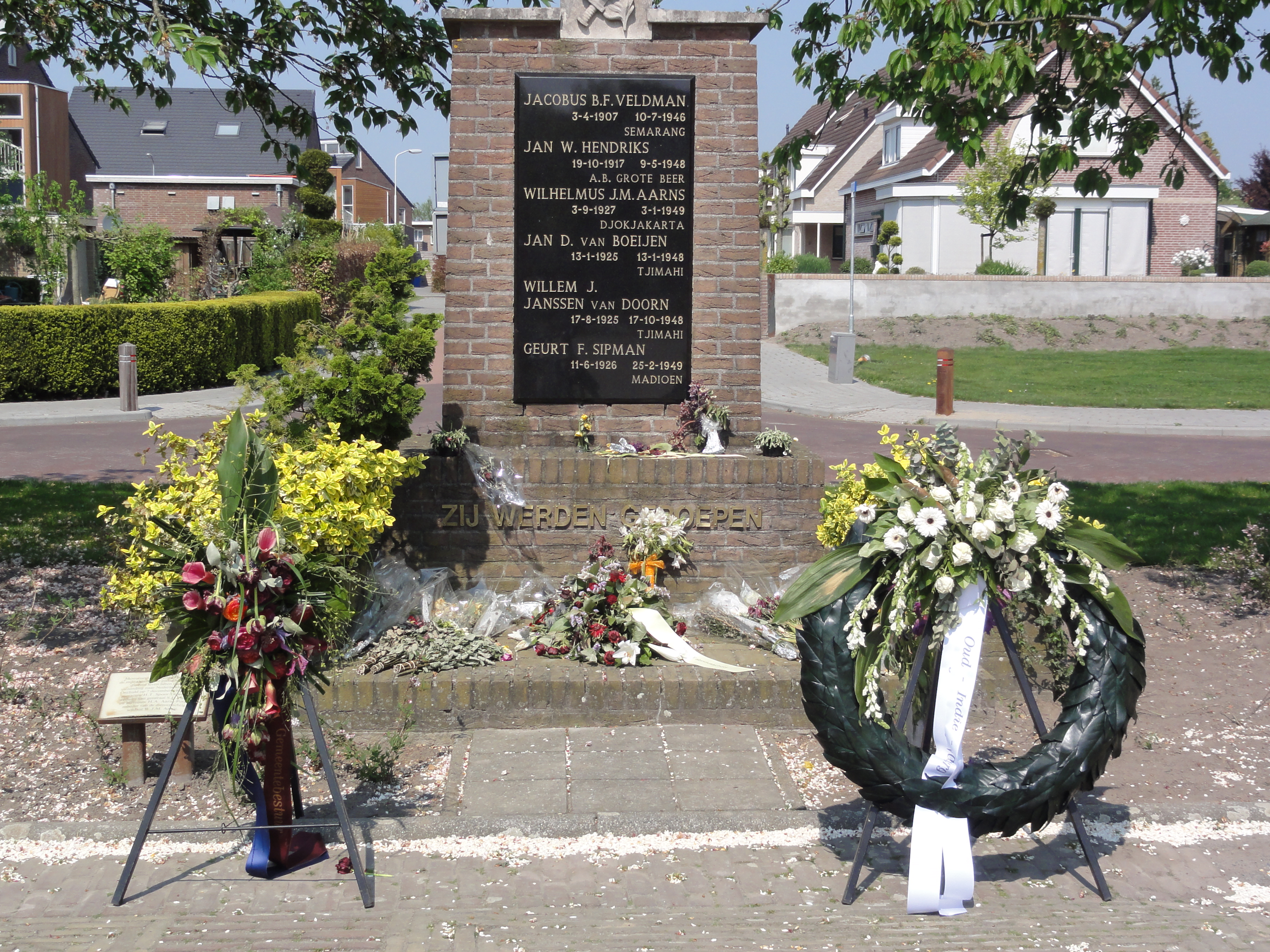
Dutch East Indies monument
