= Loenen-Kronenburg =

Coordinates: 52°12′35″N 5°01′25″E

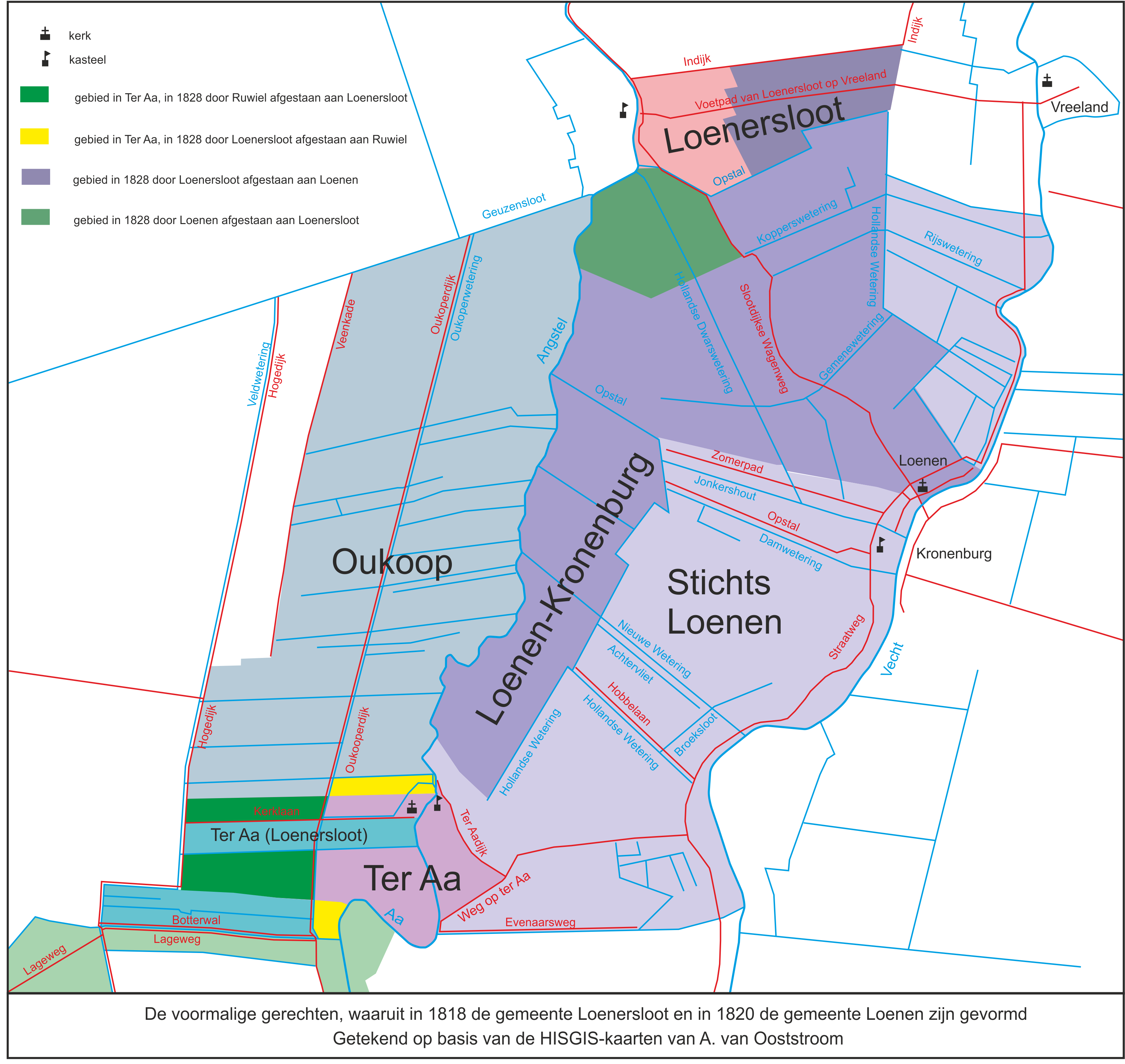
Loenen-Kronenburg (in dark purple)

Loenen-Kronenburg was a Dutch municipality from 1817 to '19. Its former territory is now part of Loenen in the province of Utrecht.

From 1814 to '17, the municipality of Loenen lay partly in the province of Holland and partly that of Utrecht. In 1817 the portion in Holland became the separate municipality of Loenen-Kronenburg. In 1819, the boundaries of the province of Utrecht were enlarged to encompass Loenen-Kronenburg, which was subsequently merged back into Loenen.
