= Valburg =

- Village
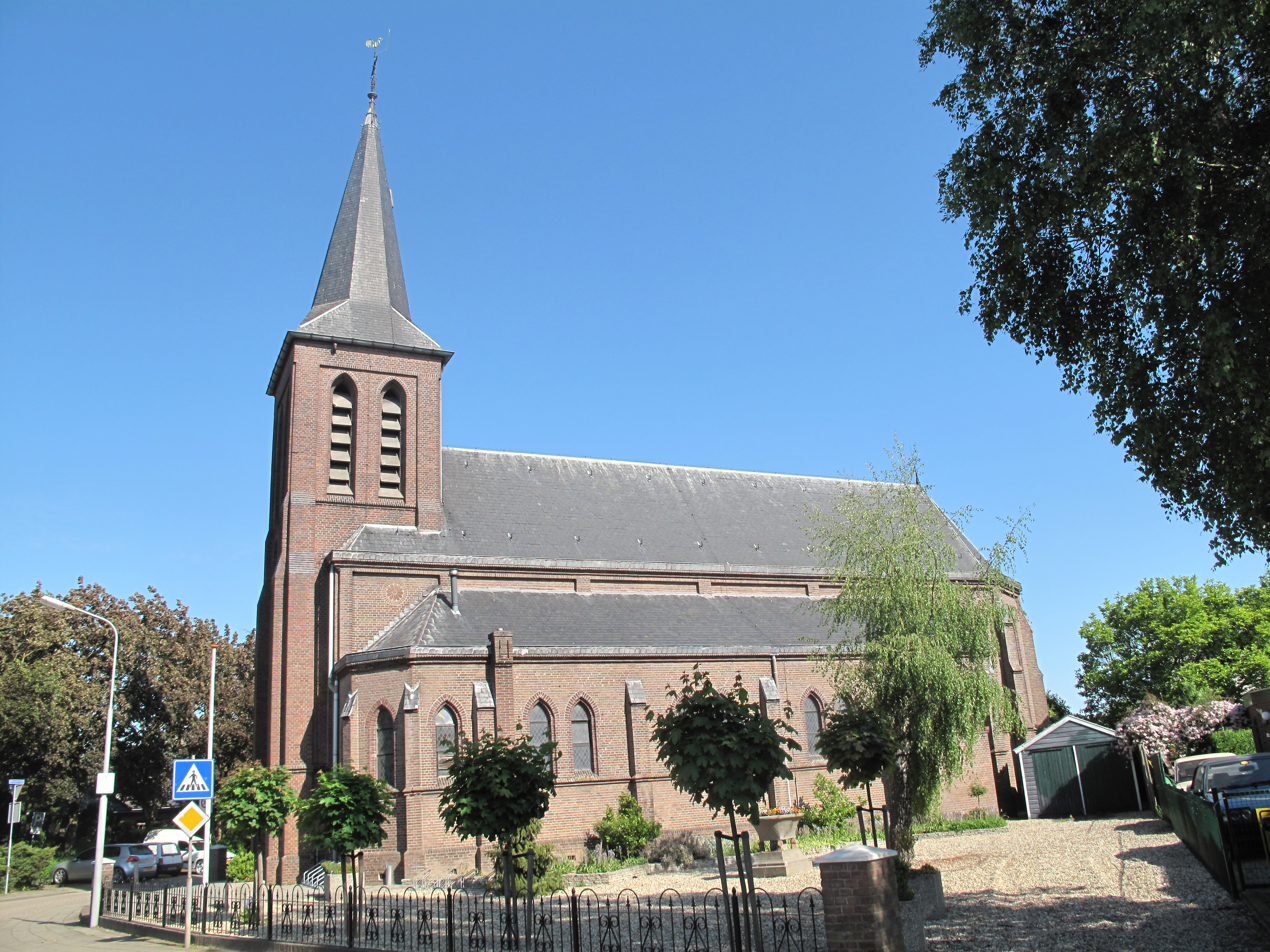
- Valburg, catholic church Jacobuskerk

- Coat of arms

- Location in the Netherlands Valburg (Netherlands)
- Coordinates: 51°54′40″N 5°47′21″E
- Country: Netherlands
- Province: Gelderland
- Municipality: Overbetuwe

Area
  - Total: 9.90 km^{2} (3.82 sq mi)
- Elevation: 9 m (30 ft)

Population (2021)
  - Total: 1,895
  - Density: 191/km^{2} (496/sq mi)
- Time zone: UTC+1 (CET)
  - Summer (DST): UTC+2 (CEST)
- Postal code: 6675
- Dialing code: 0488

Valburg (Dutch pronunciation: [ˈvɑlbʏr(ə)x]) is a village in the Dutch province of Gelderland. It is located in the municipality of Overbetuwe, about 10 km northwest of Nijmegen.

Valburg was a separate municipality until 2001, when it became part of Overbetuwe.

== History ==
It was first mentioned in 792 or 793 as "in uilla Falburcmarca", and means "the castle of Falho (person)". The eastern side of the village developed into an esdorp. The Dutch Reformed Church dates from the 14th century with a 13th-century tower. It has been restored between 1968 and 1971. The grist mill Nieuw Leven was built in 1750 and restored in 1996. In 1840, it was home to 688 people.

== Gallery ==
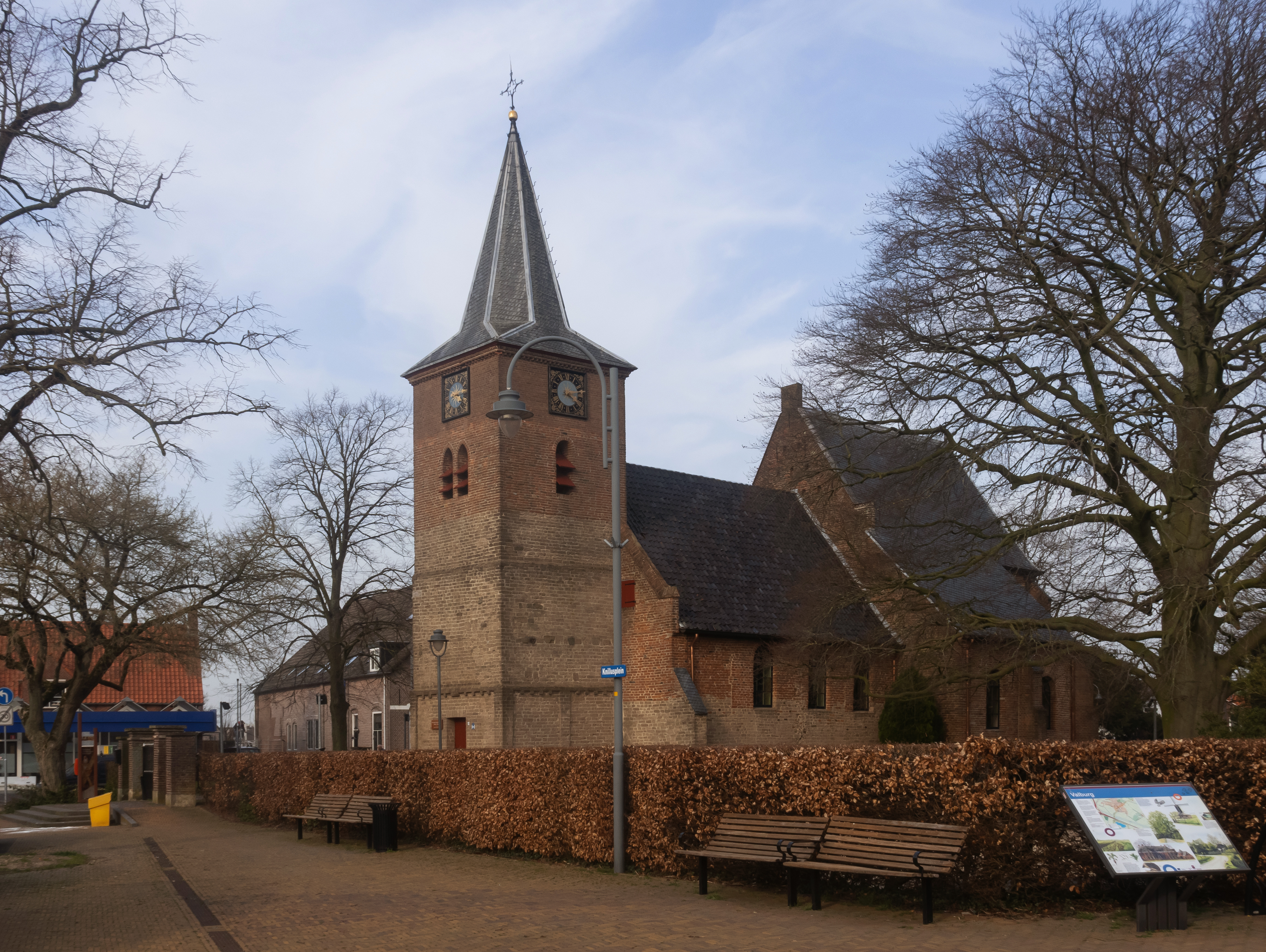
Valburg, Dutch Reformed church

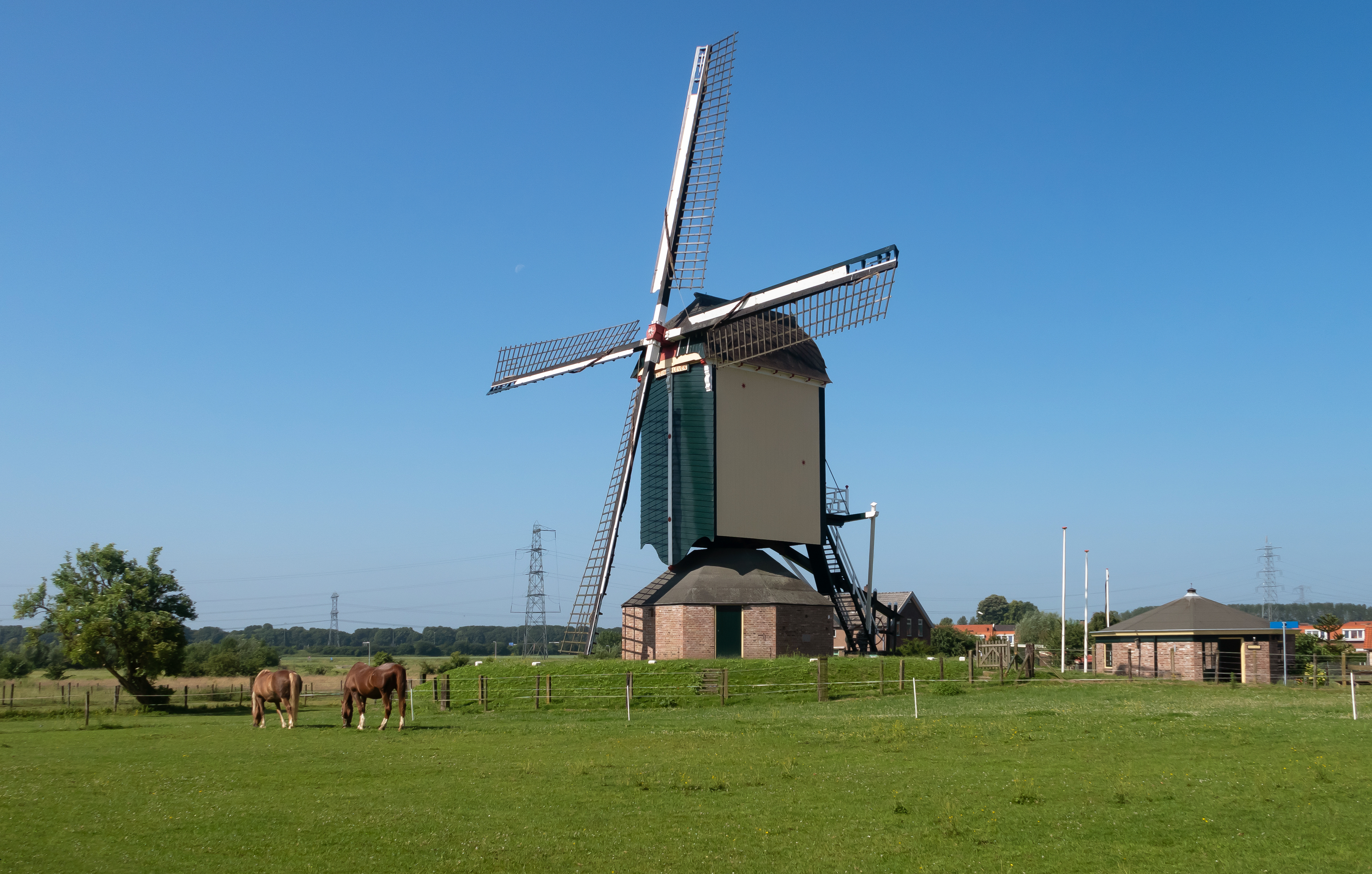
Valburg, windmill: Nieuw Leven

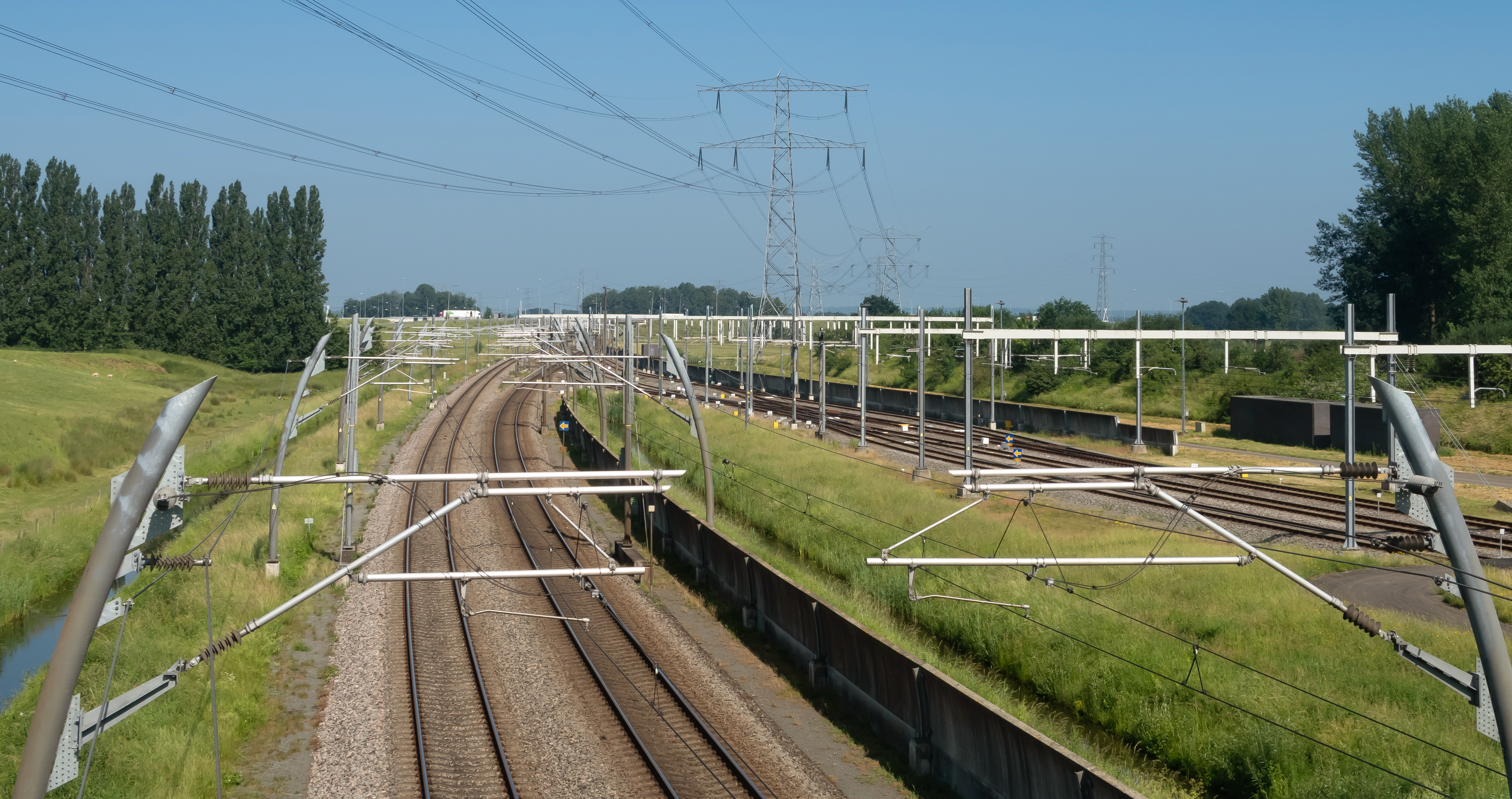
Valburg, the Betuwelijn from the railway viaduct

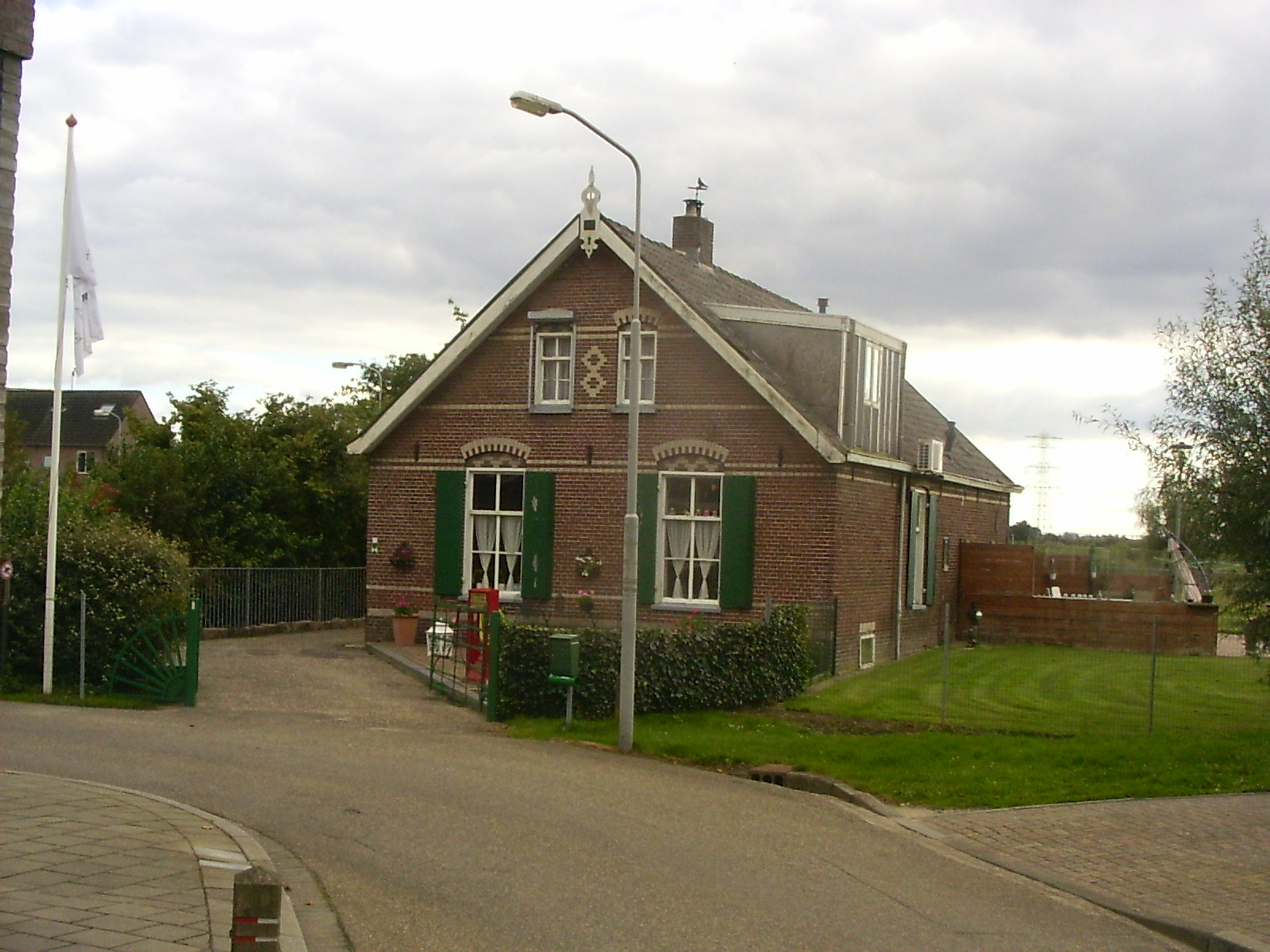
House in Valburg
