= Overbetuwe =

- Municipality
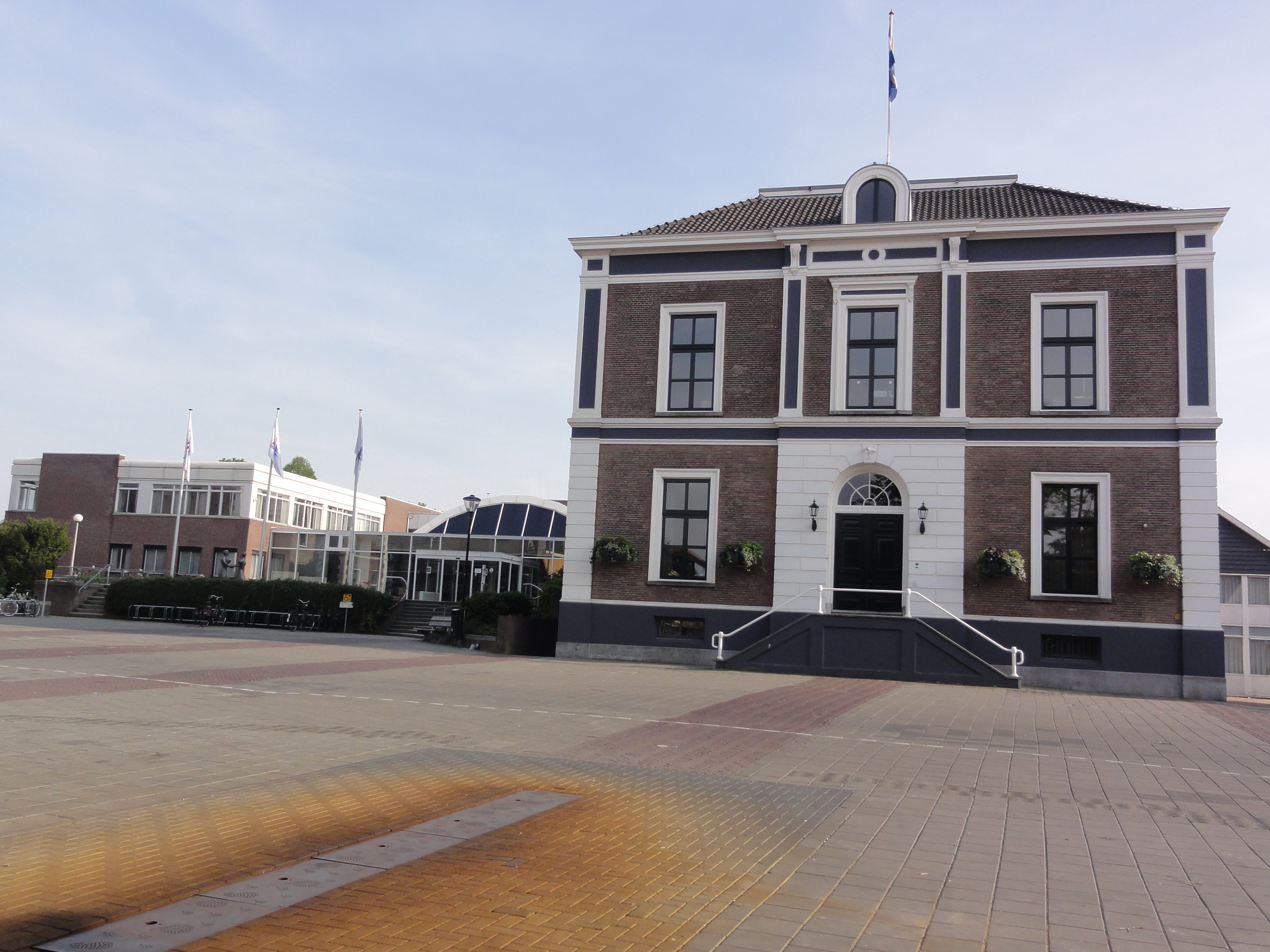
- Overbetuwe town hall

- Flag Coat of arms

- Location in Gelderland
- Coordinates: 51°55′N 5°51′E
- Country: Netherlands
- Province: Gelderland
- Established: 1 January 2001

Government
  - Body: Municipal council
  - Mayor: Patricia Hoytink-Roubos

Area
  - Total: 115.08 km^{2} (44.43 sq mi)
  - Land: 109.19 km^{2} (42.16 sq mi)
  - Water: 5.89 km^{2} (2.27 sq mi)
- Elevation: 10 m (33 ft)

Population (January 2021)
  - Total: 48,214
  - Density: 442/km^{2} (1,140/sq mi)
- Time zone: UTC+1 (CET)
  - Summer (DST): UTC+2 (CEST)
- Postcode: 6660–6662, 6665–6668, 6670–6678
- Area code: 026, 0481, 0488
- Website: www.overbetuwe.nl

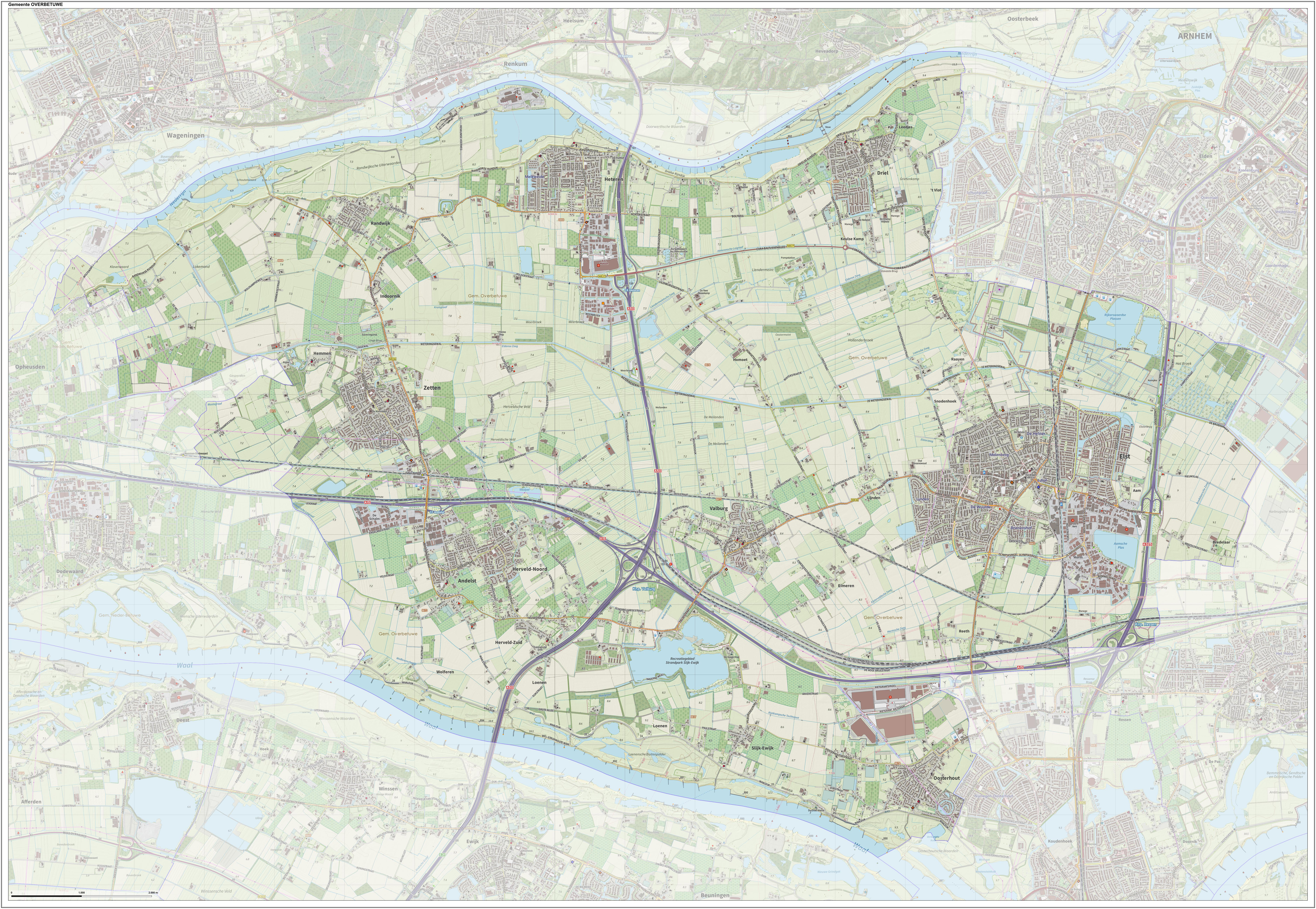
Map of municipality of Overbetuwe, June 2015

Overbetuwe (Dutch pronunciation: [ˌoːvərˈbeːtyu.ə]) is a municipality in the province of Gelderland in the Netherlands. It was formed on 1 January 2001 as a merger of three former municipalities: Elst, Heteren and Valburg. Overbetuwe is bordered in the north by the river Rhine and in the south by the river Waal. The town hall is located in Elst, the largest town in the municipality. Since 2021 it has been part of the Arnhem-Nijmegen Green Metropolitan Region (Dutch: Groene Metropoolregio Arnhem-Nijmegen, which aids planning and development in the region's eighteen municipalities.

== Towns ==
Town	Inhabitants (2015)
Andelst	1,650
Driel	4,205
Elst	21,554
Hemmen	184
Herveld	3,015
Heteren	5,109
Homoet	76
Loenen	47
Oosterhout (partly)	2,337
Randwijk	1,435
Slijk-Ewijk	479
Valburg	1,780
Zetten	5,002

== Transportation ==
Because of its central location between the cities of Nijmegen and Arnhem, many inhabitants of Overbetuwe commute to these cities. Three major highways are situated in the municipality; the A50, A15 and A325. Overbetuwe has two railway stations: Elst and Zetten-Andelst. A freight line called the Betuweroute, operational since 2007, crosses the area.

== Politics ==
The gemeenteraad (local council) of Overbetuwe consists of 29 seats. Below is the composition of the council since 2006:

Gemeenteraadszetels
Party	2006	2010	2014	2018	2022	2026
Gemeentebelangen Overbetuwe	5	5	4	4	8	10
CDA	7	7	13	9	7	6
GroenLinks / PvdA	-	-	-	-	-	4
PvdA	6	4	1	2	1	*
D66	3	5	5	4	3	4
VVD	3	5	2	3	3	3
GroenLinks	2	2	2	4	3	*
Lijst BOB	-	-	-	-	-	1
SGP	-	-	-	-	-	1
ChristenUnie	1	1	1	1	1	-
Burgerbelangen Overbetuwe	-	-	1	2	3	-
Total	27	29	29	29	29	29

* 2026: Combined list for GroenLinks and PvdA.

== Gallery ==
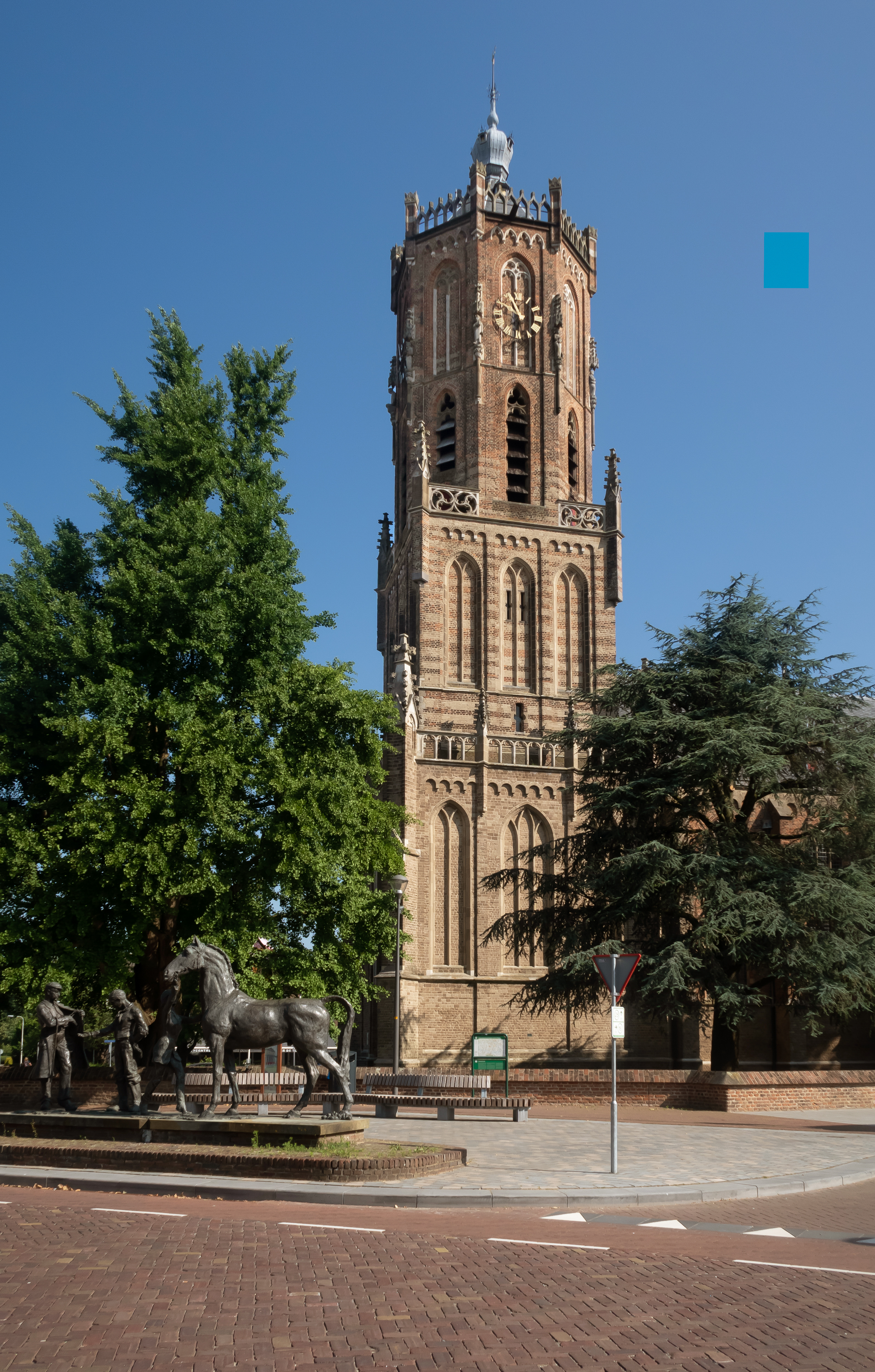
Elst, church

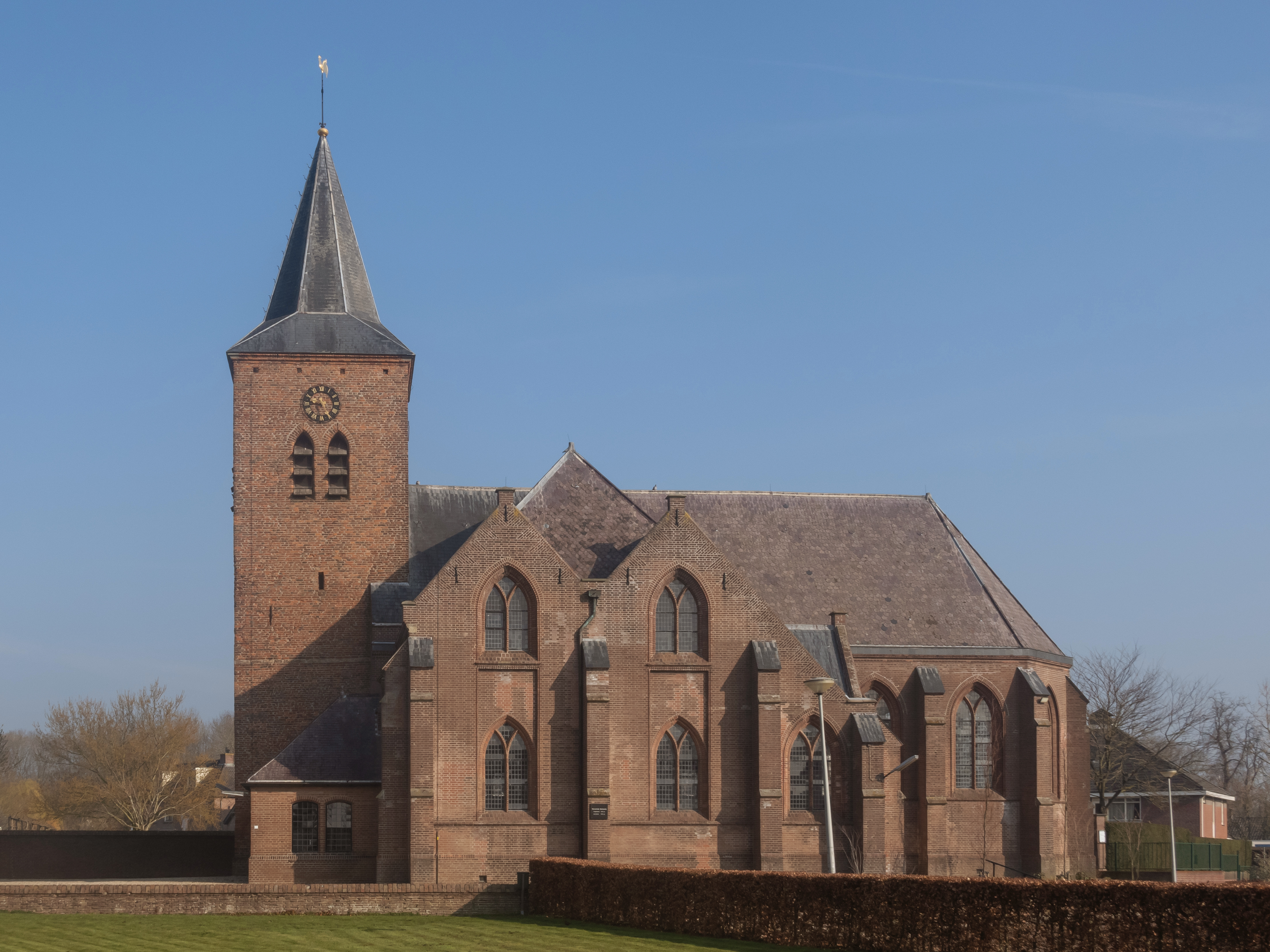
Zetten, Village Church

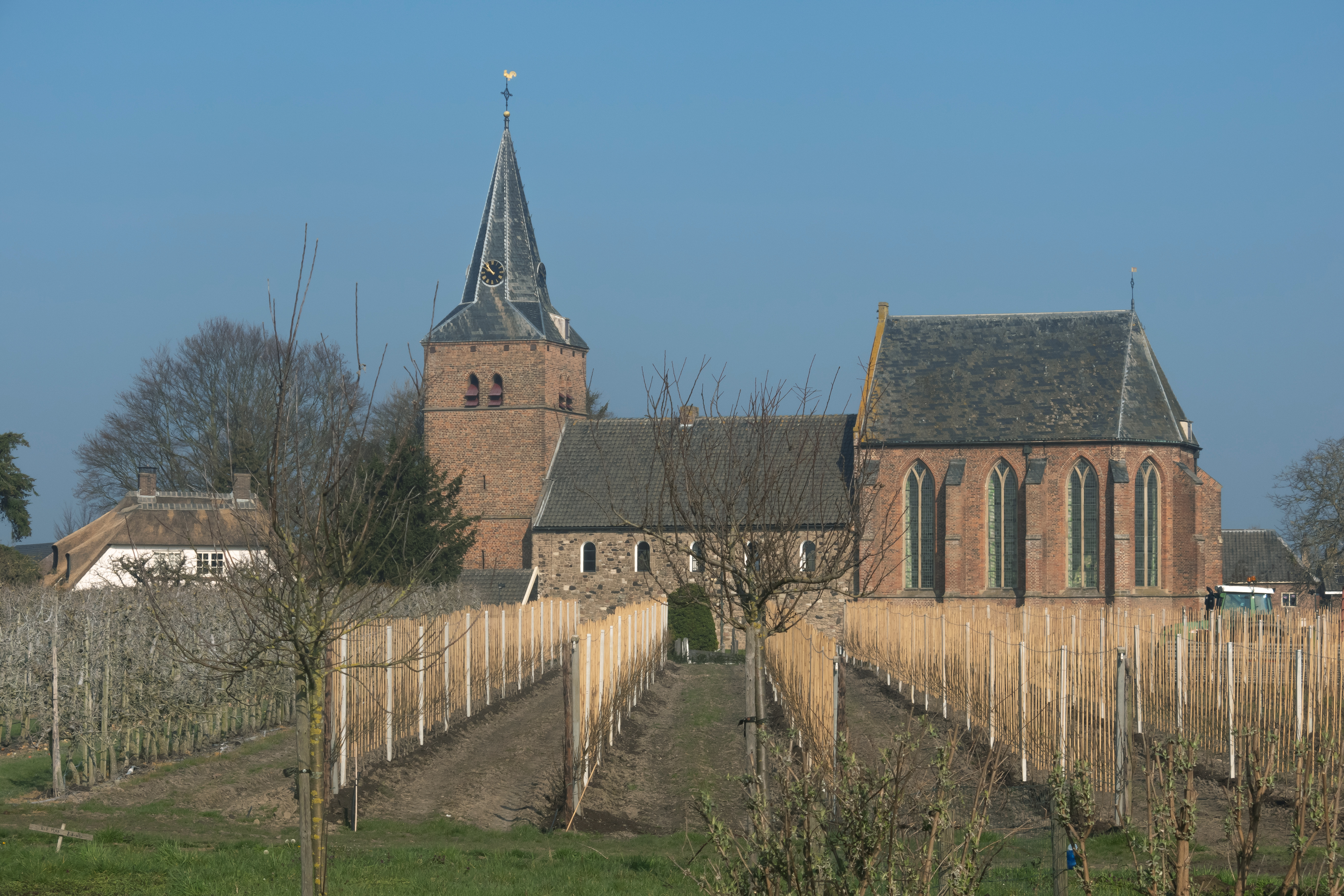
Andelst, reformed church

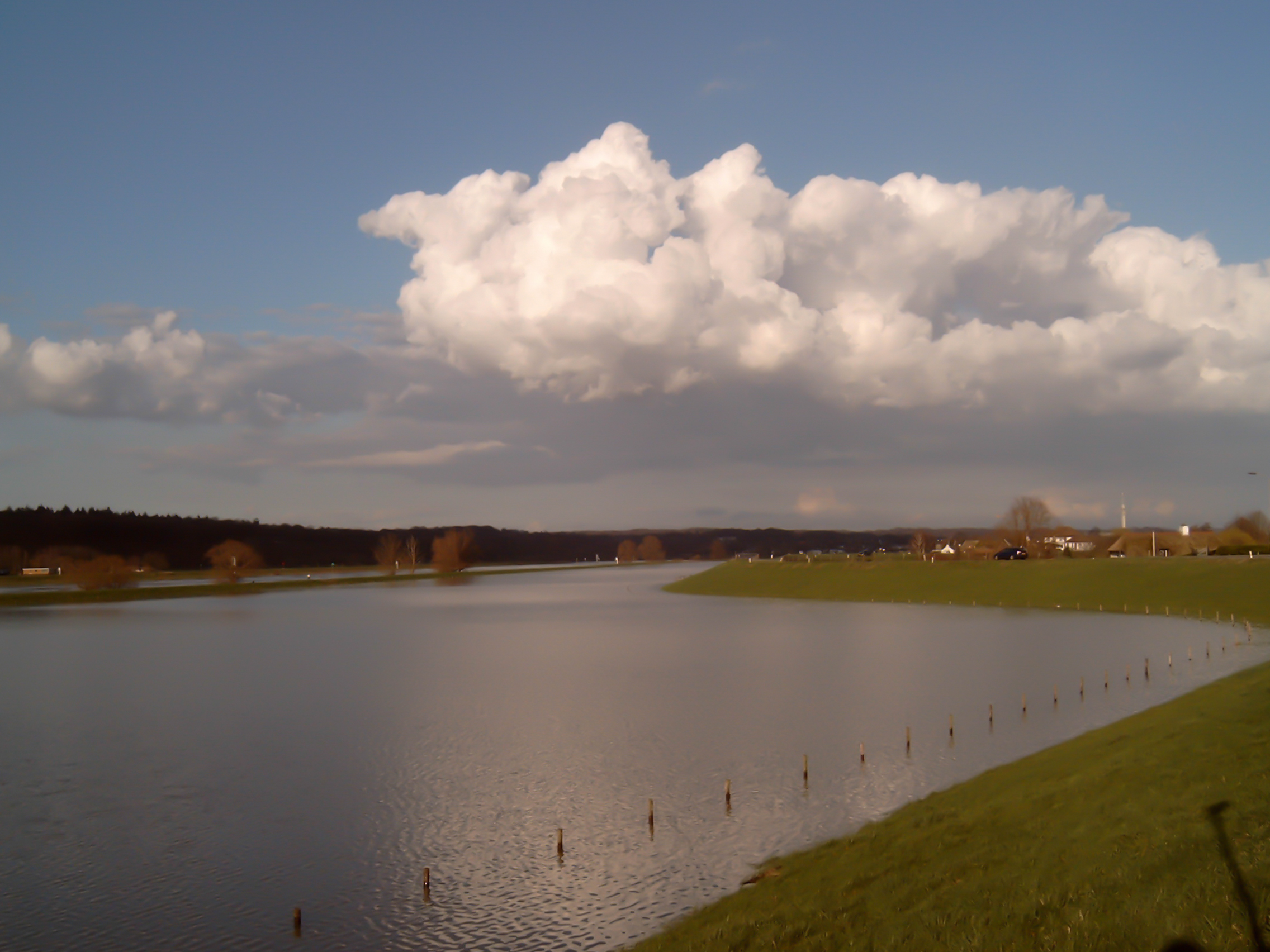
Driel, river Rhine

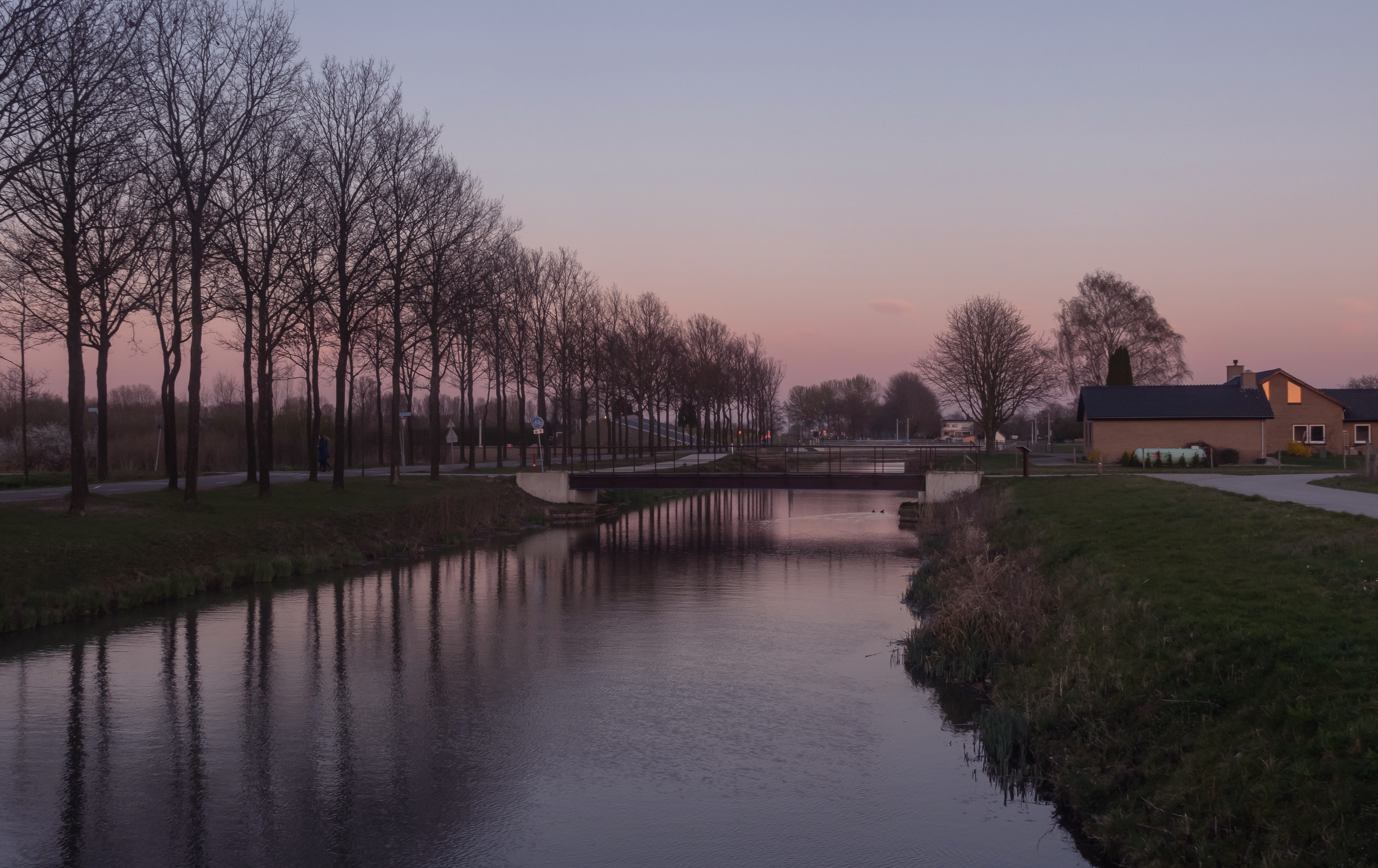
Near Elst, river Linge

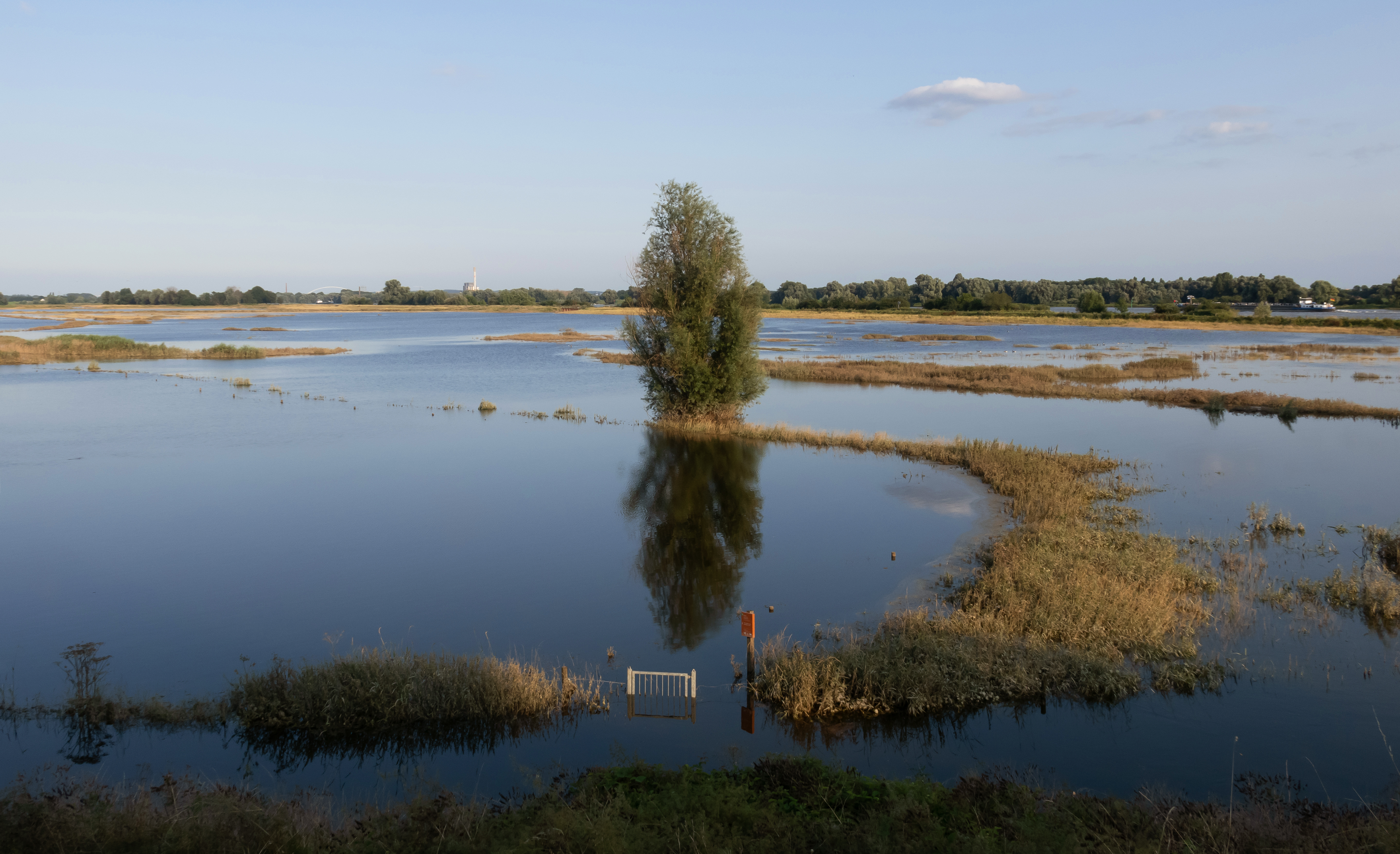
Near Slijk-Ewijk, the Waal during flood (summer 2021)

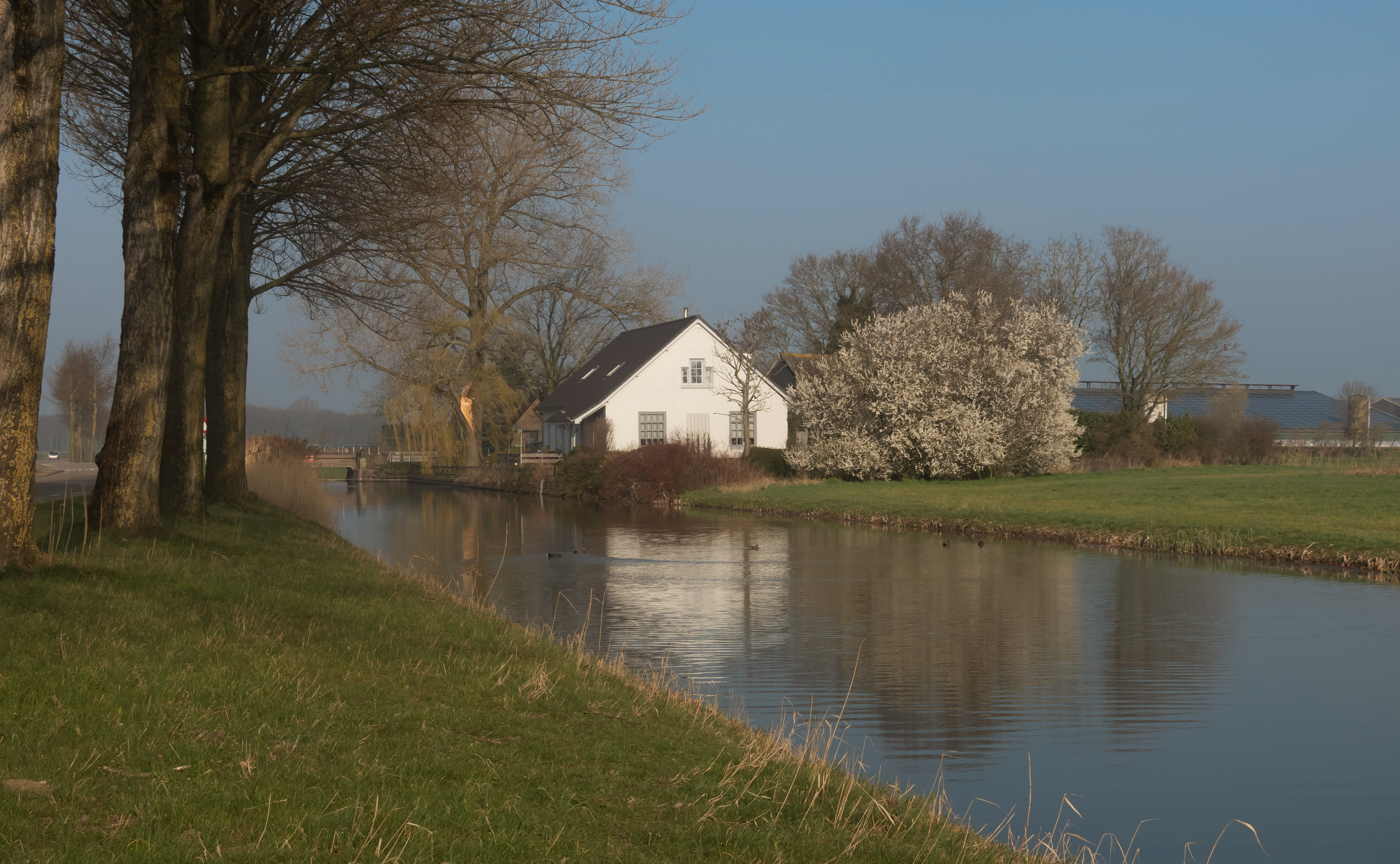
Heteren, farmhouse along the Linge

== Notable people ==
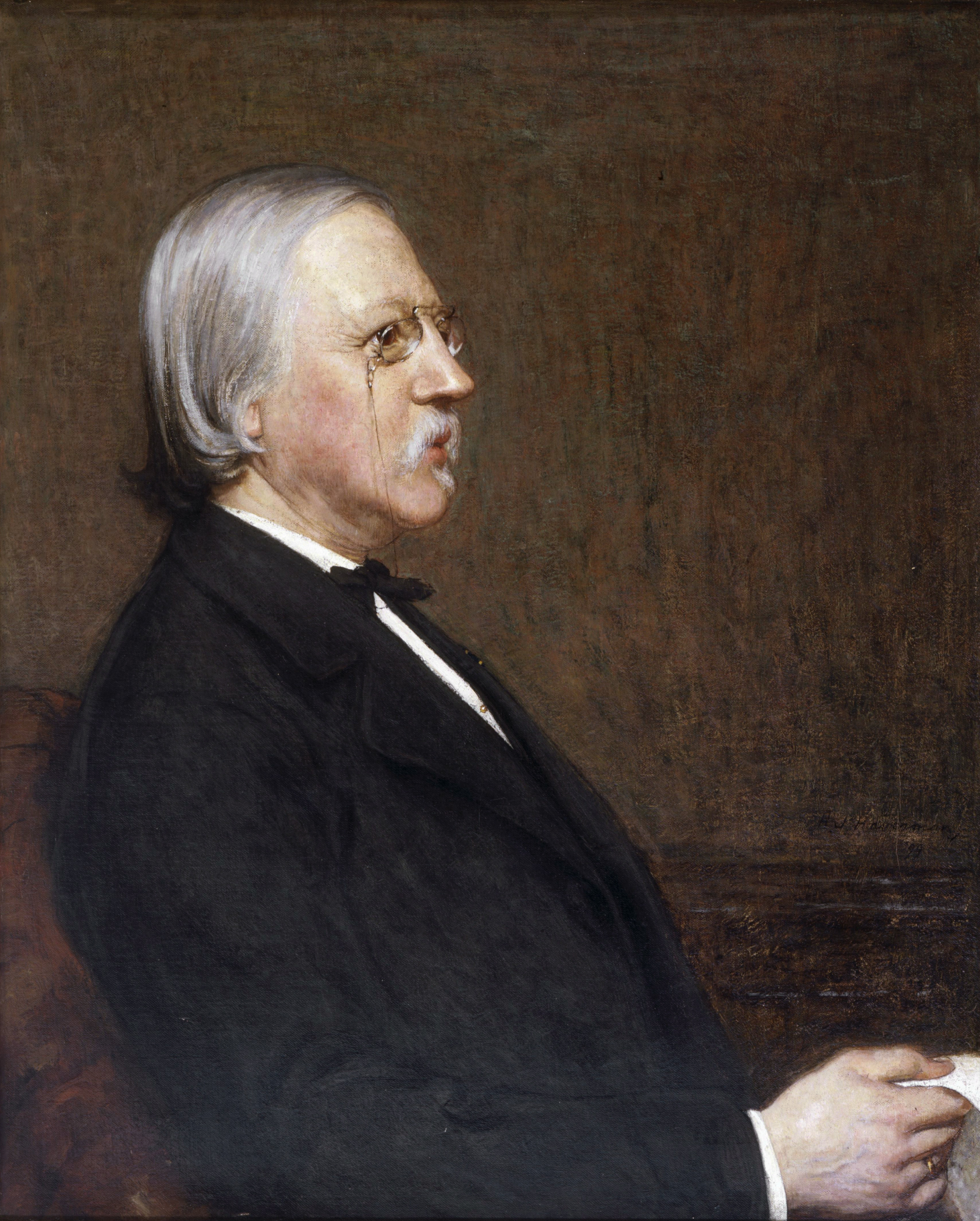
H.P.G. Quack, 1899

- Johan Derksen (born 1949 in Heteren) sports journalist and former football player
- Pierre Kartner (1935 in Elst – 2022) musician, singer-songwriter and record producer
- Frits Kuipers (1899 in Lent – 1943) footballer and bronze medallist at the 1920 Summer Olympics
- Paul Kuypers (1939 in Elst – 1971) agriculture expert in Ierapetra, Crete
- Loiza Lamers (born 1995 in Driel) transgender model
- Jeffrey Leiwakabessy (born 1981 in Elst) former professional footballer with 403 club caps
- Hendrick Peter Godfried Quack (1834 in Zetten – 1917) legal scholar, economist and historian
- Pieter Rijke (1812 in Hemmen – 1899) physicist, invented the Rijke tube
- Jan Zwartkruis (1926 in Elst – 2013) manager of the Netherlands national football team 1976/77 & 1978/81
