= Geertruida =

Geertruida is a Dutch feminine given name cognate to English Gertrude. It was a common name, but its use has declined steadily since about 1950. Bearers often used short forms in daily life, like Geertrui, Geer, Geerie, Geertje, Troy, Troie, Trudy, Trudie, Trui, Truid, and Truus. People with the name include:

- Geertruida "Truus" Bauer (1945–1989), Dutch rower
- Geertruida "Truid" Blaisse-Terwindt (1917–2002), Dutch tennis player
- Geertruida Carelsen (1843–1938), Dutch author
- Geertruida Bosboom-Toussaint (1812–1866), Dutch novelist
- Geertruida de Haas-Lorentz (1885–1973), Dutch physicist
- Geertruida "Truida" Heil-Bonnet (1920–2014), Dutch gymnast
- Geertruida "Truus" Hennipman (born 1943), Dutch sprinter
- Geertruida "Truus" Klapwijk (1904–1991), Dutch freestyle swimmer
- Geertruida "Truus" Looijs (born 1946), Dutch swimmer
- Geertruida Middendorp (1911–2007), Dutch resistance member
- Geertruida "Trudy" Ruth (born 1950), Dutch sprinter
- Geertruida van Saksen (1033–1113), countess consort of Holland
- Geertruida Wijsmuller-Meijer (1896–1978), Dutch war hero and resistance fighter
- Gertruida van Veen (1602–1643), Flemish painter
- Geertruida Wijthoff (1859–1953), Dutch mathematician and teacher

== Male ==
- Geertruida Maria "Ruud" Geels (1948–2023), Dutch footballer

== Other names ==
- Geertruid Adriaansdochter (died 1573), Dutch farmer
- Geertruy Haeck, Dutch patrician woman
- Geertruydt Roghman (1625–1657), Dutch painter
- Gertruid Bolwater (died 1511), Dutch heroine

== See also ==
- 1267 Geertruida, a main-belt asteroid
- Geertruida Gerarda (1904 ship)
