= Hendrik Pierson =

Dutch minister

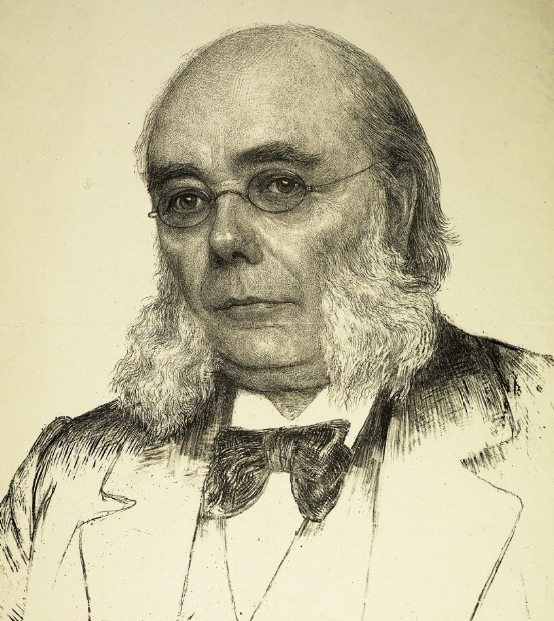
- Hendrik Pierson by Jan Pieter Veth (1896)
- Born: 10 July 1834; Amsterdam, Netherlands
- Died: 7 August 1923 (aged 89); Groningen, Netherlands
- Occupation: Pastor
- Known for: President of the Heldringstraat-asylum

Hendrik Pierson (10 July 1834 – 7 August 1923) was a Dutch Lutheran minister and member of the Réveil religious revival movement. He was president of the Ottho Gerhard Heldringstichting, an asylum for reformed prostitutes, from 1877 to 1914. He was one of the leaders of the campaign to abolish state regulation of prostitution, and in 1898 became president of the International Abolitionist Federation.

== Early years ==
Hendrik Pierson was born in Amsterdam on 10 July 1834, the fourth child of Jan Lodewijk Gregory Pierson (1806–1873) and Ida Oyens (1808–1860). He grew up in a genteel middle-class environment. He was influenced by the poetic piety of his mother and the prophetic spirit of Isaac da Costa. He studied theology in Utrecht, and in 1857 became a minister in Heinenoord, in South Holland. On 4 May 1857, he married Hermine Agnes Kolff (1833–1870). They would have six children. During the years that followed he was influenced by modernism, (Note: Jan Hendrik Scholten, a professor at Leiden, published The doctrine of the Dutch Reformed Church in 1848-50. This became the basis of the "modernism" movement. Modernists tried to reconcile Christian theology with modern science, and attacked the religion's traditional foundation in the supernatural. Some, such as Scholten, abandoned belief in the divinity of Christ and the Bible, although they continued to accept the Calvinist doctrines of predestination and the sovereignty of God. Pierson's congregation resisted modernist ideas. He wrote, "One was humbly content with few listeners for one weighed them and did not count them.") and later said he learned to descend into the depths of his own sinful heart. He considered resigning his office. However, by 1868 he had come to a deep and assured faith.

In 1869, Pierson moved to 's-Hertogenbosch, where he campaigned vigorously for Christian education. He was chairman of the School Council, and formed an advocacy group for Christian education at the national level. His first wife died in 1870. On 1 August 1872, he married Petronella Adriana Oyens (1834–1907). There were no children from this marriage, but his second wife acted as a beloved mother for his children from the first marriage.

== Zetten institutions ==
Prostitution was no longer listed as a criminal offense in the 1811 penal code of the Netherlands, and was allowed to take place in semi-regulated brothels. By 1851, when 36 towns introduced new brothel regulations, there were estimated to be about 1,000 active prostitutes in Amsterdam and 300–400 in Rotterdam and Utrecht. Ottho Gerhard Heldring (1804–1876) was the first social activist in the Netherlands to advocate providing care to prostitutes rather than punishing or repressing them. He established the first asylum for "fallen" women in Zetten, a village in Gelderland. In 1849 Heldring founded the "Steenbeek" asylum for prostitutes. Heldring was supported by the Amsterdam Réveil circle, which established the Association for the Encouragement of Penitent Fallen Women in 1846. The women and girls at the asylum stayed in an austere environment, were given basic education, read the Bible and sang. The board took responsibility for them after their release, trying to find them jobs as domestic servants with respectable families or in institutions. By 1870, 825 women and girls had passed through the asylum, which had inspired institutions on similar lines across the Netherlands and throughout Europe.

Hendrik Pierson succeeded Heldring. He accepted the appointment as president of the Heldringgestichten (Heldring Asylum) in Zetten in 1877. Here he found his vocation, putting great devotion and energy into helping vulnerable girls and women. In 1882 Pierson added the Magdalena House for unmarried mothers, and in 1888 the Children's Home. He also established the training schools Hosa Semna and Hosa Euphema for girls aged six to fourteen, who were expected to go on to train as teachers. As well as general management of the complex of schools in Zetten, he gave catechism, preached twice every Sunday, held literary evenings for the student teachers and storytelling evenings for the girls of the homes where he read stories while they knitted or sewed. He wrote books for the catechism, wrote poetry and became well known as a preacher. As minister of the Vluchtheuvelkerk in Zetten Pierson did not allow anything that could distract the congregation from his sermon. He wrote, "there was no collection, no one minding pews, no one assigning places. One did not have to pay ten cents for a seat."

== Abolitionist leader ==
Heldring had established his asylum to save women, but also testified about the evils of prostitution and tried to stir up public opinion against it. Pierson took up this struggle. The first congress of what would become the International Abolitionist Federation (IAF) was held in Geneva in 1877. Pierson's future son-in-law, Willem van den Bergh, had done research at Steenbeek for a dissertation on prostitution and had been invited to the congress by Aimé Hubert. He invited Pierson and his wife to come with him. (Note: Willem Van de Bergh married Pierson's daughter Ida in 1879. After giving birth to two children she died of tuberculosis in 1884, aged twenty-five. Van den Bergh died of the same disease in 1890.) There Pierson was inspired by the Englishwoman Josephine Butler (1828–1906) who led the European movement to resist government-regulated prostitution, which Butler and her followers saw as state-sanctioned fornication. Pierson was greatly impressed by Butler's speech where she discussed the God-given right of a woman to have control over her body. He was persuaded to join the IAF despite his misgivings about the secular nature of the organization and the influence of socialist feminists. Pierson gave Butler a link to Dutch abolitionists.

Pierson threw his energy into this cause, a struggle for the dignity of women. In 1877 Pierson published a translation of Butler's Une Voix dans le Désert (A Voice in the Desert), an account of a tour of Europe she had made a few years earlier to visit sympathizers of the abolitionist cause. He edited the monthly Getuigen en Redden (Testify and Save), established in 1878. In 1879 the Nederlandsche Vereeniging tegen de Prostitutie (NVP: Dutch Association against Prostitution) was founded. Pierson was chairman until 1909. The NVP became the main vehicle for the Protestant moral offensive. At the same time, registered prostitutes began to be inspected more often due to growing concern about venereal diseases. Pierson spoke at the annual conferences of the IAF in Belgium in 1879 and London in 1881. He impressed his audience with his opposition to legislation that treated prostitutes as "pariahs", and showed a strong belief in one moral standard for both rich and poor, men and women. He took a central role in organizing the third IAF congress, which was held at The Hague in the Netherlands in 1883. Pierson called on his fellow-members of the Réveil movement to help with this congress. Pierson became president of the IAF in 1898.

Pierson carefully studied the scientific literature on prostitution and official, legal and medical arguments for or against regulations. He wrote against state-regulated prostitution and spoke at many public debates. He explained that enforced regulations were counter to the law, hygiene and morality. Against the law because the woman lost her liberty, against hygiene because it fostered a false sense of security and against morality because it encouraged adultery. He spoke against the double standard in which the man was innocent but the woman guilty, and said that there was only one moral law for both men and women. In his pamphlet Legalized Vice and his articles in Testify and Save he wrote that regulated prostitution was adultery made legitimate by the state. Pierson rejected the widespread belief that prostitution was required as an outlet for the male sex drive. Men should be expected to live as virtuously as their wives. Eventually there was a shift in public opinion, and in 1911 the regulations were abolished and brothels were banned. Pierson was also involved in the creation of the Children's Law (1905) which gave courts the right to relieve parents of their rights and transfer custody to orphanages.

Hendrik Pierson left Zetten in 1914 in poor health. Little is known of his last years. He died on 7 August 1923 in Groningen.

== Works ==
Selected works included:

- De heerschappij der bourgeoisie in de Nederlandsch Hervormde Kerk (The domination of the bourgeoisie in the Dutch Reformed Church) in: De Gids 33 (1869), 441-477
- Aan de moderne predikanten in de Ned. Herv. Kerk (Modern pastors in the Dutch Reformed Church) ’s-Hertogenbosch 1876
- Het Maandblad Getuigen (The Monthly Witnesses) in Redden 1-33 (1878-1911)
- Gewettigde ontucht (Legalized Vice), Arnhem 1878
- De Bode der Heldring-Gestichten (The Herald of the Heldring Asylums) 1-31 (1884-1914)

== Sources ==
- Bank, Jan; Buuren, Maarten van (2004). Dutch Culture in a European Perspective: 1900, the age of bourgeois culture. Uitgeverij Van Gorcum. ISBN 978-90-232-3965-9.
- Bos, David (2010). Servants of the Kingdom: Professionalization Among Ministers of the Nineteenth-century Netherlands Reformed Church. BRILL. ISBN 978-90-04-18392-6.
- Boutellier, Hans (2002-09-30). Crime and Morality, the Significance of Criminal Justice in Post-Modern Culture. Springer Science & Business Media. ISBN 978-90-411-1955-1.
- Broeyer, F.G.M (2003-07-30). "Theological Education at the Dutch Universities". The Pastor Bonus: Papers Read at the British-Dutch Colloquium at Utrecht, 18-21 September 2002. BRILL. ISBN 90-04-13173-6.
- Brock, Brian; Swinton, John (2012). Disability in the Christian Tradition: A Reader. Wm. B. Eerdmans Publishing. ISBN 978-0-8028-6602-8.
- Daggers, Jenny; Neal, Diana; Butler, Josephine Elizabeth Grey (2006-01-01). Sex, Gender, and Religion: Josephine Butler Revisited. Peter Lang. ISBN 978-0-8204-8117-3.
- Davidson, Roger; Hall, Lesley A. (2003-09-02). Sex, Sin and Suffering: Venereal Disease and European Society since 1870. Routledge. ISBN 978-1-134-56647-1.
- Dubois, O.W. (2007). "Hendrik Pierson". Biografisch Woordenboek Gelderland, deel 6, Bekende en onbekende mannen en vrouwen uit de Gelderse geschiedenis (in Dutch). Verloren.
- Limoncelli, Stephanie (2010-02-23). The Politics of Trafficking: The First International Movement to Combat the Sexual Exploitation of Women. Stanford University Press. ISBN 978-0-8047-6294-6.
- Wintle, Michael (2000-09-21). An Economic and Social History of the Netherlands, 1800–1920: Demographic, Economic and Social Transition. Cambridge University Press. ISBN 978-1-139-42856-9.
- Wood, John Halsey (2013-04-11). Going Dutch in the Modern Age: Abraham Kuyper's Struggle for a Free Church in the Netherlands. Oxford University Press. ISBN 978-0-19-992038-9.
