= Ottho Gerhard Heldring =

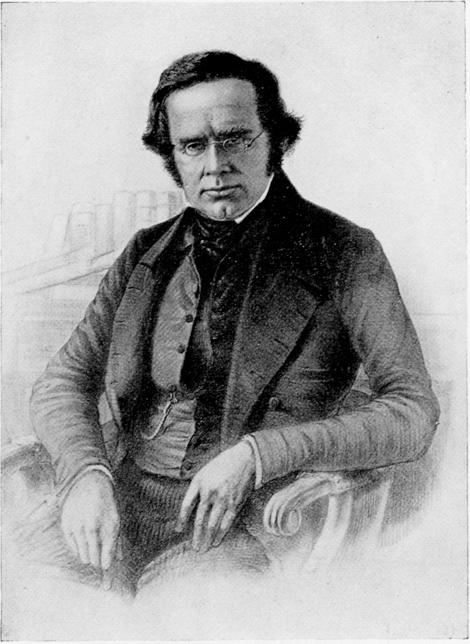
- Ottho Gerhard Heldring c. 1848
- Born: 17 May 1804; Zevenaar, Netherlands
- Died: 11 July 1876 (aged 72); Marienbad, Bohemia
- Occupation: Preacher

Ottho Gerhard Heldring (17 May 1804 – 11 July 1876) was a Dutch preacher and philanthropist who believed in justification through faith but also in social work. He was one of the early leaders of the Dutch temperance movement. He is known for establishing homes and schools for prostitutes wishing to start a new life and for vulnerable girls and young women.

== Early years ==
Ottho Gerhard Heldring was born on 17 May 1804 at Zevenaar, the third son of Reverend Ottho Gerhard Heldring (1762–1841) and Louisa Geertruida Janssen (1764–1840). Heldring grew up in a pietist family environment. He went to Utrecht to study theology when he was sixteen, but was deeply disturbed by the humanistic and rationalistic theology he was exposed to there, and abandoned his studies after a spiritual crisis. He worked on the land for a period, then at his father's request became a pastor. He was admitted to this profession by the Hemmen municipality and confirmed on 25 March 1827. He would remain in this position for the rest of his life. At Christmas 1827 he experienced an inner revelation. He fully surrendered to Christ, and at the same time devoted himself to helping the poor.

On 24 October 1833 Heldring married Anna Elisabeth Deuffer Wiel (1807–73). They would have eight children. In 1833 he published a book on Nature and Man, and in 1835 published Winter Evening Readings of Pastor Gerhard, which discussed poor relief. As editor of Geldersche Volksalmanak (Arnhem 1835–1847) he showed his love for the archaeology and history of Gelderland. He acquired a reputation in literary circles for his simple and natural writing, with its expression of sympathy, contentment and piety. In the 1830s and 1840s Heldring pioneered the national fight against gin, which he considered more harmful than cholera. In 1838 he published an influential book that made a convincing case through statistics for the devastating effects of gin and suggested measures to fight it.

== Social work ==
Locations in the Netherlands

In the late 1830s Heldring began to speak publicly about justification of Christianity through faith. He appreciated the philanthropy of enlightened Christian associations such as Maatschappij tot Nut van 't Algemeen (the Society for General Public welfare), but saw excessive focus on good works as a denial of Christianity. On the other hand, he criticized orthodox believers who lacked any form of Christ-inspired social labor. He envisioned a form of orthodox Christianity that understood the requirement for social work. This led him to join and become a leader of the Réveil movement. From 1845–54 the Christelijke Vrienden (Christian Friends), inspired by what De Graaf has called an "orthodoxy of the heart", undertook an impressive program of social and church activities in which Heldring played a central role.

Heldring had a well dug at the hamlet of Hoenderloo in 1843 and established a school there in 1846, a home for neglected boys in 1851 and a church in 1858. In 1845–46 Heldring worked hard to relieve the desperate conditions created by the potato blight through publicizing the problem and raising donations. In the late 1840s he helped with the migration of poor families from Betuwe to the newly reclaimed Anna Paulownapolder. He also helped promote Protestant Christianity in the Dutch East Indies, and was the driving force behind creation of the Algemeen Christelijk Nationaal Zendingsfeest missionary society.

Heldring was the first social activist in the Netherlands to advocate providing care to prostitutes rather than punishing or repressing them. He established the first asylum for "fallen" women in Zetten, a village in his parish. The "Steenbeek" asylum (Note: The "Steenbeek" asylum is now the Ottho Gerhard Heldringstichting) opened in 1849 as a home for prostitutes who wanted to start a new life. Heldring was supported by the Amsterdam Réveil circle, which established the Association for the Encouragement of Penitent Fallen Women in 1846. The women and girls at the asylum stayed in an austere environment, were given basic education, read the Bible and sang. The board took responsibility for them after their release, trying to find them jobs as domestic servants with respectable families or in institutions.

By 1870, 825 women and girls had passed through the asylum, which had inspired institutions on similar lines across the Netherlands and throughout Europe. Heldring also founded Talitha Kumi in 1857 for neglected girls aged twelve to sixteen, Bethel in 1863 for girls from sixteen to twenty, a Christian normal school in 1864 and the Vluchtheuvel Church in 1870. The church was built on an artificial hill and had an attic that could be used as a refuge during the floods that periodically ravaged Betuwe at that time.

Heldring died on 11 July 1876 in Marienbad aged 72. Hendrik Pierson succeeded Heldring in Zetten.

== Publications ==
- De Natuur en de Mensch of levensbeschouwingen van pachter Gerhard op zijne wandelingen met neef Jonas, Amsterdam 1834
- Winteravond-lektuur van pachter Gerhard, Amsterdam 1835–36
- Wandelingen ter opsporing van Bataafsche en Romeinsche oudheden, legenden, enz., Amsterdam 1838–48
- De nimmer rustende Israeliet tot rust gekomen. Eene christelijke legende, Amsterdam 1839
- De zoon der natuur en de man naar de wereld, 2 volumes, 1839
- Hoe Simon Bar Jona aan de hand van Jezus, Petrus geworden is, Leiden 1842
- De bijbel en de mensch, Amsterdam 1842–44
- Binnen- en buitenlandsche kolonisatie, in betrekking tot de armoede, Amsterdam 1846
- Opmerkingen op een reis langs den Rijn, Amsterdam 1847
- Is er slavernij in Nederland?, brochure aimed at the regulation of prostitution, 1847
- Reis naar Hamburg en Berlijn of eenige dagen toegewijd aan het gebied der innere Mission, Amsterdam 1850
- Leven en arbeid (published posthumously by his son in 1881; composed of diary and loose memories)

== Sources ==
- Daggers, Jenny; Neal, Diana; Butler, Josephine Elizabeth Grey (2006-01-01). Sex, Gender, and Religion: Josephine Butler Revisited. Peter Lang. ISBN 978-0-8204-8117-3.
- Dubois, O.W. (2002). "Ottho Gerhard Heldring". Biografisch Woordenboek Gelderland (in Dutch). Vol. 3. Verloren Hilversum.
