= Siege of Alkmaar =

1573 battle of the Eighty Years' War

Coordinates: 52.63°N 4.75°E

- Part of the Eighty Years' War
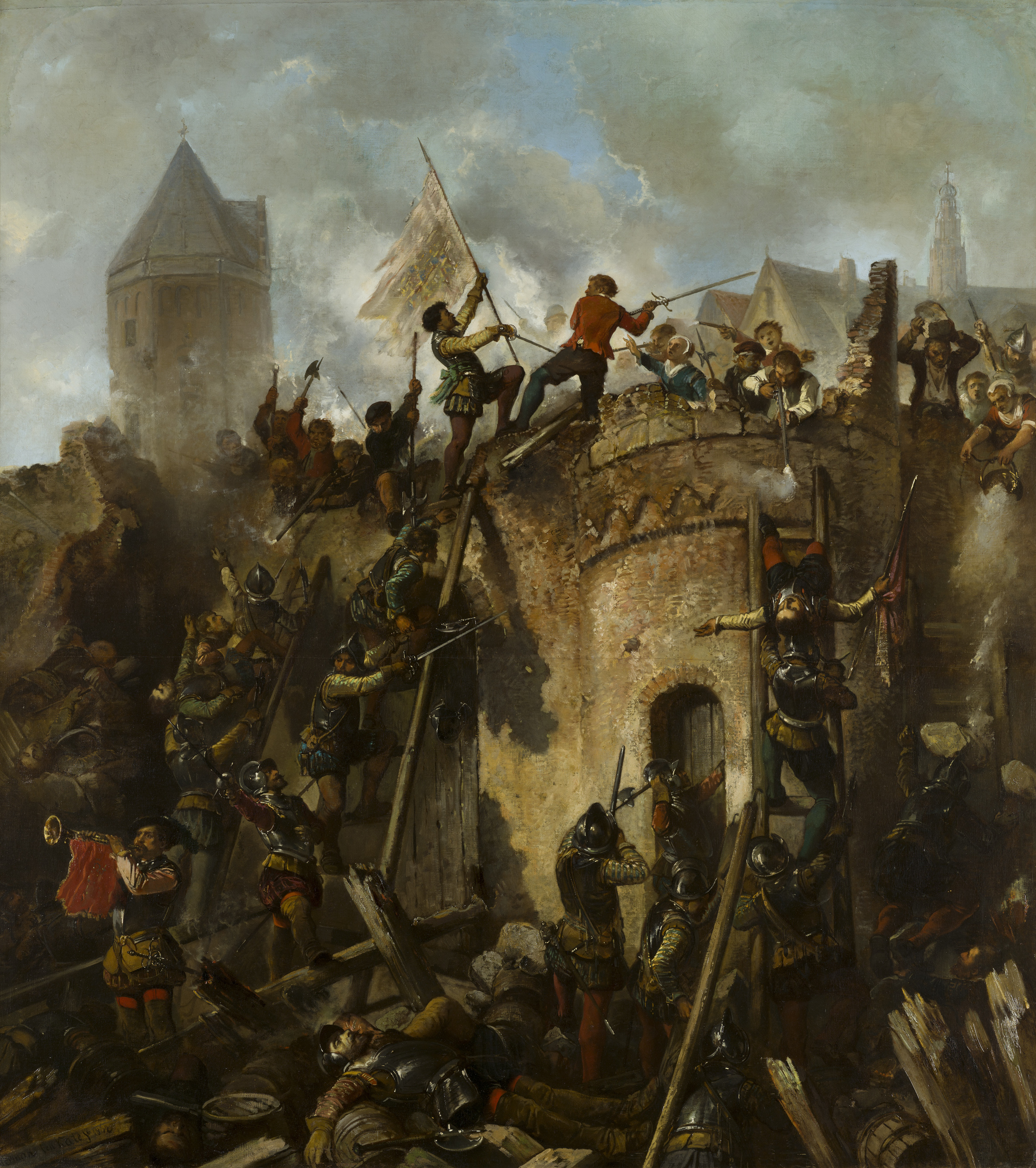
- Spanish troops storming the walls of Alkmaar, by Herman Frederik Carel ten Kate
Date	21 August – 8 October 1573
Location	Alkmaar (present-day Holland)
Result	Dutch victory

Belligerents
Dutch rebels	Spain

Commanders and leaders
Jacob Cabeliau	(Spain) Fadrique Álvarez de Toledo (Spain) Philip of Noircarmes (DOW)

Strength
2,000 (Geuzen and Civilians): Scots Brigade	16,000 troops (estimated)

Casualties and losses
24+ geuzen, 13 civilians	Over 500

The siege of Alkmaar (1573) was a turning point in the Eighty Years' War.

The burghers of the Dutch city of Alkmaar held off the Spanish (who had set up their camp in Oudorp) between 21 August and 8 October 1573, with boiling tar and burning branches from their renewed city walls. On 23 September William the Silent followed up on a request by Cabeliau dating from the beginning of the siege and ordered the dikes surrounding Alkmaar to be breached, thereby flooding the polders in which the Spanish troops were camped, like the Achtermeer polder. This forced the Spanish commander, Don Fadrique, the son of the hated Alba himself, to retreat and the last Spanish soldiers left on 8 October 1573.

The end of the siege is considered a turning point in the Eighty Years' War as Alkmaar was the first city to overcome a siege by the Spanish army.

The garrison included a detachment of Scots soldiers who had previously tried to defend Haarlem.

A first-hand account of the siege exists in the diary of Nanning van Foreest, a local city councillor. Several archaeological examinations have uncovered remains of the battle.

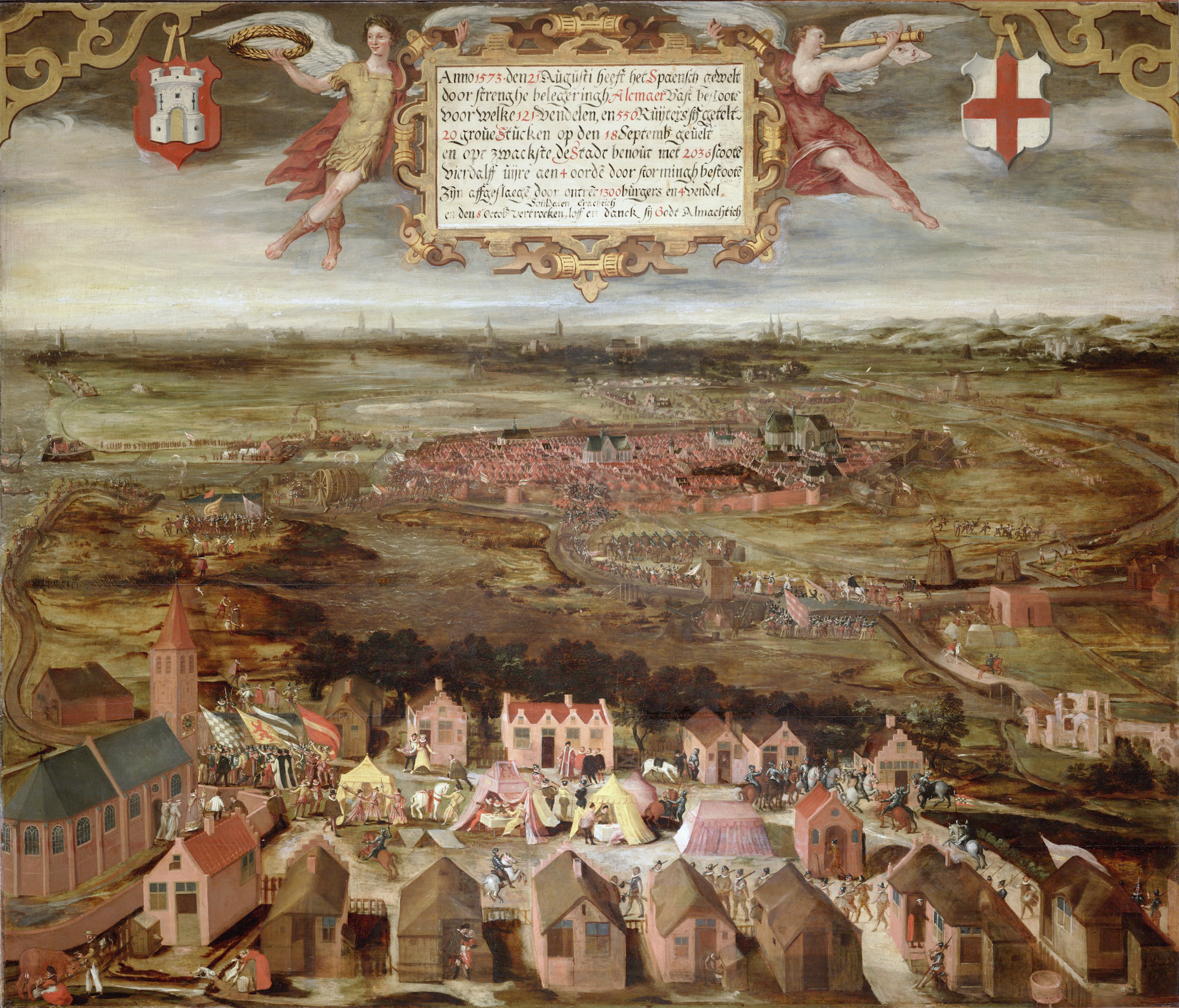
A painting showing unfinished fortifications

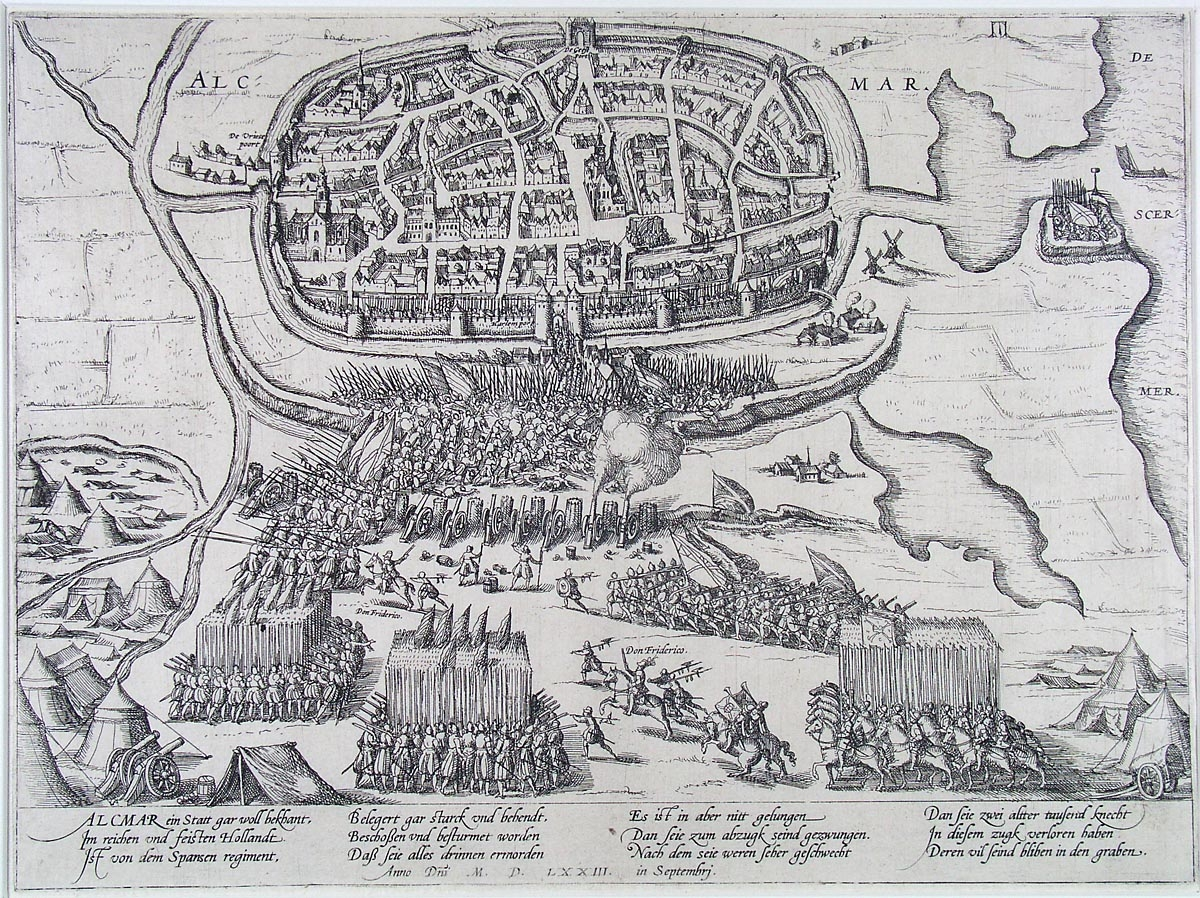
The siege of Alkmaar by Frans Hogenberg.
