= Truus =

Truus is a Dutch feminine given name, often a shortened hypocorism of fuller names such as Geertruida or Theresa. Notable people with the name include:

- Truus van Aalten (1910–1999), Dutch actress
- Truus Bauer (1945–1989), Dutch rower
- Truus Baumeister (1907–2000) Dutch swimmer
- Truus Hennipman, (born 1943), Dutch sprinter
- Truus Kerkmeester (1921–1990), Dutch swimmer
- Truus Klapwijk (1904–1991), Dutch diver and swimmer
- Truus Looijs (born 1946), Dutch swimmer
- Truus Menger-Oversteegen (1923–2016), member of the Dutch resistance during World War II, sculptor and painter
- Truus van der Plaat, Dutch track and road cyclist
- Truus Schröder-Schräder (1889–1985), Dutch socialite and trained pharmacist
- Geertruida Wijsmuller-Meijer (1896–1978) (Truus Wijsmuller-Meijer) Dutch war hero, resistance fighter
