= Haeck =

Haeck is a surname. Notable people with the surname include:

- Christel Haeck (born 1948), Canadian politician
- Geertruy Haeck, 15th-century Dutch patrician woman

== See also ==
- Heck (surname)
