= Achtermeer =

Historic Polder in Alkmaar, North Holland, Netherlands

Coordinates: 52°37′27″N 4°44′49″E

The Achtermeer polder, south of Alkmaar in the Dutch province of North Holland, is the first known polder in the Netherlands.

== History ==
In 1532, Emperor Charles V granted the permit to drain the forty-hectare lake. The draining was completed in 1533.

In 1573 the polder was flooded again for a short period. Partly because of that, the Spaniards, who had their camp there, had to give up the Siege of Alkmaar. This was an early victory for the Dutch in the Eighty Years' War.

From 1709 the mill of the Achtermeer also kept the Overdie polder dry. Together with the Klappolder, which was added a few years later, the Water Board of the Overdie and Achtermeer polders took its definitive form. The Water Board was abolished in 1962. The area is now managed by the Hoogheemraadschap Hollands Noorderkwartier. This water board manages the original 352 water boards still existing in 1931.

After the Second World War, a residential area was built in the polder, so it is now entirely within the built-up area of Alkmaar. When planning this new neighbourhood, the subdivision and the polder ditches were the starting point for the street pattern. Parts of the ring canal have been preserved.

The mill burned down in 1912. From 1913 to 1988, the Alkmaar Diesel pumping station maintained the water level in the Overdie and Achtermeer polders. Since 1994, that pumping station has been a Provincial Monument; it still functions in times of exceptionally high water. (The black arrow in the recent map indicates the location of the pumping station.)

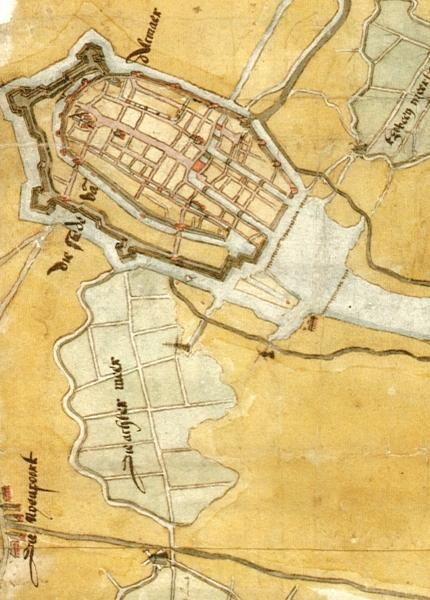
South of the city of Alkmaar is the Achtermeer polder, drained in 1533.

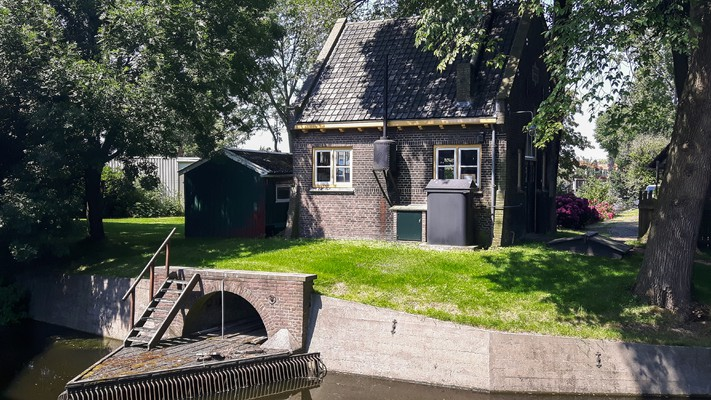
The Diesel pumping station of the "Het Overdie en Achtermeer" polder has been a designated Provincial Monument since 1996. In 2011 the Foundation Diesel Pumping Station "J.J. Schilstra" has transferred the station to the Housing Corporation "Van Alckmaer".

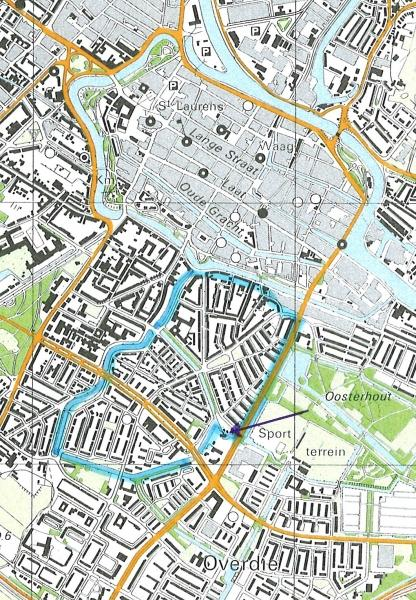
The Achtermeerpolder (circled in blue) now lies within the city limits of Alkmaar. The black arrow indicates the location of the pumping station.
