= Geertruida Carelsen =

Dutch author and journalist

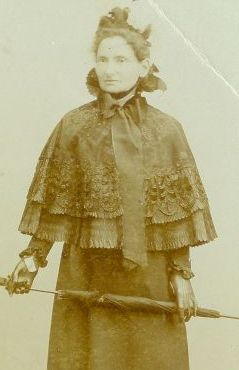
- ca. 1899
- Born: Amy Geertruida de Leeuw; 10 April 1843; Haarlem, Netherlands
- Died: 4 June 1938; Haarlem, Netherlands
- Occupation(s): Author journalist
- Spouse: none
- Parent(s): Johan Carel de Leeuw (1816–1880); Maria Cornelia Elisabeth Penninck Hoofd (1815/1816–1876)

Amy Geertruida de Leeuw (10 April 1843 – 4 June 1938), known by the pen name Geertruida Carelsen, was a Dutch author and journalist.

== Life and works ==
=== Provenance and early years ===
Amy Geertruida de Leeuw was born at the family home alongside the Nieuwe Gracht in Haarlem, the oldest of her parents' four children. Her mother was Maria Cornelia Elisabeth Penninck Hoofd (1815/1816–1876), half-niece (following the re-marriage of Geertruida's widowed grandmother) of the landscape architect Louis Paul Zocher, and a professional translator of English provenance. Johan Carel de Leeuw (1816–1880), her father, was a water engineer who was in charge of the draining of the Anna Paulownapolder north of Alkmaar. In 1848 the company that had been set up to drain the Anna Paulownapolder filed for bankruptcy and her father lost a large part of his savings and the handsome salary which he had hitherto earned. The family's circumstances were suddenly much diminished, and a sense of shock formed the background for this part of Geertruida's childhood. In 1855 her father accepted a job as a "Dijkgraaf", becoming a senior administrative official with a water company. This meant relocating to the newly available drained lands of the Anna Paulownapolder. It was no longer possible for Amy Geertruida, by now aged 12, to attend the school in Haarlem where she had received her early education. Instead she and her younger sister Albertina Carolina were educated by her mother in the evenings. Their two brothers were sent away to boarding school for their educations. Thanks to her mother's English background, Amy Geertruida de Leeuw was able to master the English language relatively young.

She herself would remain unmarried.

As a child, de Leeuw developed a passion for gardening which would never leave her. This was encouraged by her step-grandfather (her grandmother's second husband), the landscape architect who lived nearby and gave her access to a piece of land where she could create and develop a little garden of her own. After the family relocated, in 1855, she frequently accompanied her father on the walks he took in the course of his work, to inspect the conditions of dikes that drained and protected the Anna Paulownapolder. As a teenager she also came increasingly to help her father with his work back in the house, organising his work-diary and handling some of his office correspondence.

=== Writer ===
When she was 20, de Leeuw decided to become a writer, "not because I particularly wanted to [write]. But because I had stuff to say". (Note: "... niet omdat ik dat zo graag wou worden. Maar omdat ik iets te zeggen had.") Along with Henriëtte van der Meij, de Leeuw came from the first generation of women few of whom turned to journalism as a way to earn a living: she was acutely aware of being a woman in a man's world. Initially her contributions appeared simply under the by-line, "from a country girl" ("... een landmeisje"), but she was told she should use a name, so chose the pseudonym George Zeemeeuw. This generated with objections that a woman should not be writing under a name that implied she was a man. Following discussion of the matter with her father she switched to writing under the name Geertruida Carelsen. "Geertruida" was already her second real name, which she had been given because it was the second name of her paternal grandmother: the name "Carel" was her father's second name.

She began in 1863, writing letters reflecting on nature, with the intention of bringing a greater knowledge of nature to "city girls". In 1874 these letters were bundled into a single compilation and published under the title "In 't vrije veld. Brieven van een Landmeisje aan jonge dames" (loosely, "In the open field. Letters from a country girl to young ladies"). She celebrated the birth of Princess Wilhelmina in 1880 with a poem "On the birth of a princess", which was published in the Nieuws van den Dag, an Amsterdam-based mass circulation daily newspaper. Over the next twenty years she followed this up with a number of further novellas, poems and short "impressions" that were published in various newspapers and magazines. She became a regular contributor to the Nieuws van den Dag in 1881 when the paper published the first in her series of ten lengthy, readable and scholarly pieces on "botanical city walks", in which she demonstrated literary talent and a botanical knowledge that was both broad and deep, evidently acquired from her mother's kinsman, the landscape architect Louis Paul Zocher. It was as a journalist - a female journalist - that she would later become more widely known.

=== Nurse ===
Carelsen's mother died in 1876 and her father in 1880. Her siblings had already left home, and finding herself, for the first time, alone, she took work in an Amsterdam hospital as a trainee nurse. There was no preliminary requirement to study for any sort of diploma, but she evidently brought commitment and energy to her hospital training and duties, possibly supported by the experience gained looking after her own parents during their final years.

=== London ===
She worked at the hospital till 1888, which was when "family circumstances" called her to London where for not quite three years, she lived with maternal-side relatives. Her English kinsfolk appear to have moved in politically left-wing circles: life in London made a deep impression on her still youthfully receptive soul. She was struck by the way that in England great affluence and gut-wrenching poverty could be found side by side. Great industry brought both great benefits and great destruction. She was no doubt influenced by the intensely spiritual and deeply intellectual circles into which, through her cousins' network, she was welcomed. She found she was forced to think deeply: looking back, she would later recall that it was mainly during her time in England that she learned to be a journalist.

She attended numerous stage performances in the English capital, as well as signing up for various courses and attending lectures. In 1890, shortly before returning from London, she published a travel guide to the city.

=== Journalist ===
By the time she left London she was in regular contact with a number of important Dutch newspapers. It was the Nieuws van den Dag and the Utrechts Dagblad which sent her to Berlin at the end of 1890 to work as their correspondent there. One of the first pieces of written work that she produced after arriving in Berlin was a travel guide to the city, which was published in 1891. She would spend seventeen years in Berlin, and to judge by the proportion of her memoires devoted to those years, Carelsen regarded her time in Berlin as by far the most important part of her professional career. J. P. Thijsse would later write that Carelsen was one of the best Dutch journalists, irrespective of gender. in 1893 she accepted membership of the Leiden-based Dutch Literary Society ("Maatschappij der Nederlandse Letterkunde"/ MNL) which had, up till this point, been an all-male association.

=== Final years ===
Increasingly troubled by blindness, Geertruida Carelsen lived out her final fourteen years in Haarlem, the city of her birth. Her public profile was by now diminished, but she continued to write for a number of magazines until well into her old age. Her themes were frequently horticultural or otherwise concerned with nature. She was also over many years a persistent advocate of improved vocation training for women, and promoted the need to open horticultural schools for girls. She also continued to attend meetings of the Dutch Literary Society. She devoted much of her time to tending and developing her garden. She published her memoires in 1928, and then a second volume of memoires which appeared in 1933. She wrote of it in 1932 in a letter to her friend, the playwright-businessman Frans Mijnssen, "It may well be my final book, but my soul is in it 100%". (Note: "Het zal wel het laatste boek zijn, dat ik uitgeef, maar mijn ziel ligt er helemaal in".).

The writer A. G. de Leeuw, better known under her pen-name as Geertruida Carelsen, died aged 95 at Haarlem on 4 June 1938.

== Output (selection) ==
- In 't vrije veld. Brieven van een landmeisje aan jongedames. Amsterdam, 1866.
- 'Bloemen en tuinen', in: Volks-almanak van de Maatschappij tot Nut van 't Algemeen (1879), pp. 42–49.
- Natuurfantazieën. Haarlem, 1881.
- Een bonte bundel. Haarlem, [1882].
- 'In het park te Muskau', in: De Gids 50 (1886), pp. 259–285.
- Vertellingen en schetsen. Haarlem, 1886.
- In Londen. Haarlem, [1890].
- Berlijn. Amsterdam, 1891.
- Eerbied voor het levend materiaal in de tuinkunst. Haarlem, 1902.
- Noord-Hollandsche vertellingen. Rotterdam, [1903].
- 'Het werk der Zochers', in: De Tijdspiegel 74 (1917), pp. 205–220.
- Herinneringen (Memoires). Haarlem, 1928.
- Herinneringen. Tweede bundel (Memoires, second volume). Haarlem, 1933.
- Vertellingen en scehtsen. Haarlem, [z.j.].

A more detailed version of this listing has been placed online by the Digitale Bibliotheek voor de Nederlandse Letteren (DBNL).
