= Ottho Gerhard Heldringstichting =

Ottho Gerhard Heldringstichting (Dutch: Ottho Gerhard Heldring Foundation) is a Dutch orthopaedic institution in Zetten, Netherlands. The facility is a private (non-governmental) managed centre for youth with severe behaviour and often also psychiatric problems. The facility caters for youth from 12 – 18 years old (sometime max 24 at end of stay, normal intelligent and without very serious addiction problems. Youth living at the facility are sent via the (juvenile) court when the judge decides that juvenile needs treatment (for behaviour problems) in a closed setting.

== History ==
The facility is named after Ottho Gerhard Heldring, in his time a famous Dutchman. As author and pastor he worried about and cared for the less fortunate and people with problems. In 1848 he founded the first society offering a place to young women who were pregnant against their will. The children of these women were raised by his society and received education. Also youngsters that couldn't survive in society because of their behavior could find shelter and help as well.
Education has always been important for Heldring. Each child received the education he/she needed, from primary school, grammar school to vocational education, depending one age, capabilities and need. Since the 1960s all education is done via school De Brouwerij (Dutch for "The Brewery"). The current buildings in use by the OGH were erected during the 1990s

== Target group ==
Short-term treatment in a closed and secured environment of longer treatment in a protected and less secured setting are both available. On the closed/high security treatment unit the capacity is eleven girls. On the protected semi-secured treatment there is a total capacity of 140 youth: male, female and mixed. All residents are placed via the (juvenile) court, but not all residents are sent for (specific) criminal behavior, but in all cases the judge orders stay and treatment for the children's problematic behavior

== Treatment ==
Most residents at OGH have a long history of problems, often including a problematic home environment. Youth are sent to OGH if they need a closed off protected environment for treatment. Residents refusing help might receive forced treatment.

=== Programme ===
Residents are as much as possible divided in age-groups and receive treatment based on their individual needs. A list of methods or forms available:

- based on individual treatment- and end-result goals.
- training for parents or caretakers
- how to manage anxiety and anger-management
- learning social skills
- sessions with psychologist and/or psychiatrist
- learn social skills
- join activities, both alone and group-activities
- learn how to learn at school (most residents left school or had stopped really learning something at school)

For some arrivals a start in the closed setting is required, others can start in the protected setting.

== Het Ambulatorium ==
The same foundation also offers treatment for non-residents called Het Ambulatorium. This facility is also based in Zetten, and offers forensic diagnostics and treatment for children aged 2 – 24 years. Their main services are:

=== Diagnostics ===
For children and youth between 2 and 24 years of age forensic diagnostics are available. Examples of specialities:

- Psychiatric examination
- Neuropsychology
- Intelligence measurement
- Dyslexia / Dyscalculia testing
- Forensic psychotherapy (including sexual offenders, (Preventing of and analyze risk of recidivism)
- Several sorts of studies for Justice and/or Youth-protection agencies on family, environment, personality, resulting in a (personal) report and advice for treatment, punishment, accountability of offender etc.
- adjudicate permits for forced (psychiatric) hospitalization

=== For youth, parents and caretakers ===
The outdoor-unit also offers support, advice and treatment for (problematic) youth, their parents or caretakers. Examples are: creative therapy, Cognitive therapy, Behaviour therapy, family treatment, Grief therapy

=== Training ===
Several forms of training programs are available:

- for youth: social behavior, fear-reduction, Behaviour therapy, budget training
- parents: How to raise children, better interaction with kids during puberty, Handling (hyper)active children
- for professionals (working with youth): several courses for people interacting with children/youth in their profession. Some examples: Dealing with aggression, how to behave during crises or incidents, Sexual delinquents, Interacting with girls
- and on request OGH offers tailor-made training and training-material
