= Polder =

Reclaimed land

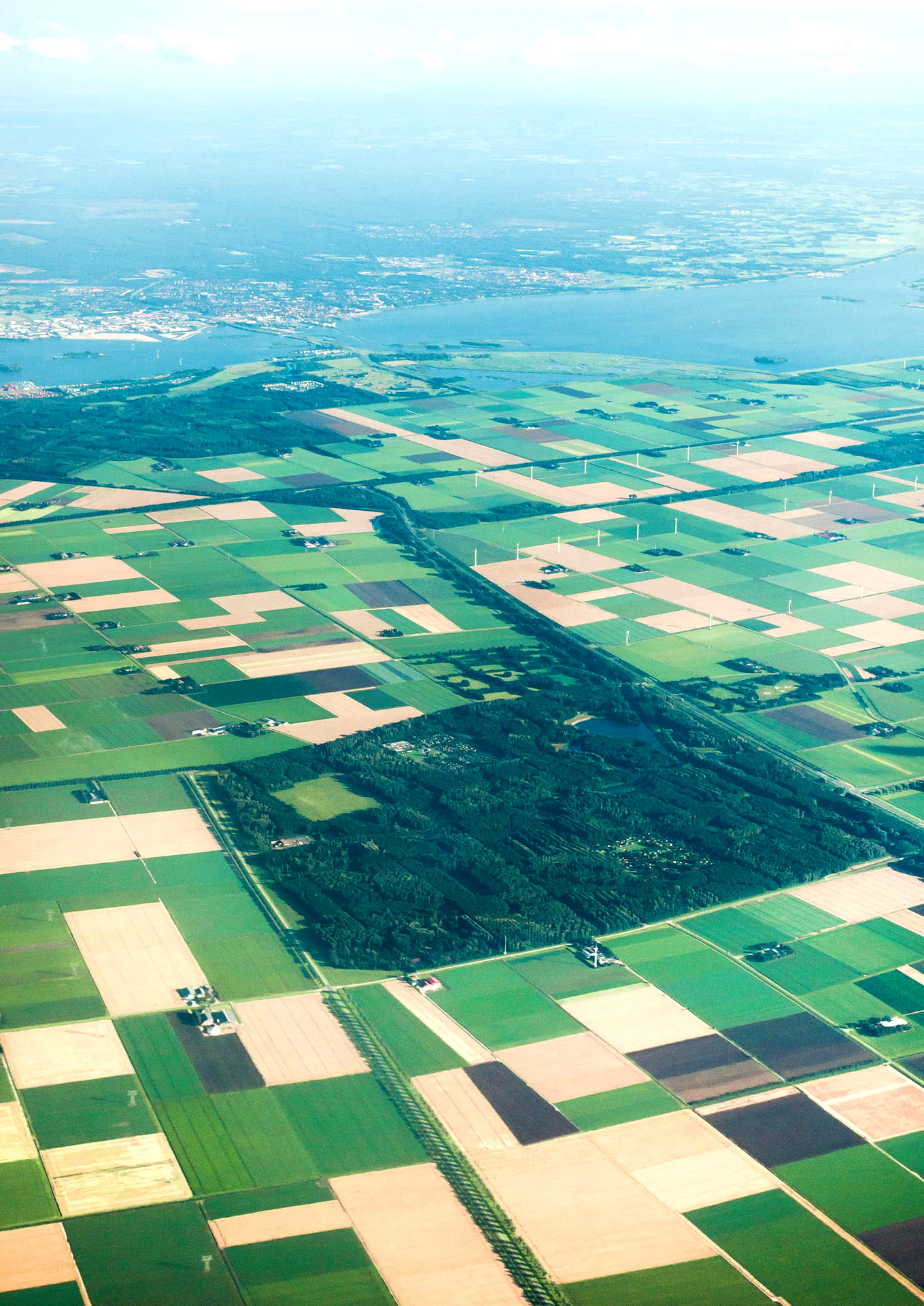
Aerial view of Flevopolder, the Netherlands

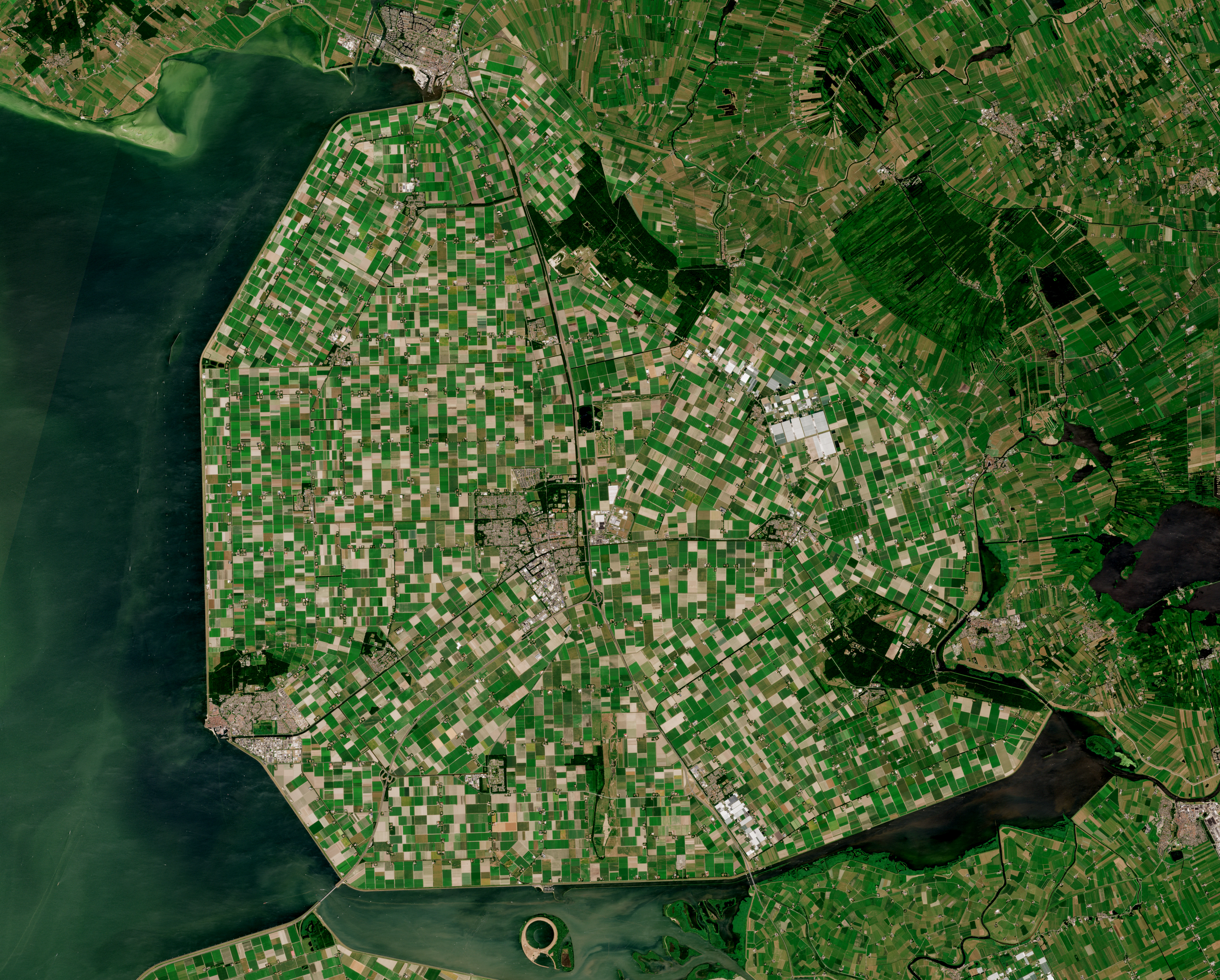
Satellite image of Noordoostpolder, the Netherlands (595.41 km^{2})

A polder (Dutch pronunciation: [ˈpɔldər]) is a low-lying tract of land that forms an artificial hydrological entity, enclosed by embankments known as dikes. The three types of polder are:

1. Land reclaimed from a body of water, such as a lake or the seabed
2. Flood plains separated from the sea or river by a dike
3. Marshes separated from the surrounding water by a dike and subsequently drained; these are also known as koogs, especially in Germany

The ground level in drained marshes subsides over time. All polders will eventually be below the surrounding water level some or all of the time. Water enters the low-lying polder through infiltration and water pressure of groundwater, or rainfall, or transport of water by rivers and canals. This usually means that the polder has an excess of water, which is pumped out or drained by opening sluices at low tide. Care must be taken not to set the internal water level too low. Polder land made up of peat (former marshland) will sink in relation to its previous level, because of peat decomposing when exposed to oxygen from the air.

Polders are at risk of flooding at all times, and care must be taken to protect the surrounding dikes. Dikes are typically built with locally available materials, and each material has its own risks: sand is prone to collapse owing to saturation by water; dry peat is lighter than water and potentially unable to retain water in very dry seasons. Some animals dig tunnels in the barrier, allowing water to infiltrate the structure; the muskrat is known for this activity and hunted in certain European countries because of it. Polders are most commonly, though not exclusively, found in river deltas, former fenlands, and coastal areas.

Flooding of polders has also been used as a military tactic in the past. One example is the flooding of the polders along the Yser River during World War I. Opening the sluices at high tide and closing them at low tide turned the polders into an inaccessible swamp, which allowed the Allied armies to stop the Imperial German army.

The Netherlands has a large area of polders: as much as 20% of the land area has at some point in the past been reclaimed from the sea. IJsselmeer is the most famous polder project of the Netherlands. Some other countries which have polders are Bangladesh, Belgium, Canada and China. Some examples of Dutch polder projects are Beemster, Schermer, Flevopolder and Noordoostpolder.

== Etymology ==
The Dutch word polder derives successively from Middle Dutch polre, from Old Dutch polra, and ultimately from pol-, a piece of land elevated above its surroundings, with the augmentative suffix -er and epenthetical -d-. The word has been adopted in thirty-six languages.

== Netherlands ==
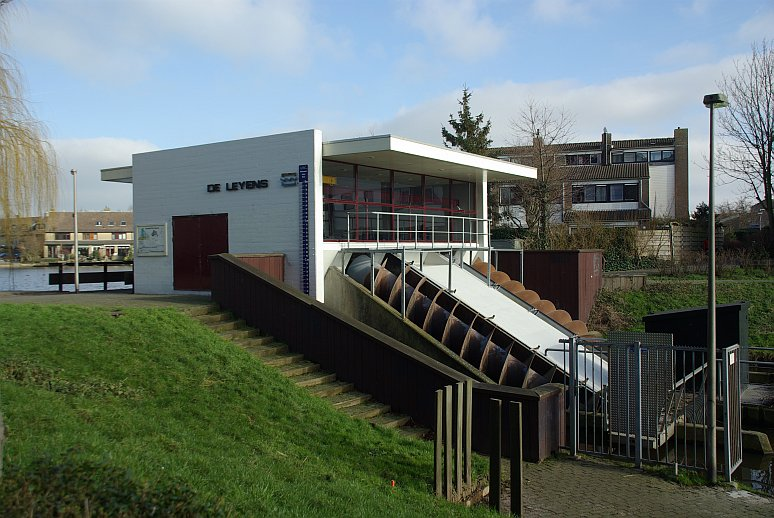
Pumping station in Zoetermeer, Netherlands: The polder lies lower than the surrounding water on the other side of the dike. The Archimedes' screws are clearly visible.

The Netherlands is frequently associated with polders, as its engineers became noted for developing techniques to drain wetlands and make them usable for agriculture and other development. This is illustrated by the saying "God created the world, but the Dutch created the Netherlands".

The Dutch have a long history of reclamation of marshes and fenland, resulting in some 3,000 polders nationwide. By 1961, about half of the country's land, 18,000 square kilometres (6,800 sq mi), was reclaimed from the sea. About half the total surface area of polders in northwest Europe is in the Netherlands. The first embankments in Europe were constructed in Roman times. The first polders were constructed in the 11th century. The oldest extant polder is the Achtermeer polder, from 1533.

As a result of flooding disasters, water boards called waterschap (when situated more inland) or hoogheemraadschap (near the sea, mainly used in the Holland region) were set up to maintain the integrity of the water defences around polders, maintain the waterways inside a polder, and control the various water levels inside and outside the polder. Water boards hold separate elections, levy taxes, and function independently from other government bodies. Their function is basically unchanged even today. As such, they are the oldest democratic institutions in the country. The necessary cooperation among all ranks to maintain polder integrity gave its name to the Dutch version of third-way politics—the Polder Model.

The 1953 flood disaster prompted a new approach to the design of dikes and other water-retaining structures, based on an acceptable probability of overflowing. Risk is defined as the product of probability and consequences. The potential damage in lives, property, and rebuilding costs is compared with the potential cost of water defences. From these calculations follows an acceptable flood risk from the sea at one in 4,000–10,000 years, while it is one in 100–2,500 years for a river flood. The particular established policy guides the Dutch government to improve flood defences as new data on threat levels become available.

Major Dutch polders and the years they were laid dry include Beemster (1609–1612), Schermer (1633–1635), and Haarlemmermeerpolder (1852). Polders created as part of the Zuiderzee Works include Wieringermeerpolder (1930), Noordoostpolder (1942) and Flevopolder (1956–1968).

== Examples ==
Polders of the World

At the Batavialand Museum in Lelystad, the Netherlands an overview of polders of the world is maintained in both English and Dutch. This overview consists of Country documents covering 104 countries. You can access these documents via the following link: Water management and polders - Museum Batavialand

=== Bangladesh ===
Bangladesh has 139 polders, of which 49 are sea-facing, while the rest are along the numerous distributaries of the Ganges-Brahmaputra-Meghna River delta. These were constructed in the 1960s to protect the coast from tidal flooding and reduce salinity incursion. They reduce long-term flooding and waterlogging following storm surges from tropical cyclones. They are also cultivated for agriculture.

=== Brazil ===
Several cities on the Paraíba Valley region (in the state of São Paulo) have polders on land claimed from the floodplains around the Paraíba do Sul river.

=== Belgium ===
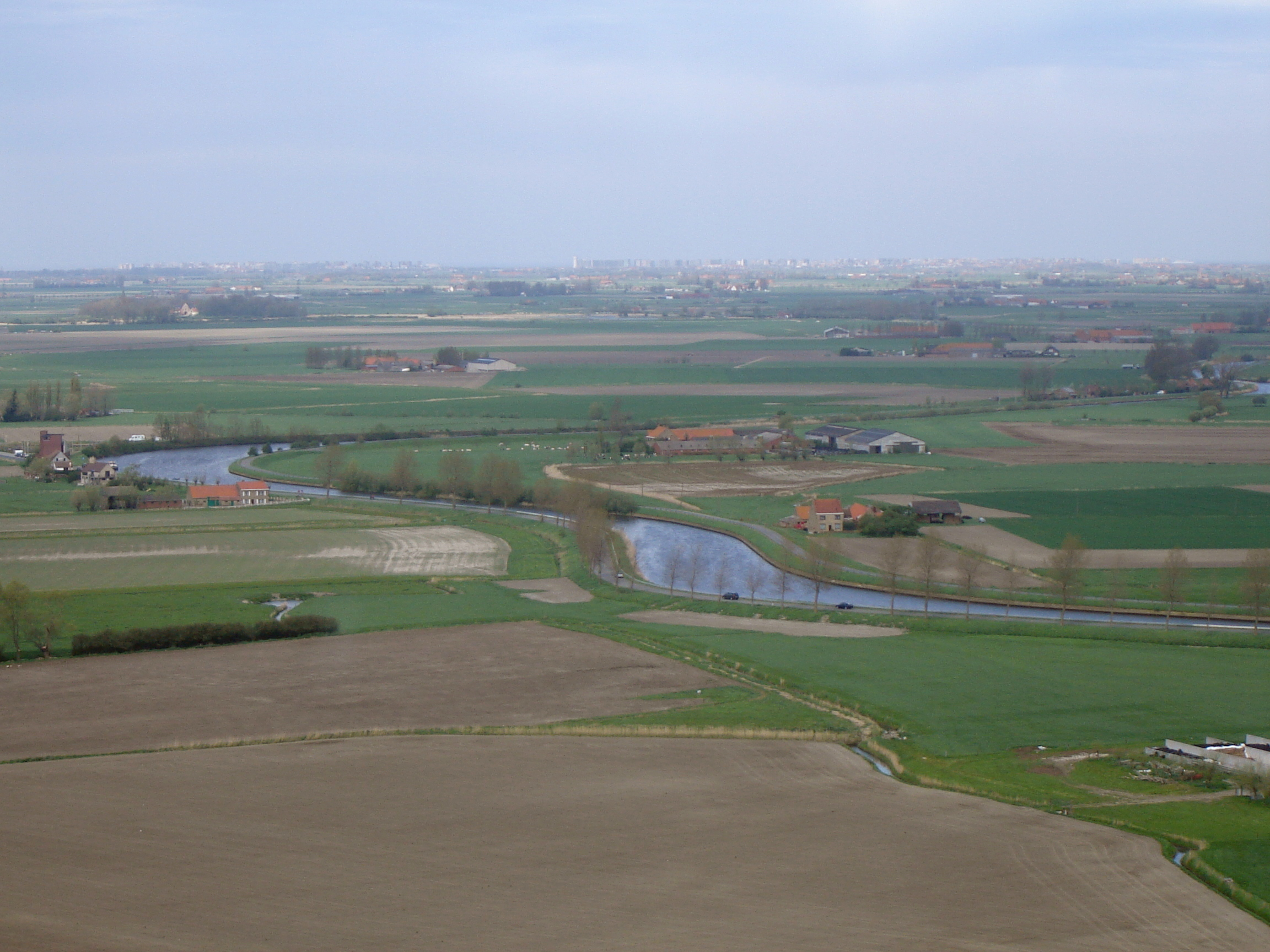
The Yser river and West Flemish polders near Diksmuide

- De Moeren, near Veurne in West Flanders
- Polders along the Yser river between Nieuwpoort and Diksmuide
- Polders of Muisbroek and Ettenhoven, in Ekeren and Hoevenen
- Polder of Stabroek, in Stabroek
- Kabeljauwpolder, in Zandvliet
- Scheldepolders on the left bank of the Scheldt
- Uitkerkse polders, near Blankenberge in West Flanders
- Prosperpolder, near Doel, Antwerp and Kieldrecht.

=== Canada ===
- Tantramar Marshes
- Holland Marsh
- Pitt Polder Ecological Reserve
- Grand Pré, Nova Scotia
- Minas Basin

=== China ===
- The city of Kunshan has over 100 polders.
- The center of the Dongting Lake basin was turned into polders.

==== History ====
The Jiangnan region, at the Yangtze River Delta, has a long history of constructing polders. Most of these projects were performed between the 10th and 13th centuries. The Chinese government also assisted local communities in constructing dikes for swampland water drainage. The Lijia (里甲) self-monitoring system of 110 households under a lizhang (里长) headman was used for the purposes of service administration and tax collection in the polder, with a liangzhang (粮长, grain chief) responsible for maintaining the water system and a tangzhang (塘长, dike chief) for polder maintenance.

=== Denmark ===
- Filsø
- Kolindsund
- Lammefjorden

=== Finland ===
- Söderfjärden
- Munsmo
- Two polders (three square kilometres or 1.2 square miles in total) near Vassor in Korsholm

=== France ===
- Marais Poitevin
- Les Moëres, adjacent to the Flemish polder De Moeren in Belgium.
- Polders de Couesnon near Mont-Saint Michel in Normandy

=== Germany ===
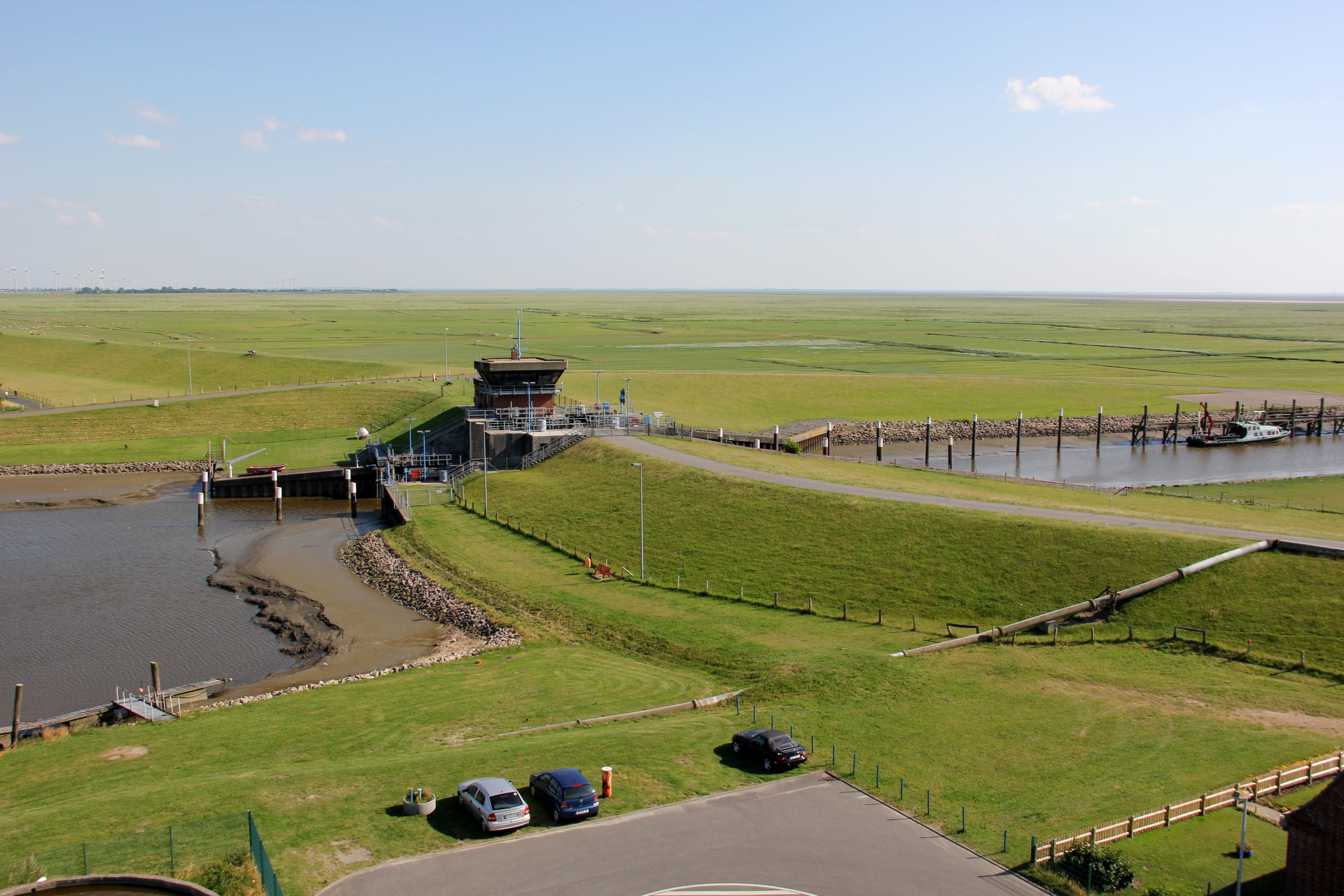
Friedrichskoog is a polder in Schleswig-Holstein

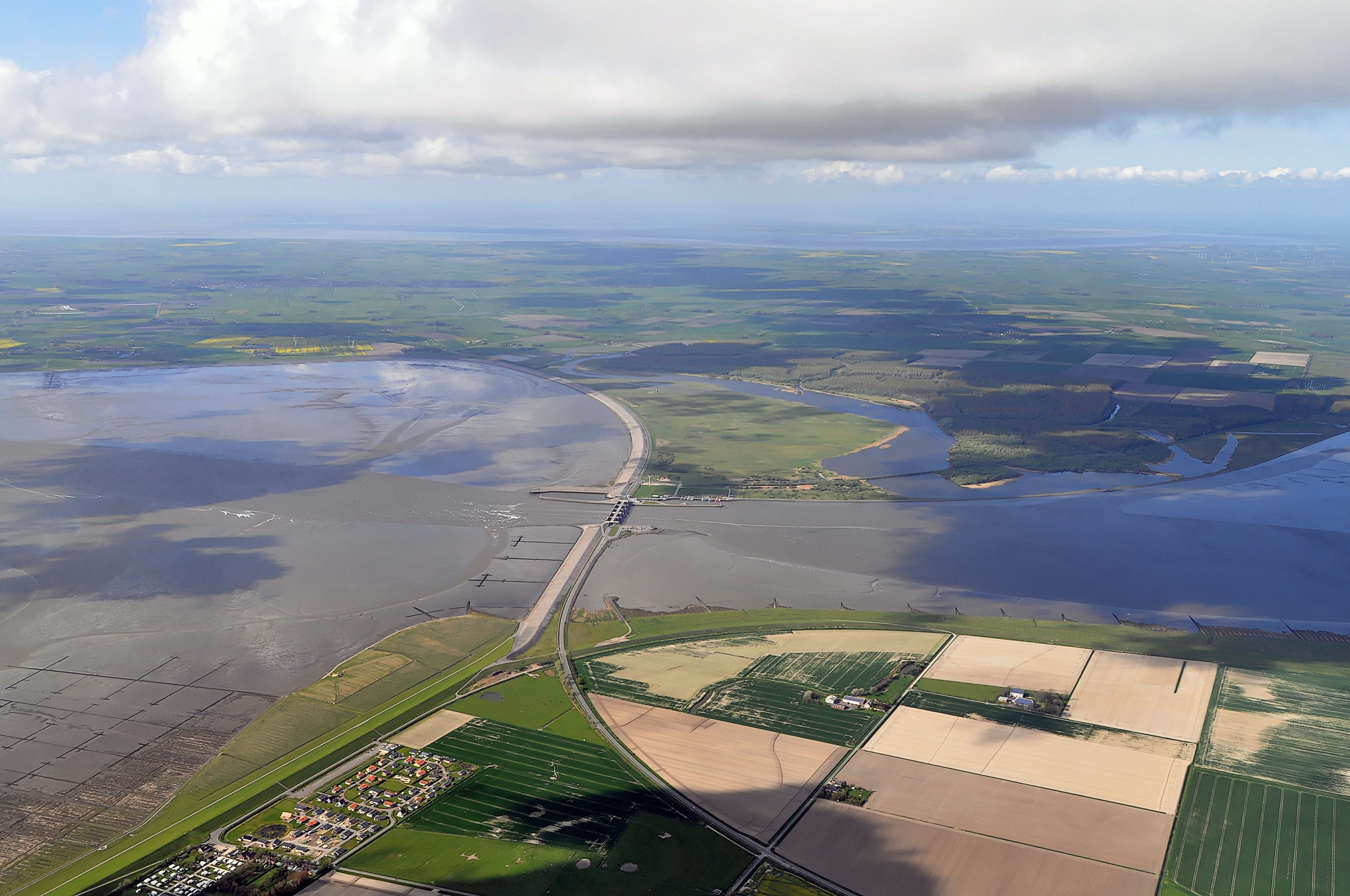
Wesselburenerkoog

In Germany, land reclaimed by diking is called a koog. The German Deichgraf system was similar to the Dutch and is widely known from Theodor Storm's novella The Rider on the White Horse.

- Altes Land near Hamburg
- Blockland and Hollerland near Bremen
- Nordstrand, Germany
- Bormerkoog and Meggerkoog near Friedrichstadt
- 36 koogs in the district of Nordfriesland
- 12 koogs in the district of Dithmarschen

In southern Germany, the term polder is used for retention basins recreated by opening dikes during river floodplain restoration, a meaning somewhat opposite to that in coastal context.

=== Guyana ===
- Black Bush Polder, Corentyne, Berbice.

=== India ===
- Kuttanad Region, Kerala

=== Ireland ===
- Lough Swilly, County Donegal. Near Inch Island and Newtowncunningham.

=== Italy ===
- Delta of the river Po, such as Bonifica Valle del Mezzano

=== Japan ===
- Around the Ariake Sea in Kyushu, mainly in Saga but also in Fukuoka and Kumamoto Prefectures
- Lake Hachirōgata in Akita was reclaimed in 1964, creating the town of Ōgata

=== Lithuania ===
- Rusnė Island

=== Netherlands ===
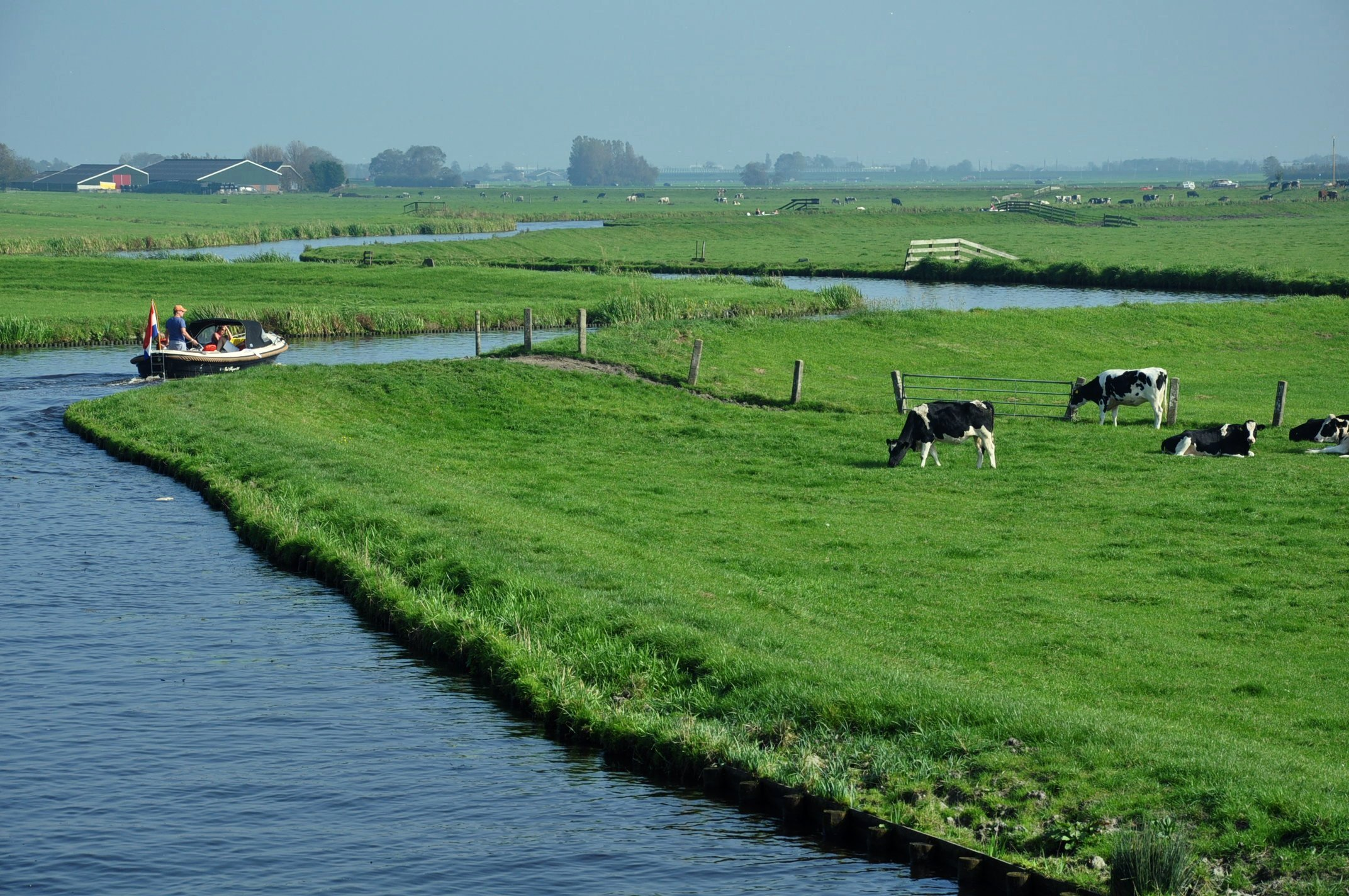
The meandering Stingsloot separates the Vrouw Vennepolder (left) and the Rode Polder (right)

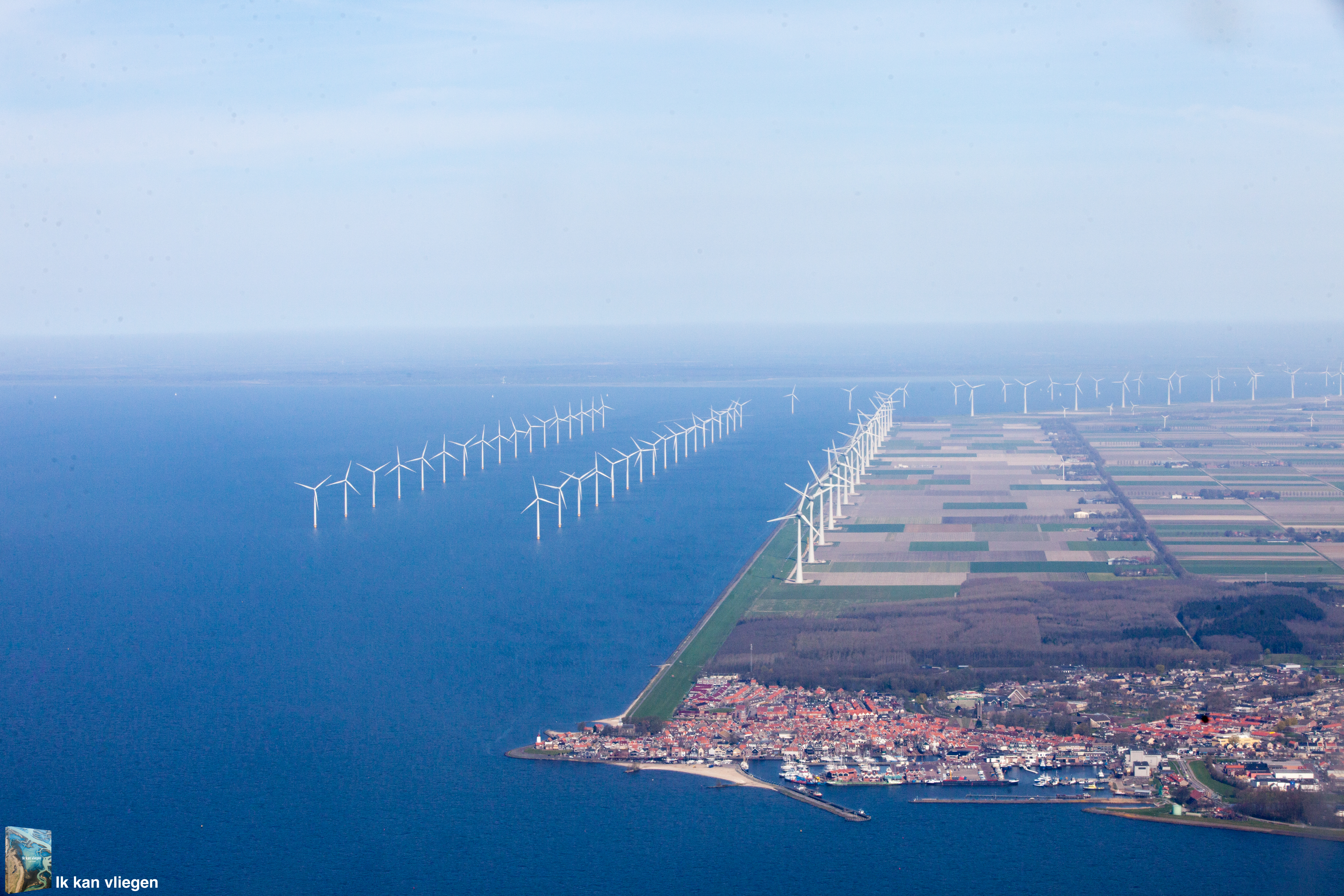
Wind farms in the Noordoostpolder

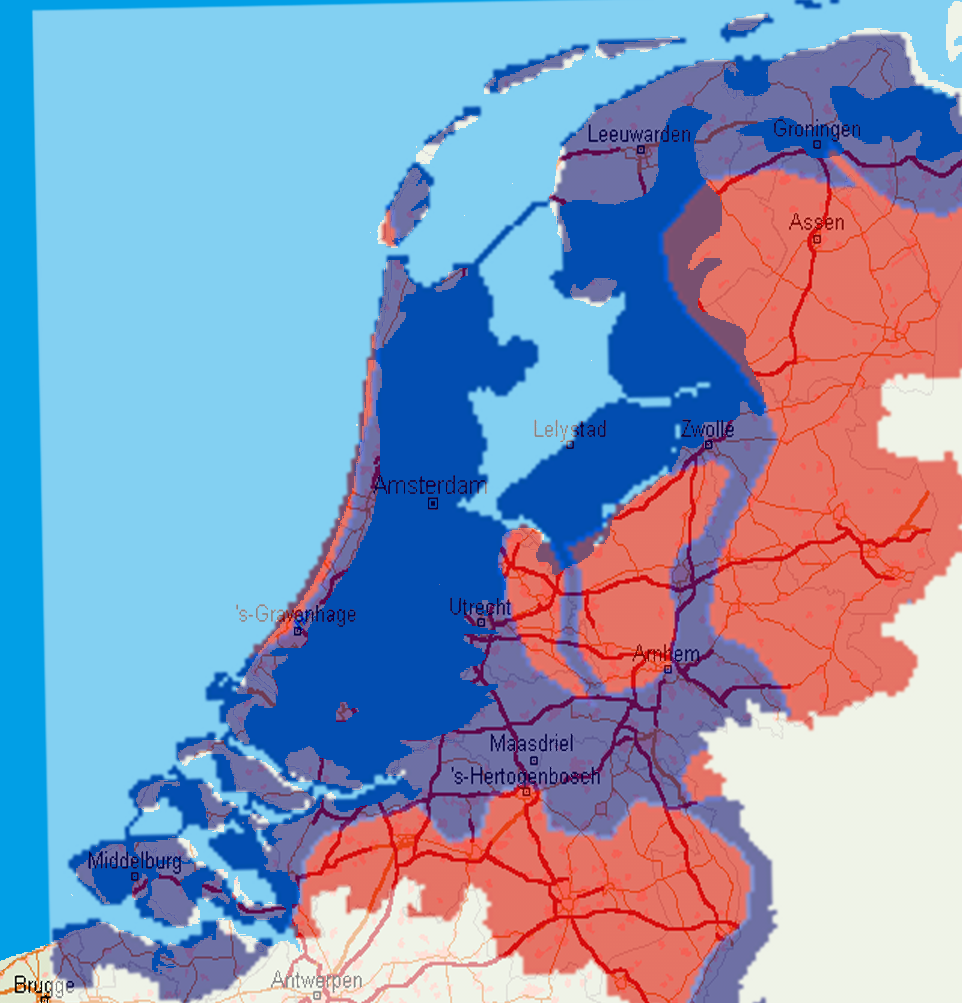
Areas of the Netherlands located below sea level (blue)

- Achtermeer, the oldest polder, from 1533
- Alblasserwaard, containing the windmills of Kinderdijk, a World Heritage Site
- Alkmaar
- Andijk
- Anna Paulownapolder
- Beemster, a World Heritage Site
- Bijlmermeer
- Flevopolder, the largest artificial island in the world, last part drained in 1968
- 's-Gravesloot
- Haarlemmermeer, containing Schiphol airport
- Krimpenerwaard
- Lauwersmeer
- Mastenbroek, one of the oldest medieval polders, drained around 1363-1364.
- Noordoostpolder
- Prins Alexanderpolder
- Purmer
- Schermer
- Watergraafsmeer
- Wieringermeer
- Wieringerwaard
- Wijdewormer
- Zestienhoven, home of the Rotterdam The Hague Airport (Overschie), in the city of Rotterdam.
- Zuidplaspolder, along with Lammefjord in Denmark the lowest point of the European Union

=== North Korea ===
- Taegye-do project in North Pyongan Province
- Honggon-do project in North Pyongan Province
- Ryongmae-do project in South Hwanghae Province

=== Poland ===
- Vistula delta near Elbląg and Nowy Dwór Gdański
- Warta delta near Kostrzyn nad Odrą

=== Romania ===
- Danube Delta

=== Singapore ===
- Parts of Pulau Tekong

=== Slovenia ===
- The Ankaran/Ancarano Polder (Slovene: Ankaranska bonifika), Semedela Polder (Semedelska bonifika), and Škocjan Polder (Škocjanska bonifika) in reclaimed land around Koper/Capodistria.

=== South Korea ===
- Parts of the coast of Ganghwa Island, adjacent to the river Han in Incheon
- Delta of the river Nakdong in Busan
- Saemangeum in North Jeolla Province

=== Spain ===
- Parts of Málaga were built on reclaimed land

=== United Kingdom ===
- Traeth Mawr
- Sunk Island, on the north shore of the Humber east of Hull
- Caldicot and Wentloog Levels along the Severn Estuary in South Wales
- Parts of The Fens
  - Branston Island, by the River Witham outside the conventional area of the fens but connected to them.
- Parts of the coast of Essex
- Some land along the River Plym in Plymouth
- Some land around Meathop east of Grange-over-Sands, reclaimed as a side-effect of building a railway embankment
- The Somerset Levels and North Somerset Levels
- Romney Marsh
- Sealand, Flintshire
- Humberhead Levels

=== United States ===
- New Orleans
- Sacramento – San Joaquin River Delta

== See also ==
- Afsluitdijk
- Flood control in the Netherlands
- Land reclamation
- Windpump
