= Hemmen =

- Village
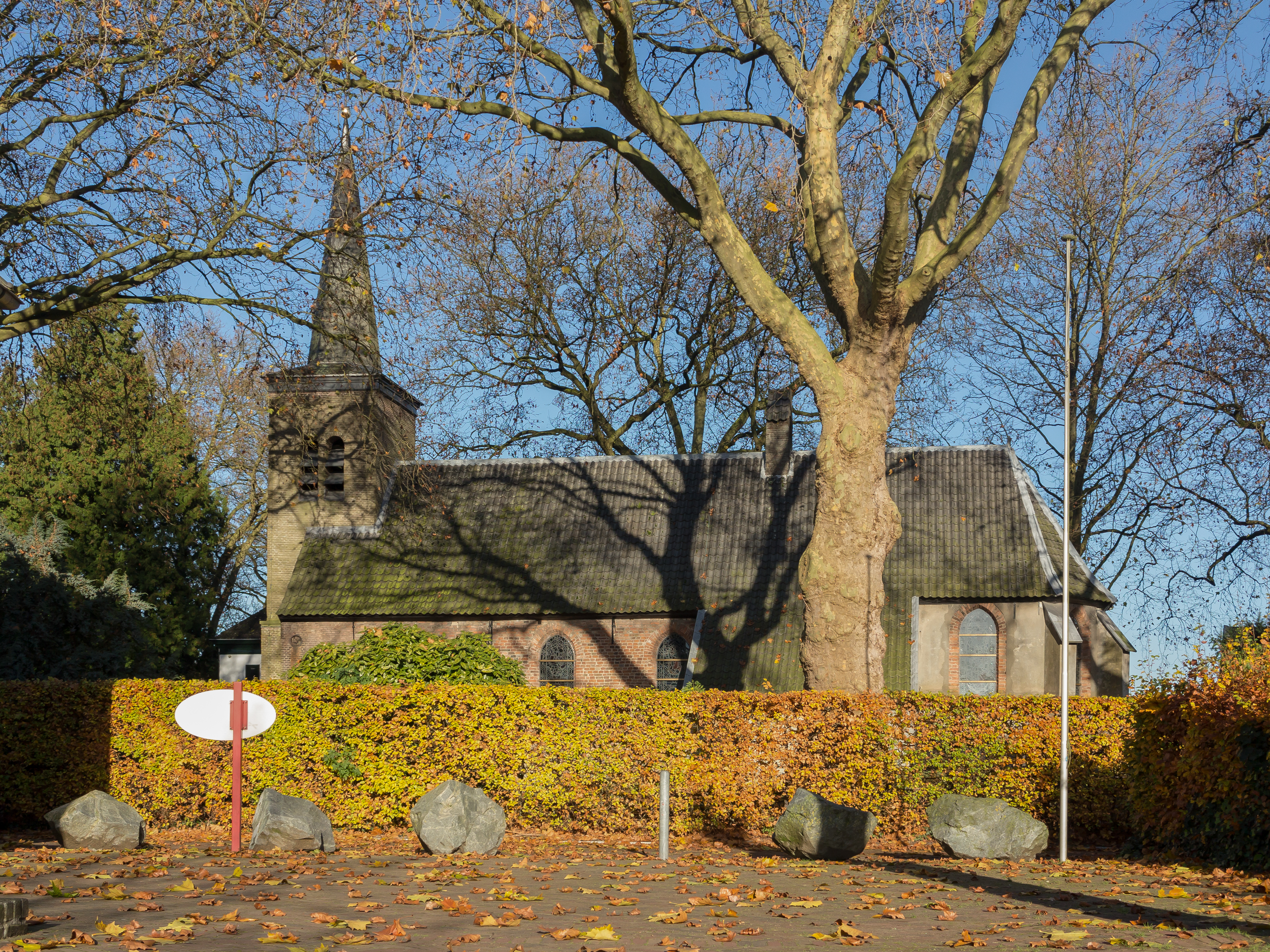
- Reformed Church of Hemmen

- Coat of arms

- Location in the Netherlands Hemmen (Netherlands)
- Coordinates: 51°56′2″N 5°42′2″E
- Country: Netherlands
- Province: Gelderland
- Municipality: Overbetuwe

Area
  - Total: 2.43 km^{2} (0.94 sq mi)
- Elevation: 7 m (23 ft)

Population (2021)
  - Total: 175
  - Density: 72.0/km^{2} (187/sq mi)
- Time zone: UTC+1 (CET)
  - Summer (DST): UTC+2 (CEST)
- Postal code: 6672
- Dialing code: 0488

Hemmen (Dutch pronunciation: [ˈɦɛmə(n)]) is a village in the Dutch province of Gelderland. It is located in the municipality of Overbetuwe, 1 km northwest of Zetten.

Hemmen was a separate municipality until 1955, when it was merged with Valburg.

== History ==
It was first mentioned in 1327 as Hemmen. The etymology is unclear. The church probably dates from the 13th century. It was enlarged in 1741, and the tower has built around 1800. It was extensively restored in 1932 to 1933. Castle Hemmen was built in 1360, and demolished in 1750. In 1757, a manor house was built in its place and was surrounded by a moat. It was destroyed in 1945. In 1840, Hemmen was home to 209 people.

== Gallery ==
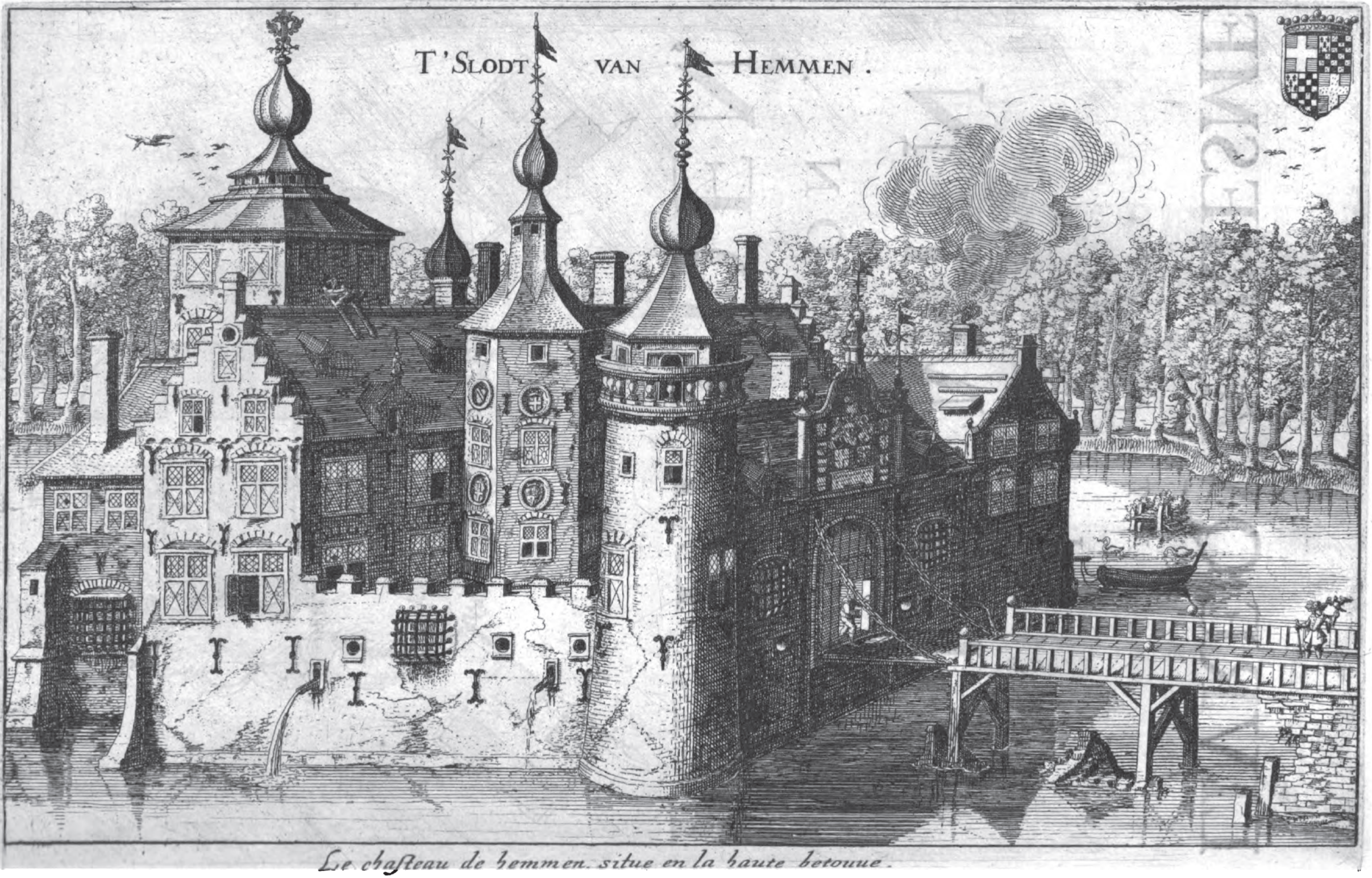
Castle Hemmen

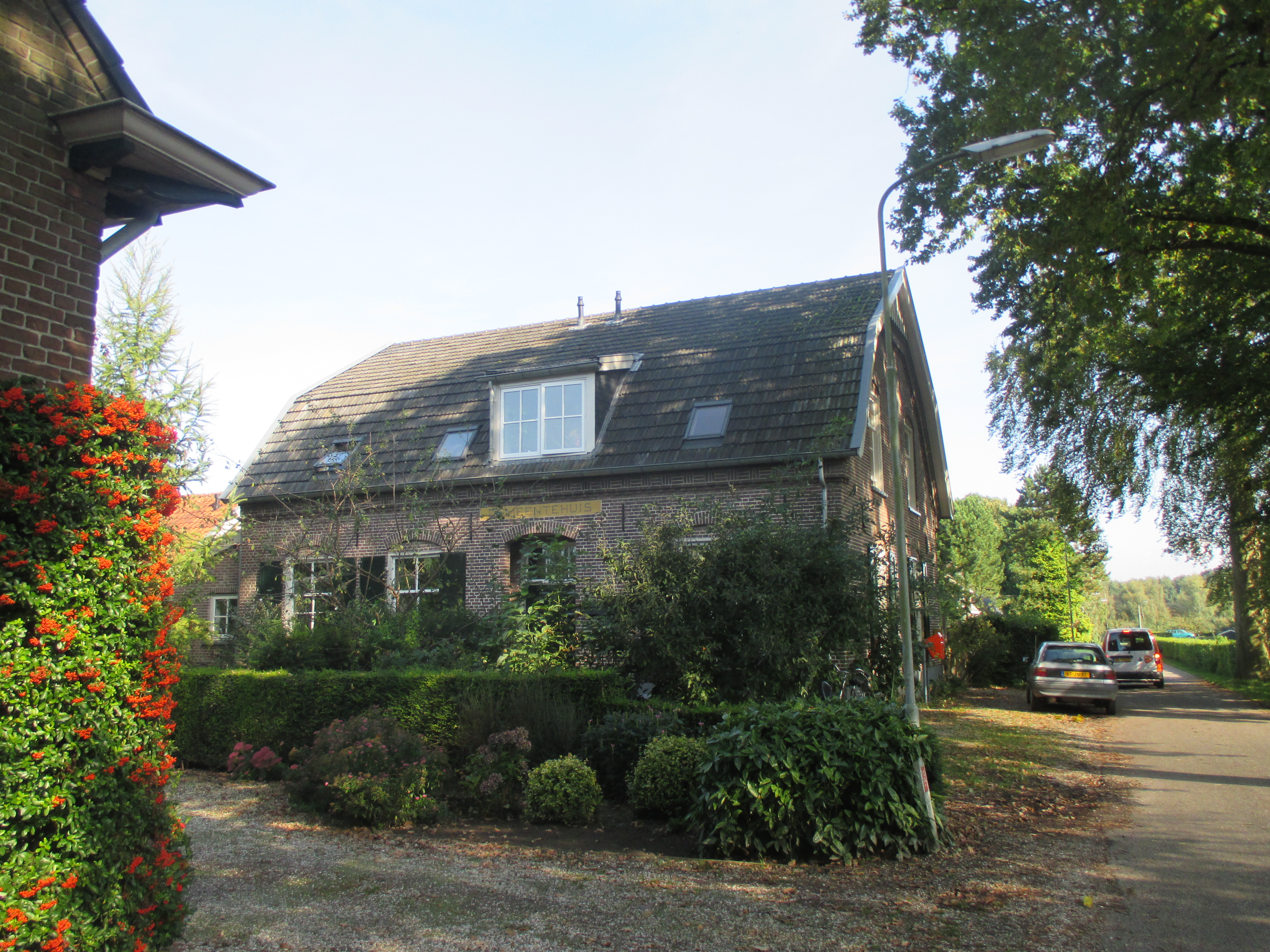
Former town hall

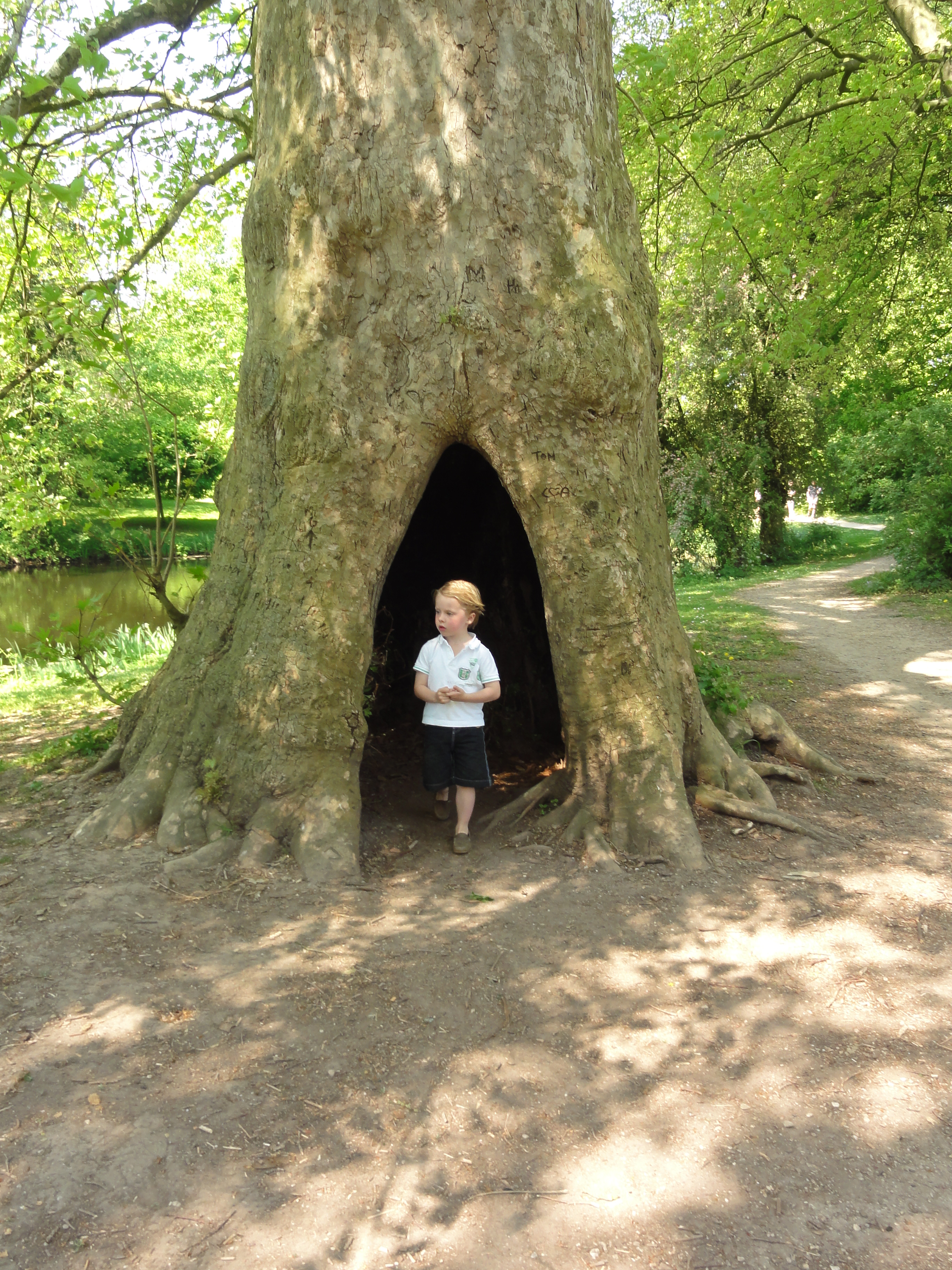
Hollow tree

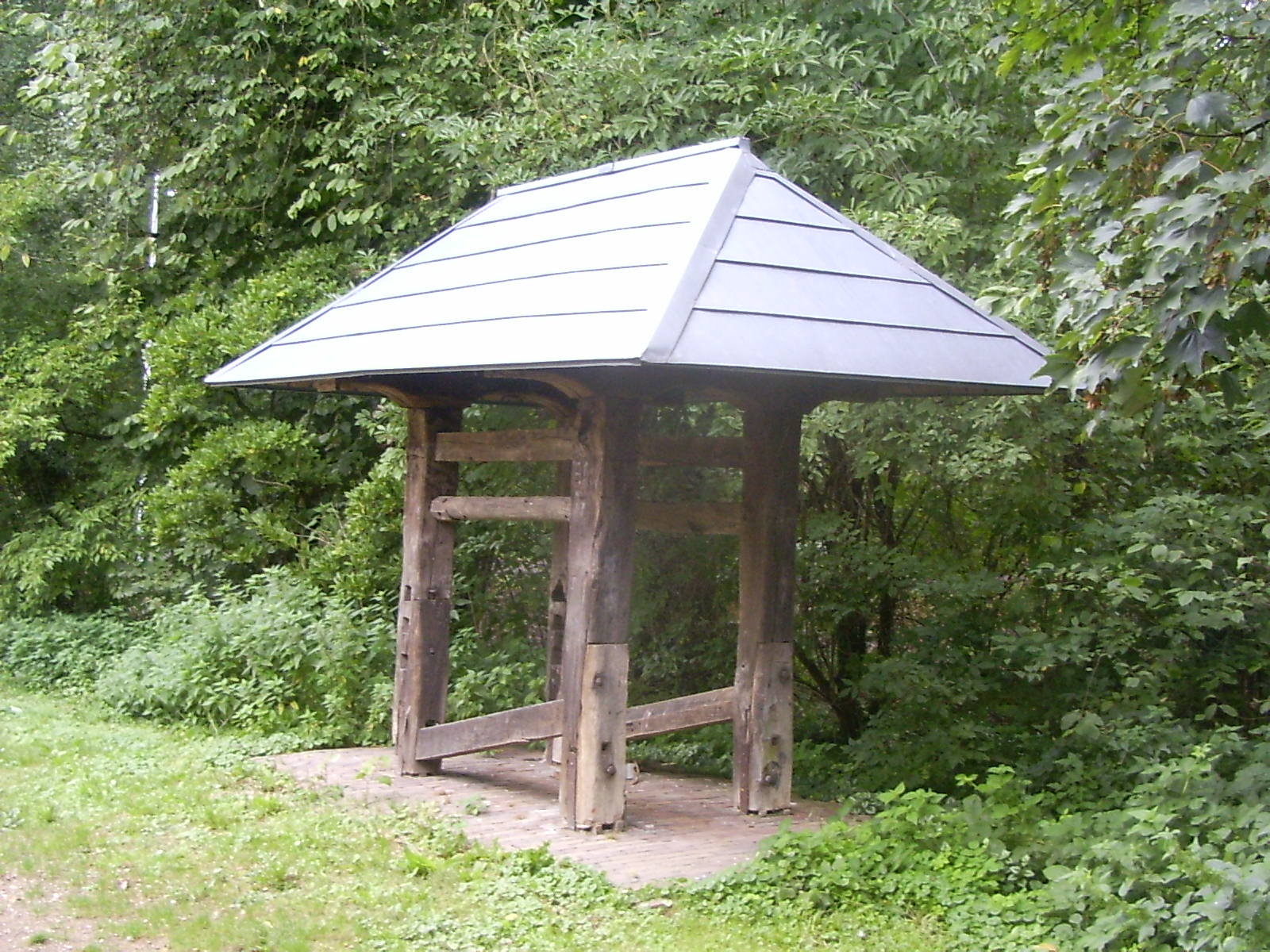
Horse rack
