= Zetten =

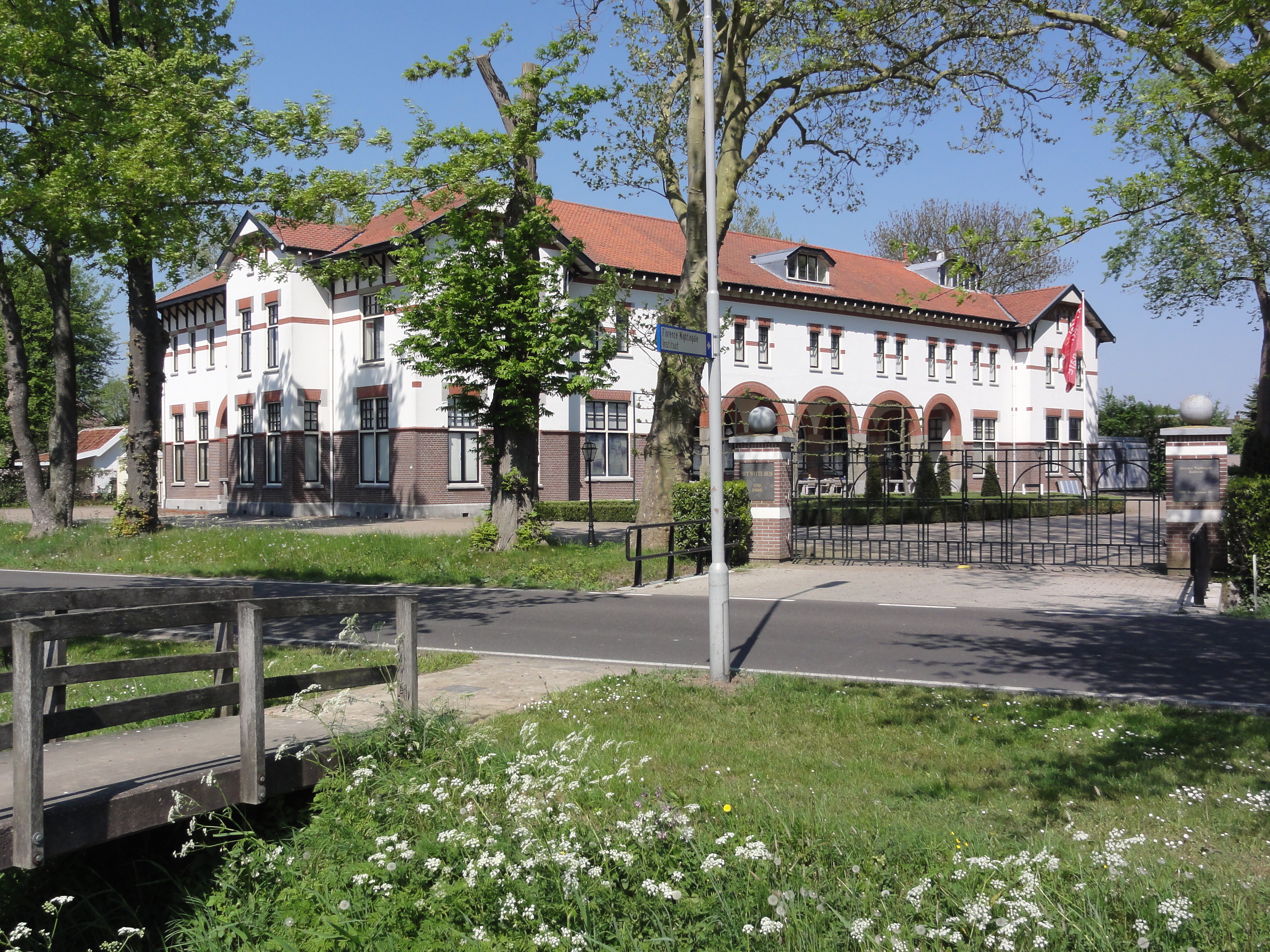
- Zetten Florence Nightingale instituut

- Location within Gelderland Location within Netherlands
- Coordinates: 51°55′40″N 5°42′45″E
- Country: Netherlands
- Province: Gelderland
- Municipality: Overbetuwe

Population (1 January 2009)
  - Total: 5,250

Zetten (Dutch pronunciation: [ˈzɛtə(n)]) is a village in the Overbetuwe municipality, Gelderland, Netherlands. The village is located in the Betuwe.

This is also the base of the (forensic) youth-clinic Ottho Gerhard Heldringstichting, founded as the "Steenbeek" asylum for reforming prostitutes by Ottho Gerhard Heldring.

== History ==
Archaeological finds indicate that the area around Zetten and the neighbouring village of Herveld was inhabited in the Roman era. The area was located on the border of the Empire and the area inhabited by Germanic tribes.

It is located between two rivers, on slightly higher ground, such that it was less often flooded in times when no dykes were present.

The settlement of Sethone (Zetten) was mentioned in a deed of 1005, in which Heribert of Cologne gave the local church to the monastery in Deutz.

Six inhabitants of Zetten lost their lives in floodings of the Betuwe in 1809.

The area around Zetten and the nearby village of Hemmen saw heavy fighting in the winter of 1944 and 1945, in the aftermath of Operation Market Garden.

== Population ==
Zetten had a population of 510 in 1840. By 1872, the population had grown to 1096, and in 1890 there were 1563 inhabitants. On 2007-01-01, Zetten had 5,209 inhabitants.

== Sport ==
There is a public swimming pool and a football club in Zetten.

== Gallery ==
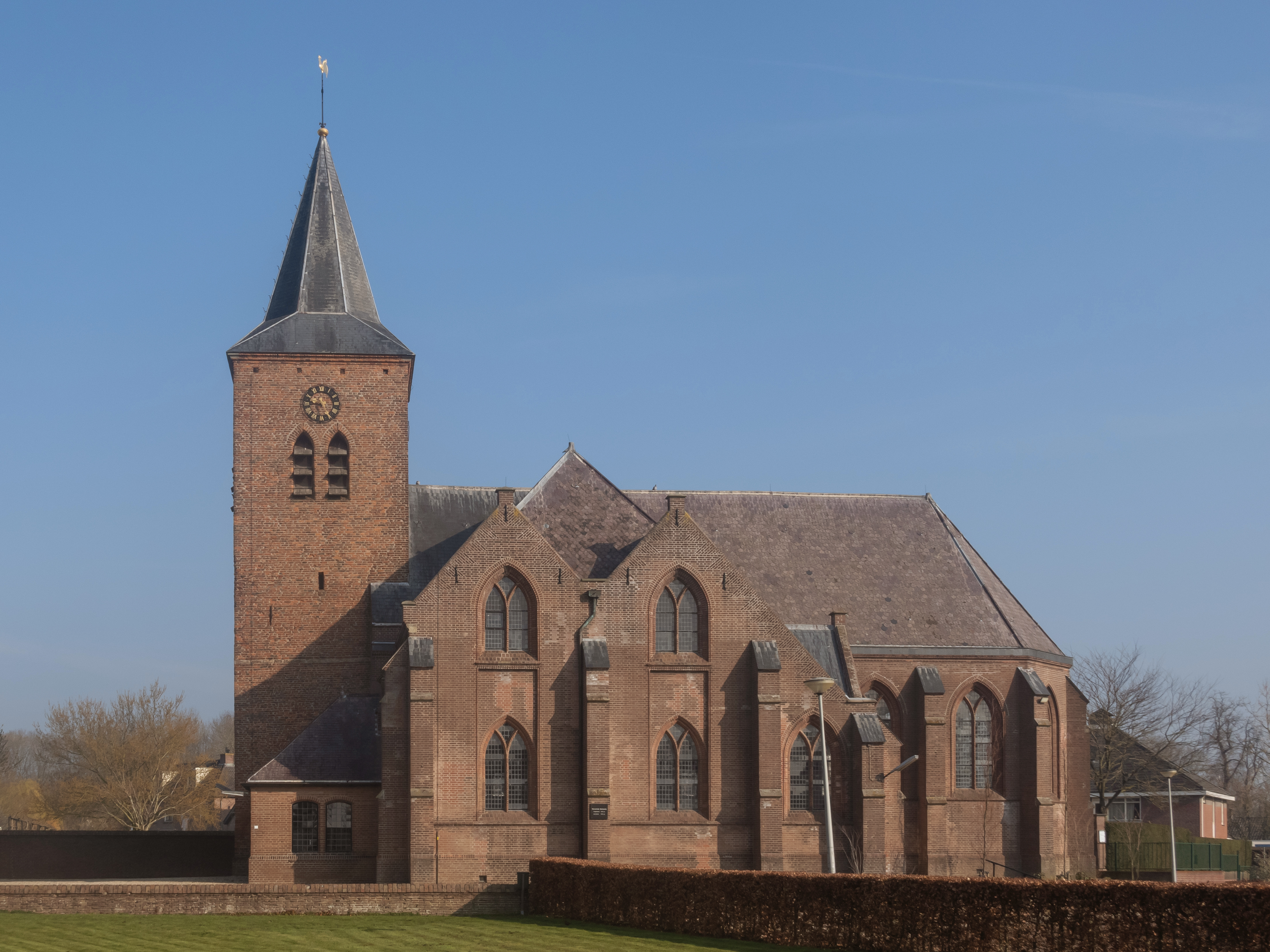
Church: de Dorpskerk

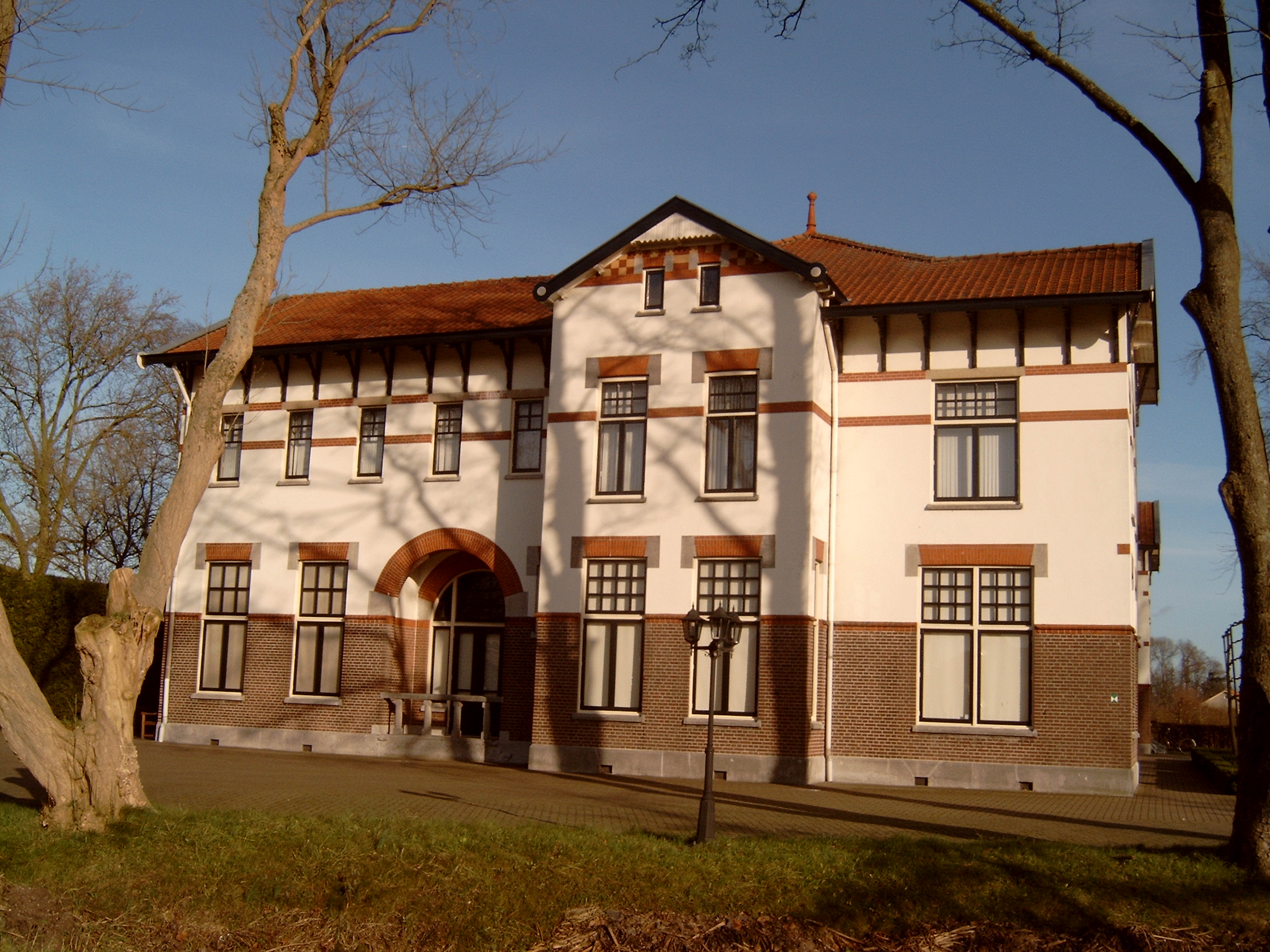
landhouse: het Witte Huis
