= Geertruy Haeck =

Geertruy Haeck-van Slingelandt van der Tempel
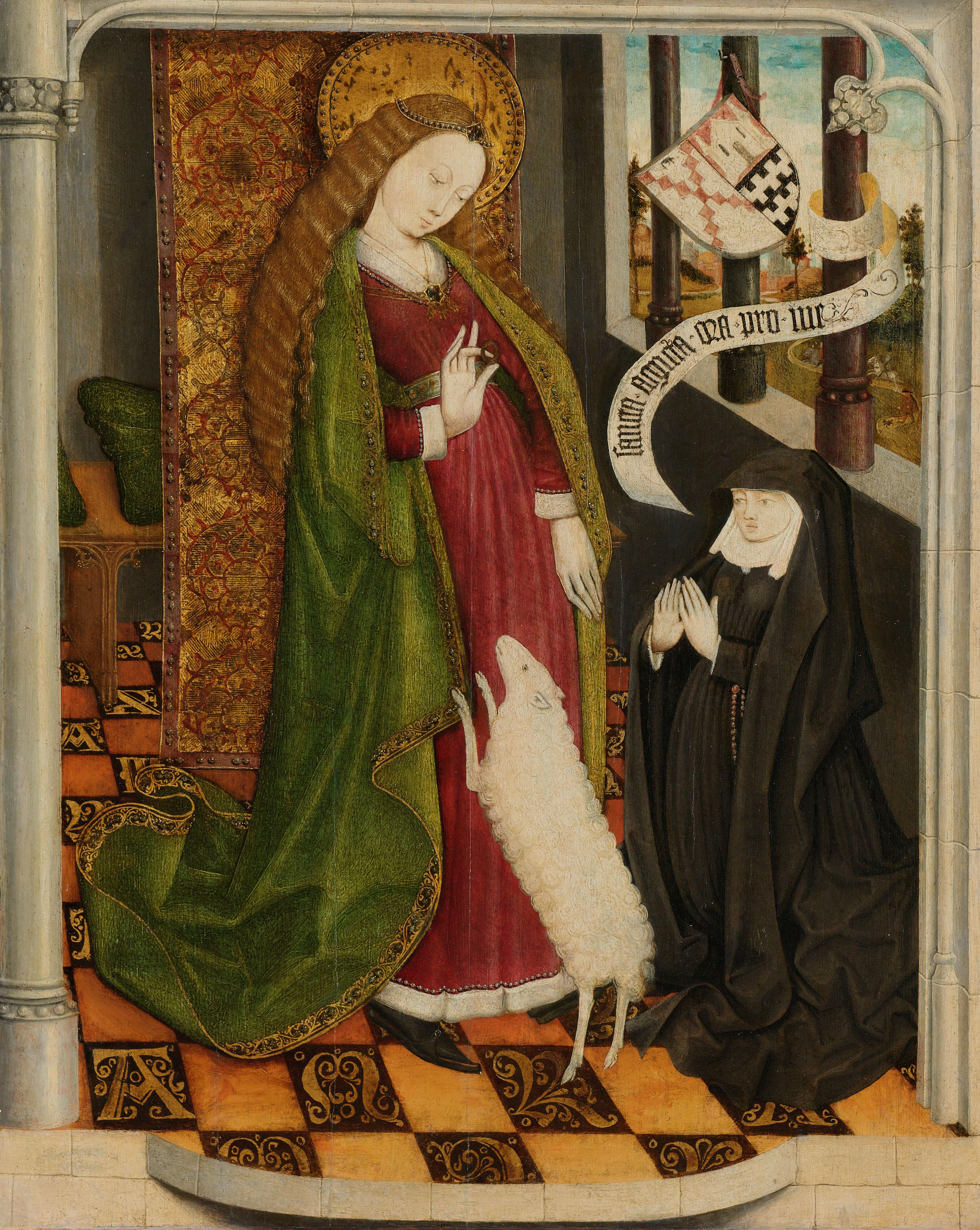
- Geertruy Haeck venerating St Agnes
- Occupation: canoness regular
- Years active: mid-15th century

Geertruy Haeck-van Slingelandt van der Tempel was a 15th-century Dutch patrician woman.

== Life ==
Geertruy was married to Adriaen Hermansz. Haeck, who served as mayor of Dordrecht 1443–44 and 1446–48. After being widowed she entered the congregation of canonesses regular of St Agnes (Sint-Agnesklooster).

== Portrait ==
Around 1465 Haeck had her portrait painted kneeling in veneration of St Agnes. This portrait was bought by the Rijksmuseum, Amsterdam, in 1957 for £4,300.
