= Anna Paulownapolder =

Coordinates: 52°51′N 4°51′E

The Anna Paulownapolder (Dutch pronunciation: [ˈɑnaː pɑˈloːnaːˌpɔldər]) is a polder in the municipality of Hollands Kroon in the province of North Holland in the Netherlands. The area of the polder is 50 square kilometres and it forms an important horticulture area, with among other things flower bulb cultivation.

The Anna Paulownapolder was from the 7th century to the 12th centuries, the habitat of both the Frisian and Gelderlandish emigrants. The latter lived in the area where now the places Westeinde and Gelderse Buurt are. Afterwards the area became uninhabitable because of several storms and floods.

After impoldering of the Zijpe in the 16th century, other areas were drained slowly. In 1846, the Anna Paulownapolder was drained at last, with private money.

The polder is named after the wife of King Willem II, Anna Pavlovna of Russia. The new polder was then under the municipality of Zijpe; on August 1, 1870, the polder became its own municipality, Anna Paulowna (since 2012 part of Hollands Kroon).
