= Truus Looijs =

Dutch swimmer (born 1946)

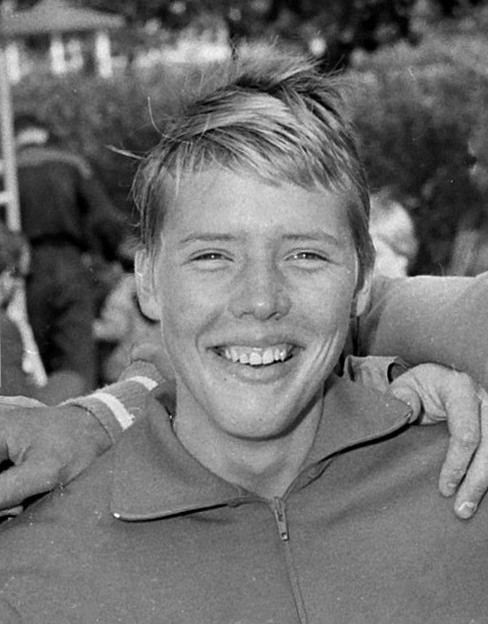
- Truus Looijs in 1965

Personal information
- Born: 27 June 1946 (age 80) Wageningen, the Netherlands
- Height: 1.76 m (5 ft 9 in)
- Weight: 66 kg (146 lb)

Sport
- Sport: Swimming
- Club: De Rijn, Wageningen

Geertruida "Truus" Looijs (also Looys; born 27 June 1946) is a retired Dutch swimmer. She competed at the 1964 Summer Olympics in the 200 m breaststroke event, but failed to reach the final.
