= Kamerik-Houtdijken =

Former municipality of the Netherlands

Coordinates: 52.109036°N 4.912262°E

Kamerik-Houtdijken is a former municipality in the Dutch province of Utrecht. It existed from 1818 to 1857, after which it merged with 's-Gravesloot, Kamerik-Mijzijde, and Teckop, to form the new municipality of Kamerik.

During that time, it had about 620 inhabitants, in three polders: Kamerik-Teylingens, Groot-Houtdijk, and Klein-Houtdijk. This included the village of Oud-Kamerik, the hamlet Houtdijken, and half of the village of Kamerik.
