= 's-Gravesloot =

Former municipality in Utrecht, Netherlands

Coordinates: 52°5′42″N 4°52′45″E

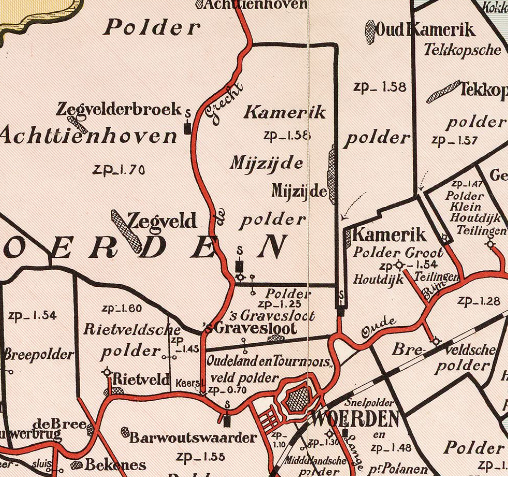
's-Gravesloot on a map from 1901

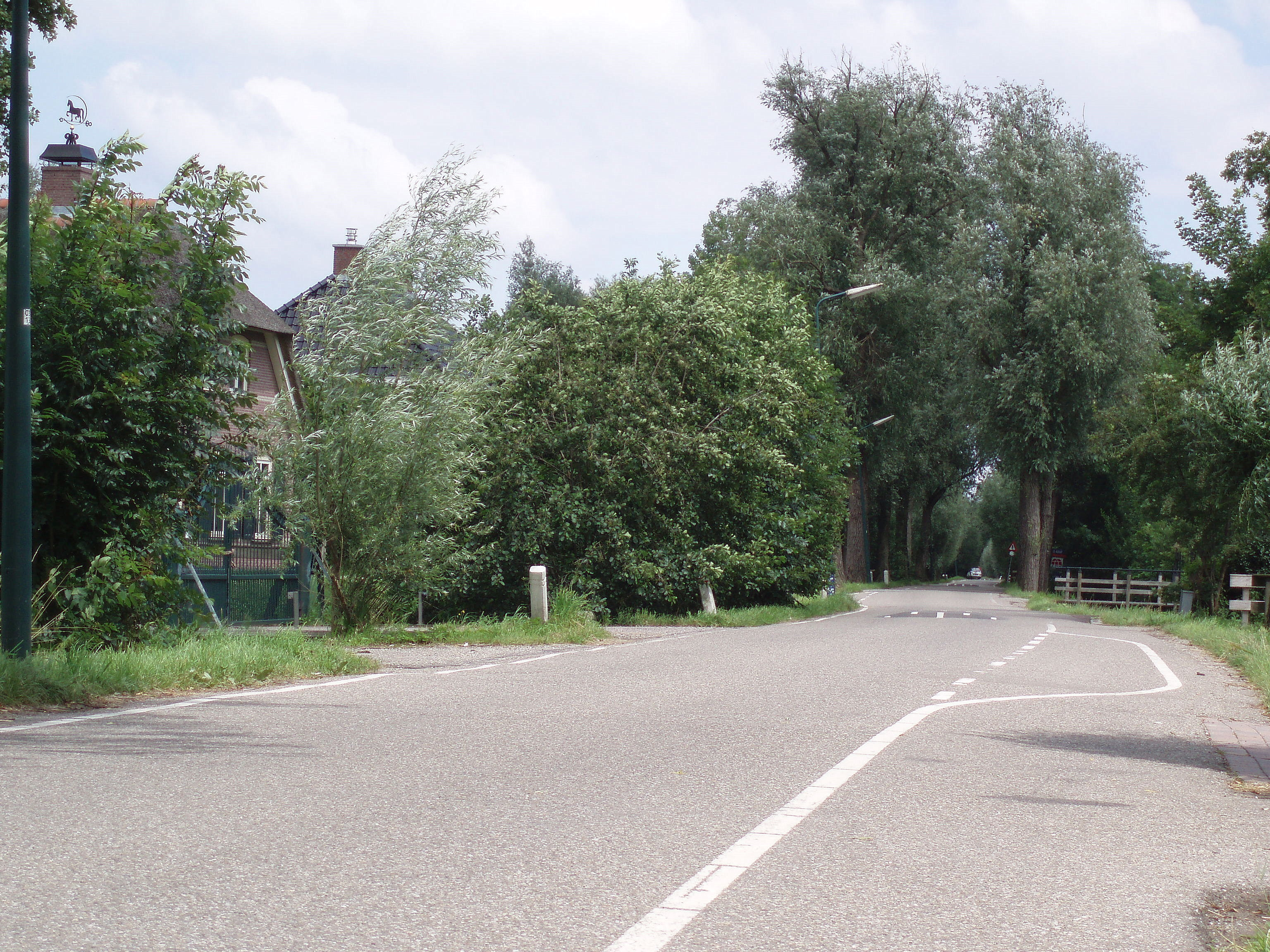
's-Gravesloot in 2007

's-Gravesloot is a former hamlet and municipality in the Dutch province of Utrecht. It was located between Kamerik and Woerden.

's-Gravesloot was a heerlijkheid (manor) owned by the province of Utrecht until 1751, when it was sold to a private owner. When the current municipal system was introduced in the Netherlands in 1812, it became part of Kamerik. When that municipality was split into three parts, 's-Gravesloot became a separate municipality again. In 1857, Kamerik-Mijzijde, Kamerik-Houtdijken, and 's-Gravesloot merged again, to form the new municipality of Kamerik. Kamerik and 's-Gravesloot are now part of Woerden.

The municipality of 's-Gravesloot consisted of a polder with the same name, covered an area of 3.23 km^{2}, and contained the hamlet of 's-Gravesloot. It had a population of about 110.
