= Teckop =

- Hamlet
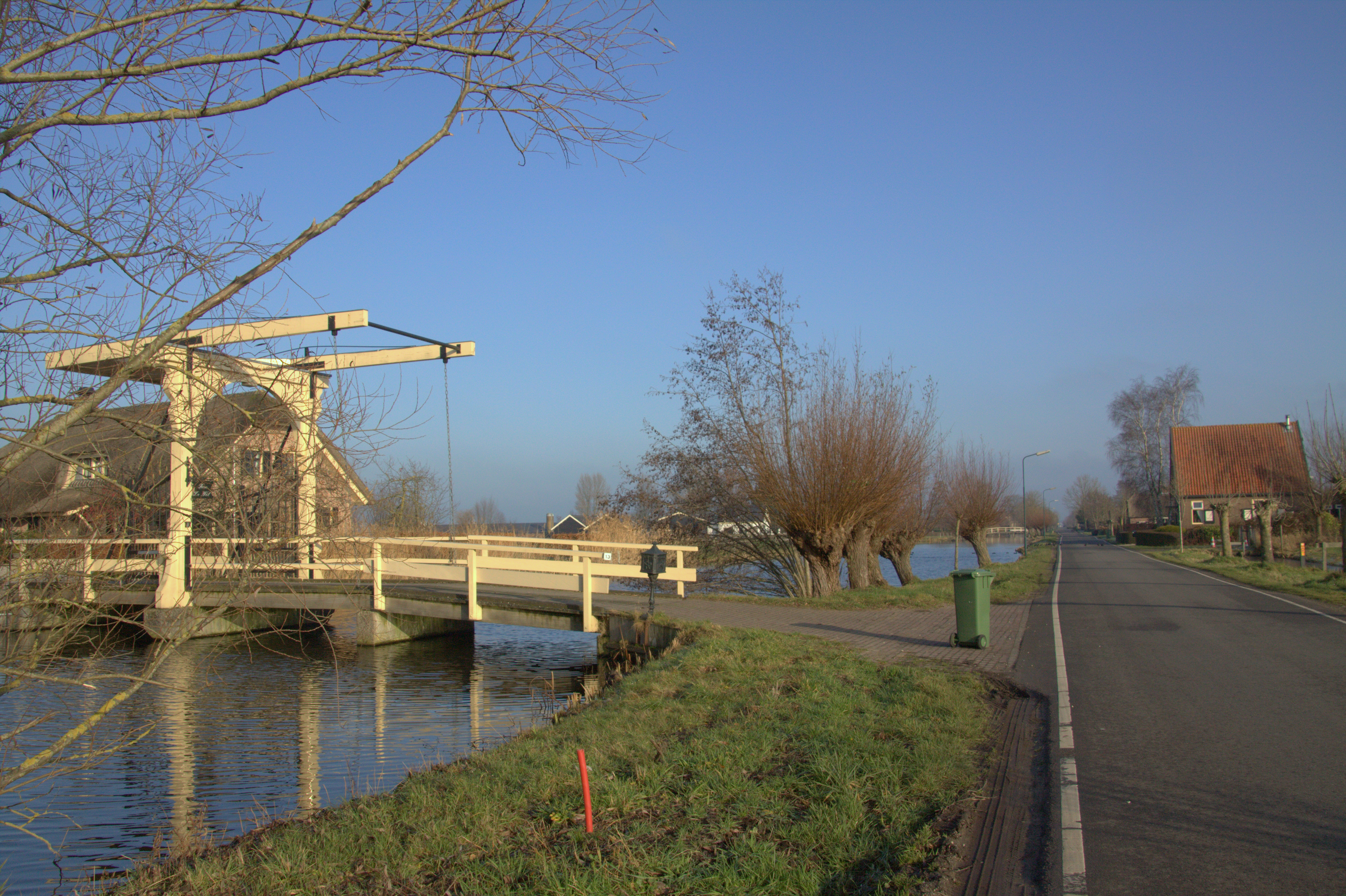
- Bridge in Teckop

- Location in the Netherlands Teckop (Netherlands)
- Coordinates: 52°08′00″N 4°55′17″E
- Country: Netherlands
- Province: Utrecht (province)
- Municipality: Woerden
- Time zone: UTC+1 (CET)
  - Summer (DST): UTC+2 (CEST)
- Postal code: 3471
- Dialing code: 0348

Teckop is a hamlet in the Dutch province of Utrecht. It is a part of the municipality of Woerden, and lies about six km northeast of Woerden.

Teckop was a separate municipality from 1817 to 1857, when it was merged with Kamerik.

Teckop is not a statistical entity, and the postal authorities have placed it under Kamerik.

The hamlet was first mentioned between 1280 and 1287 as teykincoep, and means "concession of Teyke (person)". Teckop used to have place name sign, however they have been removed. In 1840, it was home to 161 people. Nowadays, it consists of about 40 houses.

== Gallery ==
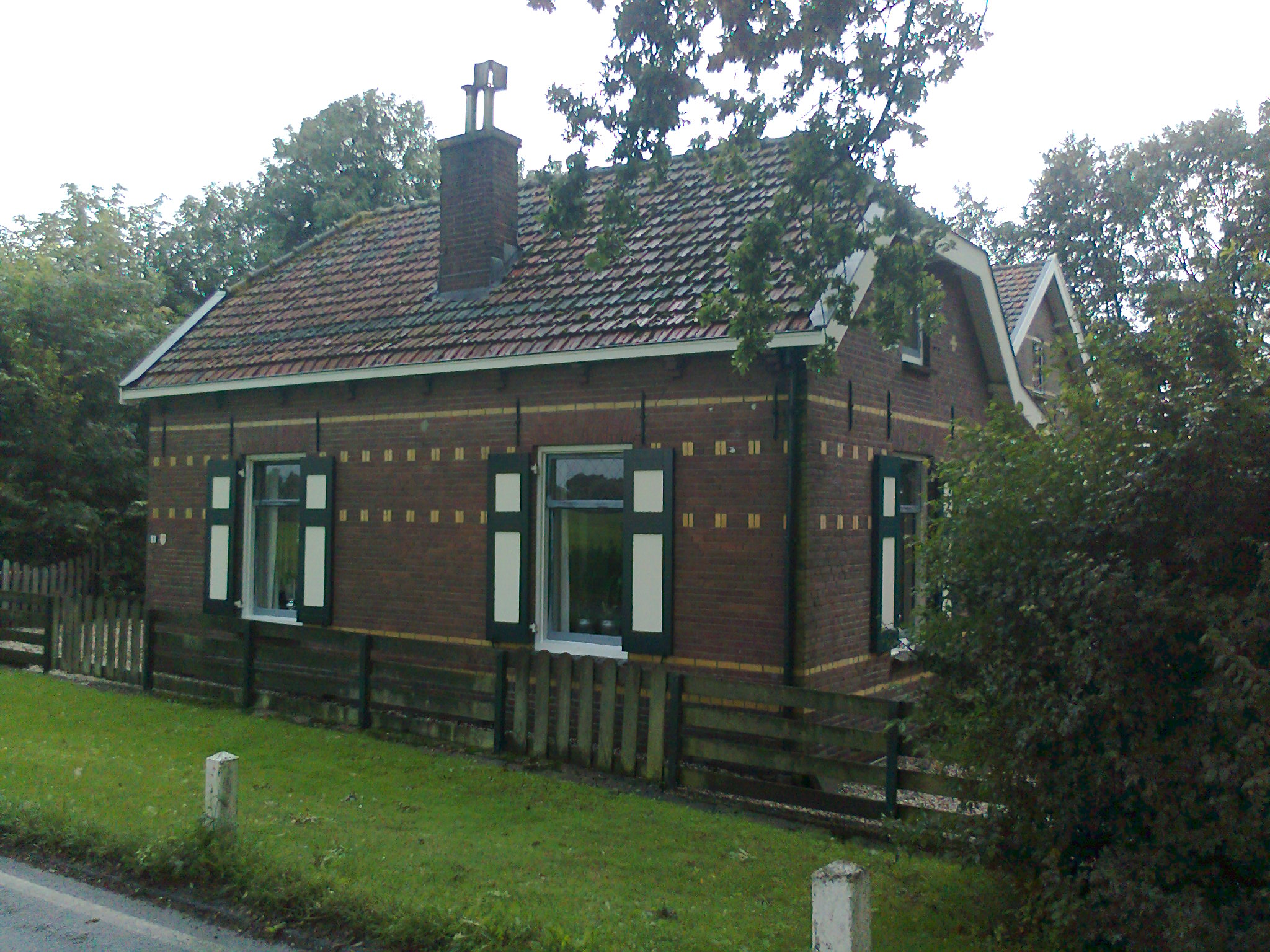
Pumping station in Teckop

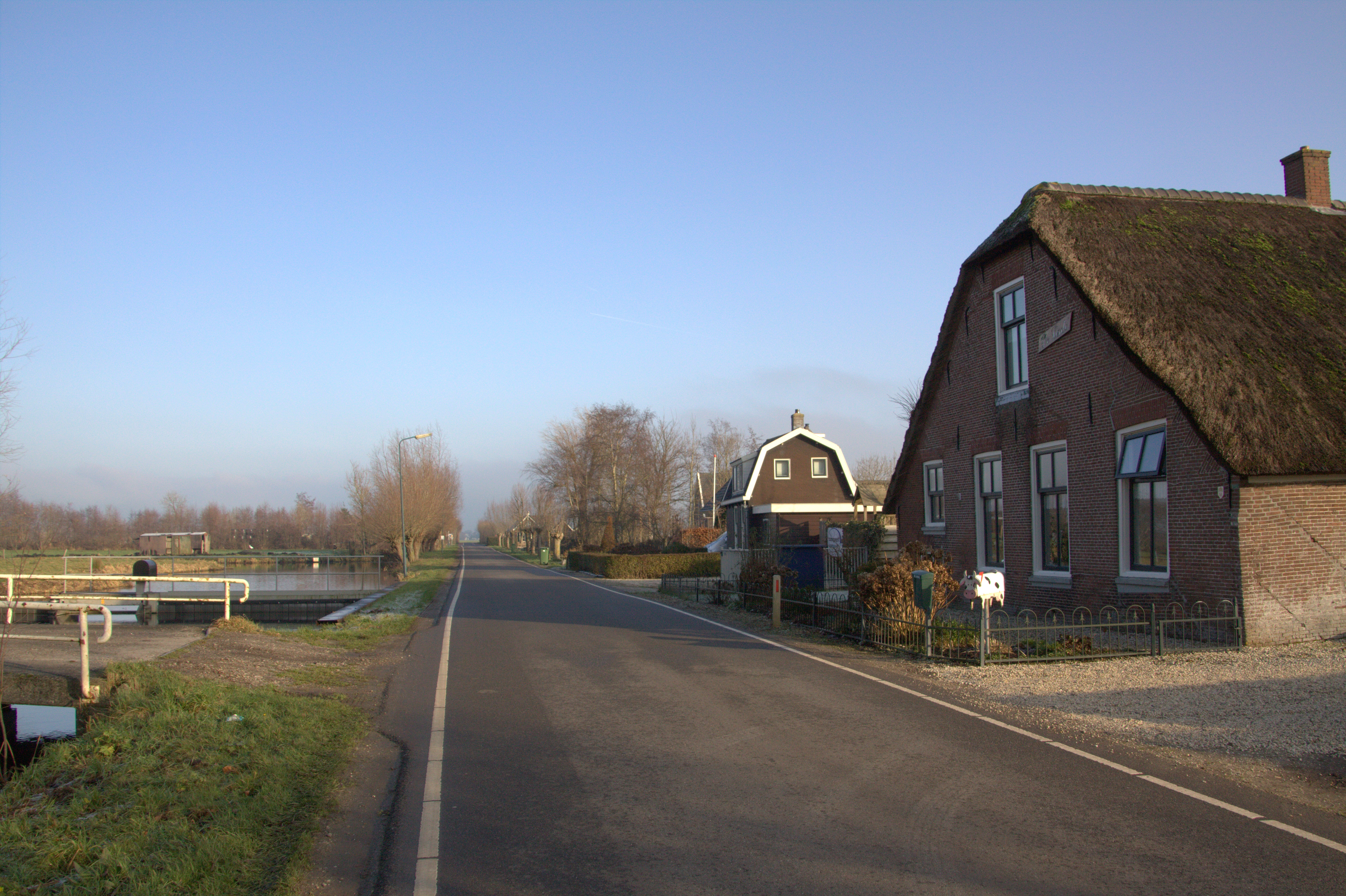
Farm "De Lente"

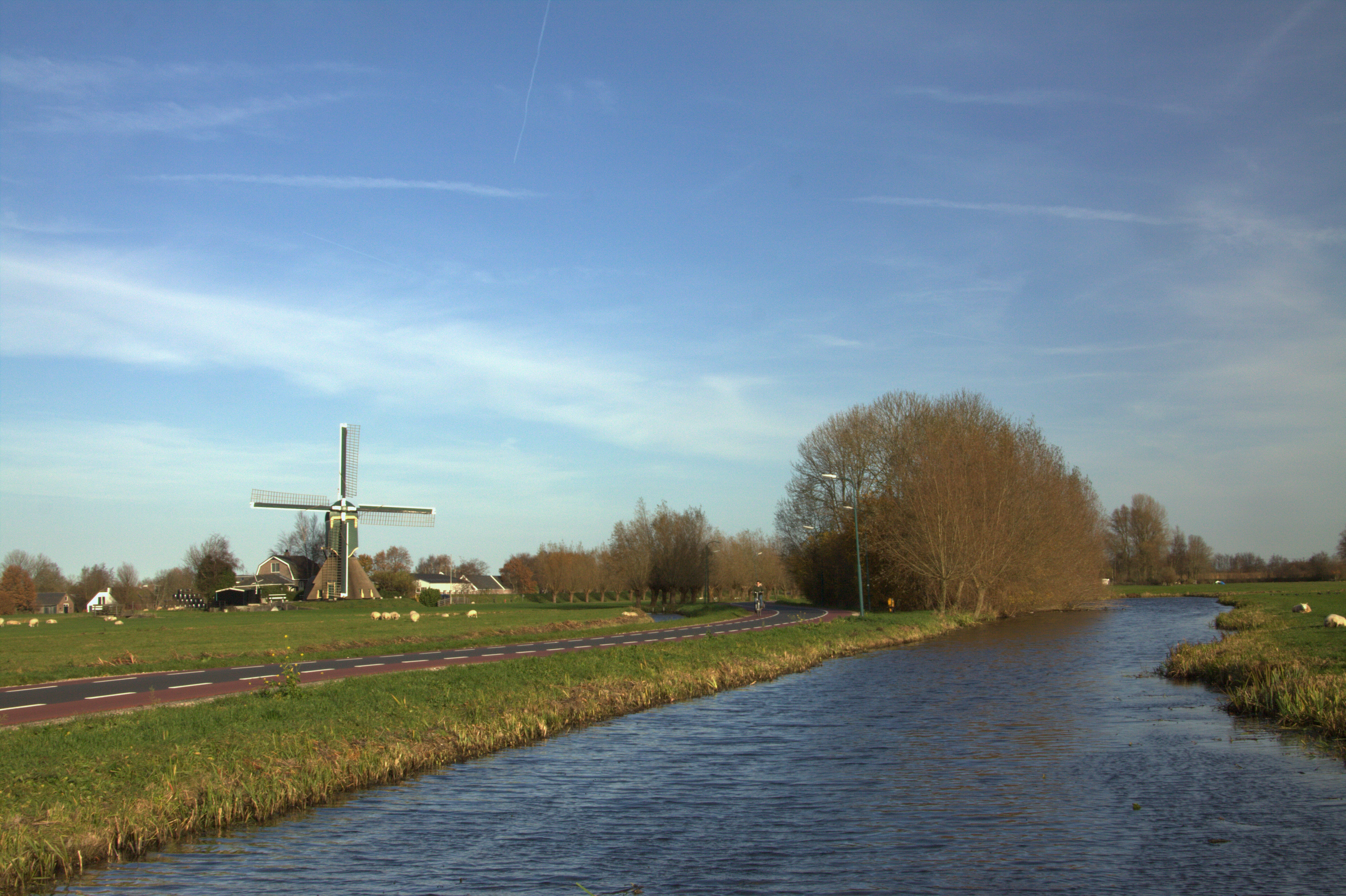
View on the windmill of Kockenge from Teckop
