= Houtdijken =

- Hamlet
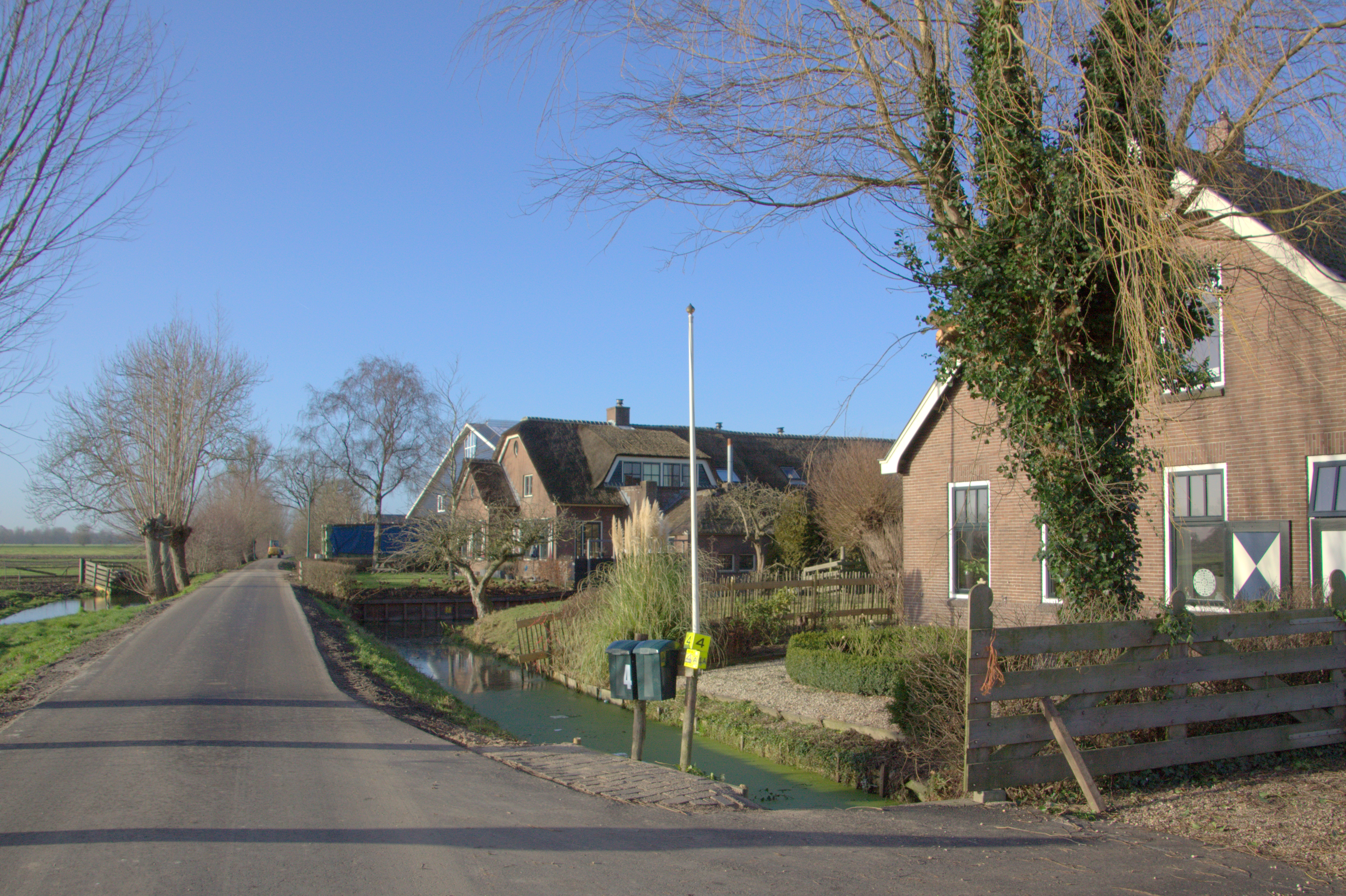
- View on Houtdijken
- Interactive map of Houtdijken
- Coordinates: 52°06′23″N 4°55′28″E
- Country: Netherlands
- Province: Utrecht
- Municipality: Woerden
- Time zone: UTC+1 (CET)
  - Summer (DST): UTC+2 (CEST)
- Postal code: 3544
- Dialing code: 0341

Houtdijken is a hamlet in the Dutch province of Utrecht. It is a part of the municipality of Woerden, and lies about 4 km northeast of Woerden.

Houtdijken is not a statistical entity, and the postal authorities have placed it under Kamerik. The hamlet was first mentioned in 1307 as In Hofdijc, and means "parcel of land on a dike". The name was later reinterpreted as hout (wood). Houtdijken has no place name signs. In 1840, it was home to 243 people. Nowadays it consists of about 20 houses including a retirement home with 12 apartments.

== Gallery ==
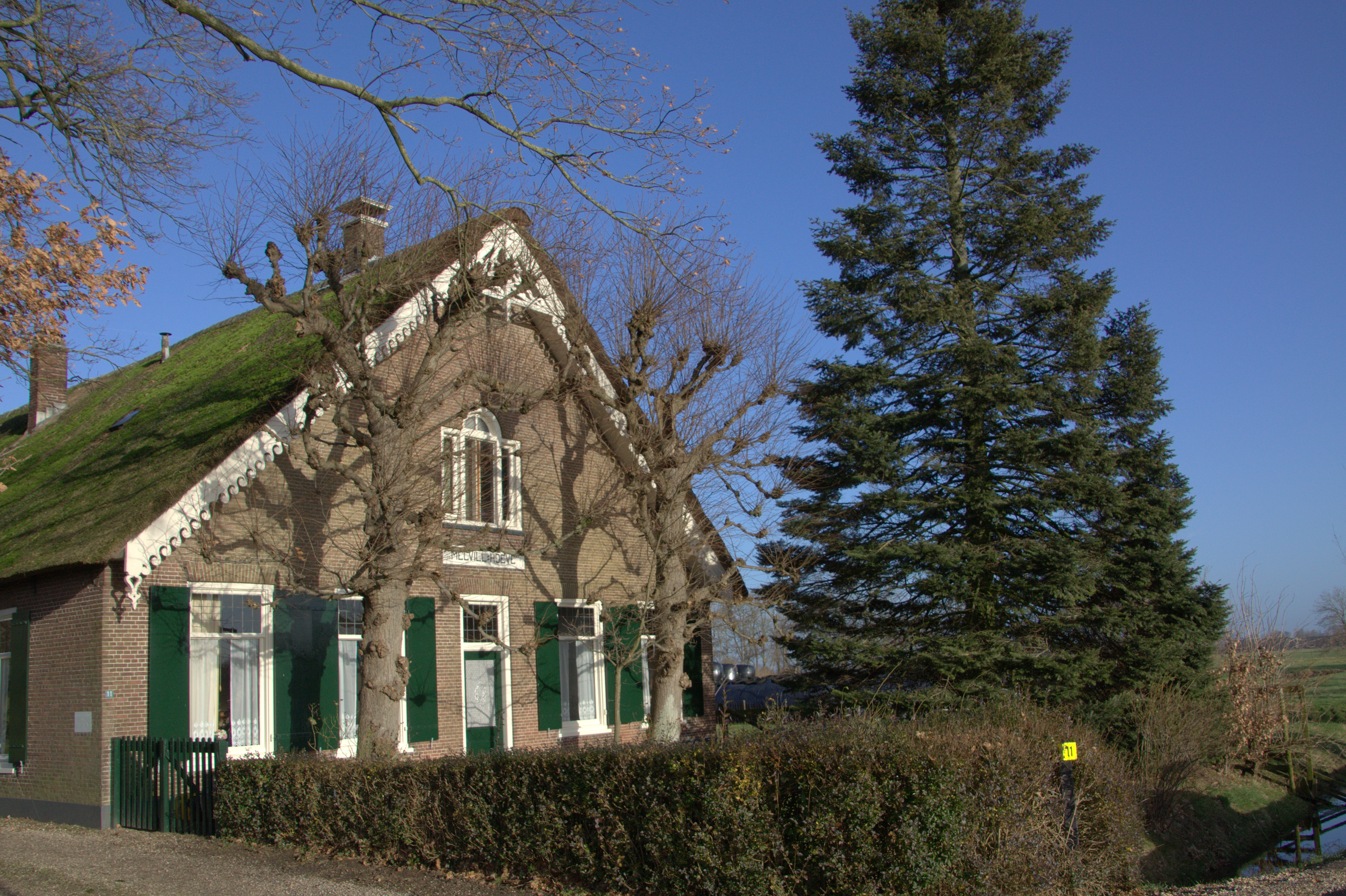
Farm in Houtdijken

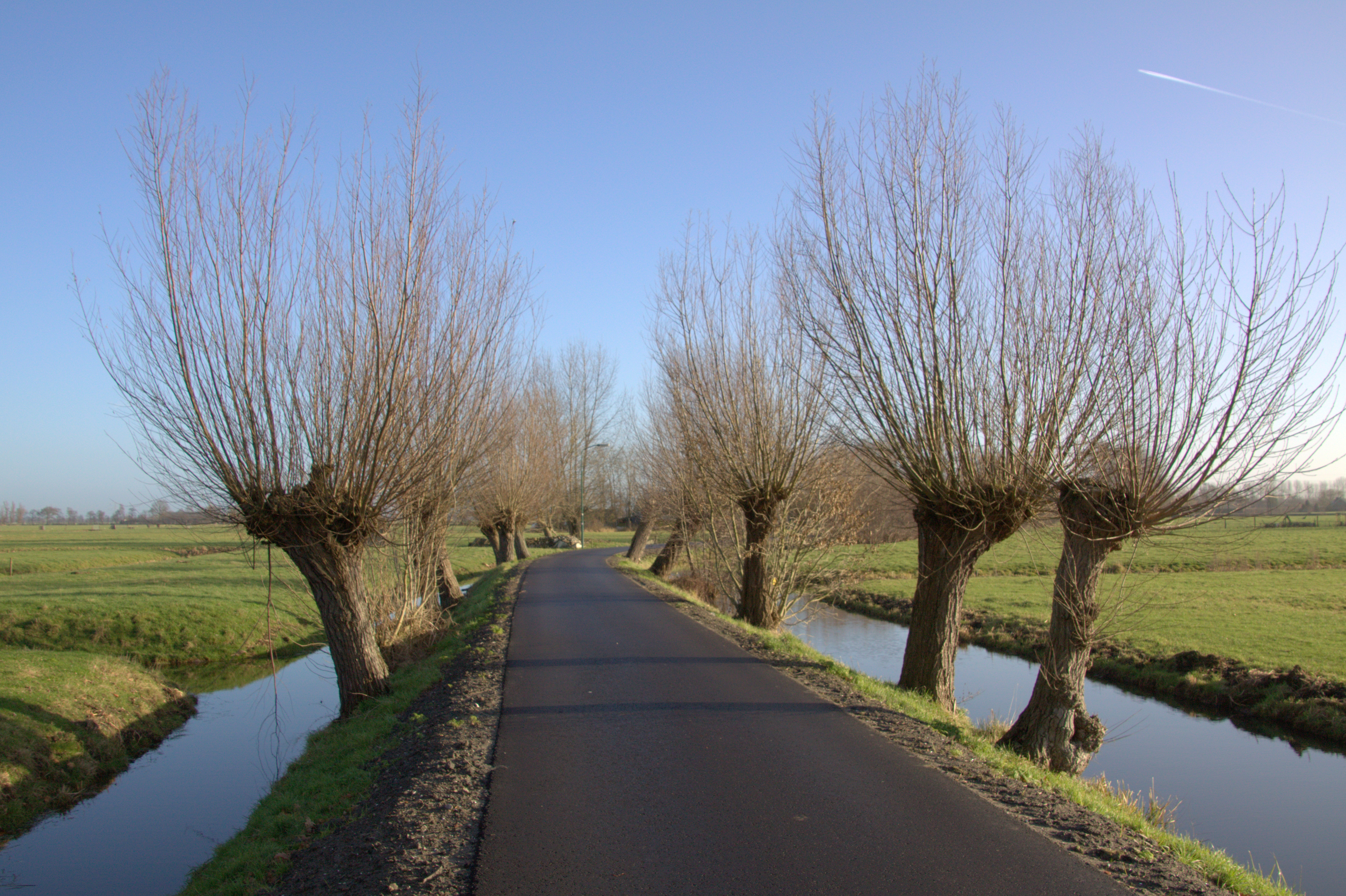
Langscape near Houtdijken
