= Oud-Kamerik =

- Hamlet
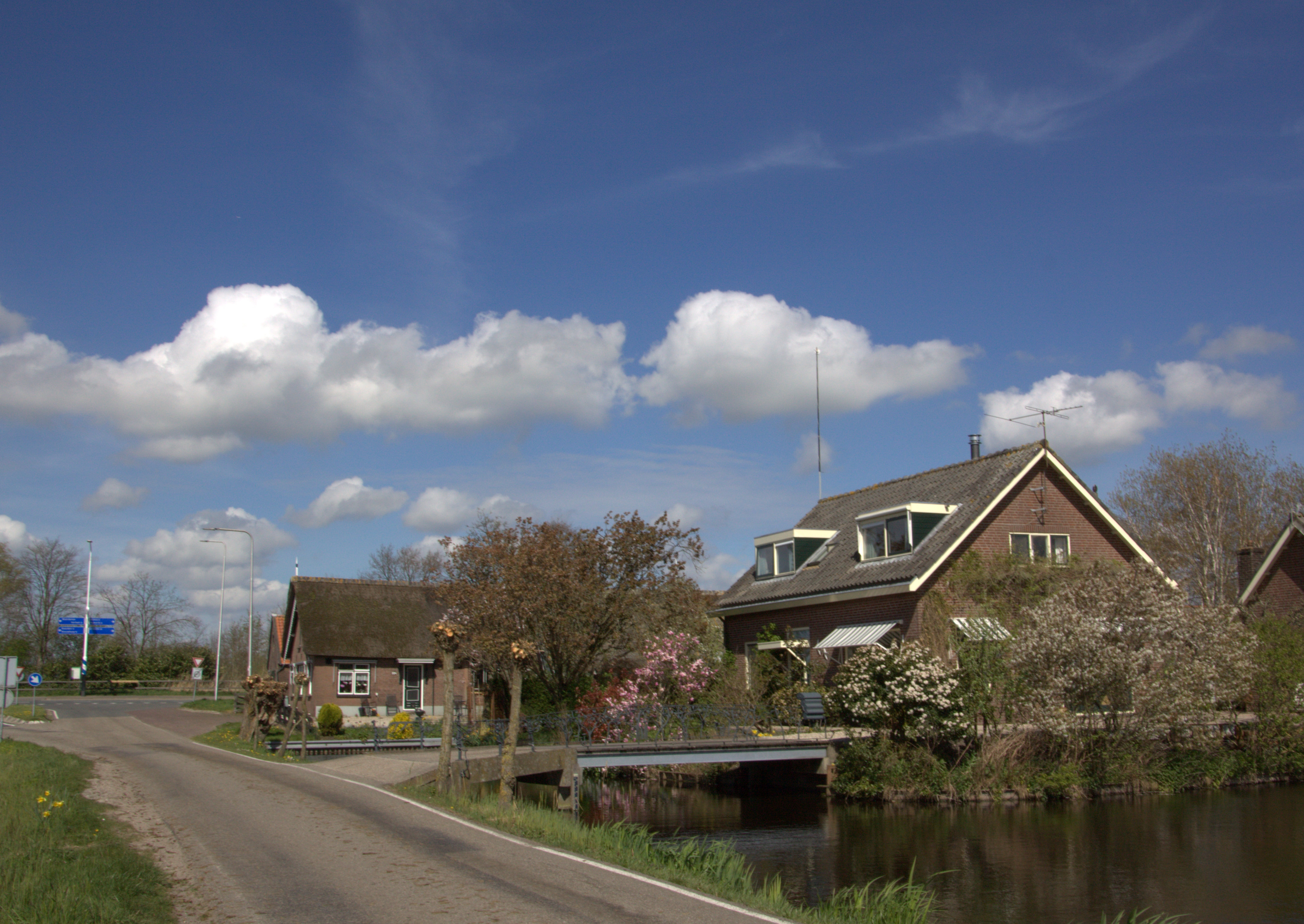

- Location in the Netherlands Oud-Kamerik (Netherlands)
- Coordinates: 52°09′18″N 4°54′07″E
- Country: Netherlands
- Province: Utrecht
- Municipality: Woerden
- Time zone: UTC+1 (CET)
  - Summer (DST): UTC+2 (CEST)
- Postal code: 3471
- Dialing code: 0348

Oud-Kamerik is a hamlet in the Dutch province of Utrecht. It is a part of the municipality of Woerden, and lies about 6 km northwest of the city of Woerden.

It consists of a number of farms in the Polder Kamerik-Teylingens, east of the villages of Kamerik and Kanis. The hamlet was first mentioned in 1296 as Oldecamerike. It uses oud (old) to distinguish from Kamerik which has been named after Cambrai in France. It is not a statistical entity, and the postal authorities have placed it under Kamerik. Oud-Kamerik has no place name signs. In 1840, it was home to 206 people. Nowadays, it consists of about 60 houses.
