= Kamerik-Mijzijde =

Mijzijde
- Hamlet
- Kamerik-Mijzijde
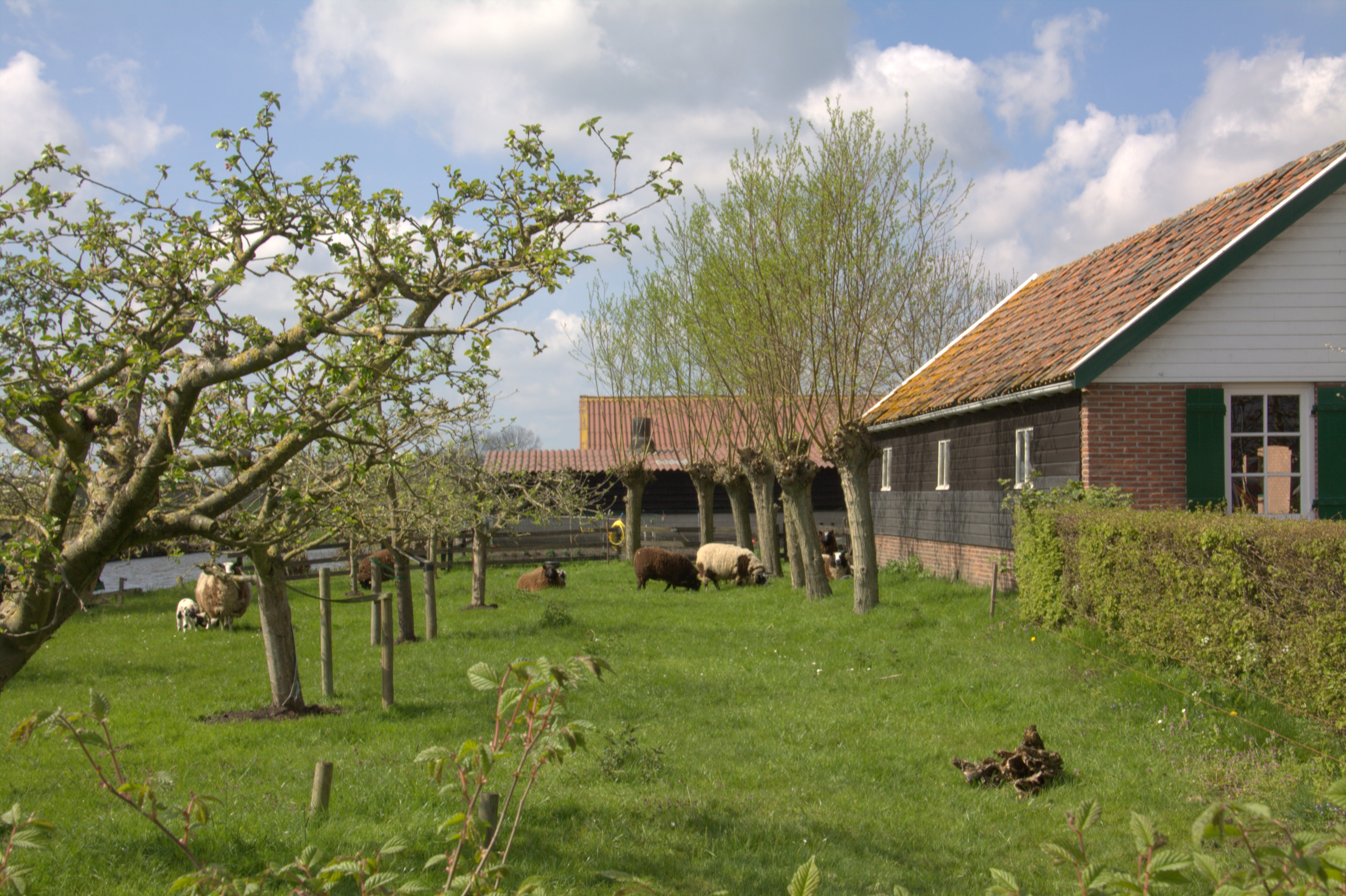
- Farm in Mijzijde

- Location in the Netherlands Mijzijde (Netherlands)
- Coordinates: 52°08′35″N 4°53′09″E
- Country: Netherlands
- Province: Utrecht
- Municipality: Woerden
- Time zone: UTC+1 (CET)
  - Summer (DST): UTC+2 (CEST)
- Postal code: 3471
- Dialing code: 0348

Kamerik-Mijzijde, also just called Mijzijde, is a hamlet in the Dutch province of Utrecht. It is a part of the municipality of Woerden, and lies about 4 km north of the city of Woerden. It consists of a number of farms some distance west from the villages of Kamerik and Kanis.

Between 1818 and 1857, Kamerik-Mijzijde was the name of a separate municipality, covering the western half of the later municipality of Kamerik.

It was first mentioned in 1427 as Camerick mitter nyezyde, and means "side of the Meye (river)". Mijzijde is not a statistical entity, and the postal authorities have placed it under Kamerik. Mijzijde has no place name signs and contains about 60 houses.

== Gallery ==
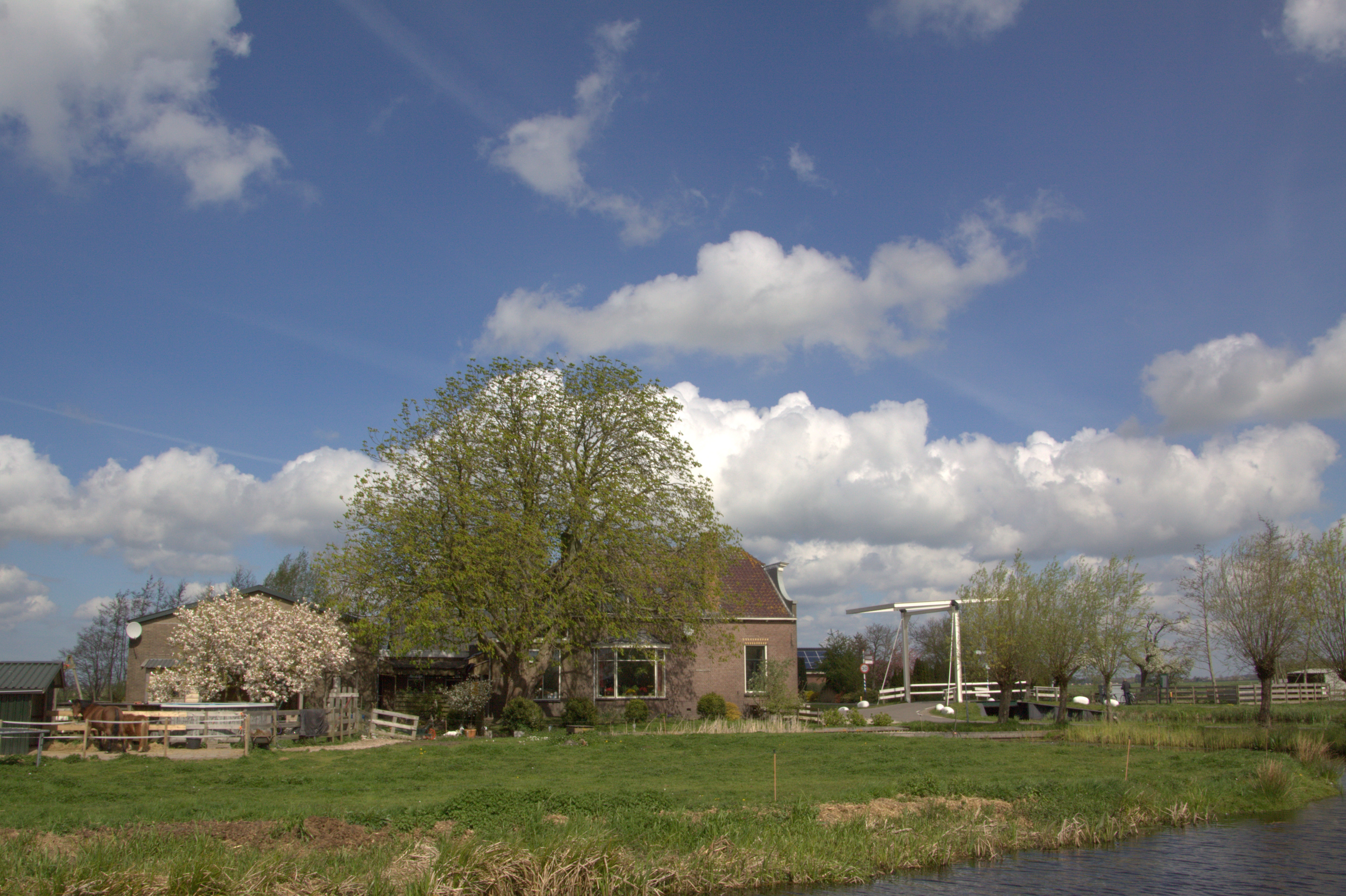
View on the bridge

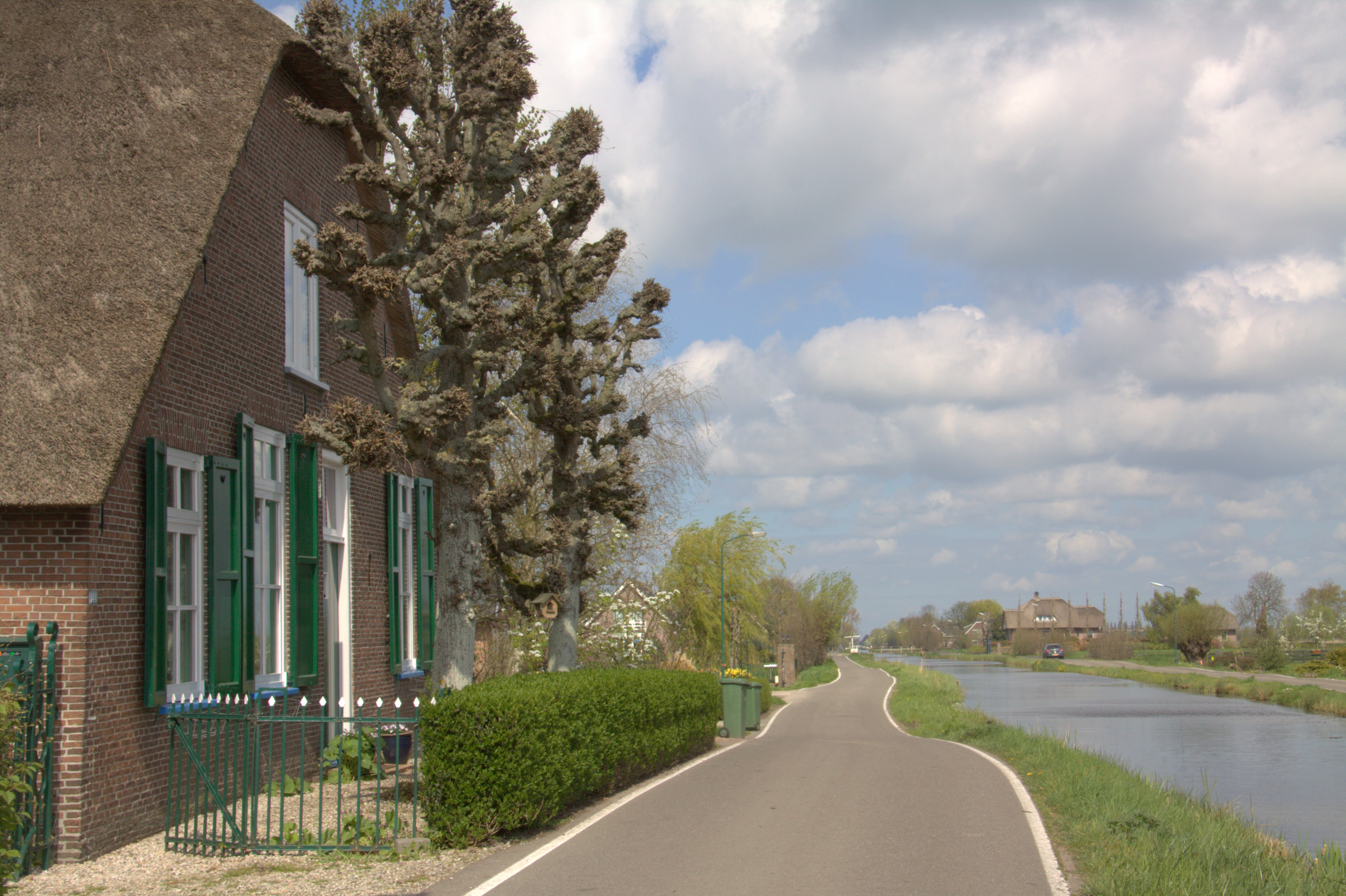
Street view
