= Kamerik =

- Town
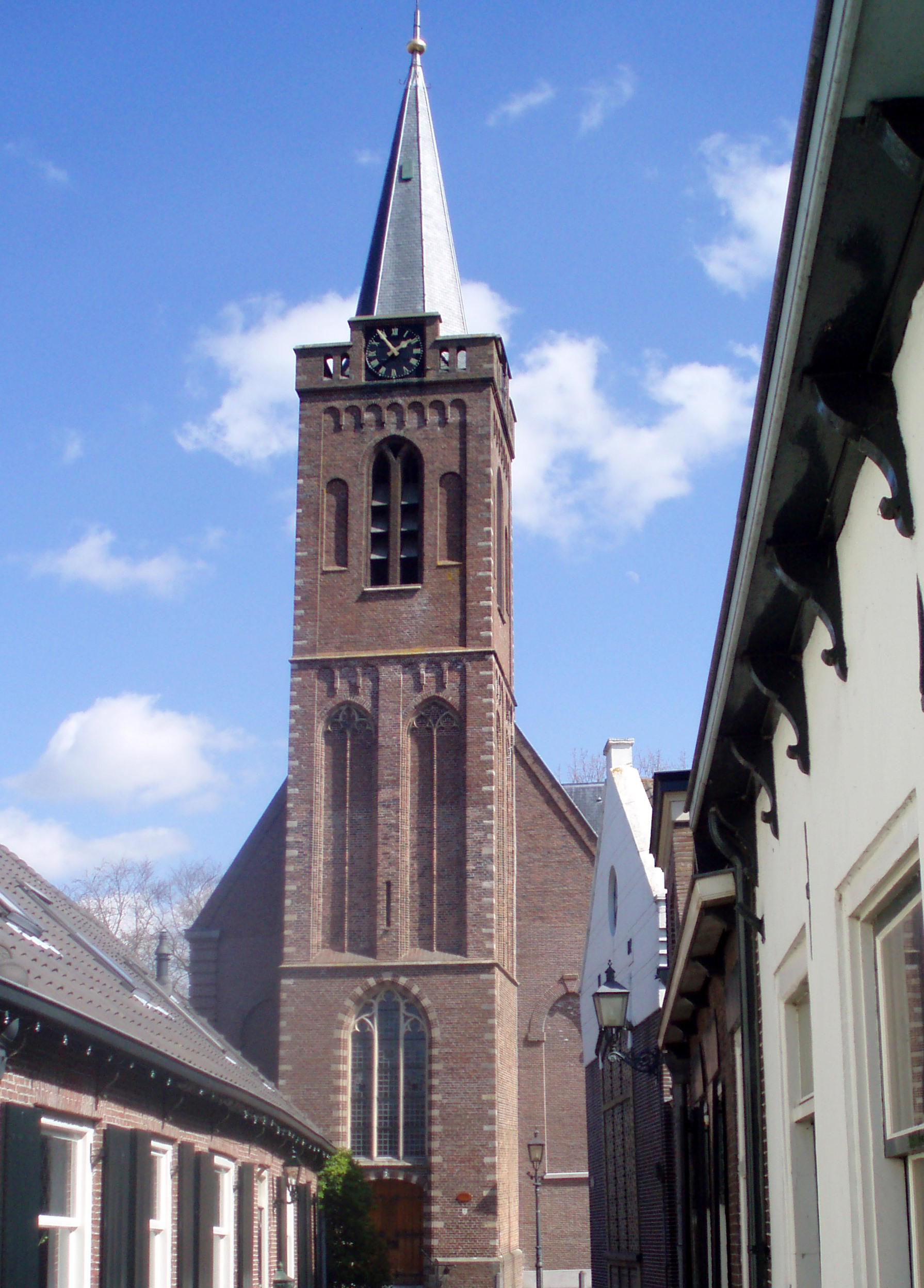

- Flag Coat of arms

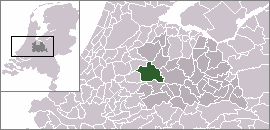

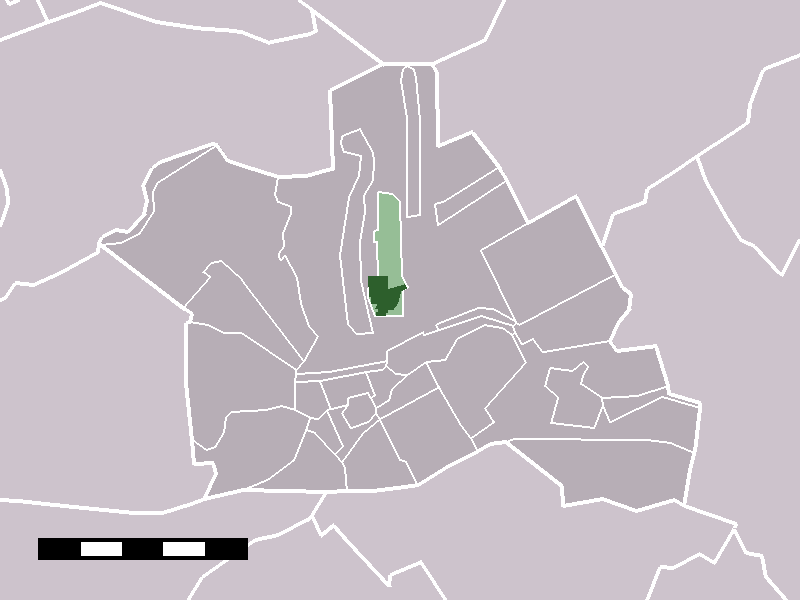
- The village of Kamerik (dark green) and the statistical district "Kamerik and Kanis" (light green) in the municipality of Woerden.
- Coordinates: 52°6′39″N 4°53′34″E
- Country: Netherlands
- Province: Utrecht
- Municipality: Woerden

Population (1 January 2010)
  - Total: 3,808
- Time zone: UTC+1 (CET)
  - Summer (DST): UTC+2 (CEST)

Kamerik is a village in the Dutch province of Utrecht. It is a part of the municipality of Woerden and is situated about 3 km north of Woerden.

In 2010 the village of Kamerik (including Kanis) had 3808 inhabitants. The built-up area of the town was 0.43 km² and contained 877 residences. The statistical district "Kamerik and Kanis", which includes two villages and the surrounding countryside, has a population of around 3050. This does not include the separate villages of Kamerik-Mijzijde and Oud-Kamerik.

Until it was merged with Woerden in 1989 Kamerik was a separate municipality. Between 1818 and 1857 it was split into two municipalities: Kamerik-Mijzijde on the west side, and Kamerik-Houtdijken on the east.
