= Kanis =

- Village
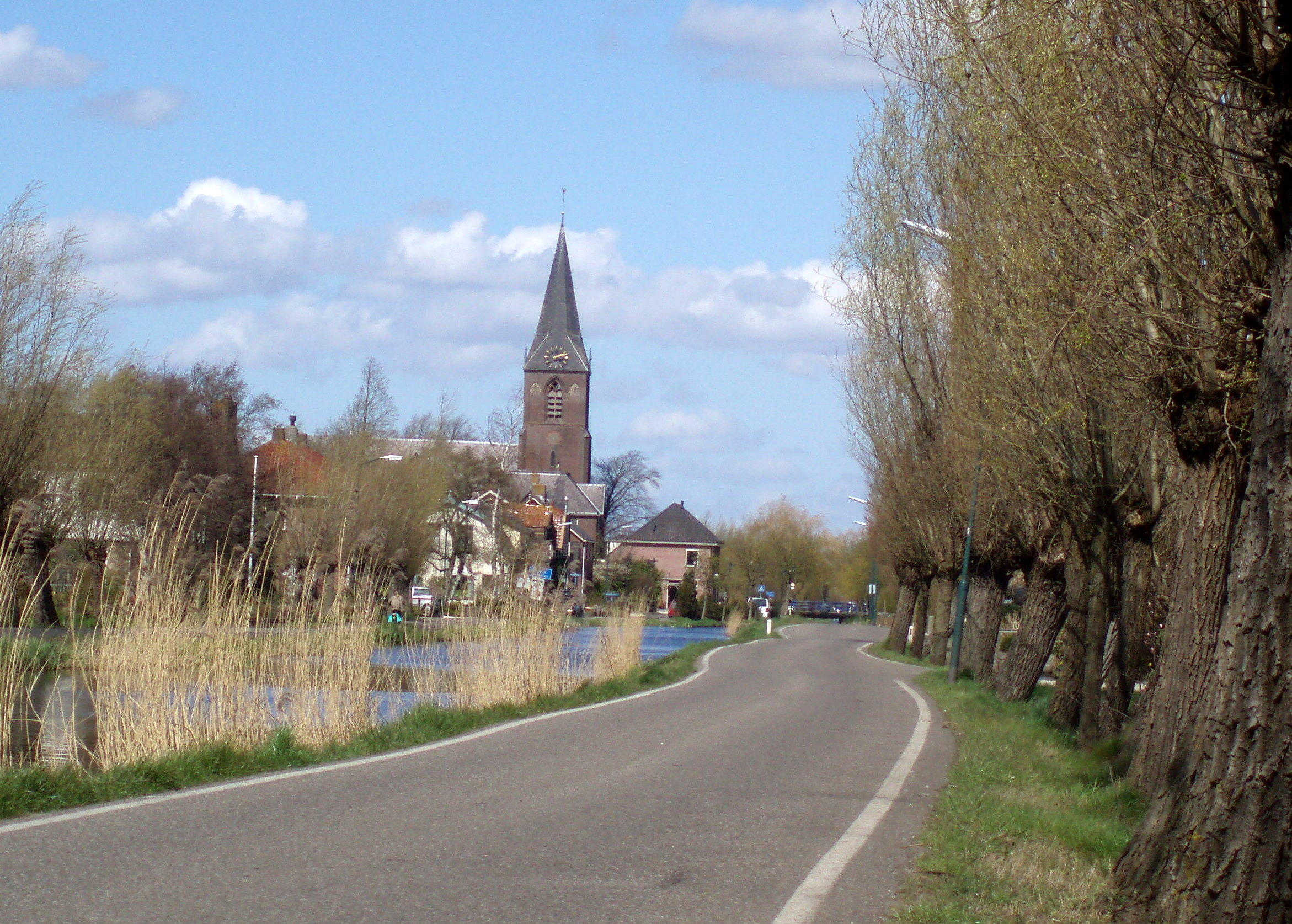

- Location in the Netherlands Kanis (Netherlands)
- Coordinates: 52°7′29″N 4°53′30″E
- Country: Netherlands
- Province: Utrecht (province)
- Municipality: Woerden

Area
  - Total: 0.11 km^{2} (0.042 sq mi)

Population (2021)
  - Total: 430
  - Density: 3,900/km^{2} (10,000/sq mi)
- Time zone: UTC+1 (CET)
  - Summer (DST): UTC+2 (CEST)
- Postal code: 3471
- Dialing code: 0348

Kanis is a village in the Dutch province of Utrecht. It is a part of the municipality of Woerden, and lies about 4 km north of Woerden.

The hamlet was first mentioned between 1839 and 1859 as "de Verkeerde Kanis herbg", and was the name of an inn. Kanis means basket with fish. There is still a restaurant called De Kanis in the village, but it is not clear whether it is related to the original inn. In 1855, a Roman Catholic church was built in the village.

== Gallery ==
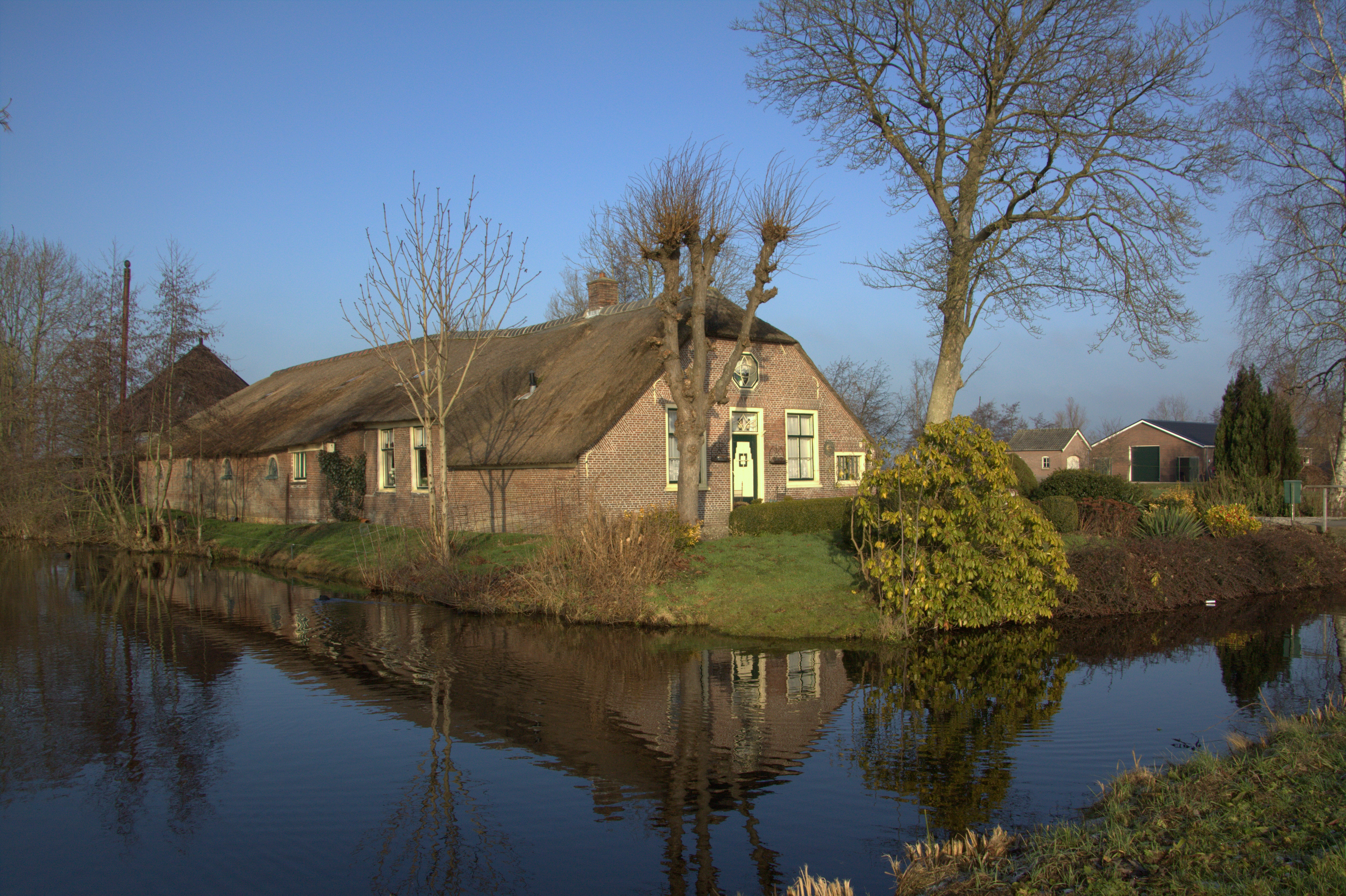
Farm in Kanis

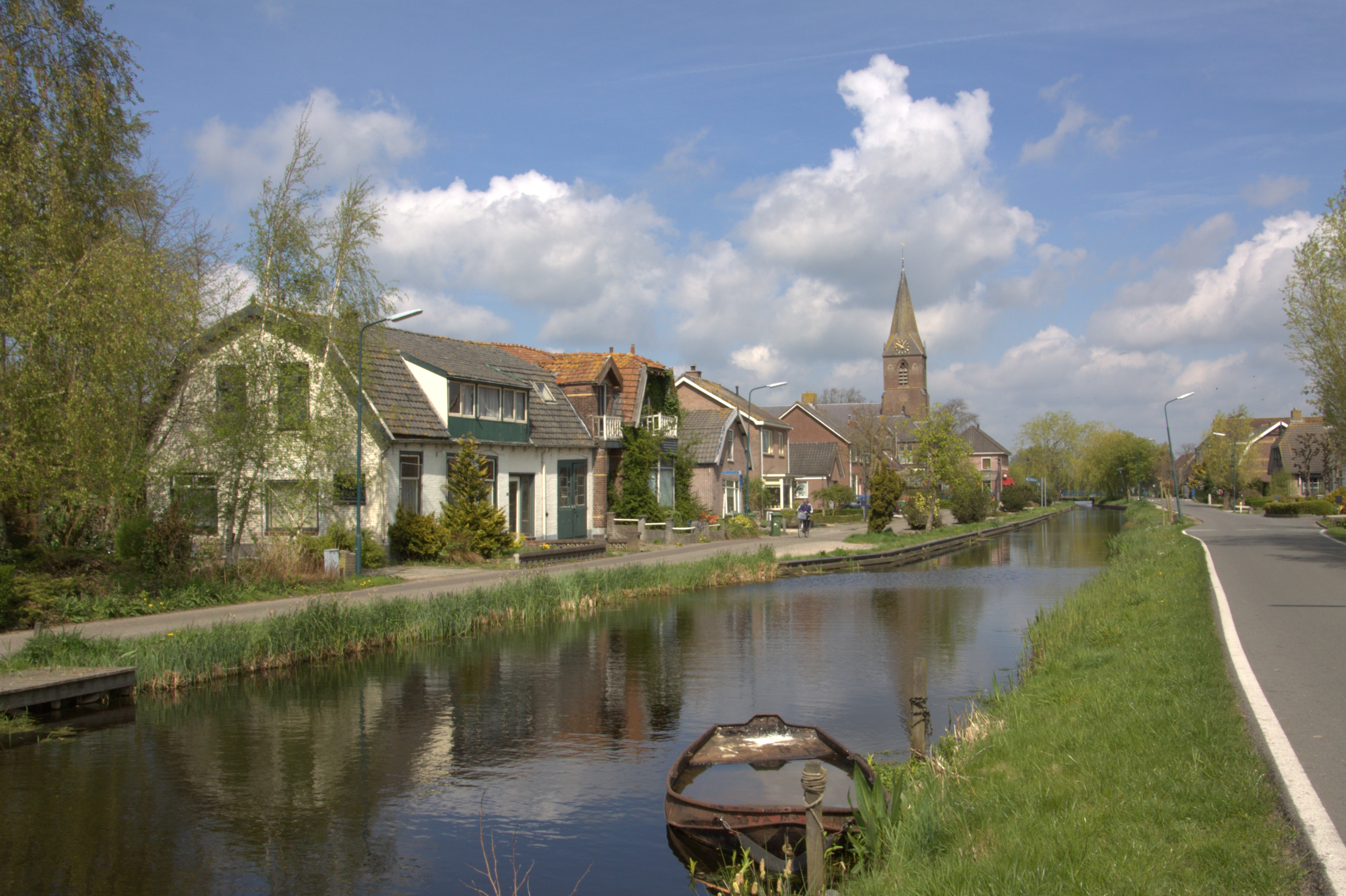
Street view

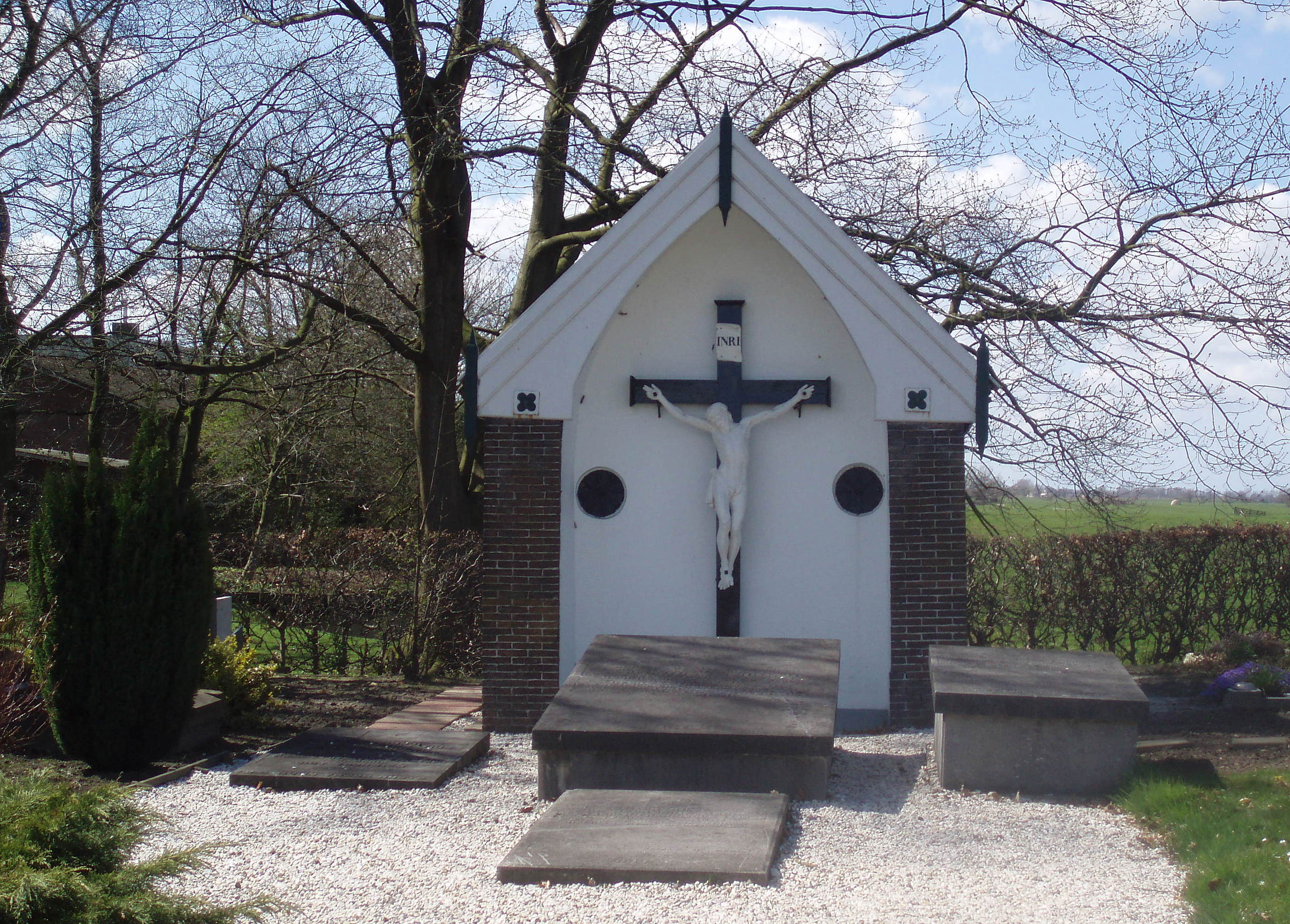
Crucifix on the cemetery

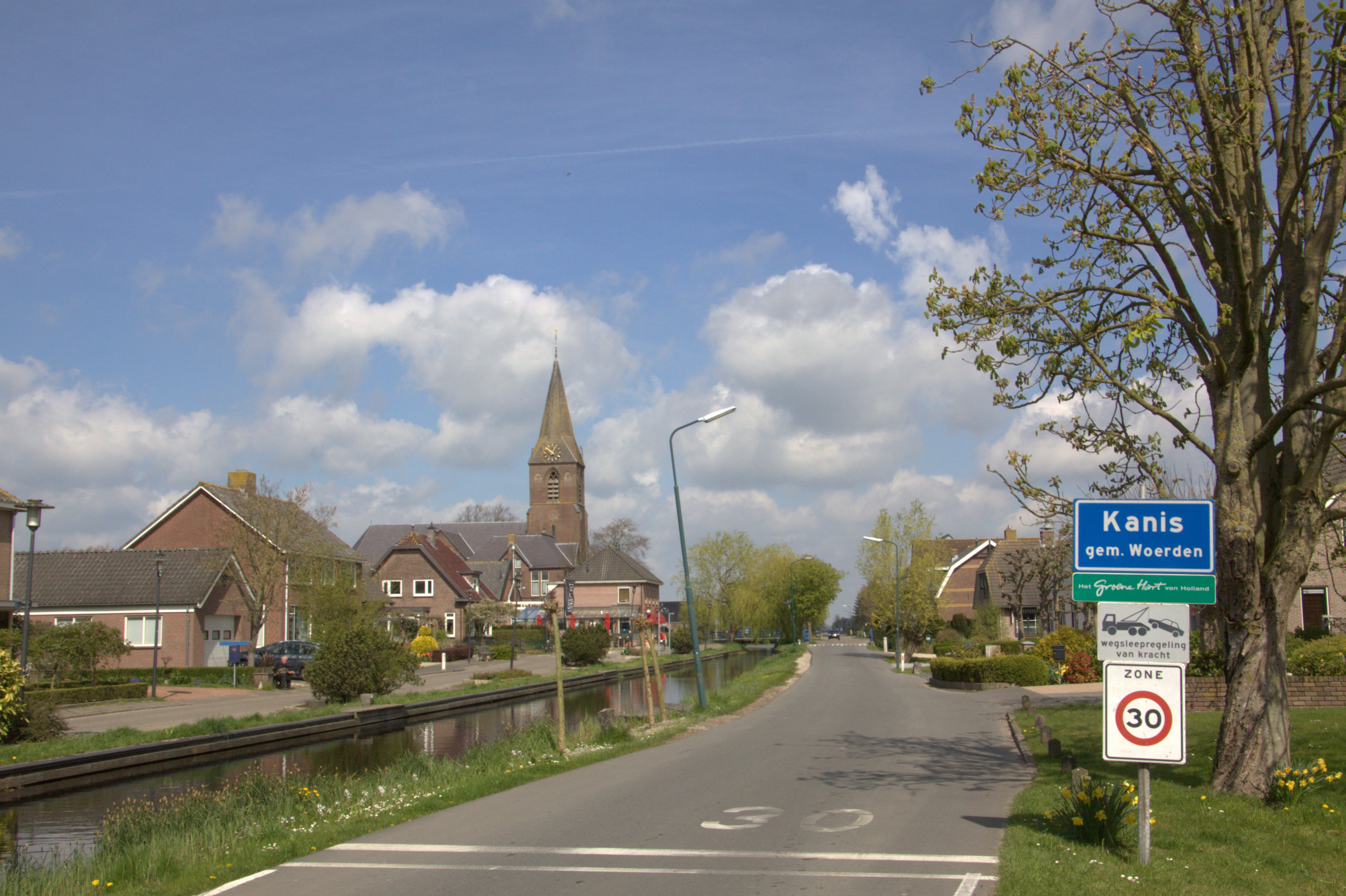
Welcome to Kanis
