= Linschoten =

Linschoten may refer to:

- Lange Linschoten, a town in Utrecht, Netherlands
- Linschoten (village), in Utrecht, Netherlands
- Linschoten (river), in Utrecht, Netherlands
- Linschoten (surname)
