= Oudewater =

- Municipality
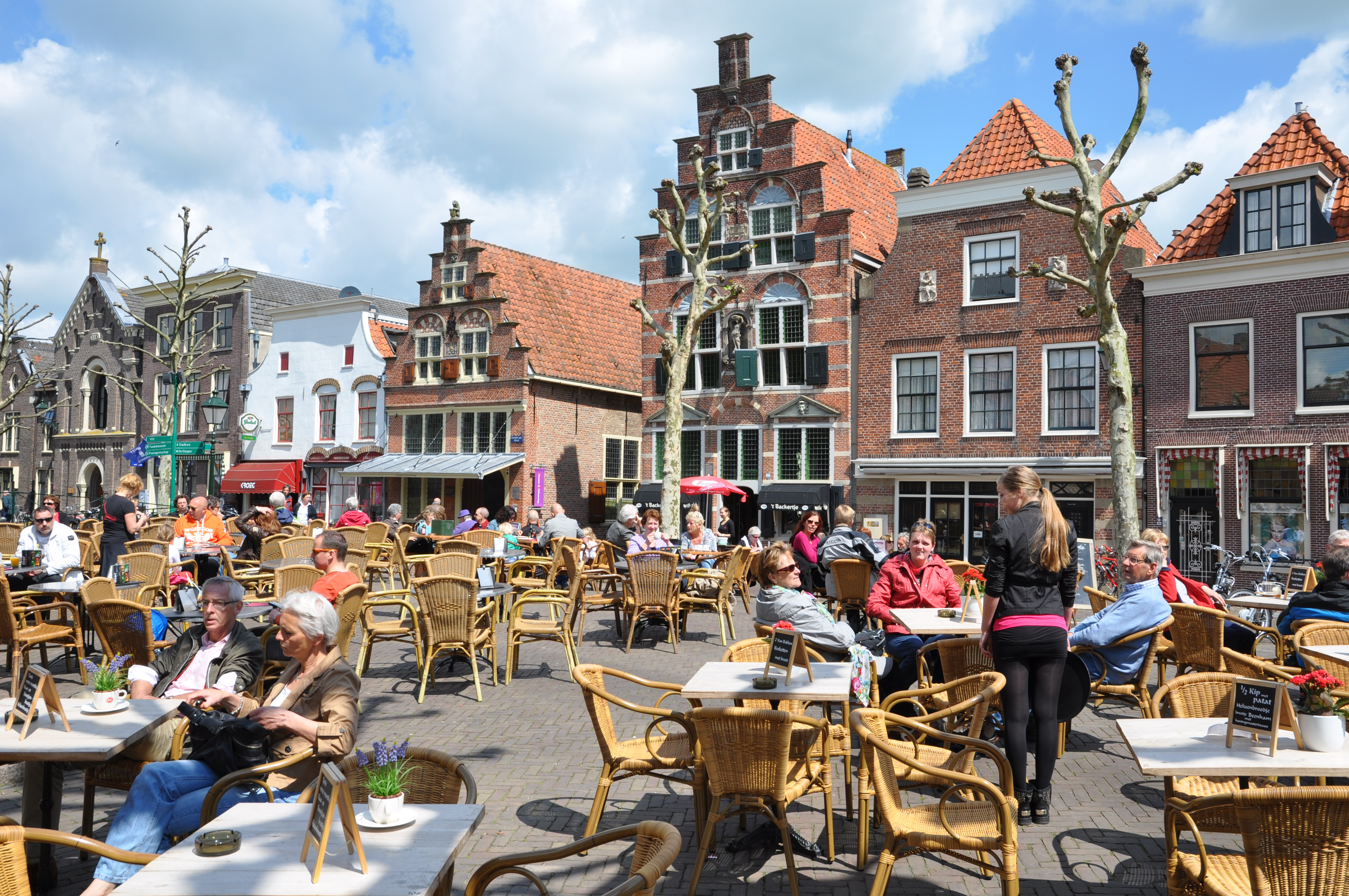
- Oudewater town centre

- Flag Coat of arms

- Location in Utrecht
- Coordinates: 52°1′N 4°52′E
- Country: Netherlands
- Province: Utrecht

Government
  - Body: Municipal council
  - Mayor: Danny de Vries (CDA)

Area
  - Total: 40.10 km^{2} (15.48 sq mi)
  - Land: 38.90 km^{2} (15.02 sq mi)
  - Water: 1.20 km^{2} (0.46 sq mi)
- Elevation: 2 m (6.6 ft)

Population (January 2021)
  - Total: 10,138
  - Density: 261/km^{2} (680/sq mi)
- Time zone: UTC+1 (CET)
  - Summer (DST): UTC+2 (CEST)
- Postcode: 3420–3425
- Area code: 0348
- Website: www.oudewater.nl

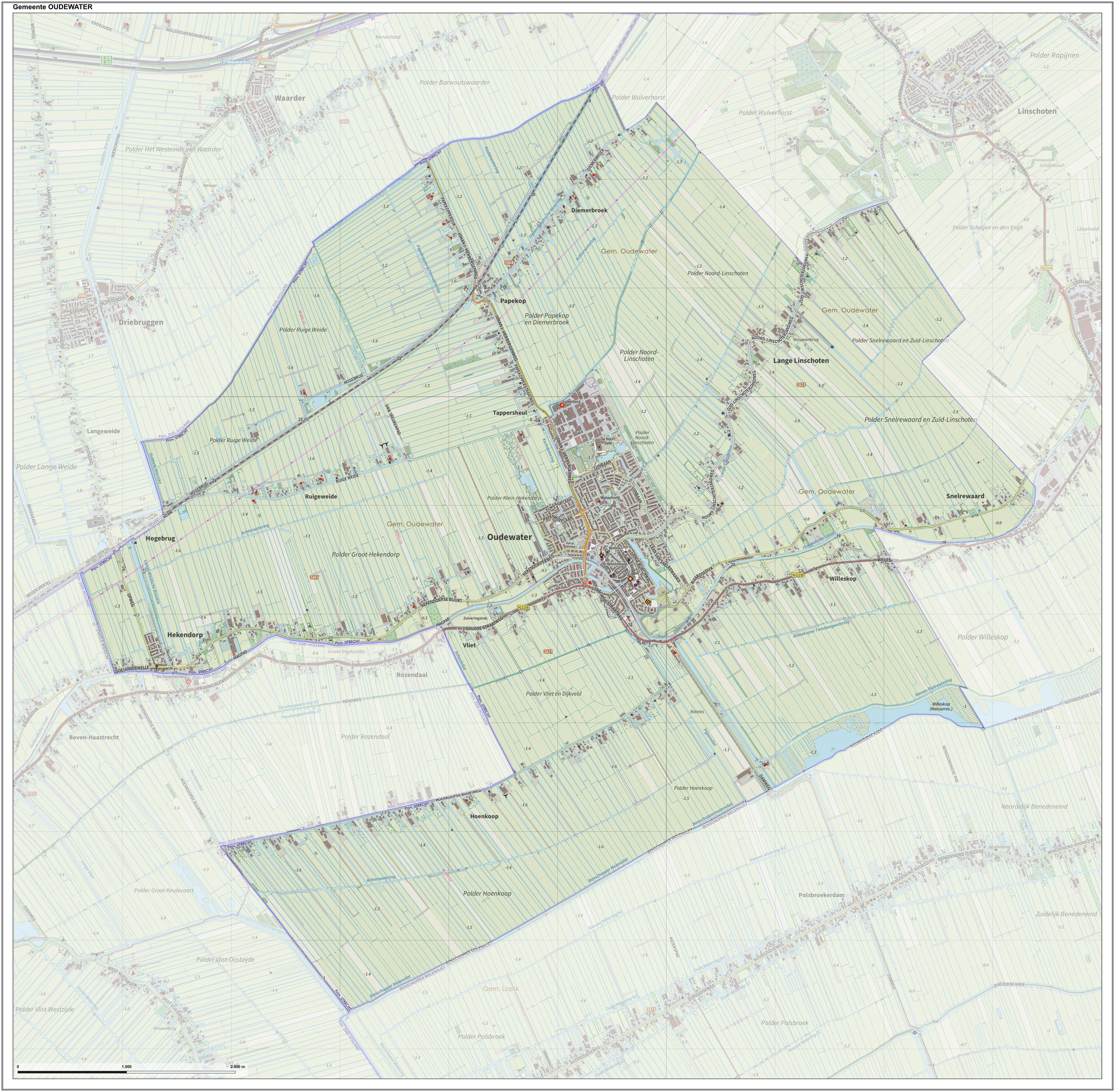
Map of the municipality of Oudewater, June 2015

Oudewater (Dutch pronunciation: [ˈʌudəˌʋaːtər]) is a municipality and a city in the Netherlands.

== History ==
The origin of the town of Oudewater is obscure and no information has been found concerning the first settlement of citizens. It is also difficult to recover the name of Oudewater. One explanation is that the name is a corruption of old water-meadow. Oudewater was an important border city between Holland and Utrecht. Oudewater (lit. "Old water") was of great strategic importance.

The town was granted city rights in 1265 by Hendrik van Vianden, the bishop of Utrecht.

Oudewater took its place in the First Free States council in Dordrecht on 19 July 1572, Oudewater was one of the twelve cities taking part in the first free convention of the States General in Dordrecht. This was a meeting that laid down the origin of the State of the Netherlands, as we know it now, under the leadership of the House of Orange. This happened at the beginning of the Eighty Years' War (1568–1648) when the Netherlands were still part of the Spanish Empire. After a Siege of Oudewater, the city was conquered by the Spanish on 7 August 1575, and most of its inhabitants were killed, including the family of famous Oudewater native and Protestant theologian Jacobus Arminius (1560–1609).

In the 16th and 17th century, Oudewater was an important producer of rope. In the surrounding area, hemp was cultivated. There still is a rope manufacturing plant and a rope museum in the town.

In 1970 the municipality of Oudewater moved from the province of South Holland to the province of Utrecht.

== Geography ==
Oudewater is located at 52°1′N 4°52′E in the southwest of the province of Utrecht in the center of the Netherlands. It is situated where the Linschoten river flows out in the Hollandse IJssel.

Oudewater is bordered by the municipalities of Montfoort (in the northeast), Lopik (southeast), Krimpenerwaard (southwest), and Bodegraven-Reeuwijk (northwest).

The municipality of Oudewater consists of the following cities, towns, villages and/or districts: Diemerbroek, Hekendorp, Hoenkoop, Lange Linschoten, Oudewater, Papekop, Ruigeweide, and Snelrewaard.

== Buildings ==
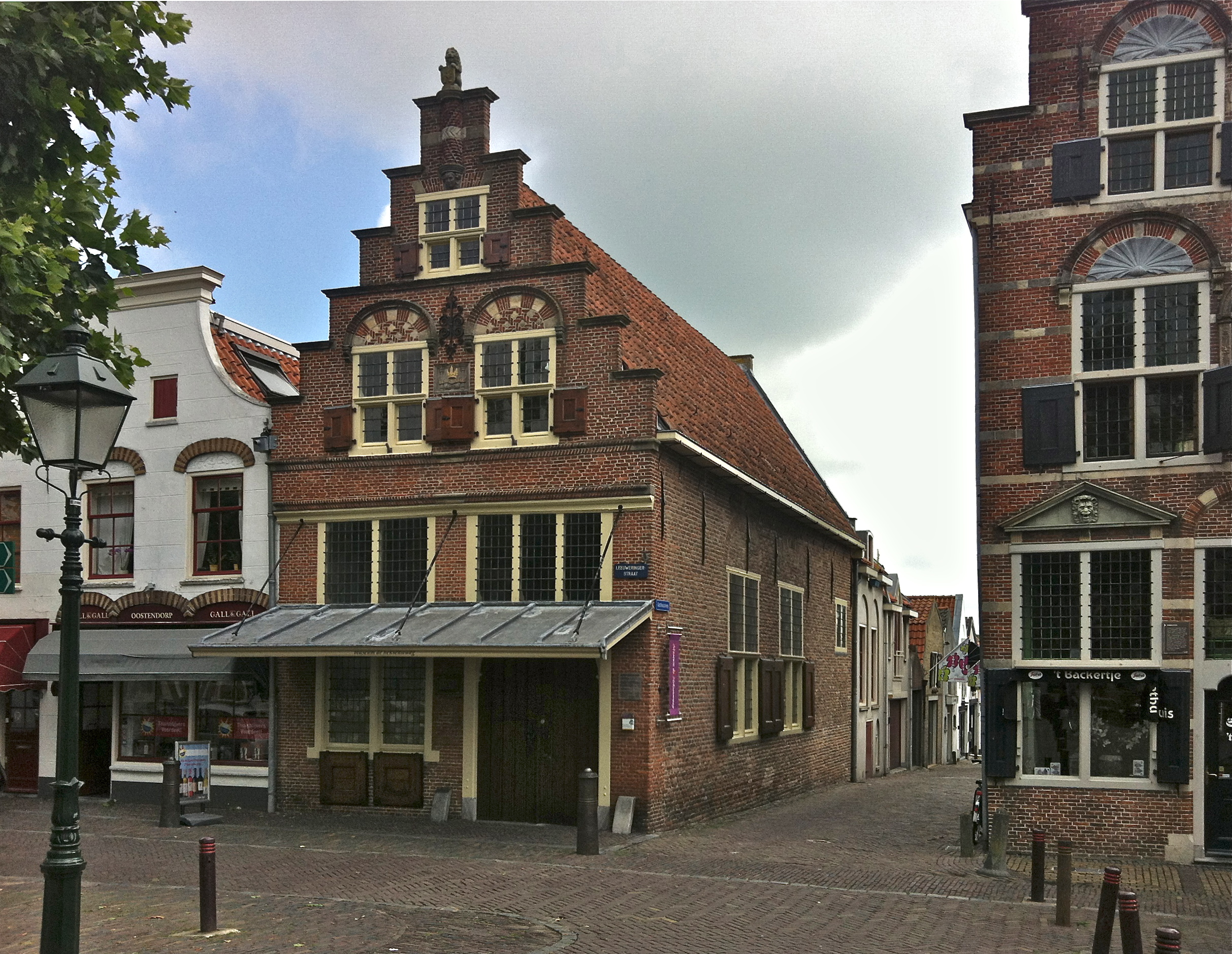
The weigh house in 2012

Oudewater is famous for the Heksenwaag (Witches' scales). The weighing house, an official town building, became famous at the height of the European witch trials of the 16th century because people accused of witchcraft were offered a fair chance to prove their innocence, unlike in many other places, where the scales were rigged.

From all over Europe, people made the journey to Oudewater to avoid prosecution. After the weighing, they received an official certificate proclaiming them not a witch. Nobody was ever found to be an actual witch in Oudewater, though the weighings were still a public spectacle. Certificates would state that "the body weight is in proportion to its build". The reasoning behind this is the old belief that a witch has no soul and therefore weighs significantly less than an ordinary person; this distinction would supposedly allow the witch to fly on a broomstick.

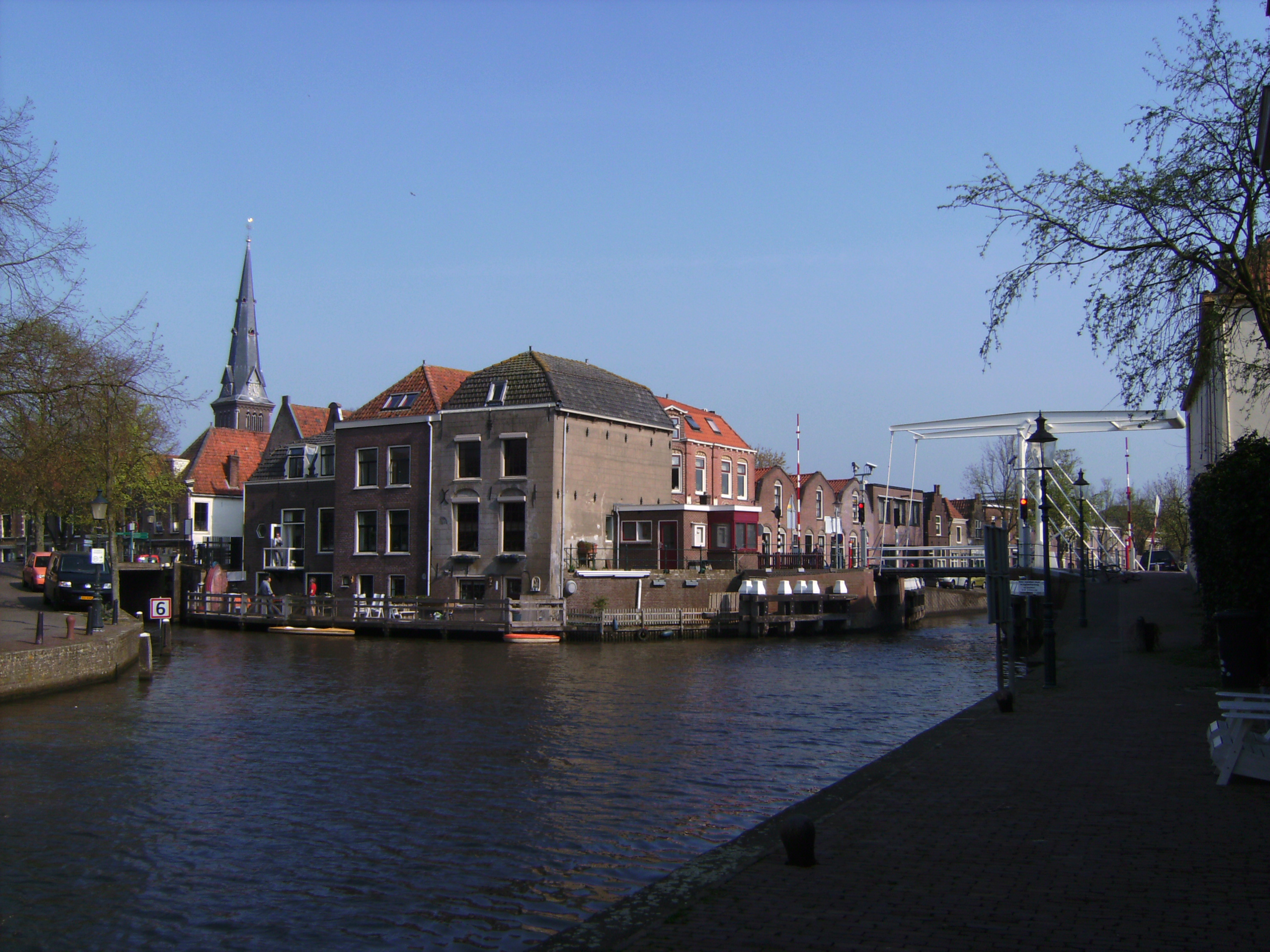
View to the town

The weighings can be seen as a sign of the growing power of the citizenry as a third force next to that of the church and nobility. In giving out these certificates, the citizens of Oudewater, therefore, were defying the church.

The Waag is still open as a tourist attraction, and official certificates are available.

The town hall dates from 1588 and features a stork's nest. Oudewater has a monumental protected city centre with more than 250 protected houses. The church, now Protestant, dates from the 15th century. Its tower is from about 1300. During the religious wars, until the sacking of Oudewater, both Roman Catholics and Protestants used this church. Thereafter Catholics were still tolerated (the Spanish occupiers being Catholic) but more in low profile.

== In fiction ==
Oudewater is the setting for the 1975 novel Das Geheimnis des Baron Oudewater set in the 16th century, when the Netherlands was fighting for its independence from Spain. Written by the German author Alberta Rommel, it has been described as a romantic historical novel.

The 2014 film Reckless was filmed in Oudewater.

== Notable people ==
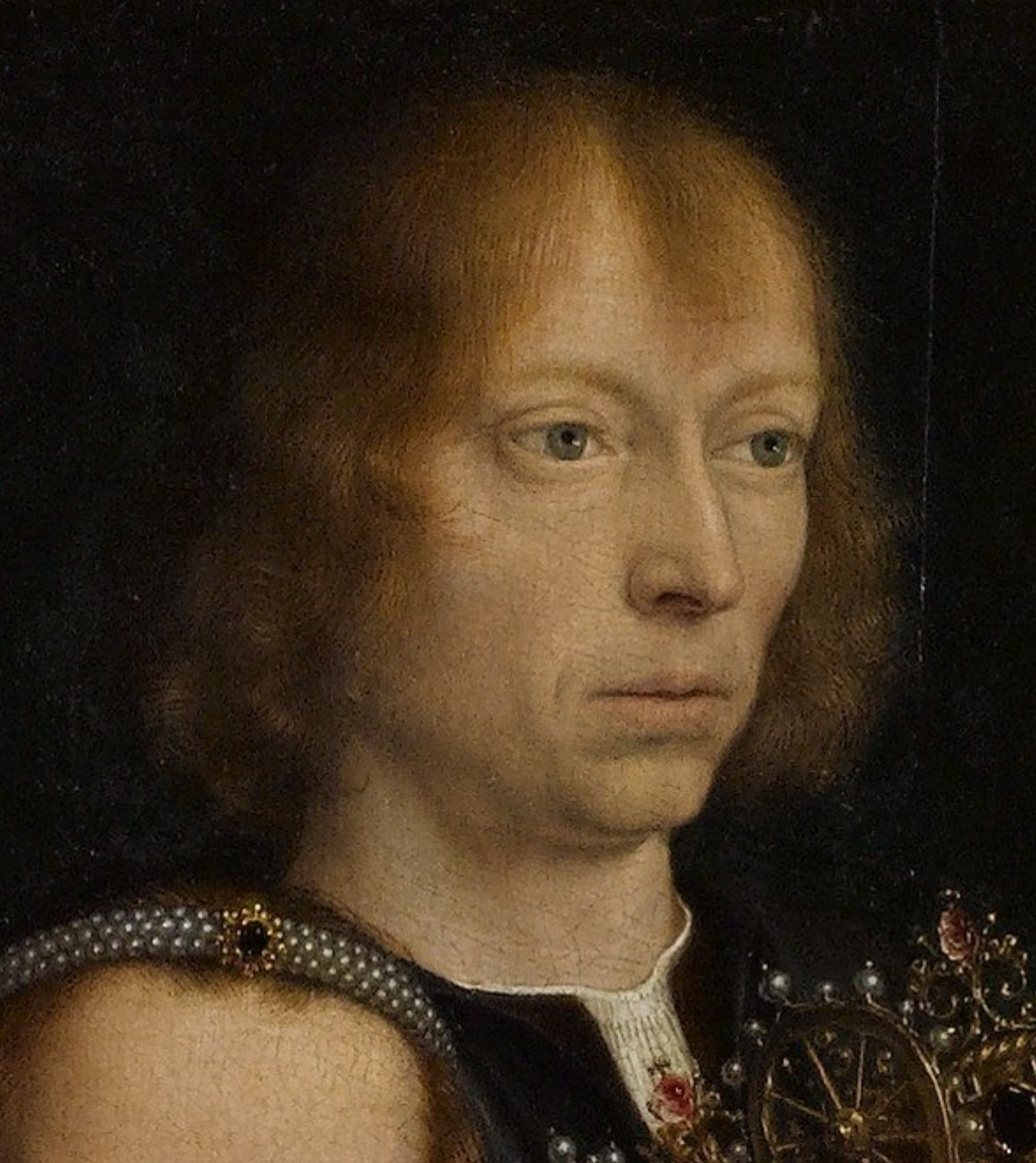
Gerard David, self-portrait, 1509

- Albert van Ouwater (ca.1410/1415 – 1475) an early artist of Early Netherlandish painting working in the Northern Netherlands
- Gerard David (ca.1460–1523) an Early Netherlandish painter and manuscript illuminator, used brilliant colour
- Rudolph Snellius (1546–1613) a Dutch linguist and mathematician, a political and intellectual force of the Dutch Golden Age
- Jacobus Arminius (1560–1609) a Dutch theologian, formed Arminianism and the Dutch Remonstrant movement
- Hendrikus Albertus Lorentz (1871–1944) a Dutch explorer in New Guinea and diplomat in South Africa
- Jan Montyn (1924–2015) a Dutch artist, specialized in etching
- Wim Klever (born 1930 in Snelrewaard) a Dutch scholar of the Jewish Dutch philosopher Baruch Spinoza
- Dirk de Ridder (born 1972) a sailor, competed at the 2000 Summer Olympics

== Image gallery ==
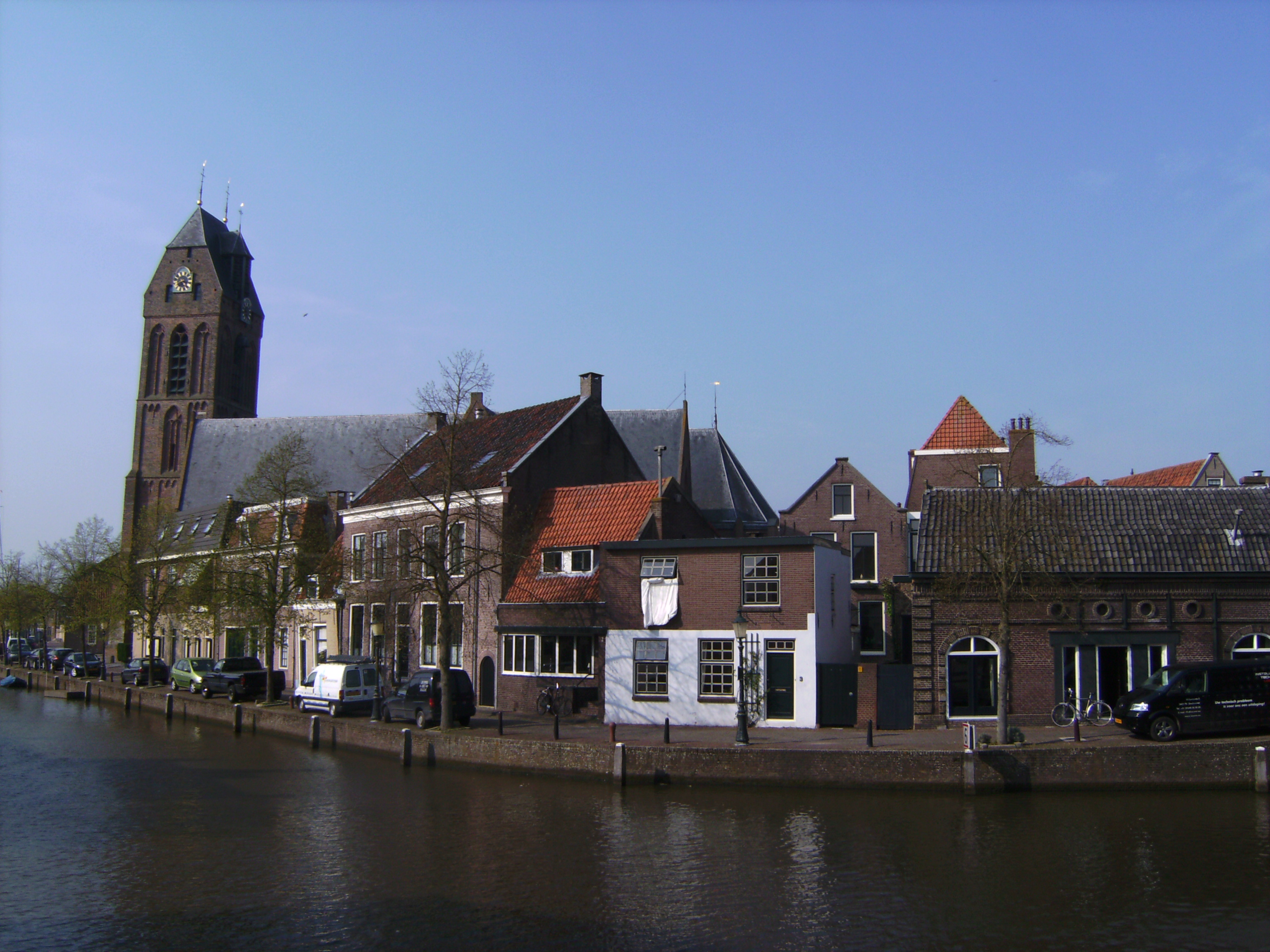
Church near a canal

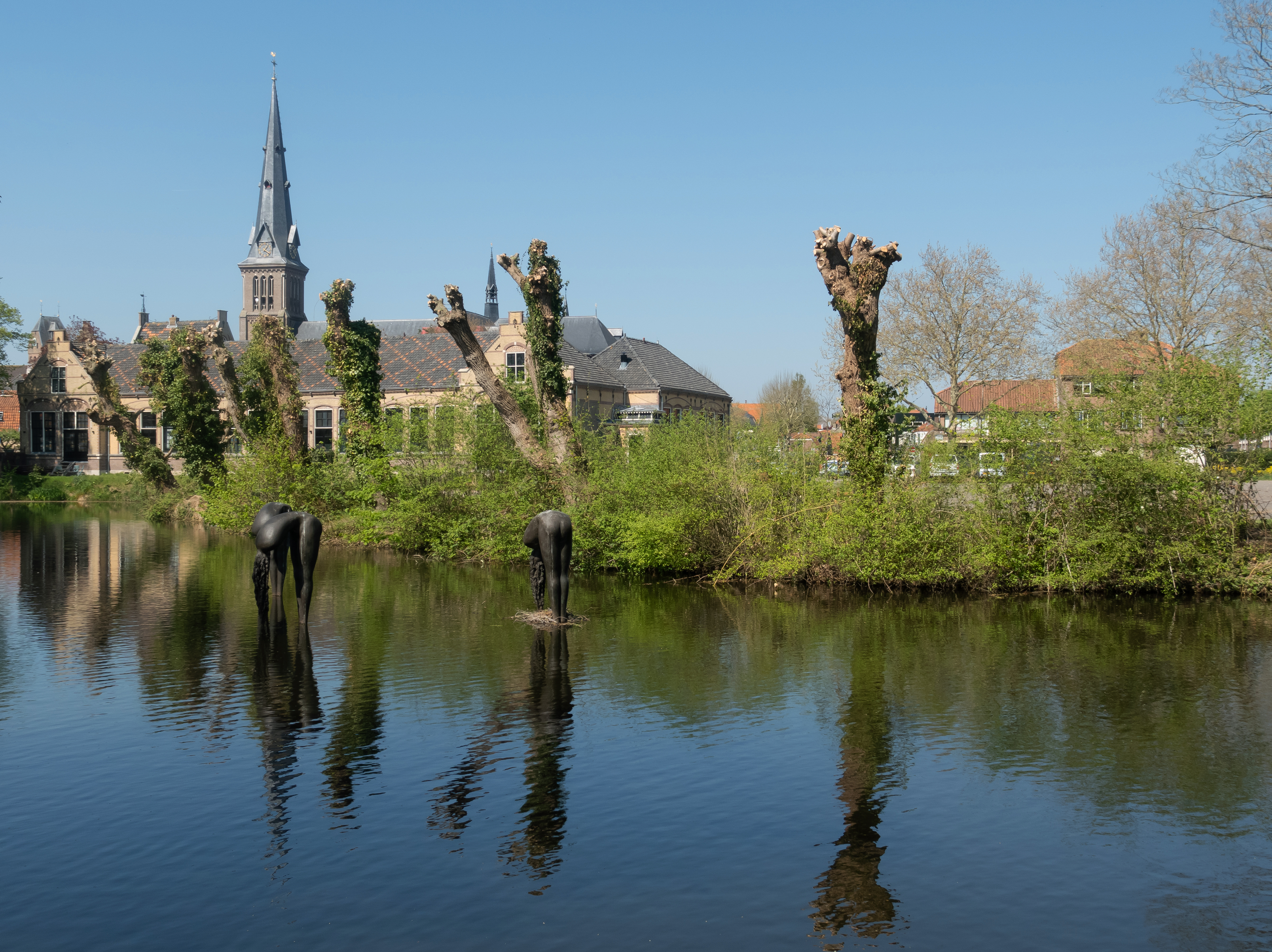
Church: the Sint-Franciskuskerk from Waardsedijk

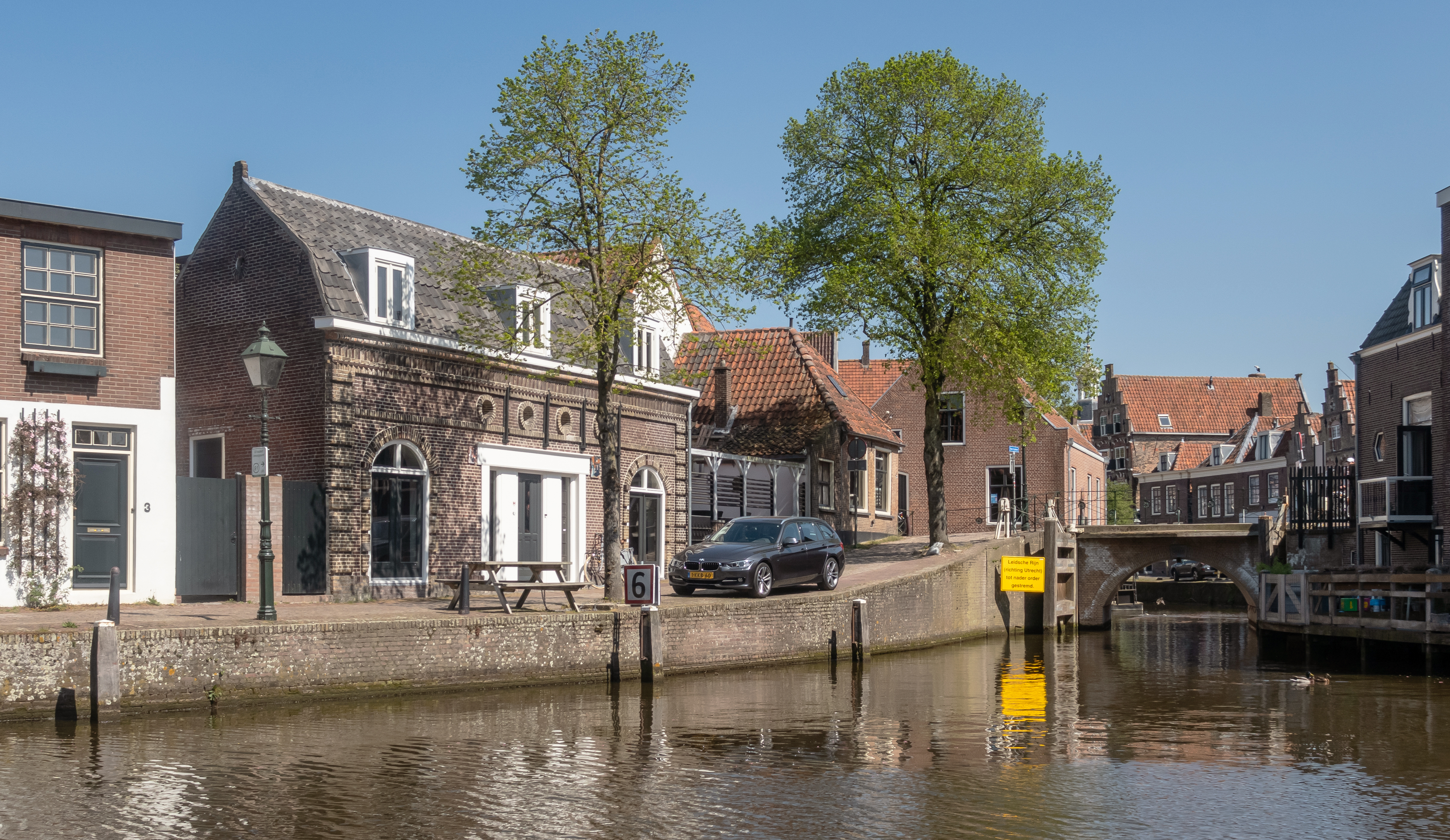
View to the canal and the bridge from IJsselkade

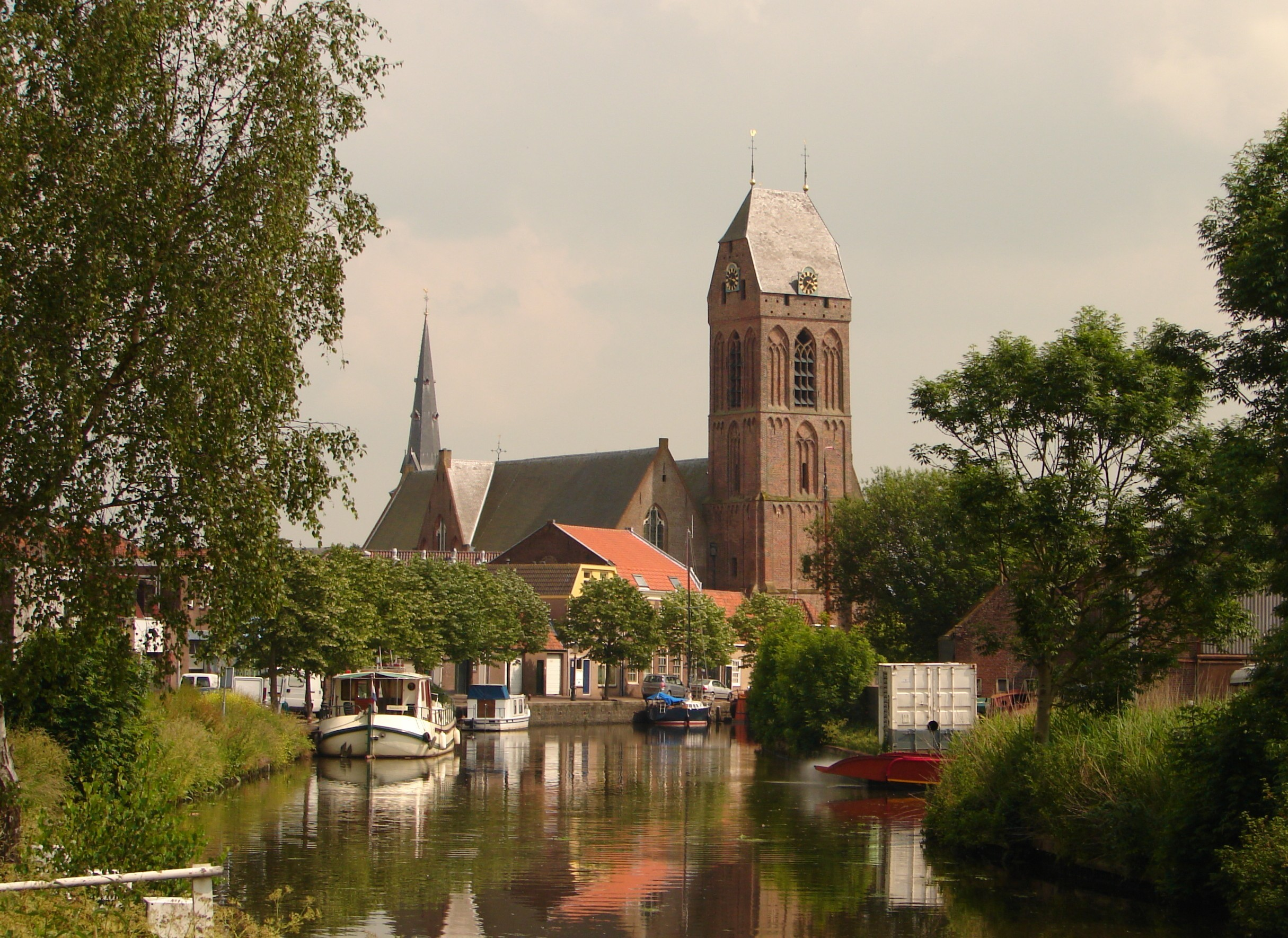
St.-Michaëls kerk, Oudewater

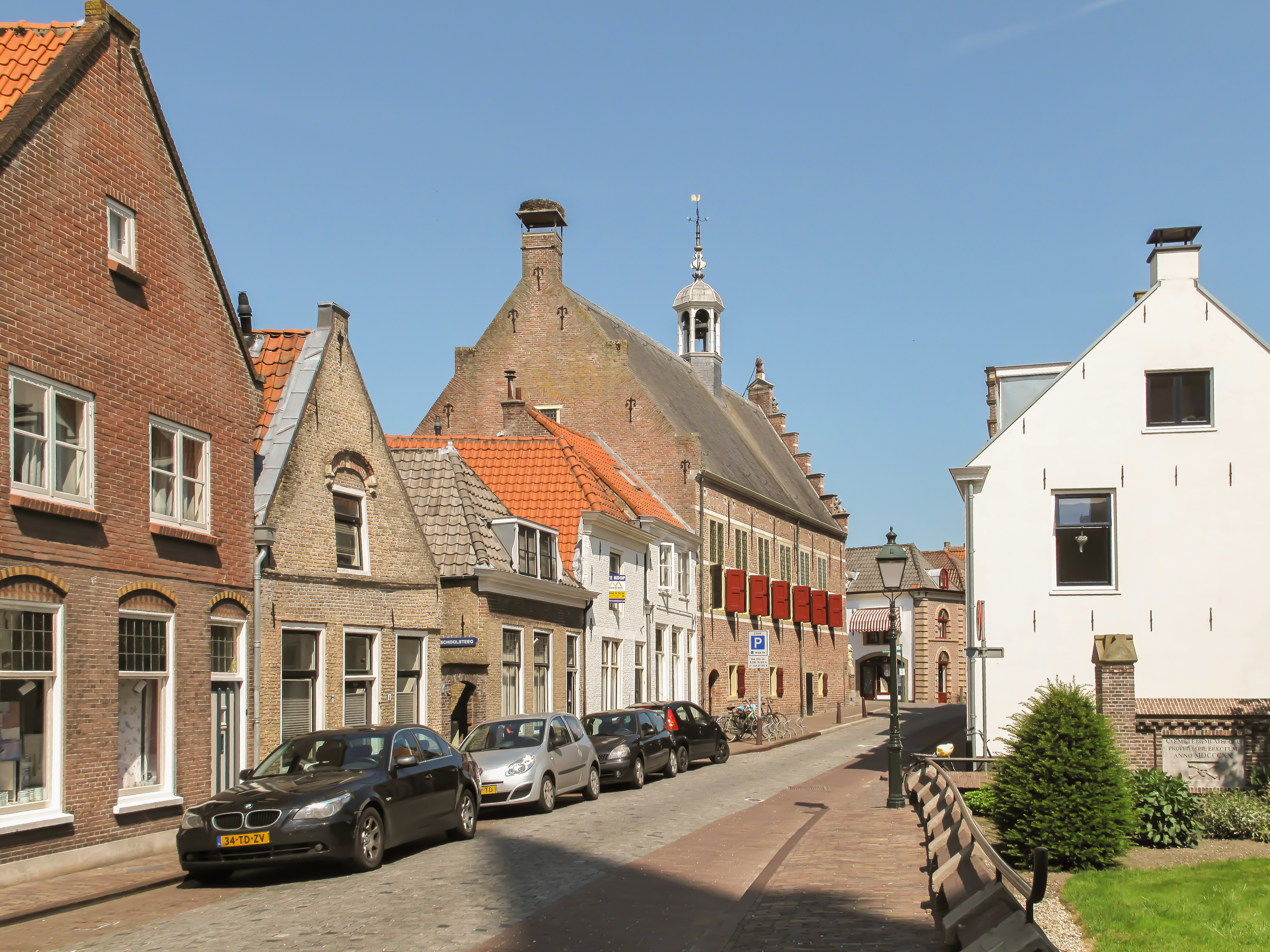
Former townhall in 2013
