= Jan Montyn =

Dutch artist (1924–2015)

- Born: 13 November 1924
- Died: 10 August 2015 (aged 90); Amsterdam, The Netherlands
- Occupation: artist
- Known for: his paintings of wars to which he had been an eyewitness

Notes
- He specialized in etching. In World War II, he joined the German navy and fought on the eastern front.

Jan Montyn (13 November 1924 – 10 August 2015) was a Dutch artist, specialized in etching. He was best known for his paintings of wars to which he had been an eyewitness.

Montyn was born in a conservative Calvinistic family and was raised in Oudewater. In the Second World War he joined the German navy and fought on the eastern front. After the war he lived in France and in the Netherlands. His work is displayed in the Bibliothèque Nationale in Paris, the Museum of Modern Art in New York City and the Museum Boijmans Van Beuningen in Rotterdam.

Montyn died on 10 August 2015 in Amsterdam, aged 90.

== Bibliography ==
- A Lamb to the Slaughter - An Artist Among the Battlefields, Jan Montyn and Dirk Ayelt Kooiman, Souvenir Press, London, 1984 ISBN 0-285-62621-3
- Website with work of the artist https://www.janmontyncollection.com/
