= Diemerbroek =

- Hamlet
- Location in the Netherlands
- Coordinates: 52°03′09″N 4°51′44″E
- Country: Netherlands
- Province: Utrecht
- Municipality: Oudewater

Population (2007)
  - Total: 160
- Time zone: UTC+1 (CET)
  - Summer (DST): UTC+2 (CEST)

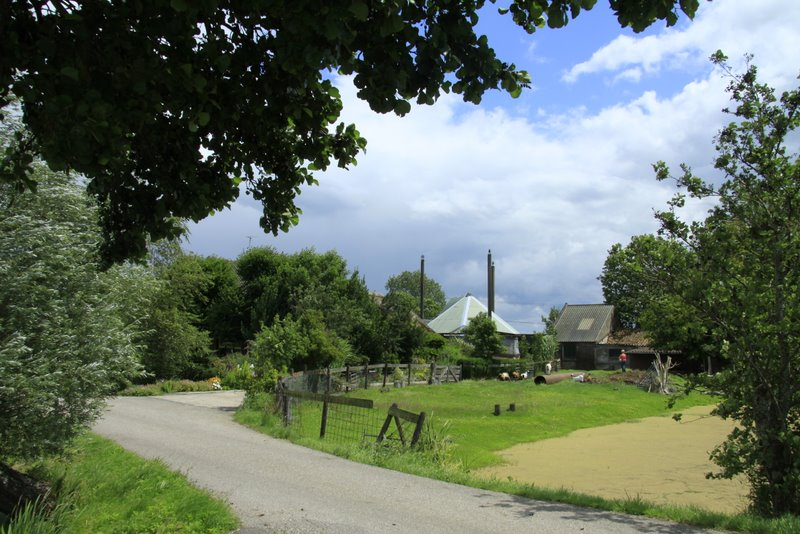

Diemerbroek is a village in the Dutch province of Utrecht. It is a part of the municipality of Oudewater, and lies about 3 km (1.9 mi) north of the town of Oudewater.

The statistical district "Diemerbroek", which covers the village and the surrounding countryside, has a population of around 150.
