= Papekop =

- Village
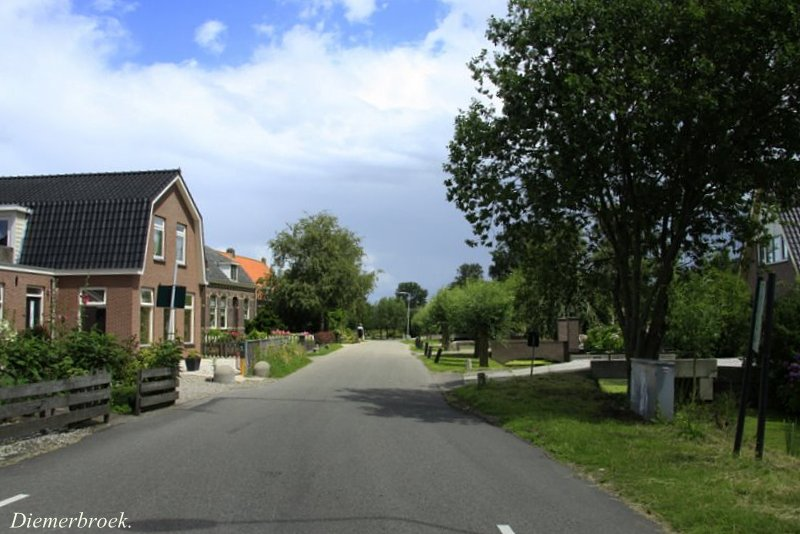
- Street view

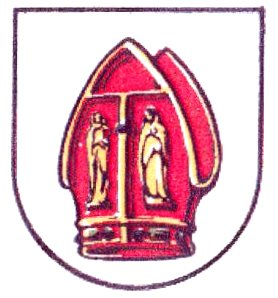
- Coat of arms

- Location in the Netherlands Papekop (Netherlands)
- Coordinates: 52°2′47″N 4°51′5″E
- Country: Netherlands
- Province: Utrecht
- Municipality: Oudewater

Area
  - Total: 5.08 km^{2} (1.96 sq mi)
- Elevation: −1.4 m (−4.6 ft)

Population (2021)
  - Total: 385
  - Density: 75.8/km^{2} (196/sq mi)
- Time zone: UTC+1 (CET)
  - Summer (DST): UTC+2 (CEST)
- Postal code: 3464
- Dialing code: 0348

Papekop is a village in the Dutch province of Utrecht. It is a part of the municipality of Oudewater, and lies about 3 km northwest of the city of Oudewater.

Papekop was a separate municipality between 1818 and 1964, when it merged with Driebruggen. Between 1821 and 1989, when it became part of Oudewater, the village was located in the province of South Holland.

The village was first mentioned around 1307 as Papencoip, and means "(peat) concession of Pape (probably a clergy)". In 1840, it was home to 284 people. Between 1858 and 1936, there was a railway station in Papekop.

== Gallery ==
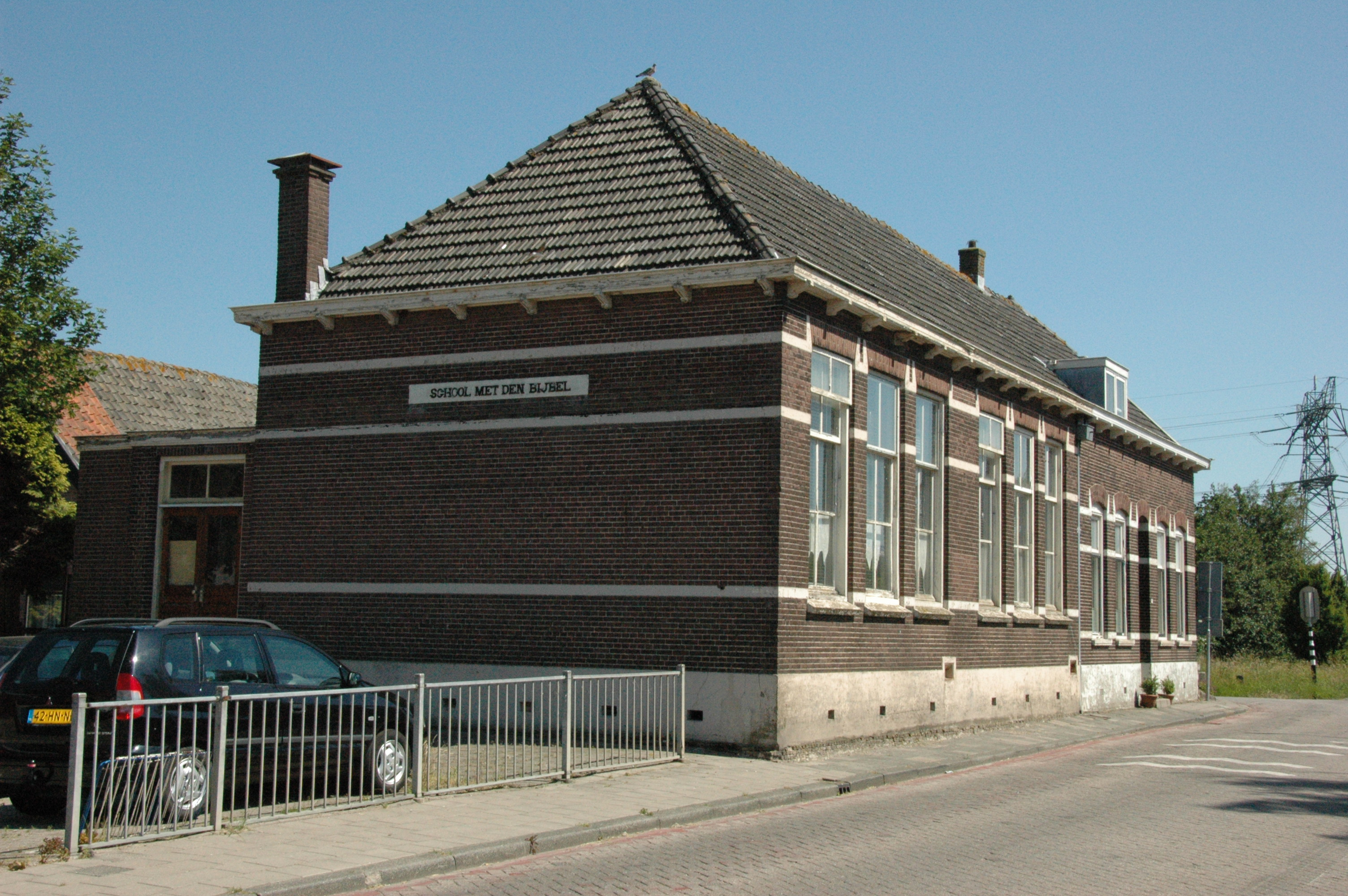
School in Papekop

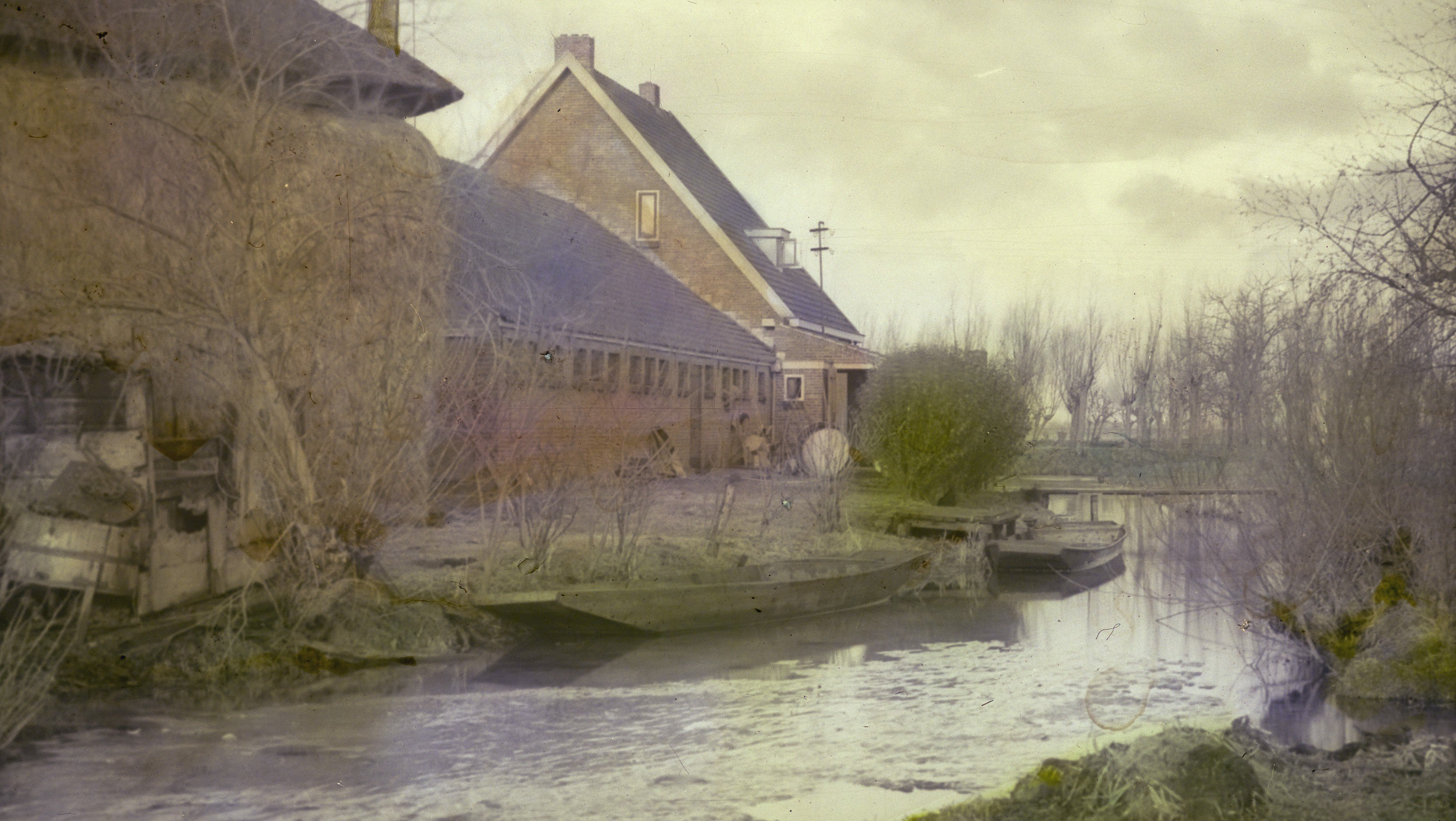
Painting of a farm in Papekop

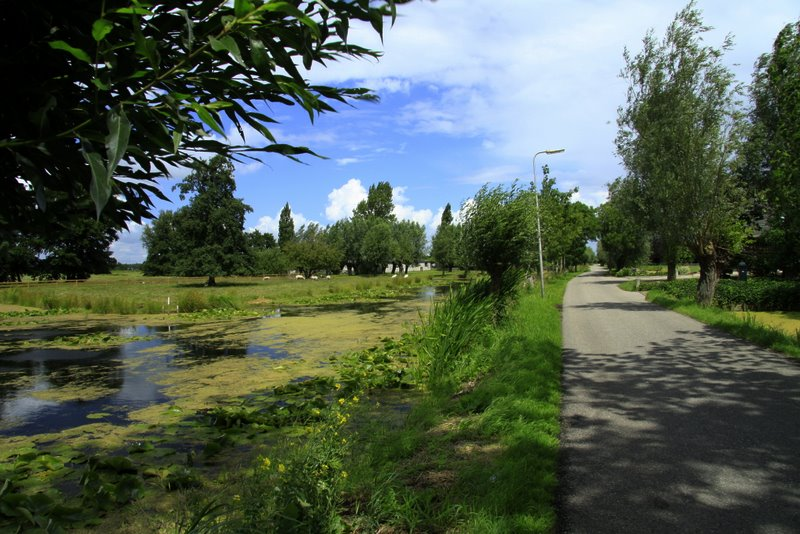
Landscape

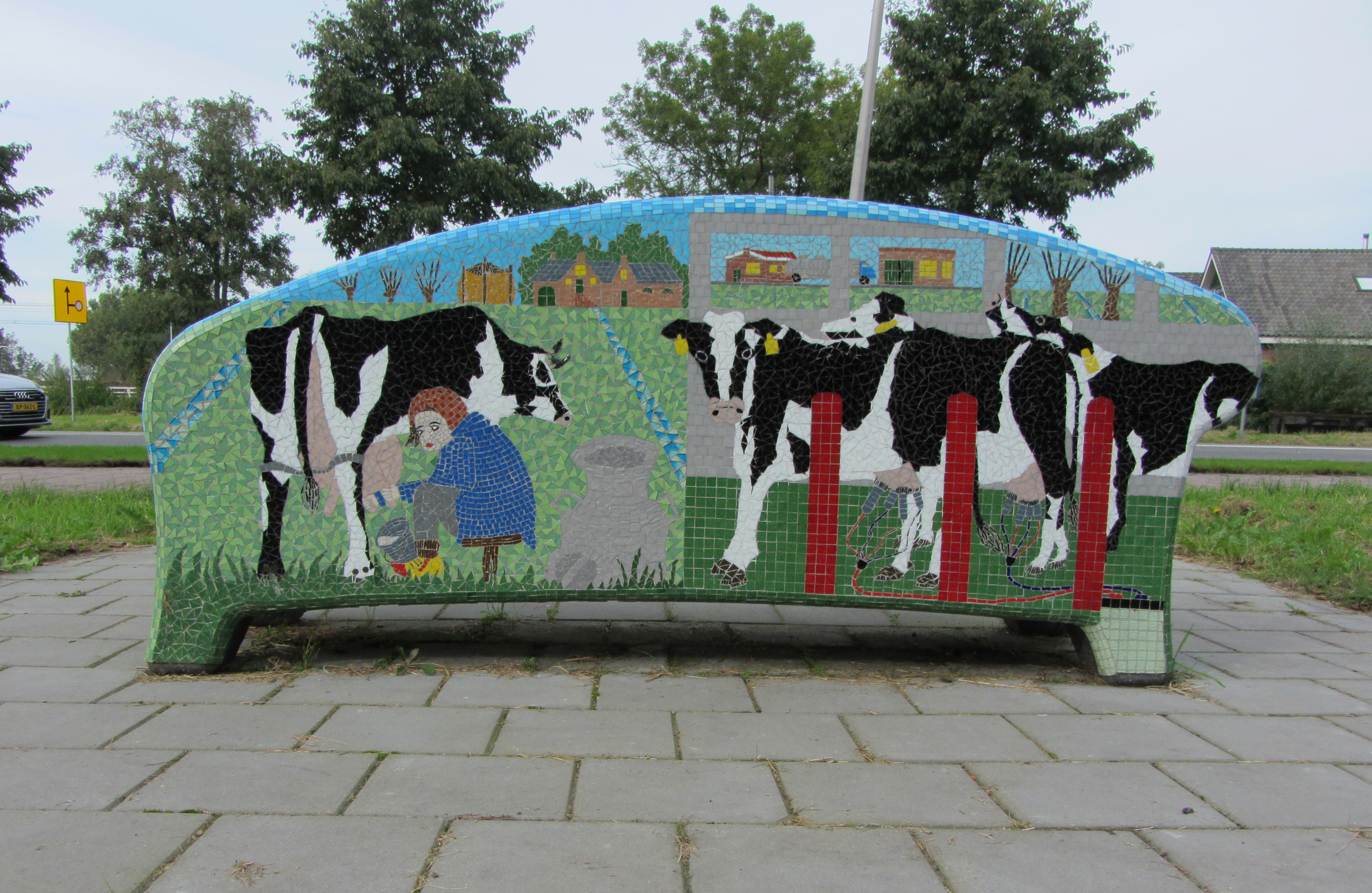
Social sofa in Papekop
