= Lange Linschoten =

- Hamlet
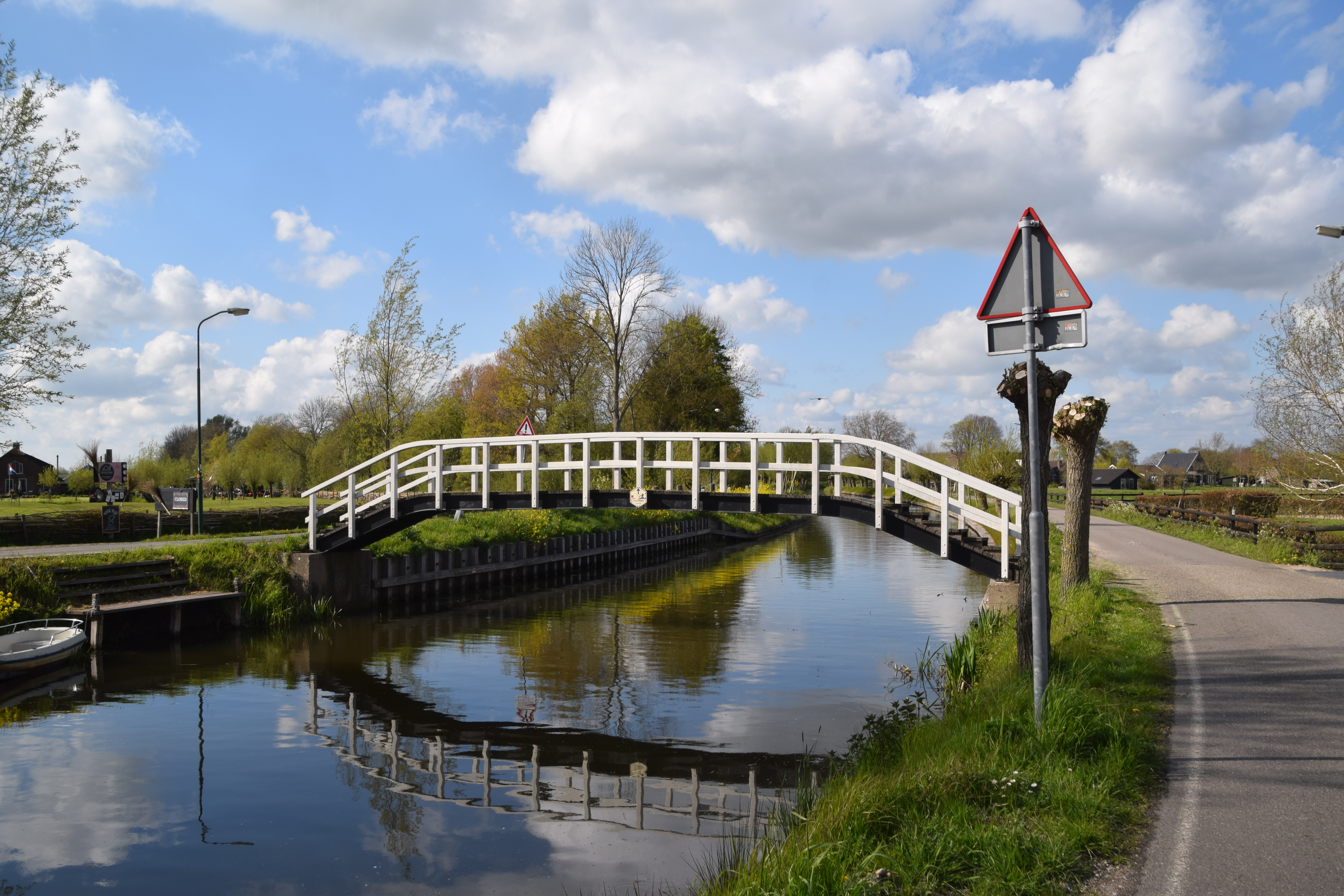
- A typical bridge, a kwakel, in Lange Linschoten

- Location in the Netherlands Lange Linschoten (Netherlands)
- Coordinates: 52.04071°N 4.88882°E
- Country: Netherlands
- Province: Utrecht
- Municipality: Oudewater
- Time zone: UTC+1 (CET)
  - Summer (DST): UTC+2 (CEST)
- Postal code: 3425
- Dialing code: 0348

Lange Linschoten is a hamlet in the Dutch province of Utrecht. It is a part of the municipality of Oudewater, and lies about 2 km northeast of the city of Oudewater.

The hamlet was first mentioned in 1555 as Lange Lynschoten, and means "the long part of the Linschoten (river)". It is not a statistical entity, and the postal authorities have placed it under Snelrewaard. In 1840, Lange Linschoten was home to 144 people. Nowadays, it consists of about 120 houses.

== Gallery ==
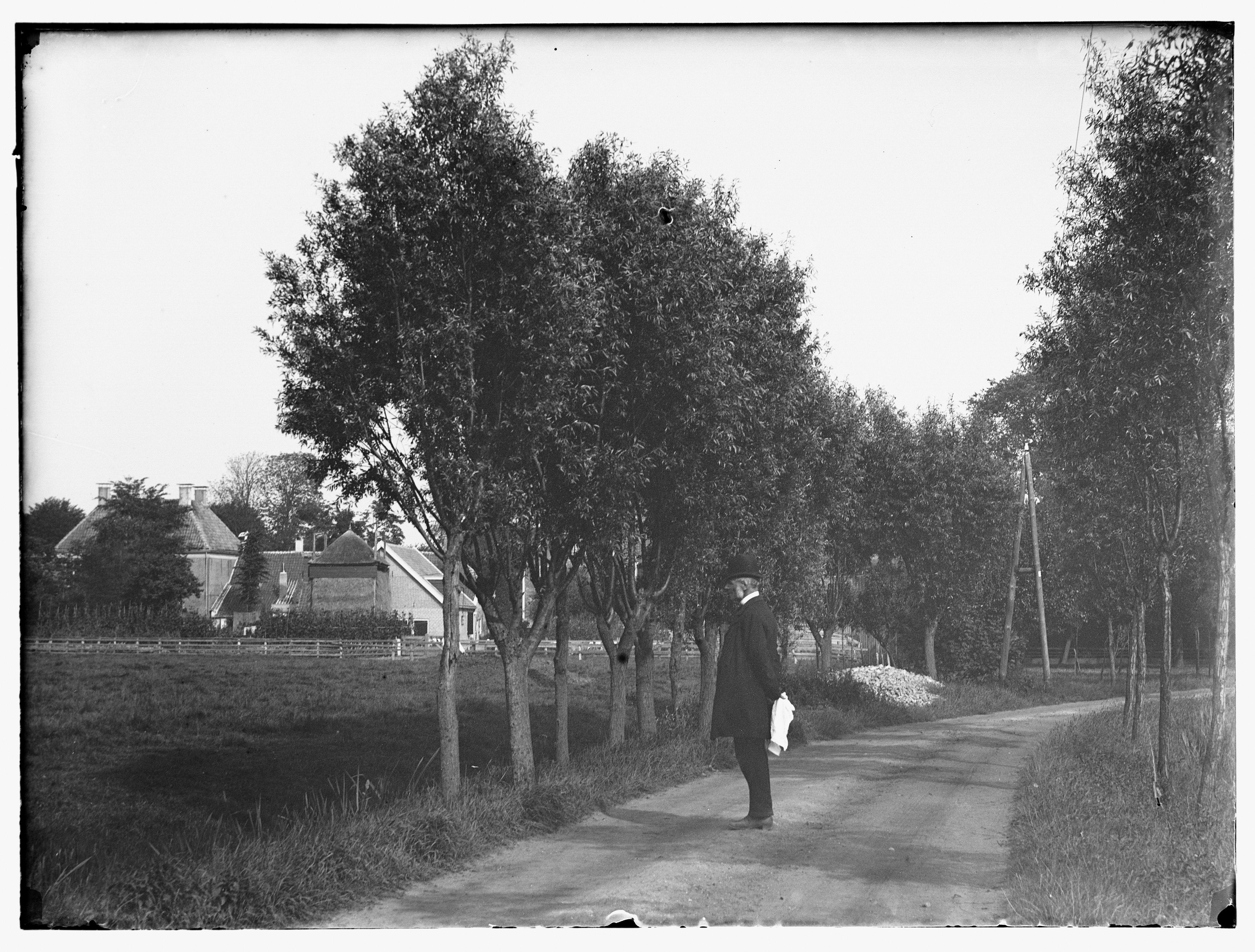
Lange Linschoten (1891)

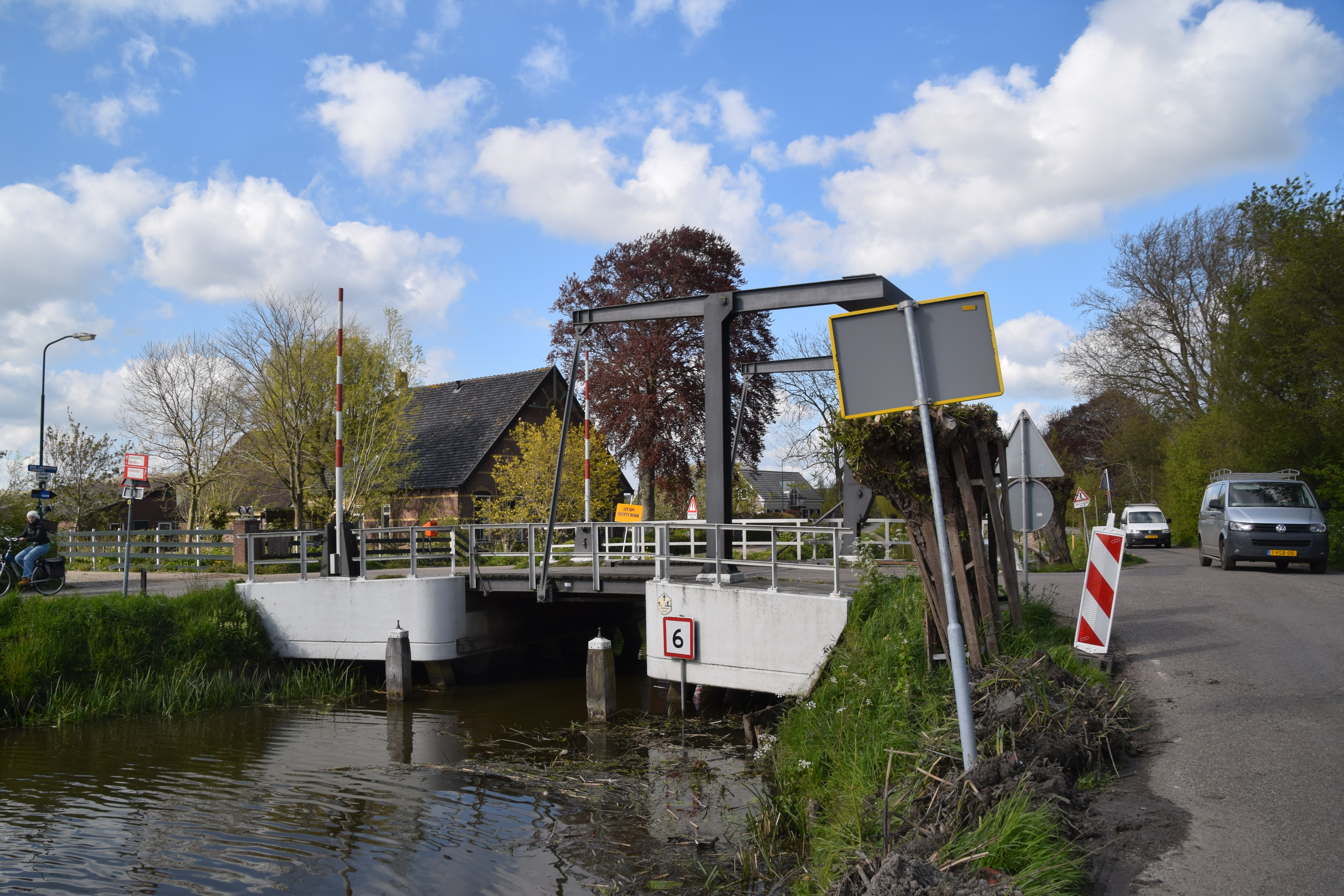
Vrouwenbrug in Lange Linschoten
