= Linschoten (surname) =

Linschoten is a Dutch surname.

== Notable people ==
Notable people with this surname include:

- Adriaen Cornelisz van Linschoten (1590–1677), Dutch painter
- Jan Huyghen van Linschoten (1563–1611), Dutch merchant and historian
- Robin Linschoten (born 1956), Dutch politician

== See also ==
- Linschoten (disambiguation)
