= Weigh house =

Public building in which goods are weighed

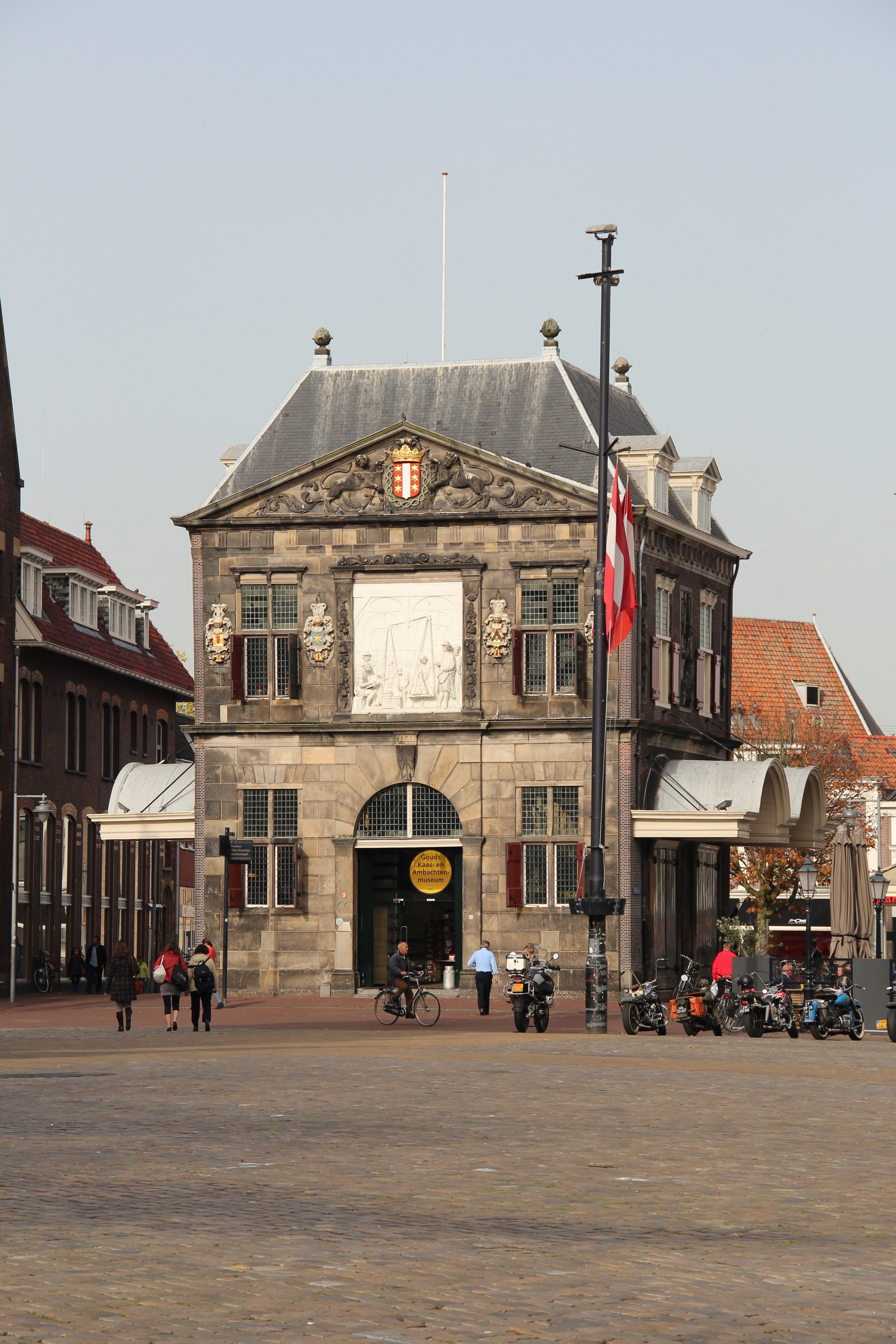
Weigh house in Gouda (1668)

A weighhouse or weighing house is a public building at or within which goods are weighed. Most of these buildings were built before 1800, prior to the establishment of international standards for weights, and were often large and representative structures, situated near the market square, town hall, and prominent sacred buildings in town centre.

As public control of the weight of goods was very important, they were run by local authorities who would also use them for the levying of taxes on goods transported through or sold within the city.

Throughout most of Europe, this building was a multifunctional trade hall and would maintain diverse functions related to trade and commerce. There is a large variety among their physical organization and the external appearance due to the fundamentally different political and economic conditions that existed throughout Europe.

== History ==
The weighhouse had two functions: to determine the weight of a given item in addition to levying and collecting tax upon it. The first function, the need to precisely determine the weight of a commodity, was of particular importance in the pre-industrial period, where regional differences regarding the calculations of measures and weights existed and there were few large instruments for weighing available. The second function concerned the need to control and regulate access to trade. In the 19th century, the public scale declined in importance due to the standardization of weights and measures in addition to the replacement of direct payment of duties by indirect methods of tax collection.

Public scales most likely existed in ancient Egypt. During the Middle Ages in Europe, the right to levy tax based upon weight was a source of income which belonged to the rights of the sovereign, who could bestow it to a city or sell in perpetuity. As a rule, the right to levy taxes based upon the weight of merchandise was connected to the local market taxes as well as the provision of the staple right. The latter required travelling merchants to offer their goods for sale for a period of time when they passed through a city and also to have them weighed. Conversely, small settlements, like villages, were generally prohibited from maintaining public scales.

During the Middle Ages, public scales were usually housed in a multifunctional trade hall. The designation of these buildings was more or less random, and only one of the multiple functions provided the name for the building.

Thus, public scales were located in a cloth hall, or a meat hall or a store house etc. Furthermore, public scales were sometimes situated in the town hall or, conversely, a council hall may have been integrated into the weigh house. Therefore, throughout much of Europe, if a building is designated as a “weigh house”, it can be assumed that other functions took place within it too. Such a building, which contained one or more public scales in addition to several other functions, is typically identified as a “so-called weigh house”. Furthermore, there often specific places and instruments for weighing different kinds of goods (for example, salt scales, fat scales, iron scales, hay scales, etc.), and most probably these were brought together in a single building or distributed among several structures with similar purposes.

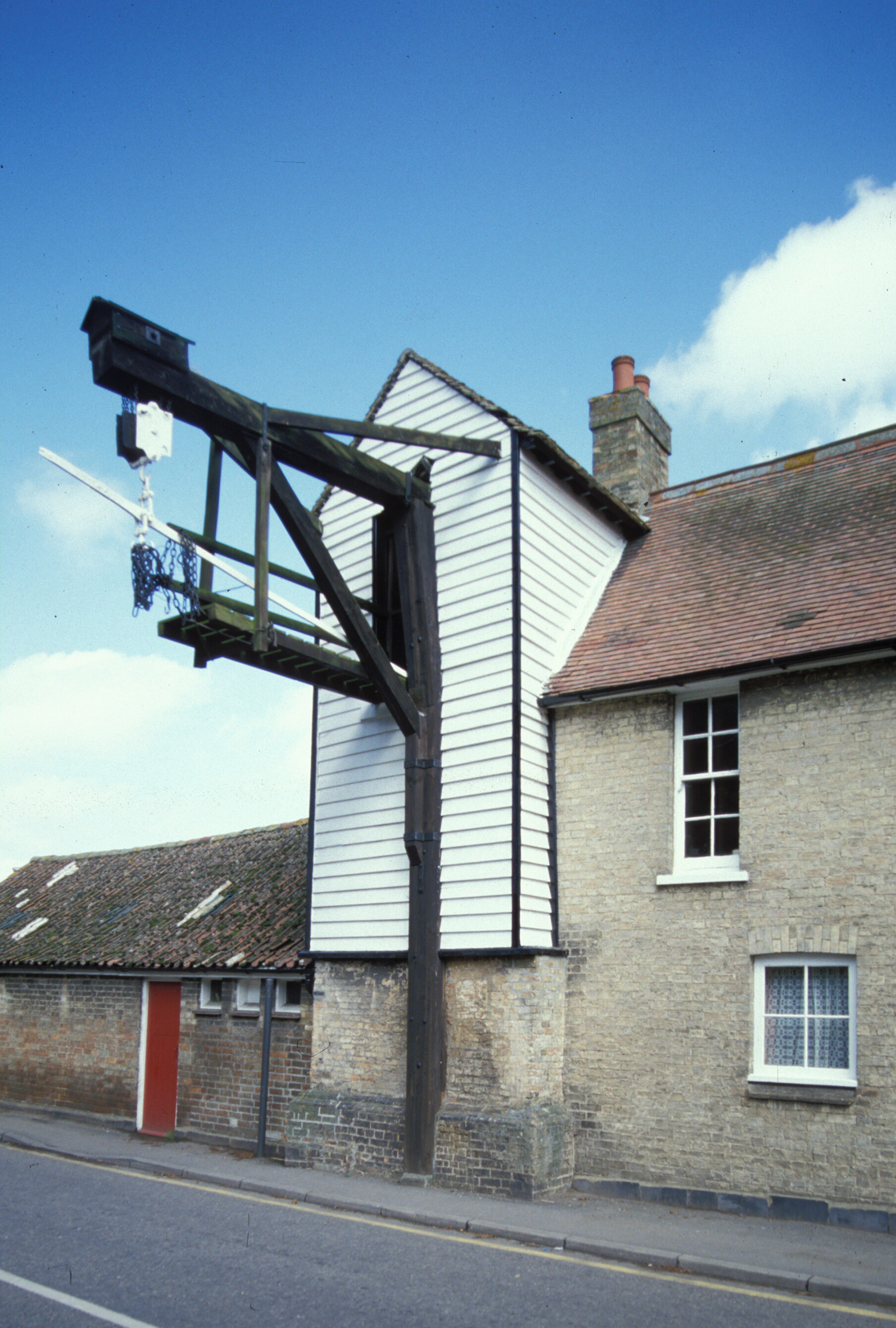
Hay scales in Soham (GB)

Depending on how political circumstances impacted the prosperity of cities, the multifunctional trade halls which housed the public scales took on diverse architectural expression throughout the different regions of Europe. In Flanders, with its relatively weak central power, for example, the cloth halls in the Middle Ages display impressive, monumental proportions (Ypres, Bruges, Mechelen). In France, on the other hand, due to the strong control of cities by the nobility, trade halls are often reduced to simple, long wooden constructions that are open along the lateral facades, as e.g. in Monpazier. In England the important harbor cities feature large trade halls (a.o. Norwich, King's Lynn, York and London). In Germany, in contrast, the trade and assembly functions are often distributed among several buildings. Here, buildings that contain public scales are located at or near large urban squares.

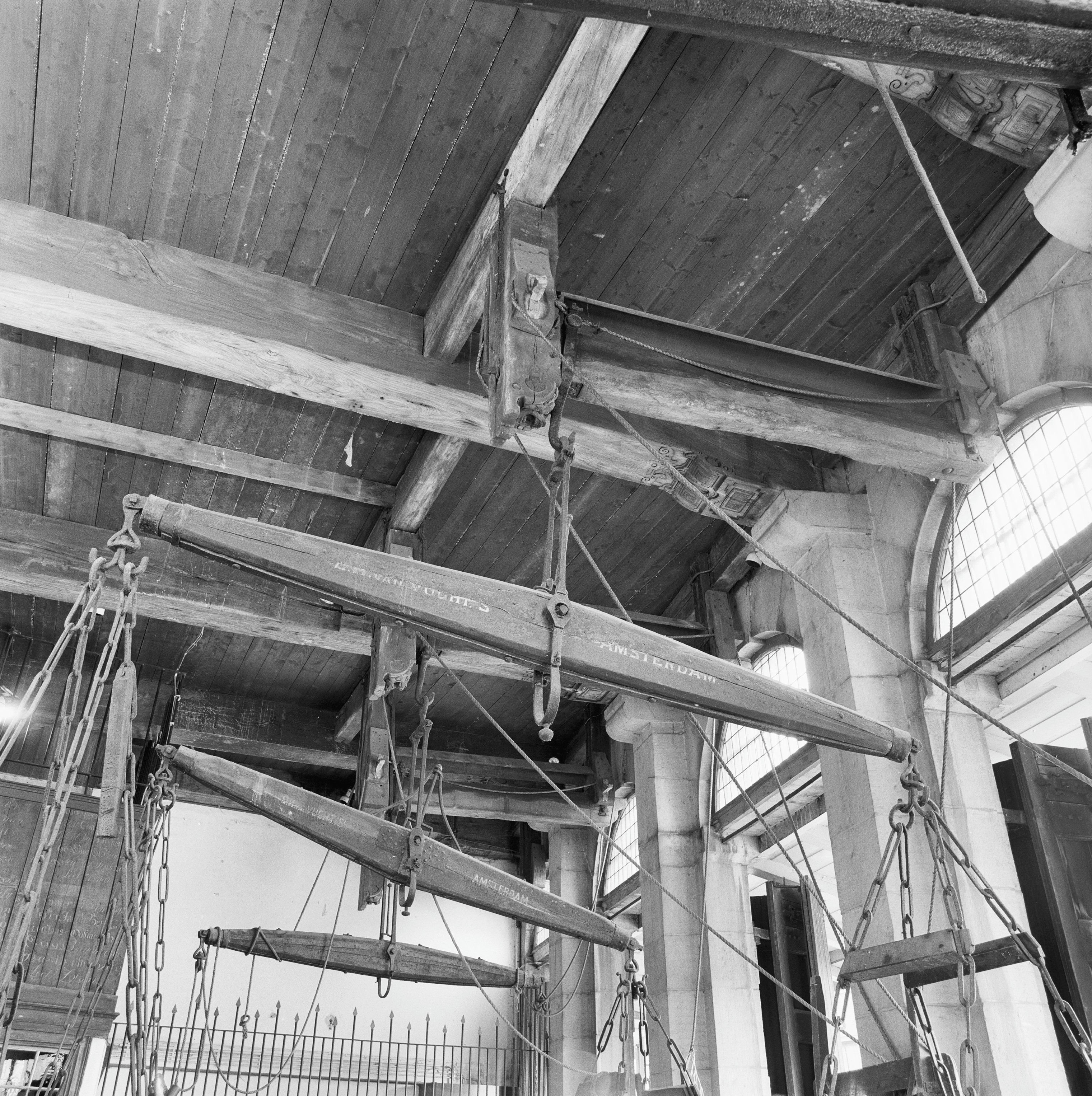
Original interior of the weigh house of Hoorn. The scales here are made of wood, suspended from running beams and movable using overhead trolleys

Beginning in the 17th century in Holland, due to the special political and economic conditions of the Republic of the Seven United Provinces, a unique typology devoted to the weighing of merchandise was developed. Known as the (monofunctional) weigh house, it differs from the other buildings in feudal absolutist Europe that accommodated weighing at this time, because its ground floor is exclusively devoted to the function of weighing. The main reasons for the emergence of this typology include the abolition of the staple right in connection with the creation of the free movement of goods within the country in combination with the concentration of Dutch agriculture on the production of dairy products, such as butter and cheese, at that time. Whereas the mass of some foodstuffs, such as grains, was often determined using hollow measures, provisions such as butter and cheese had to be weighed to determine their weight.

The Dutch monofunctional weigh house is found in cities that are located along the western coast of North and South Holland, as well as those with direct access to the major rivers and in the province of Friesland. These weigh houses often have highly functional interiors. During the daytime, large scales, which are suspended from moveable beams and trolleys, are pushed out of the building and are parked under a canopy. After weighing is completed, they are driven back into the building and can be safely stored there at night.

Based on their physical organization and structural characteristics, Dutch weigh houses are divided into four subtypes: The passage type (found exclusively in the Friesian cities of Leeuwarden, Workum, Franeker); the tower type (Haarlem, Makkum); the portico type, (Hoorn, Monnickendam, Rotterdam); and the synthesis of the tower type and the portico type (Amsterdam, Leiden, Gouda). In addition, there are a number of existing buildings of other typologies which were repurposed and adapted for use as weigh house (u. a. Alkmaar, Delft, Medemblik).

In the Netherlands, the structural and technical development of the (monofunctional) weigh house came to a conclusion just prior to the introduction of the Napoleonic reforms at the end of the 18th century. In the rest of Europe, other conditions, notably the abolishment of internal customs introduced by the emerging nation-states as well as the collection of taxes based on the value of goods, that lead to a decisive change in the design of the buildings erected for trade and commerce. No longer a venue where goods were weighed and taxation was imposed, beginning in the 19th century, the sole function of a public weigh house was thereafter reduced to the determination of weight. The weigh houses continued to serve this purpose until the middle of the 20th century, when they became ultimately obsolete.

== See also ==
- List of buildings identified as weigh house
- Tron (Scotland)
- Weigh station, a checkpoint along a highway to inspect vehicular weights, usually equipped with a truck scale (weigh bridge)
