= List of buildings identified as weigh house =

== Belgium ==
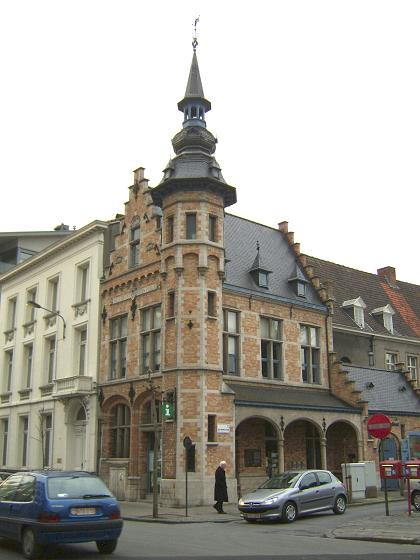
Kortrijk Weigh house

- Antwerpen (1547–1873, precedent)
- Weigh house of Kortrijk (?)

== Estonia ==
- Weigh house of Narva (1741–1944)

== France ==
- Poids du Roi La Rochelle (?)
- Poids public Buzet-sur-Tarn
- Poids public La Chpelle Grésignac in Dordogne

== Germany ==
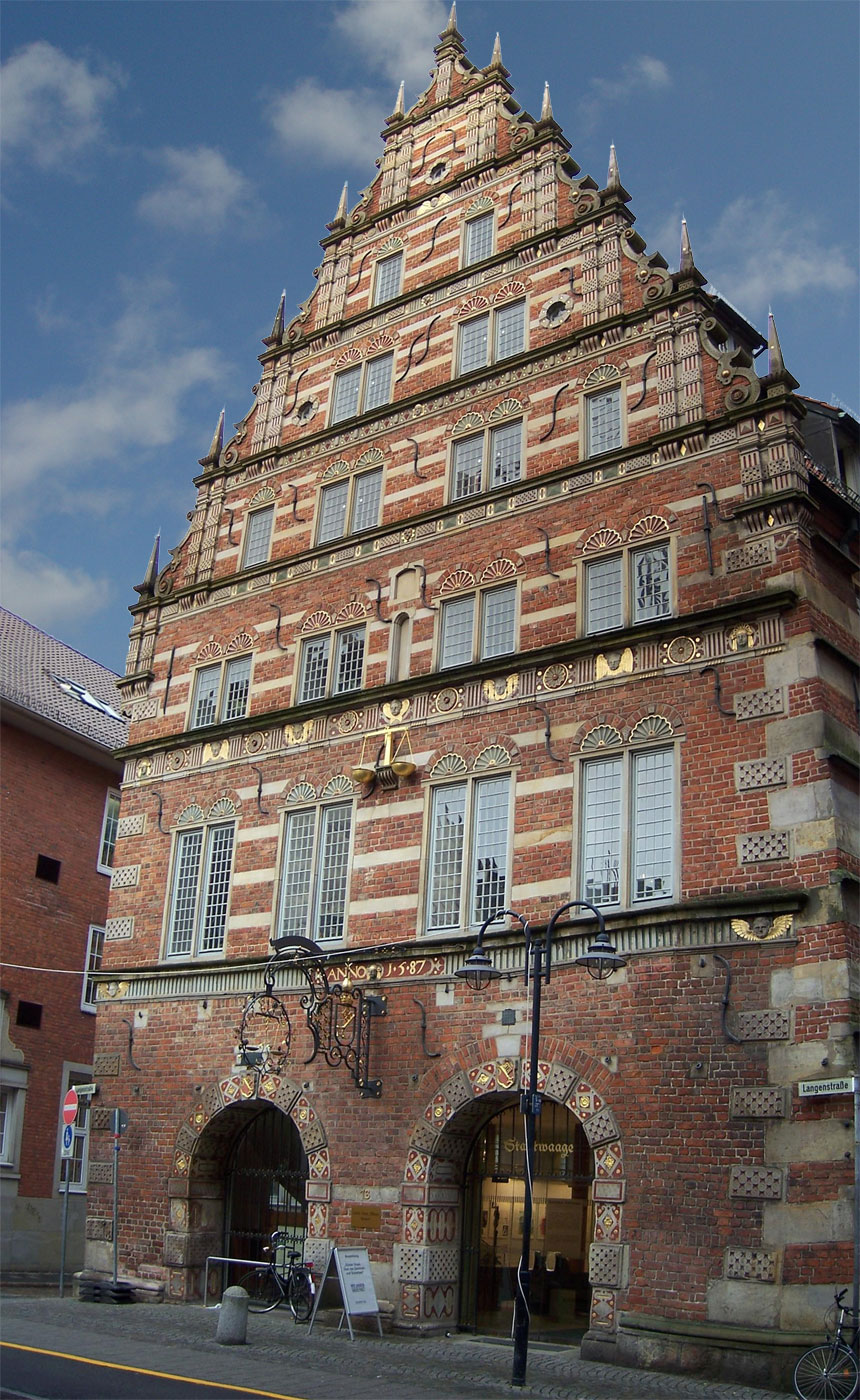
Bremen Weigh House (D)

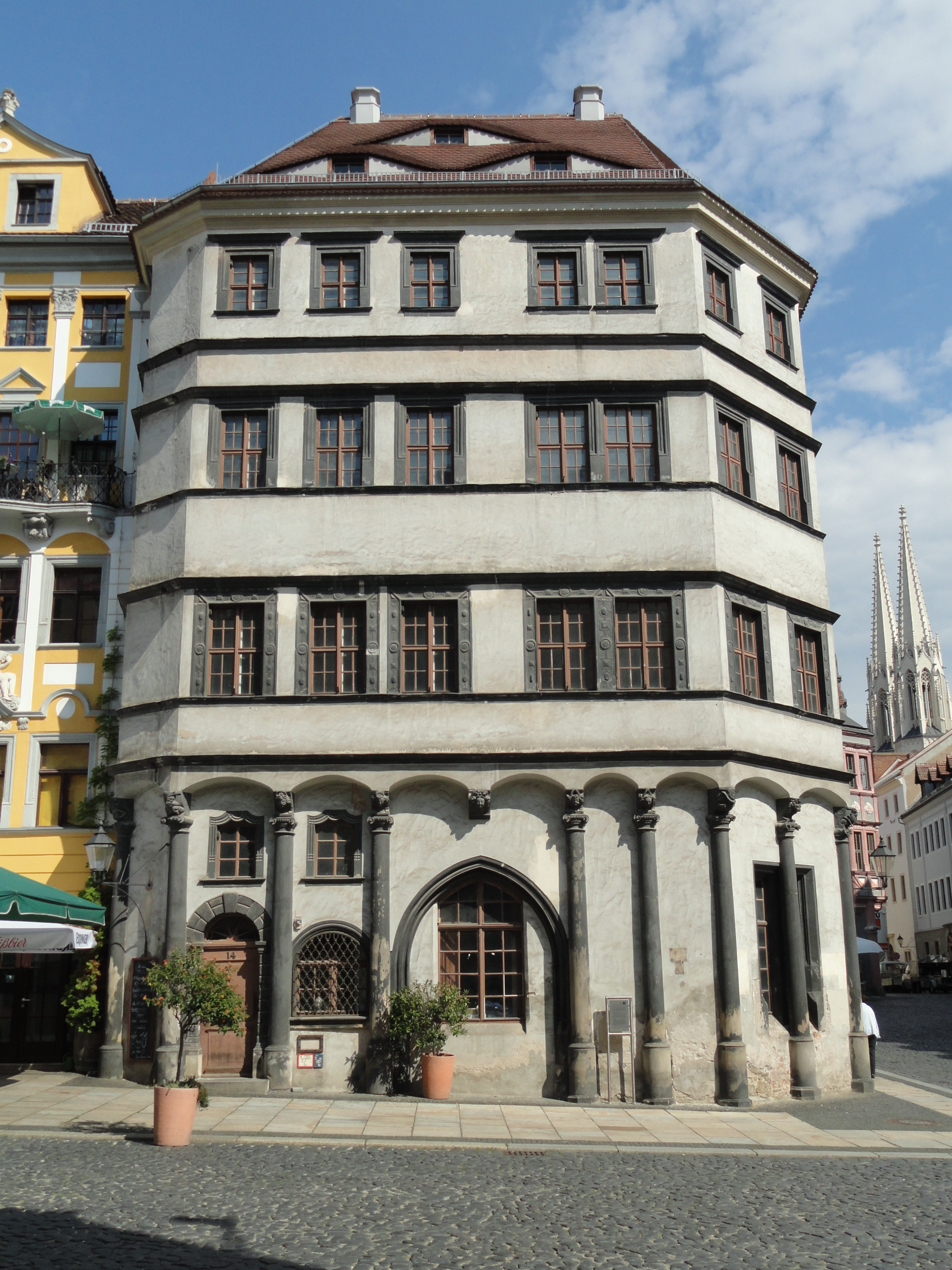
Görlitz Weigh House (D)

- Weigh house in Berlin (1831, part of the new storage yard called "Packhof")
- Weigh house of Brakel (around 1350)
- Old weigh house of Braunschweig (1534-1944, 1994)
- Weigh house of Bremen (1588)
- Weigh house of Frankfurt on the Main (1503-1944)
- Weigh house of Görlitz (1600)
- Weigh house of Halle/Saale (1581)
- Weigh house of Hamburg (1672–1842)
- Weigh house of Kempten (?)
- Weigh house of Leer (1714)
- Weigh house of Leipzig (1555)
- Weigh house of Lübeck (1444, annex town hall called "Kriegsstubenbau")
- Weigh house of Osnabrück (1532)
- Weigh house of Ravensburg (1556)
- Weigh house of Stade (1753)
- Weigh house of Stralsund (13. or 14. c.)
- Harbour weigh house in Stralsund (13. or 14. c.)

== Great Britain ==
- Weigh house of Edinburgh (1352–1820, ?)
- Custom house of London (1718)
- The Weigh House, Southampton

== Ireland ==
- Gort (Mid to late 18th c.)
- Scariff, County Clare.

== Italy ==
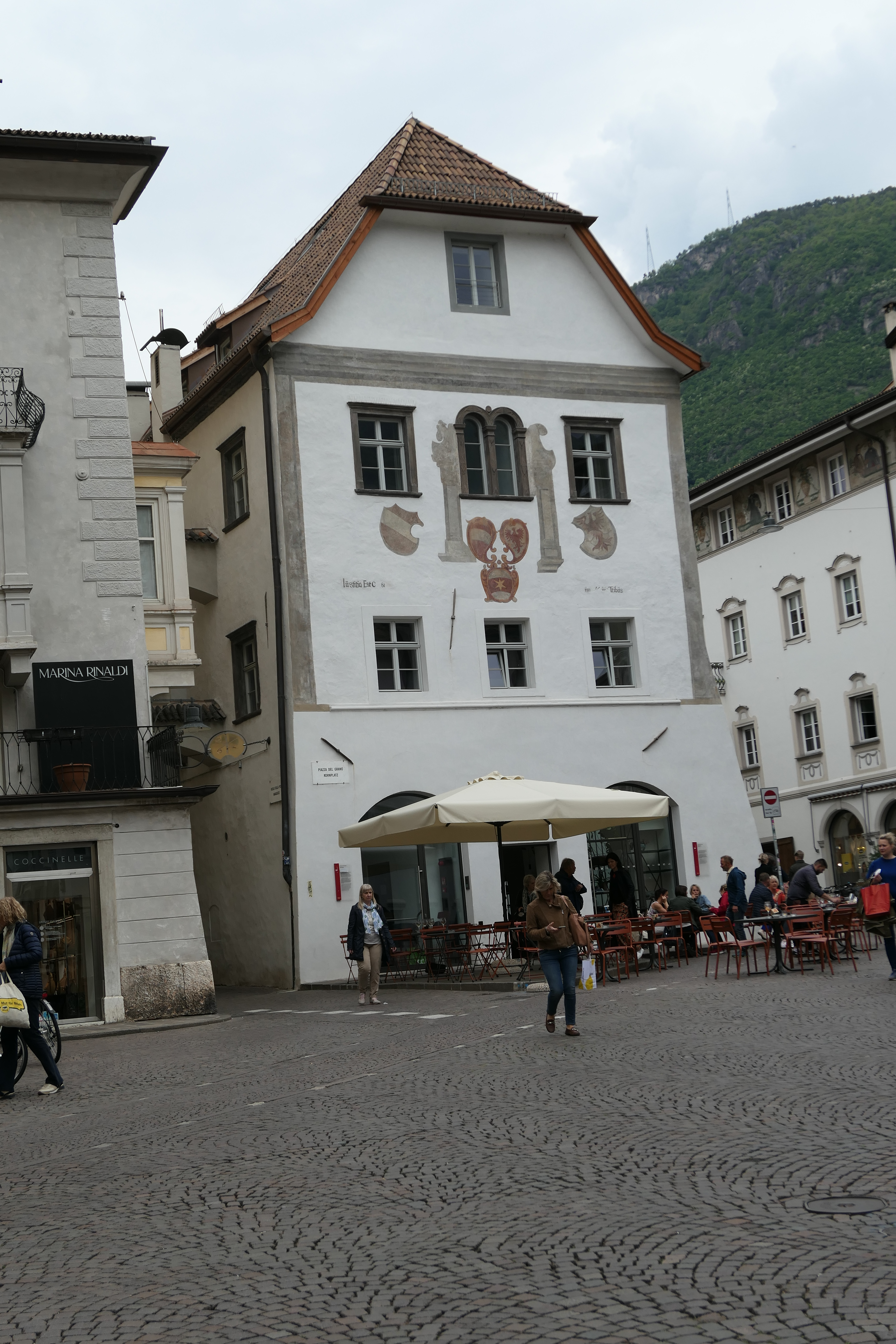
Weigh house of Bolzano (I)

- Weigh house of Bolzano (14. c.)
- Dogana of Florence (1495, annex to the Palazzo Vecchio)
- Dogana di San Fermo in Verona (1746
- Dogana Terra in Venice (after 1513, Palazzo dei Dieci Savi);

== Netherlands ==
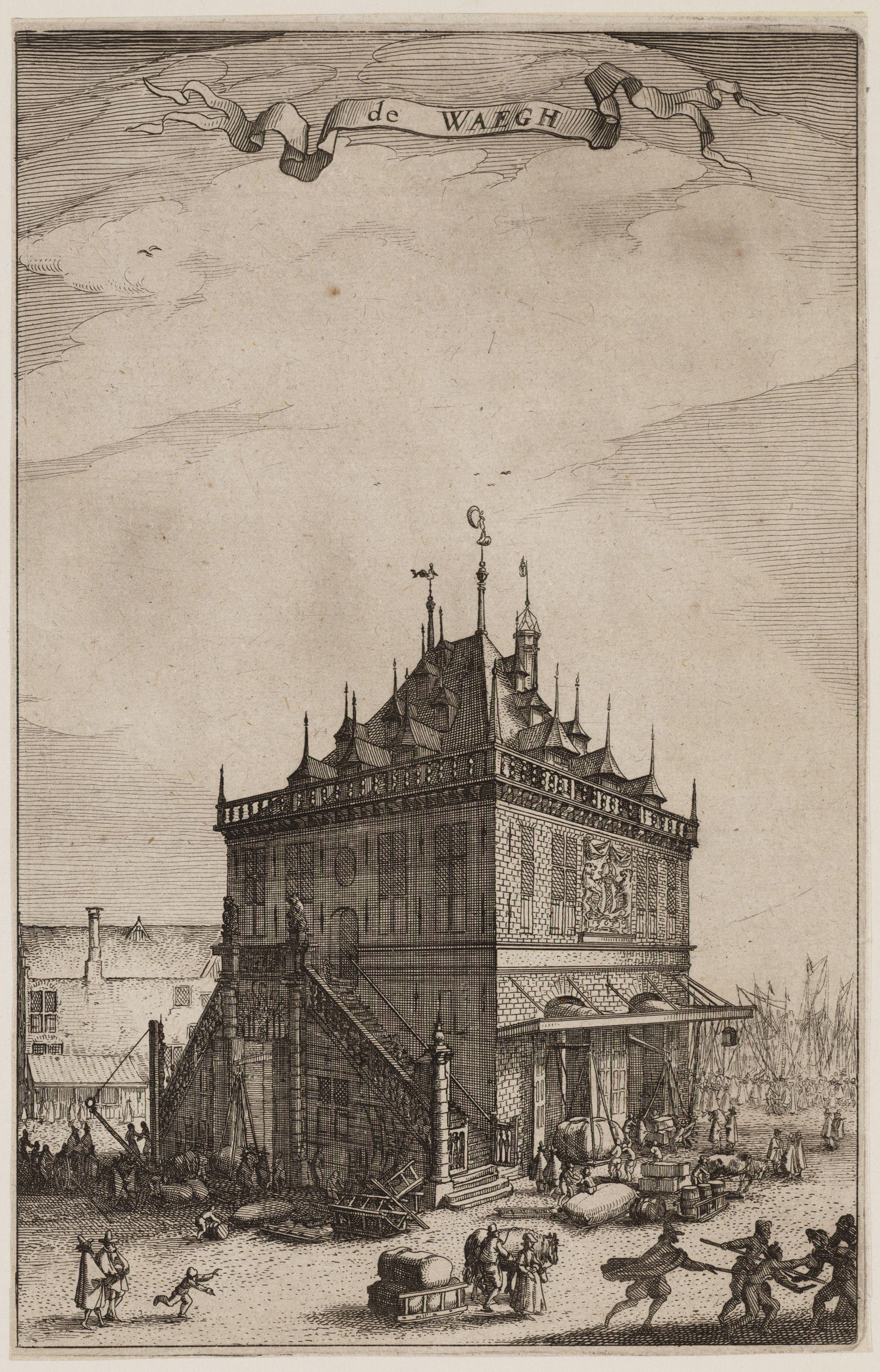
Amsterdam Weigh house

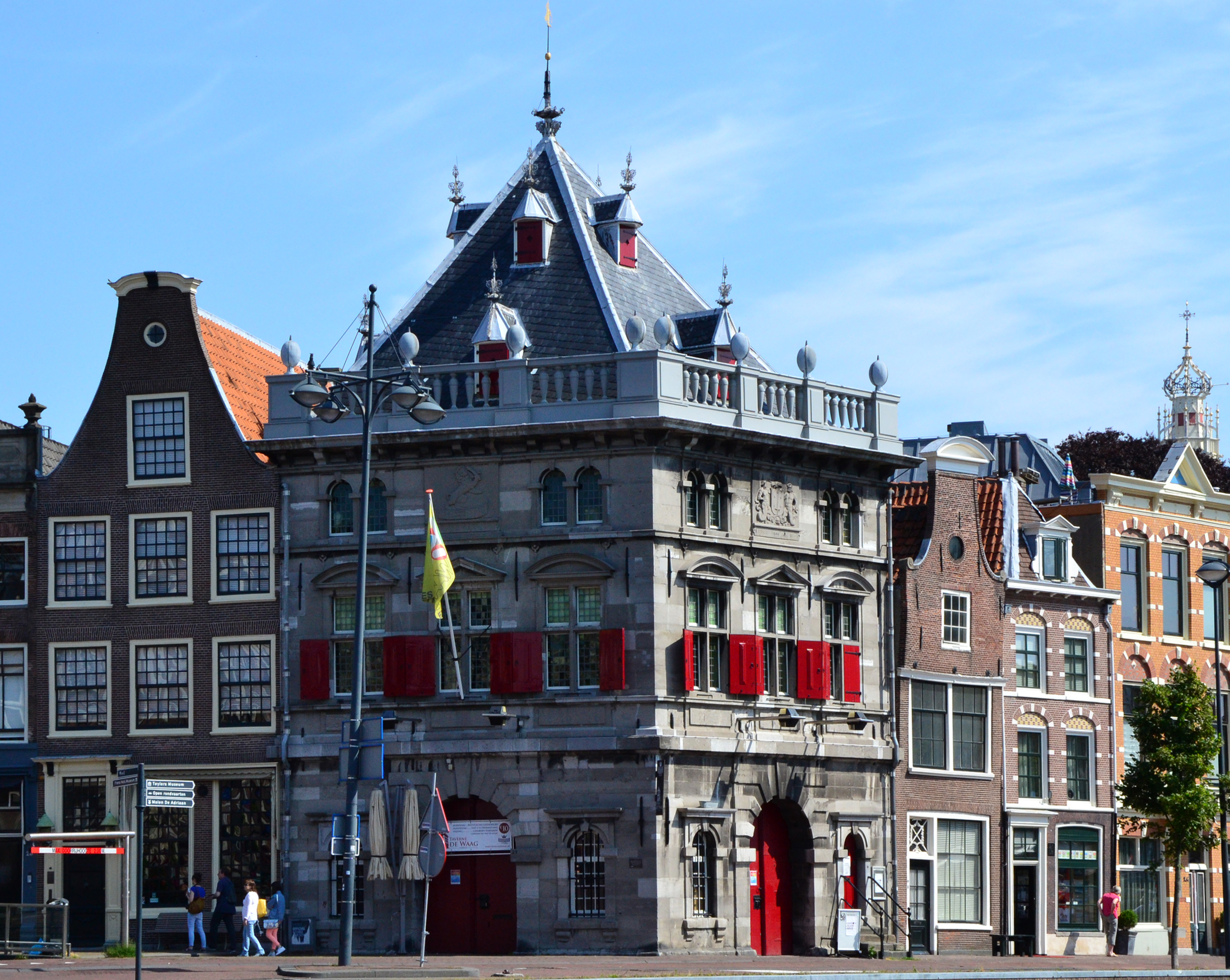
Haarlem Weigh house

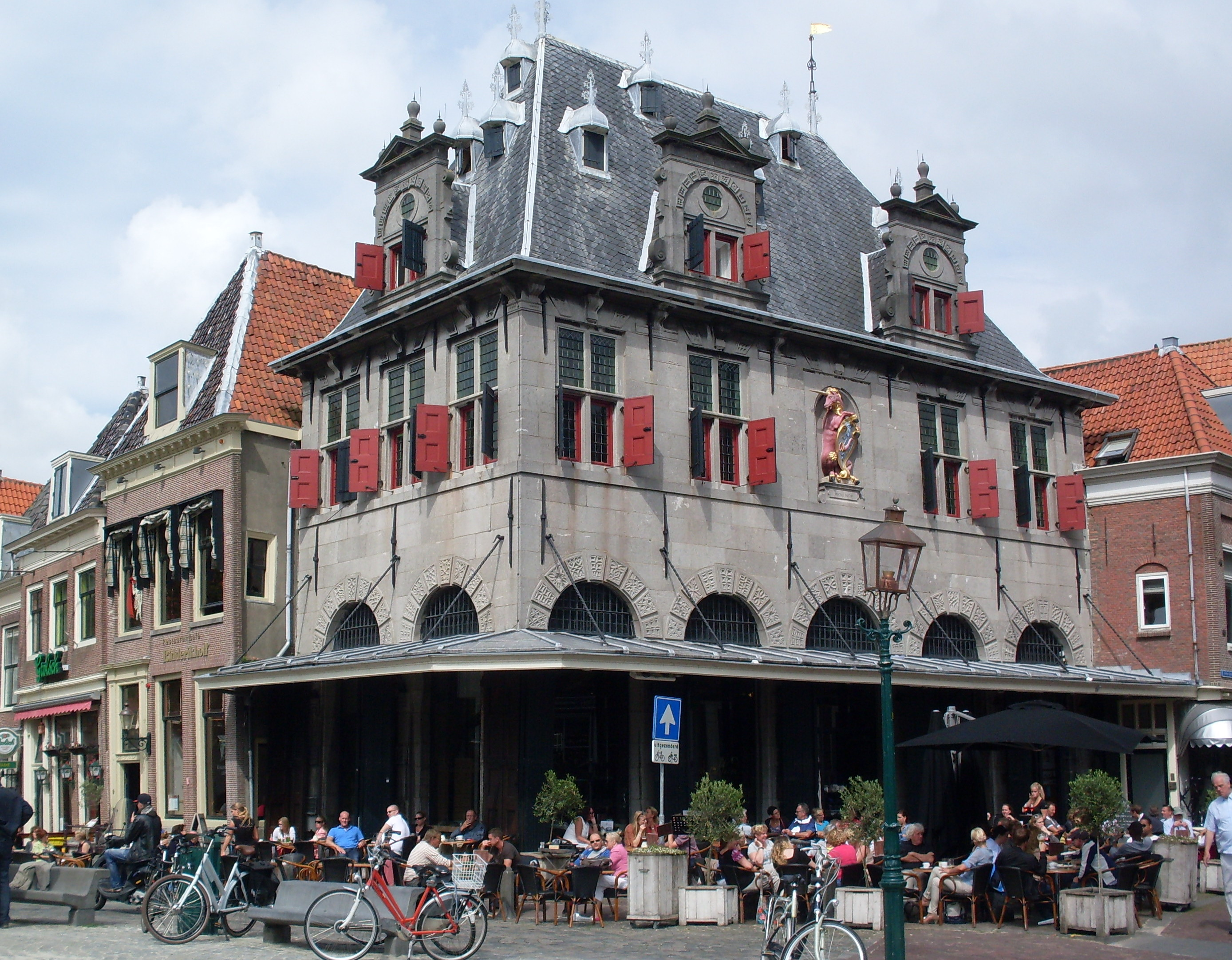
Hoorn Weigh house

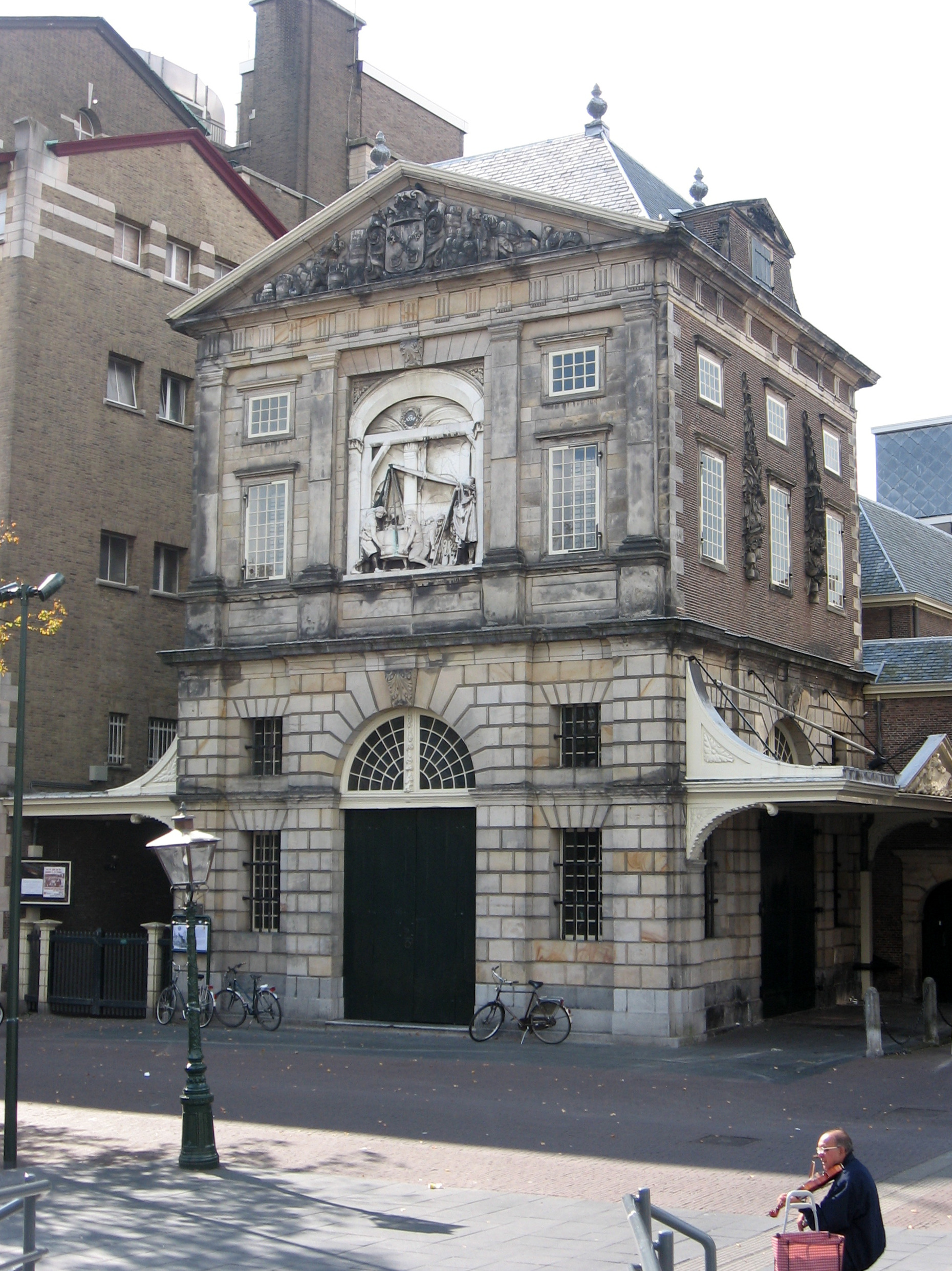
Leiden Weigh house

- Weigh house of Alkmaar (1582, originally a Holy Spirit Hospital)
- Weigh house of Amersfoort (1622–1865)
- Weigh house of Amsterdam (1565–1808, precedent)
- Weigh house of Amsterdam (1620–1857 on the Westermarket)
- St. Antonies Weigh house in Amsterdam (1488, city gate called "St. Antoniespoort")
- Amsterdam (1655, city gate called "Regulierspoort")
- Weigh house of Arnhem (1761, tower type)
- Weigh house of Bergen op Zoom (1751)
- Weigh house of Breda (1659–1865)
- Weigh house of Brielle (1623)
- Weigh house of Brouwershaven (1646)
- Weigh house of Buren (1612)
- Weigh house of Delfshaven (?)
- Weigh house of Delft (16th century)
- Weigh house of Den Haag (after 1650)
- Weigh house of Deventer (1528)
- Weigh house of Doesburg (around 15th century)
- Weigh house for iron in Dordrecht (1325)
- Weigh house of Dokkum (1593)
- Weigh house of Dordrecht (1360)
- Weigh house of Edam (1778)
- Weigh house of Elburg (?–1854), city gate called "Goor gate")
- Weigh house of Enkhuizen (1559, dwelling).
- Weigh house of Franeker (1657, drive through type)
- Weigh house of Gouda (1668, synthesis type)
- Weigh house of Groenlo (16th century)
- Weigh house of Groningen (1660–1874, drive through type)
- Weigh house of Haarlem (1598, tower type)
- Weigh house of Hattem (1621)
- Weigh house of Hoorn (1609, loggia type)
- Weigh house of Ijsselstein (1779)
- Weigh house of Kampem (?, city gate called "Veene gate")
- Weigh house of Leeuwarden (1598, drive through type)
- Weigh house of Leiden (1658, synthesis type)
- Weigh house of Lochem (after 1640)
- Weigh house for wool in Maastricht (1721)
- Weigh house of Makkum (1698, tower type)
- Weigh house of Medemblik (17th century)
- Weigh house of Meppel (1617)
- Weigh house of Middelburg (1523)
- Weigh house of Monnickendam (1669, loggia type)
- Weigh house of Montfoort (1615 – 20th century)
- Weigh house of Nieuwpoort (1697)
- Weigh house of Nijmegen (1612)
- Weigh house of Oudewater (1595)
- Weigh house of Schiedam (1572)
- Weigh house of Schoonhoven (1617)
- Weigh house of Purmerend (1744–1883)
- Weigh house of Rhenen (1738–1960s)
- Weigh house of Rotterdam (1703–1827, loggia type)
- Weigh house for butter in Rotterdam (1619)
- Weigh house of Sneek (17th century)
- Weigh house of Steenwijk (1642)
- Weigh house of Utrecht (1410)
- Weigh house of Vianen (17th century)
- Weigh house of Vlaardingen (around 1609)
- Weigh house of Workum (1650, drive through type)
- Weigh house of Zaltbommel (1798)

== Poland ==
- Weigh house of Krakow (second half of the 14th century – ca.1875, "Wielka Waga Miejska")
- Weigh house of Nysa (1606, wooden scale in front of a store house)
- Weigh house of Poznan (1534, annex town hall)
- Weigh house of Wroclaw (small structure in front of the trade hall from 1242)

== Suriname ==
- Weigh house of Paramaribo (1824)

== Switzerland ==
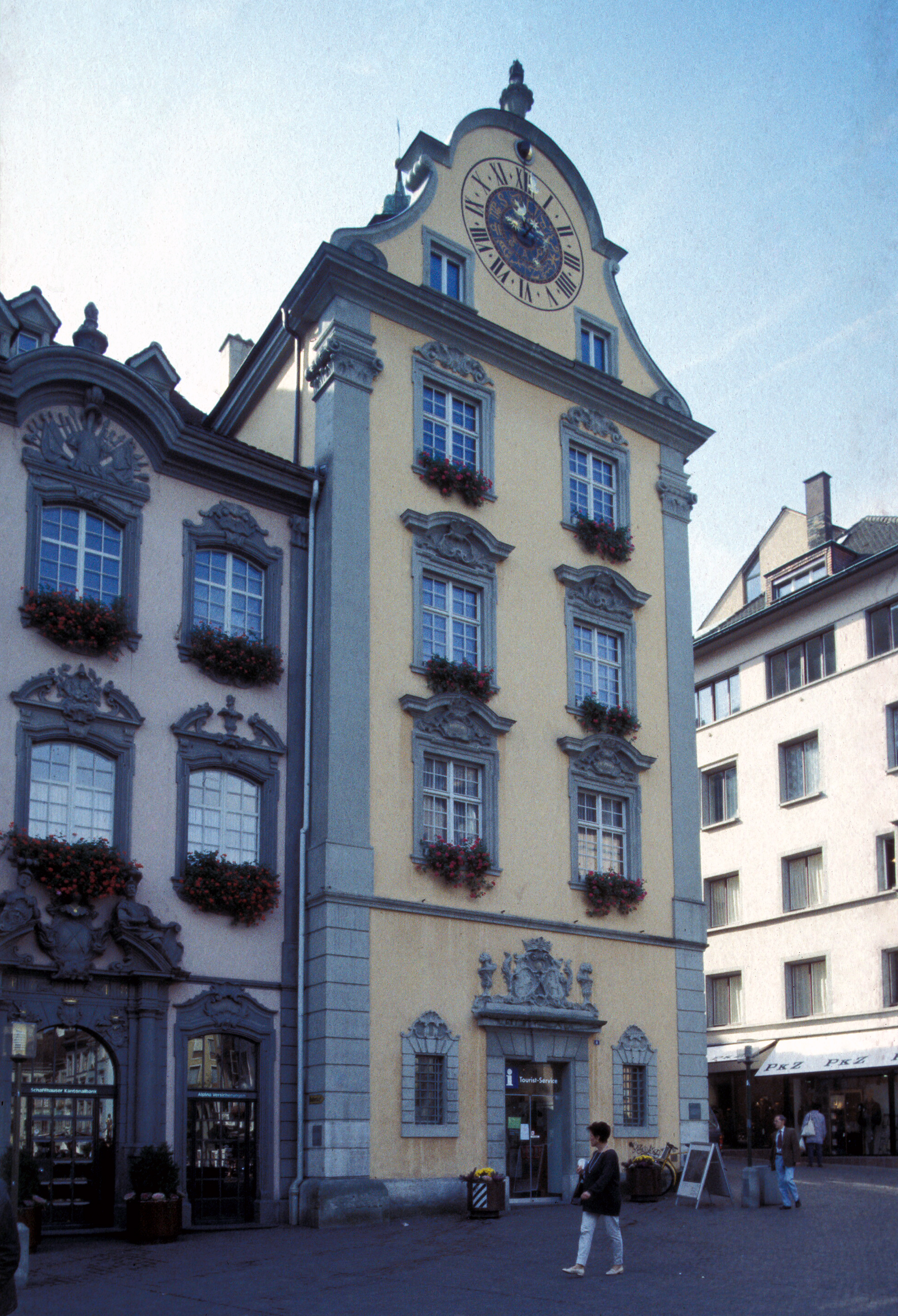
Schaffhausen Weigh house

- Weigh tower of Schaffhausen (1747, patrician house, called "Fronwaagturm")
- Weigh house of St. Gallen (1585, trade hall)
- Winterthur (1503)

== Literature and external link ==
- Karl Kiem: Die Waage. Ein Bautyp des »Goldenen Jahrhunderts« in Holland, Berlin 2009. ISBN 978-3-7861-2605-8. (Englisch edition from 2019 Online as PDF available).
