= Snelrewaard =

- Hamlet
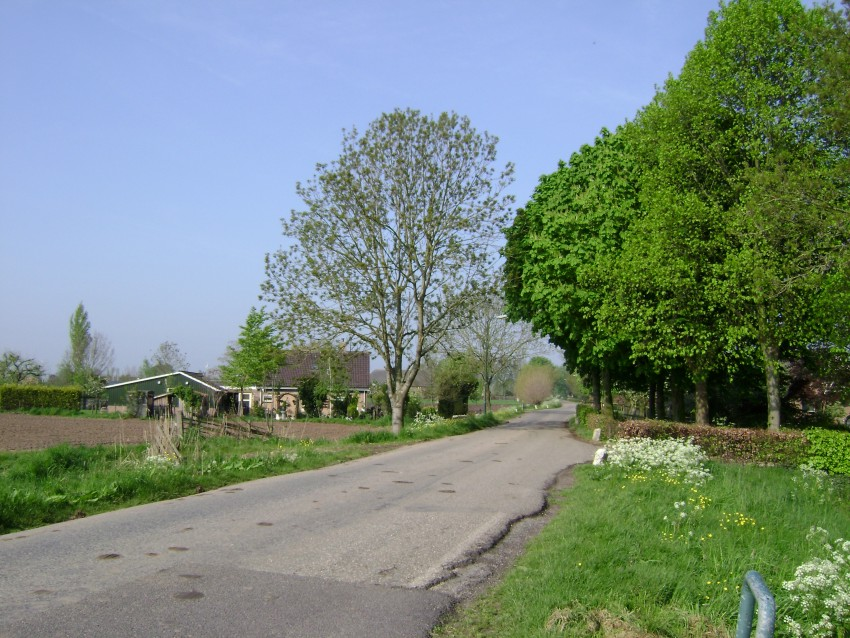
- Street view

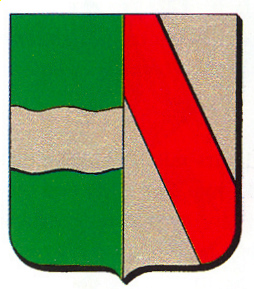
- Coat of arms

- Location in the Netherlands Snelrewaard (Netherlands)
- Coordinates: 52°1′59″N 4°55′1″E
- Country: Netherlands
- Province: Utrecht
- Municipality: Oudewater; Montfoort

Area
  - Total: 9.72 km^{2} (3.75 sq mi)
- Elevation: −0.1 m (−0.33 ft)

Population (2021)
  - Total: 780
  - Density: 80/km^{2} (210/sq mi)
- Time zone: UTC+1 (CET)
  - Summer (DST): UTC+2 (CEST)
- Postal code: 3425
- Dialing code: 0348

Snelrewaard is a hamlet in the Dutch province of Utrecht. It is a part of the municipality of Oudewater, and lies about 2 km east of the city of Oudewater. A small part of the hamlet is in Montfoort.

Snelrewaard was a separate municipality from 1817 to 1989, when it was merged with Oudewater.

It was first mentioned around 1307 as Snoyelrewaert, and means "land near water belonging to Snel (polder)". Snelrewaard has place name signs. In 1840, it was home to 140 people.

== Gallery ==
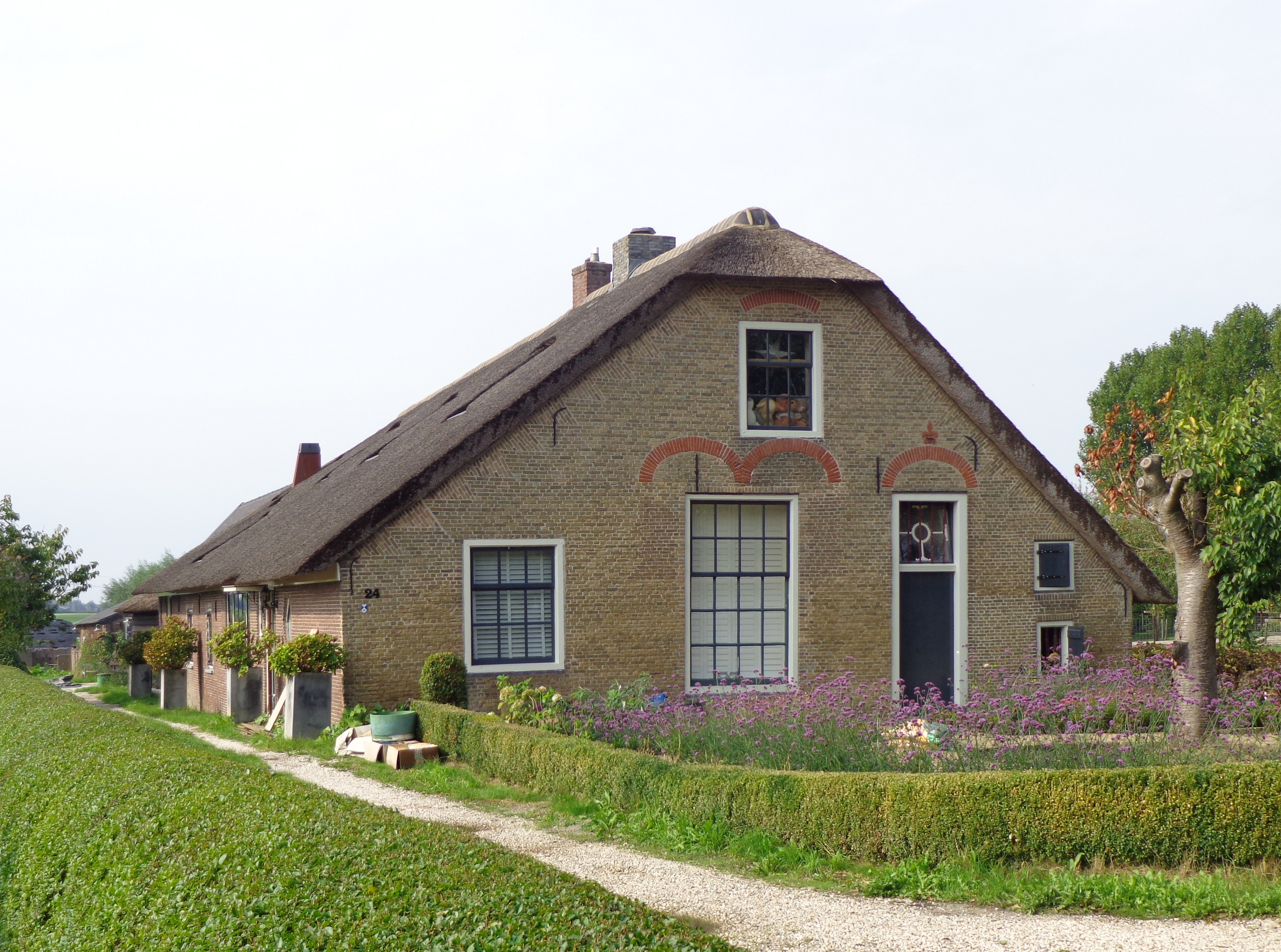
Farm in Snelrewaard

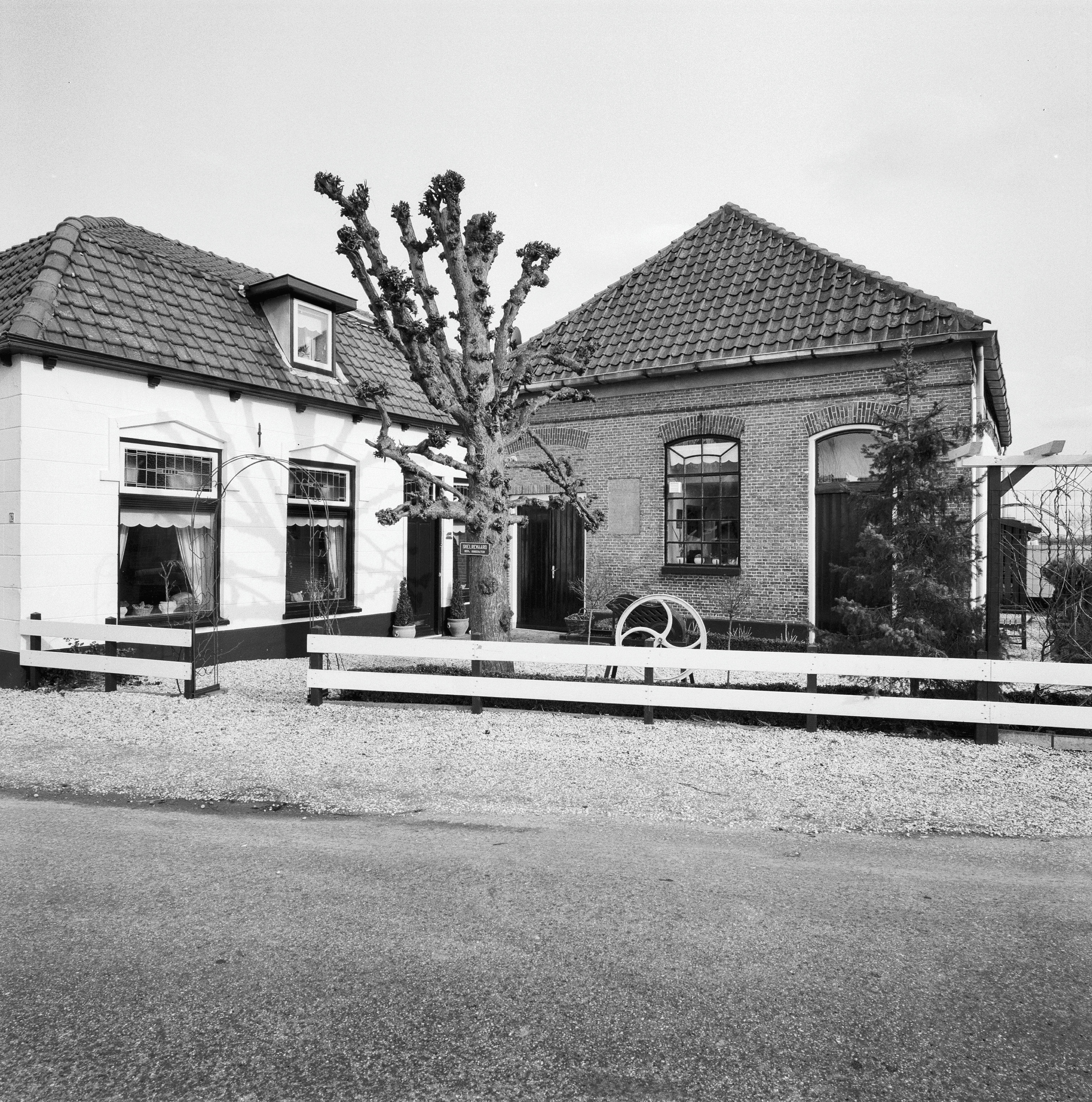
Farm in Snelrewaard

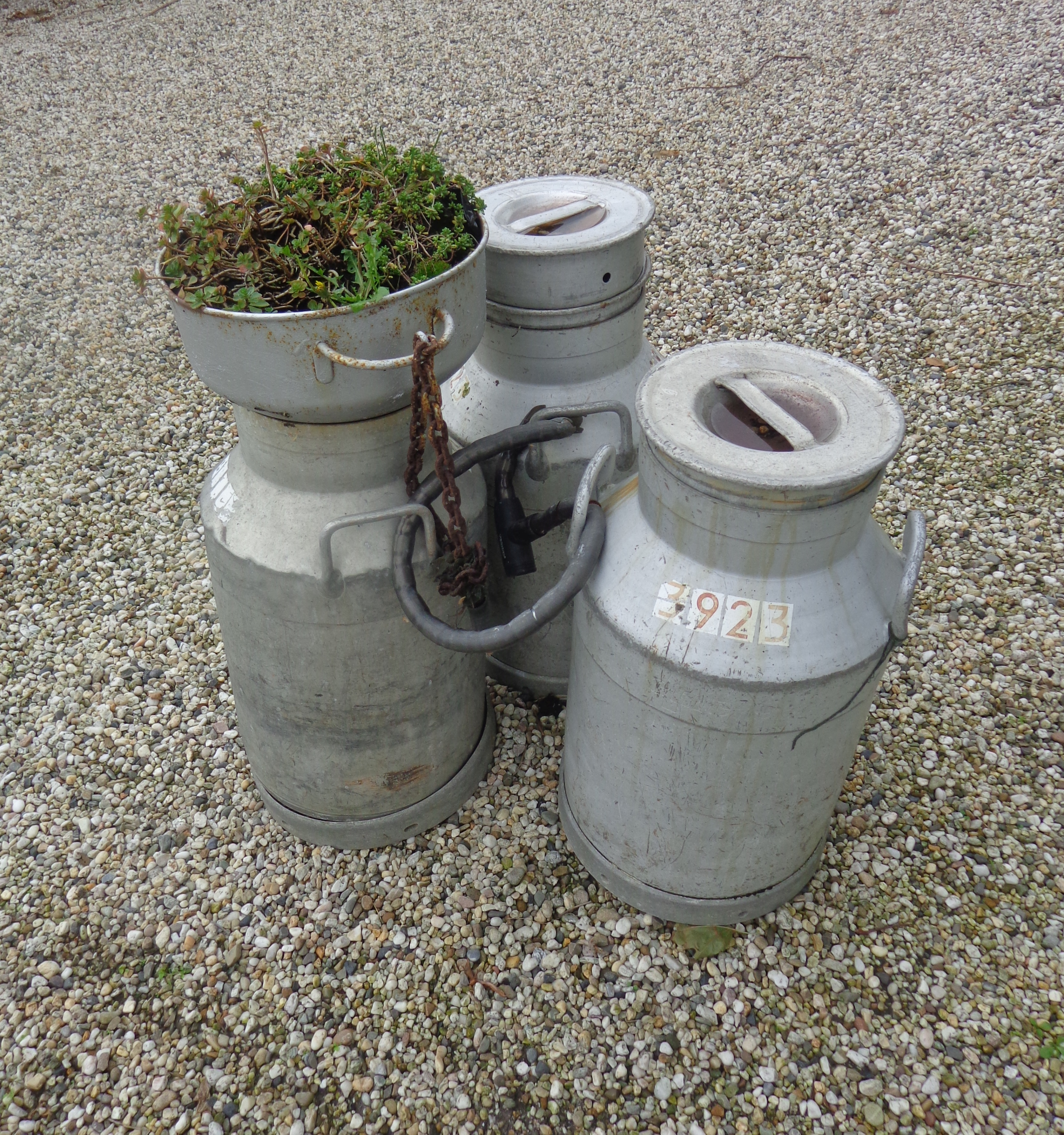
Milk churns
