= Achthoven =

Achthoven is the name of three villages in the Netherlands:

- Achthoven, Leiderdorp, in the province of South Holland
- Achthoven, Montfoort, in the province of Utrecht
- Achthoven, Vijfheerenlanden, in the province of Utrecht
