= Heeswijk (disambiguation) =

Heeswijk may refer to:

- Heeswijk, a town in North Brabant, the Netherlands
- Heeswijk (Cuijk), a hamlet in North Brabant, the Netherlands
- Heeswijk (Utrecht), a hamlet in the Netherlands

== See also ==
- van Heeswijk
