= Achthoven, Utrecht =

Achthoven is the name of two villages in the province of Utrecht, the Netherlands:

- Achthoven, Montfoort
- Achthoven, Vijfheerenlanden
