= Cattenbroek =

- Hamlet
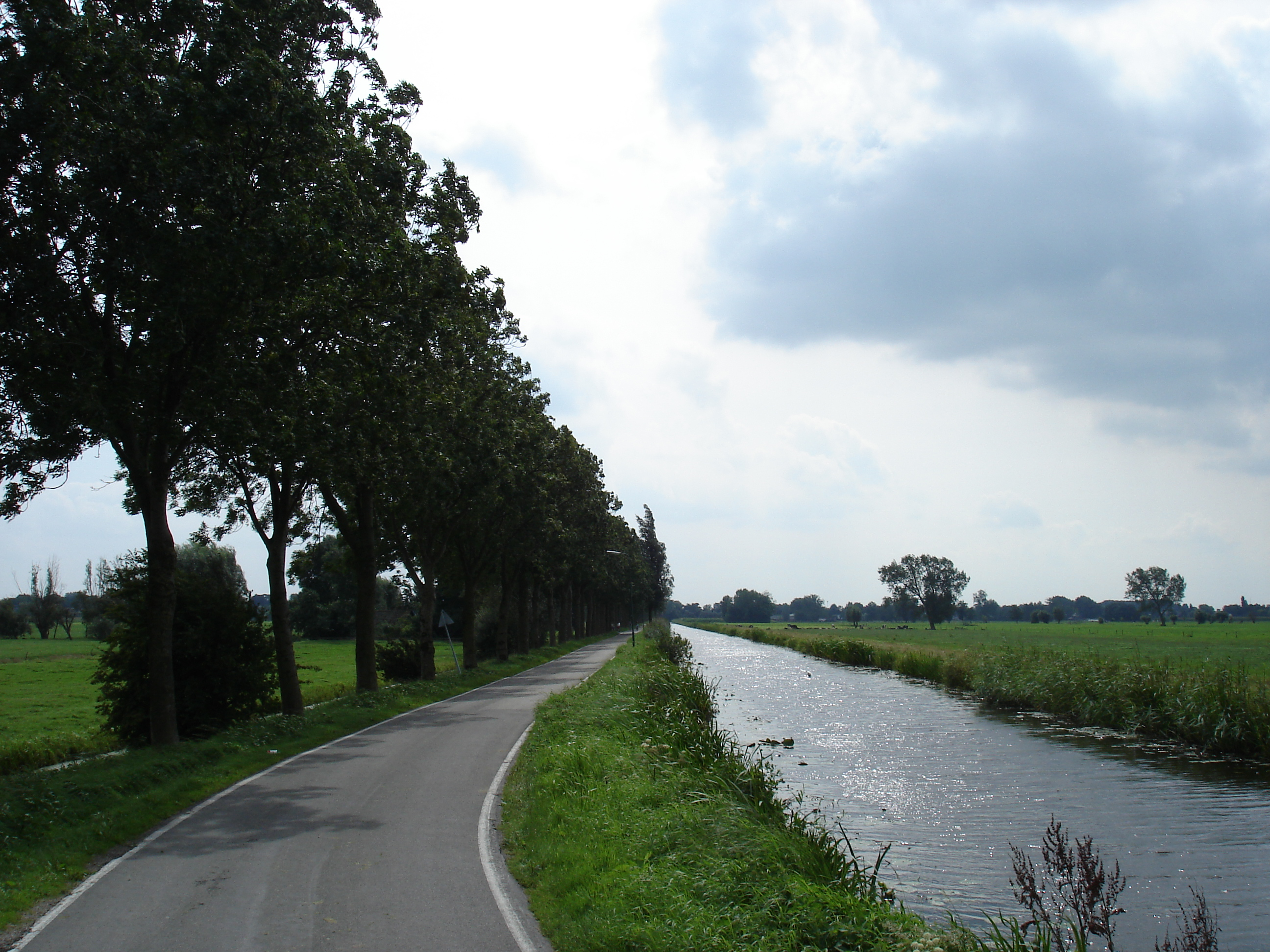
- Cattenbroekerdijk (dike)

- Location in the Netherlands Cattenbroek (Netherlands)
- Coordinates: 52°3′50″N 4°56′20″E
- Country: Netherlands
- Province: Utrecht
- Municipality: Montfoort

Area
  - Total: 4.16 km^{2} (1.61 sq mi)

Population (2021)
  - Total: 85
  - Density: 20/km^{2} (53/sq mi)
- Time zone: UTC+1 (CET)
  - Summer (DST): UTC+2 (CEST)
- Postal code: 3461
- Dialing code: 0348

Cattenbroek is a hamlet in the Dutch province of Utrecht. It is a part of the municipality of Montfoort, and lies about 4 km east of Woerden.

The hamlet was first mentioned in 1217 as Cattenbroec, and means inferior swampy land. The postal authorities have placed it under Linschoten. Cattenbroek does not have place name signs. In 1840, it was home to 75 people. There is a public beach on the lake near Cattenbroek.

== Gallery ==
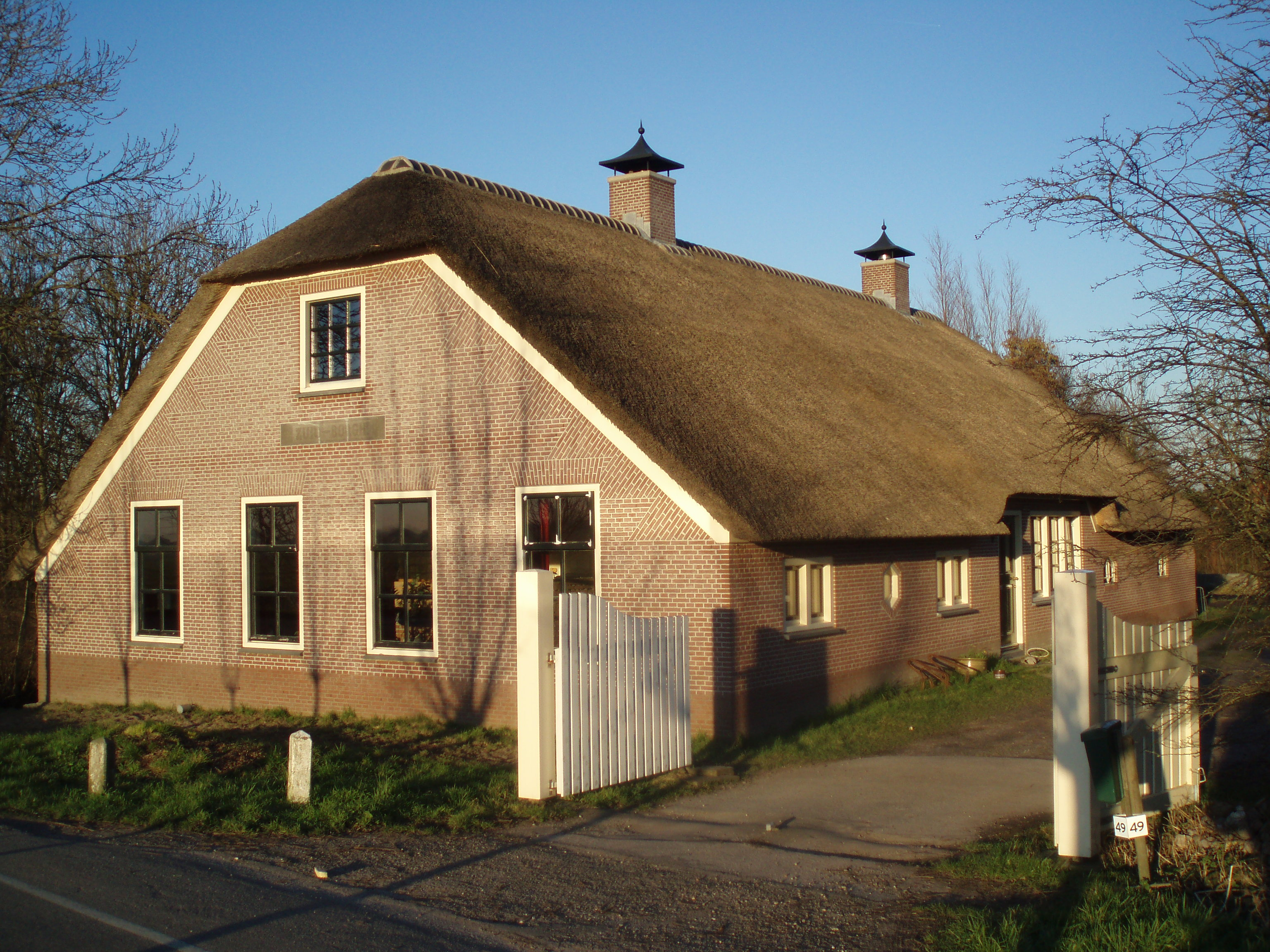
Farm in Cattenbroek

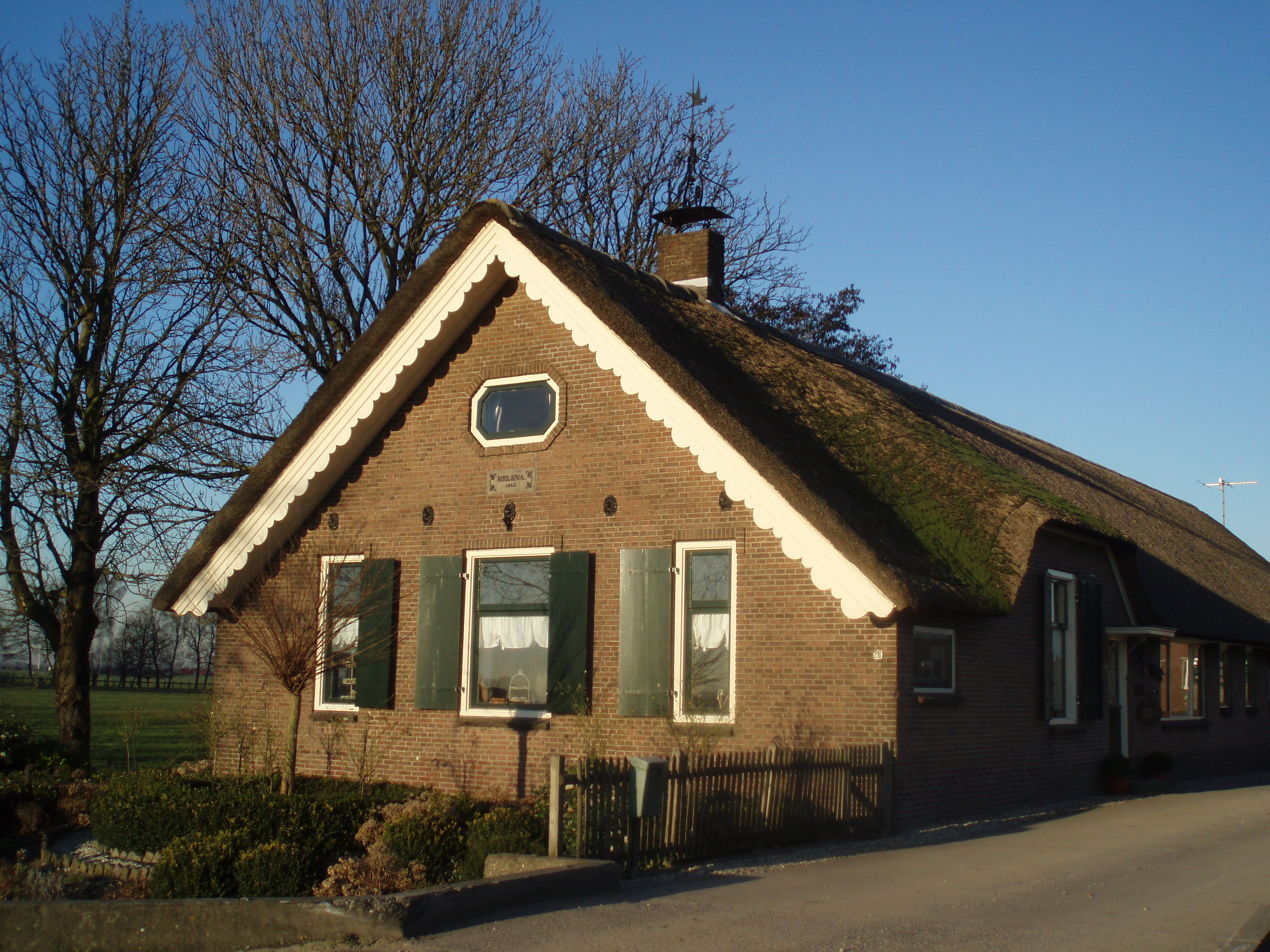
Farm Helena in Cattenbroek

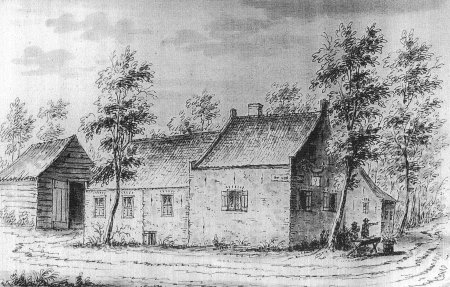
Drawing of inn De Lindeboom (1729)

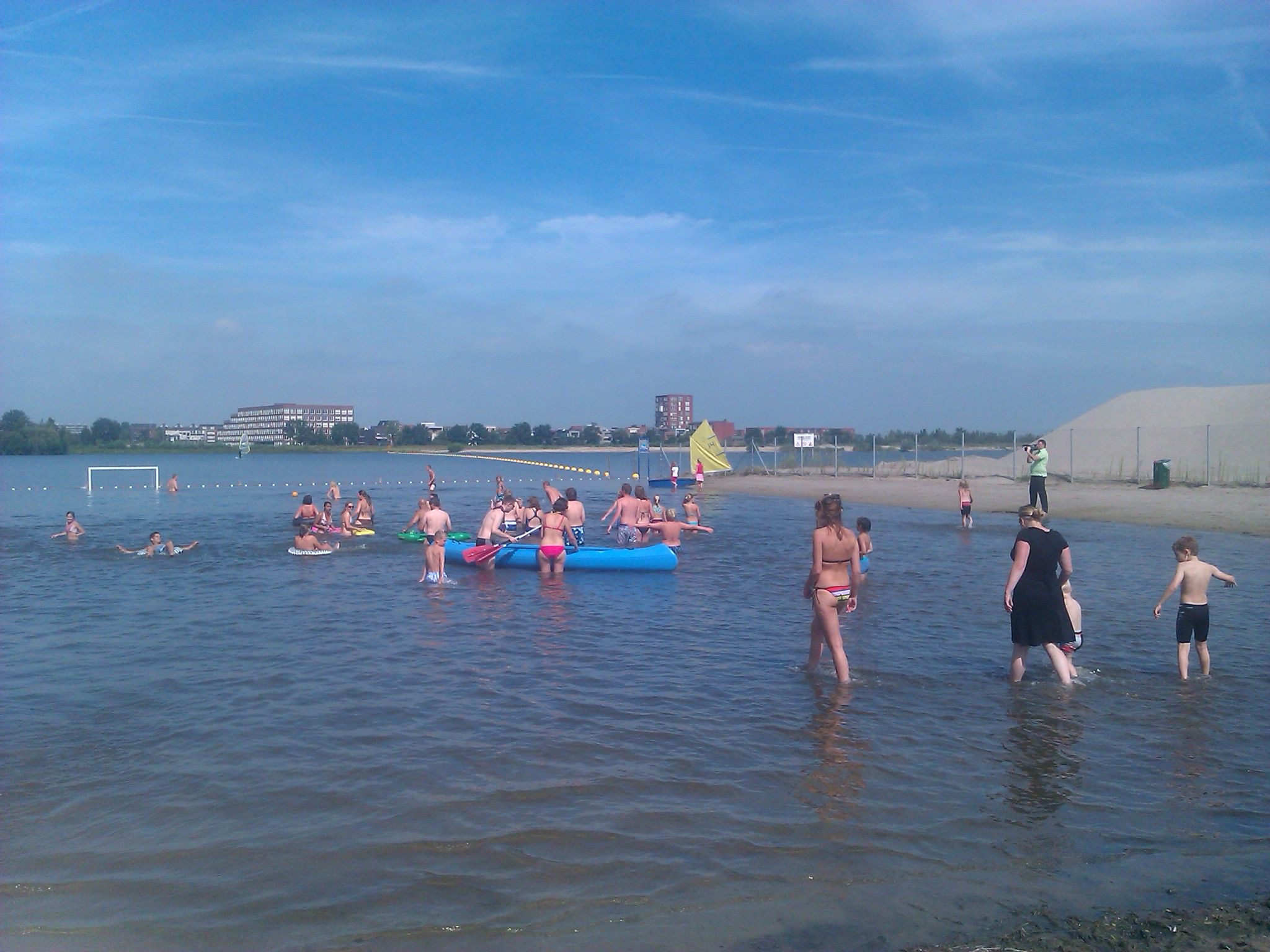
Lake and beach near Cattenbroek
