= Blokland, Utrecht =

Blokland
- Hamlet
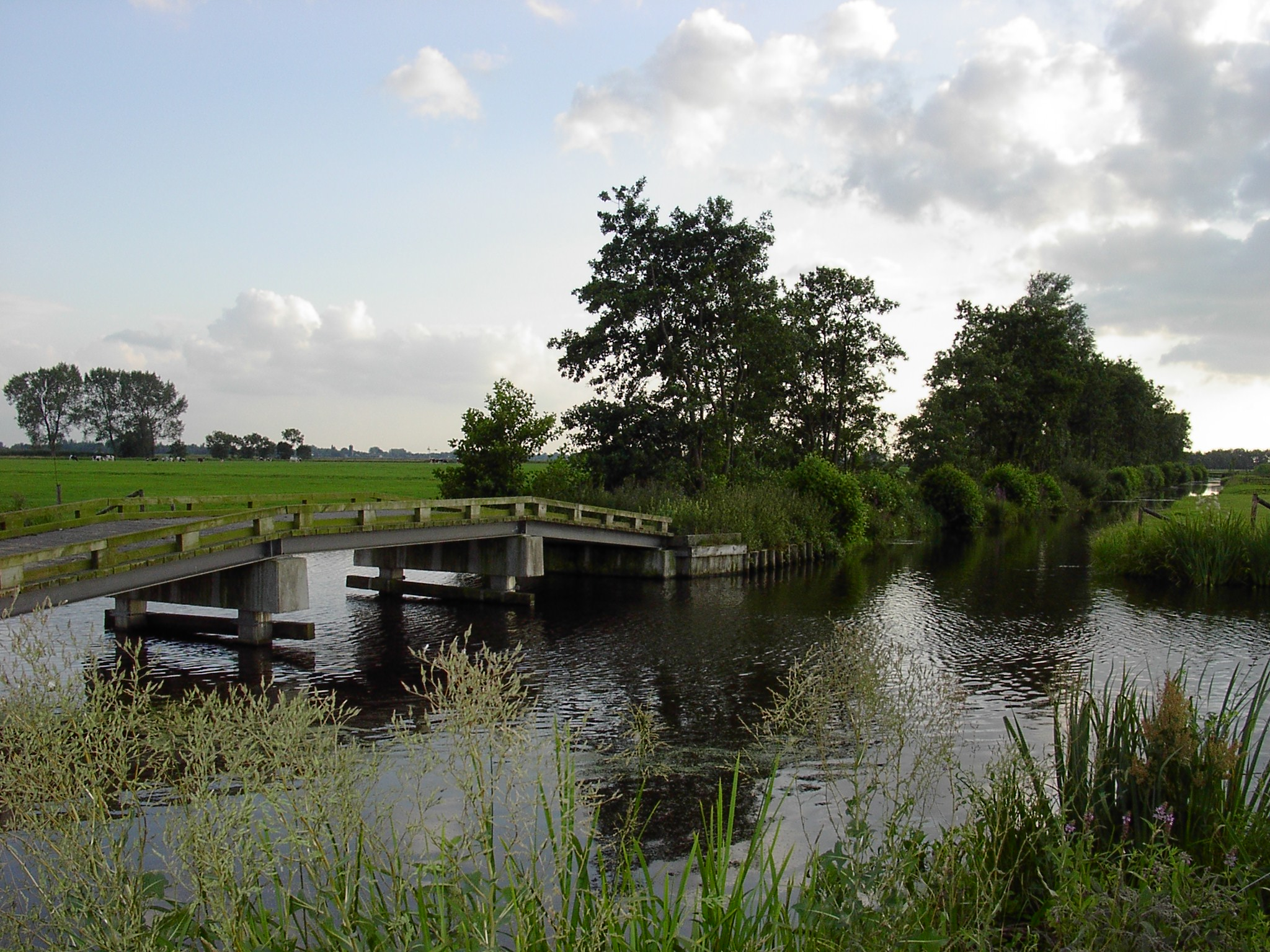
- The Bloklandse Dijk

- Location in the Netherlands Blokland (Netherlands)
- Coordinates: 52°1′47″N 4°57′37″E
- Country: Netherlands
- Province: Utrecht
- Municipality: Montfoort

Area
  - Total: 0.73 km^{2} (0.28 sq mi)

Population (2021)
  - Total: 140
  - Density: 190/km^{2} (500/sq mi)
- Time zone: UTC+1 (CET)
  - Summer (DST): UTC+2 (CEST)
- Postal code: 3417
- Dialing code: 0348

Blokland is a hamlet in the Dutch province of Utrecht. It is a part of the municipality of Montfoort, and lies about 1 km southeast of that city, and 6 km west of IJsselstein. Blokland has a population of around 160.

Blokland was a heerlijkheid (manor), covering the entire polder "Blokland", which is the area south of the Bloklandse Dijk.

When the current municipal system was introduced in the Netherlands in 1812, Blokland became part of the municipality Montfoort for a short while. It was part of the municipality of Willeskop between 1818 and 1989, when that municipality was merged with Montfoort.

The hamlet was first mentioned in 1261 as Blokelant, and means enclosed land. The postal authorities have placed it under Montfoort. Blokland has no place name signs. In 1840, it was home to 142 people.

== Gallery ==
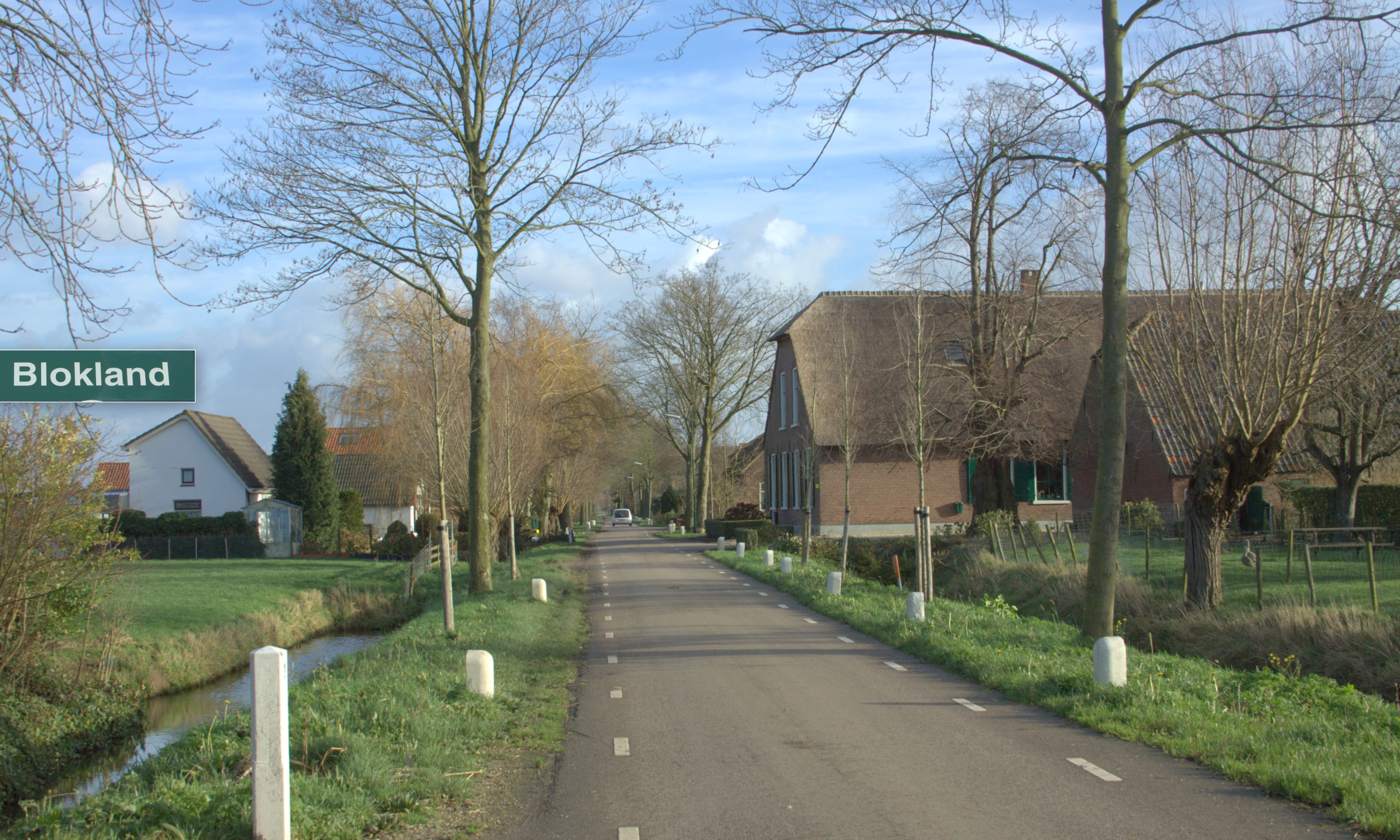
Street view

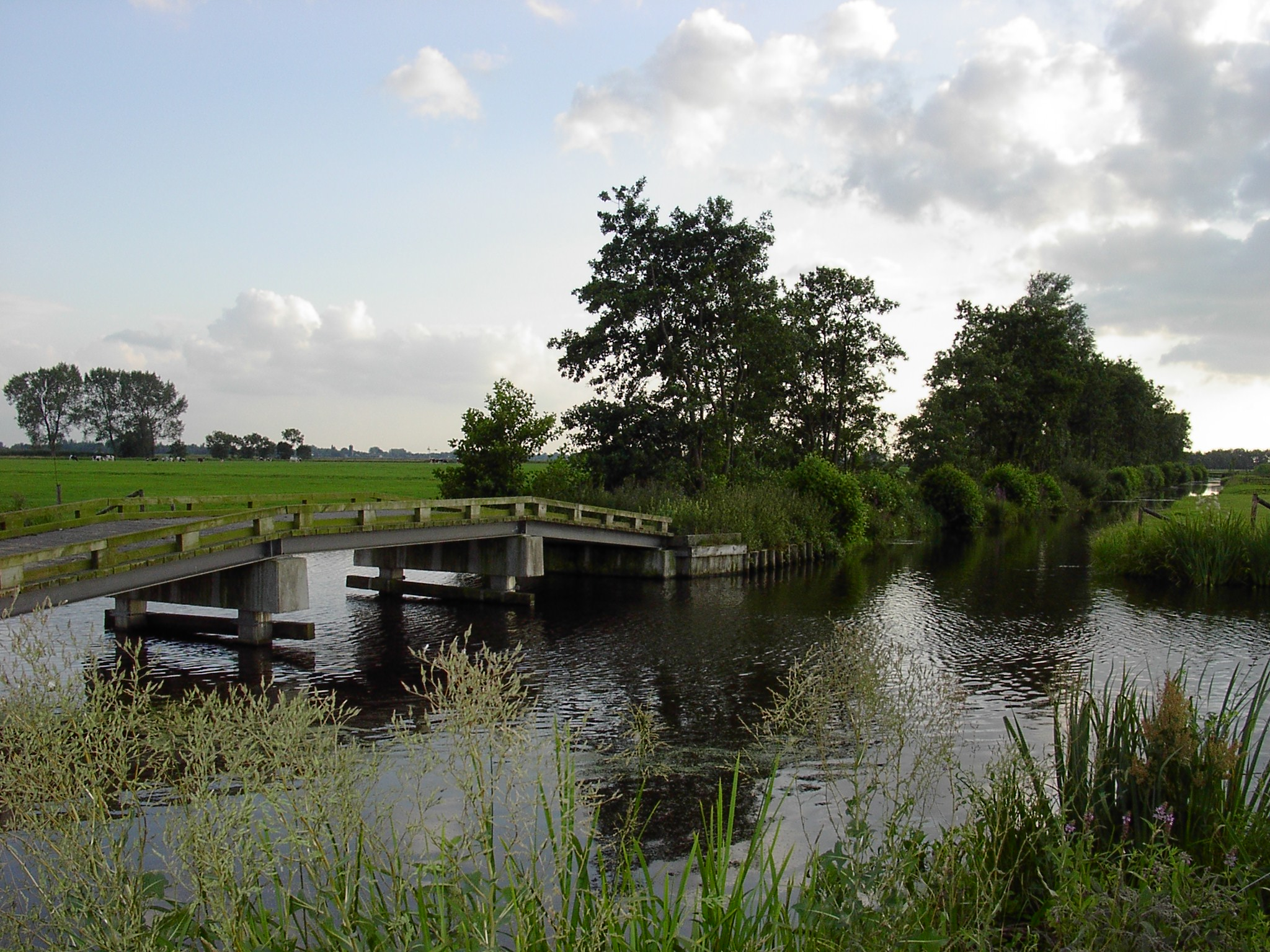
Landscape
