= Montfoort =

- Municipality
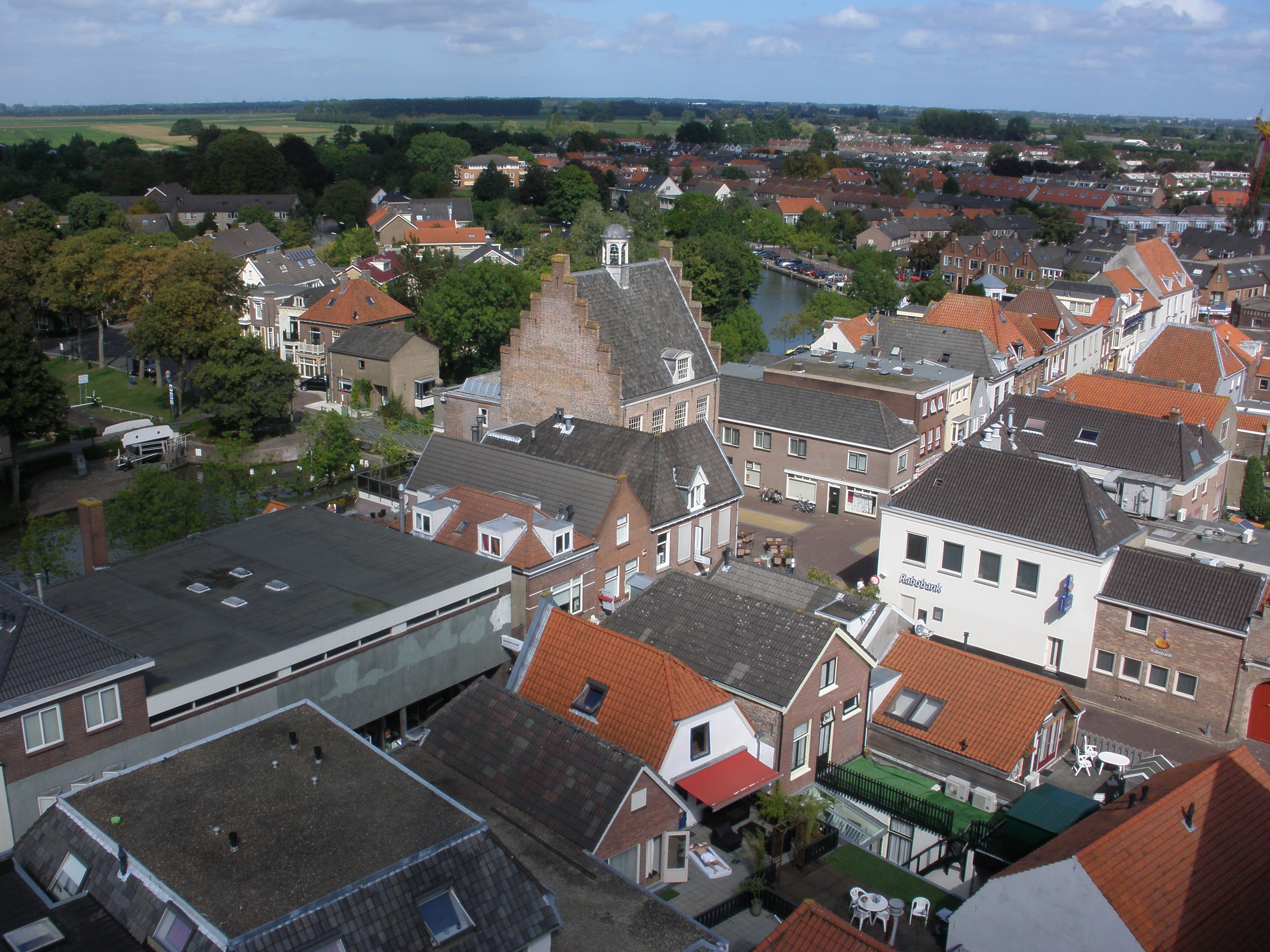
- Montfoort city centre

- Flag Coat of arms

- Location in Utrecht
- Coordinates: 52°3′N 4°57′E
- Country: Netherlands
- Province: Utrecht

Government
  - Body: Municipal council
  - Mayor: Petra van Hartskamp (VVD)

Area
  - Total: 38.20 km^{2} (14.75 sq mi)
  - Land: 37.57 km^{2} (14.51 sq mi)
  - Water: 0.63 km^{2} (0.24 sq mi)
- Elevation: 2 m (6.6 ft)

Population (January 2021)
  - Total: 13,896
  - Density: 370/km^{2} (960/sq mi)
- Time zone: UTC+1 (CET)
  - Summer (DST): UTC+2 (CEST)
- Postcode: 3417, 3460–3461
- Area code: 0348
- Website: www.montfoort.nl

Montfoort (Dutch pronunciation: [ˈmɔntfoːrt]) is a municipality and a city in the Netherlands, in the province of Utrecht. Montfoort received city rights in 1329.

== Population centres ==
The municipality of Montfoort consists of the following cities, towns, villages and/or districts:

- Achthoven
- Achthoven-Oost
- Blokland
- Cattenbroek
- Heeswijk
- Knollemanshoek
- Linschoten
- Mastwijk
- Montfoort
- Willeskop

=== Topography ===
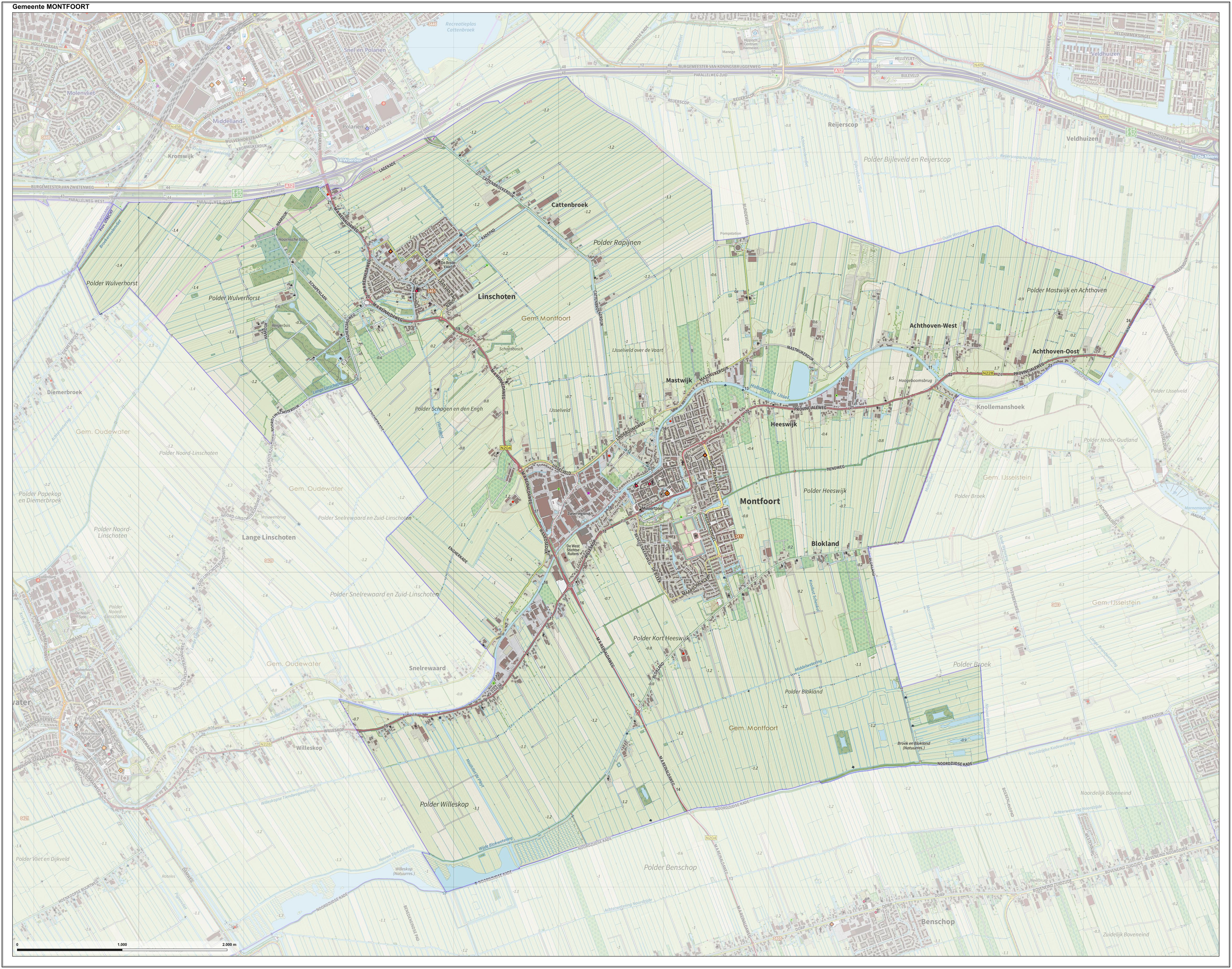

Dutch topographic map of the municipality of Montfoort, June 2015

== Notable people ==
- Jan III van Montfoort (ca.1448 – 1522) a leader of the Hook Party in the Bishopric of Utrecht
- Anthonie Blocklandt van Montfoort (1533 or 1534 - 1583) a Dutch painter
- Isbrand van Diemerbroeck (1609–1674) a Dutch physician, anatomist and professor
- Matthew Maty (1718–1776) a physician and writer, secretary of the Royal Society and librarian of the British Museum
- Mark van Eldik (born 1967) a Dutch rally driver

== Gallery ==
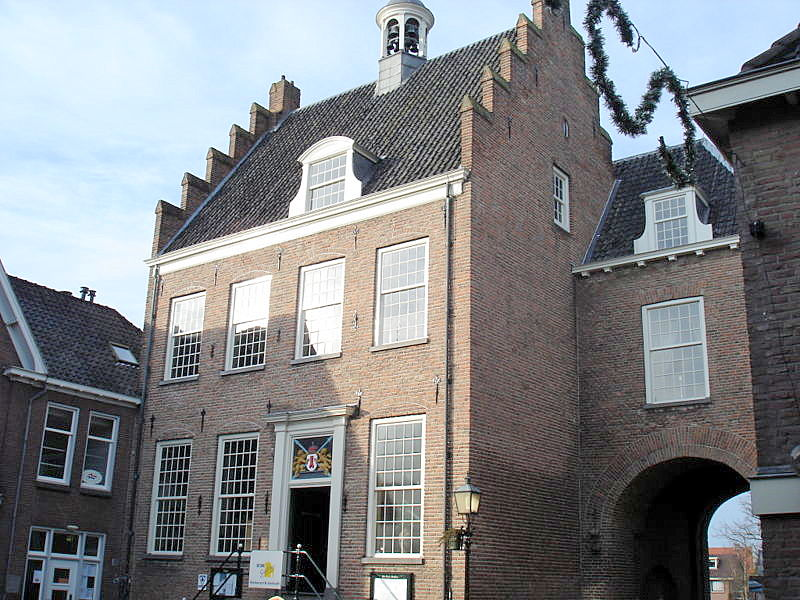
Old town hall of Montfoort

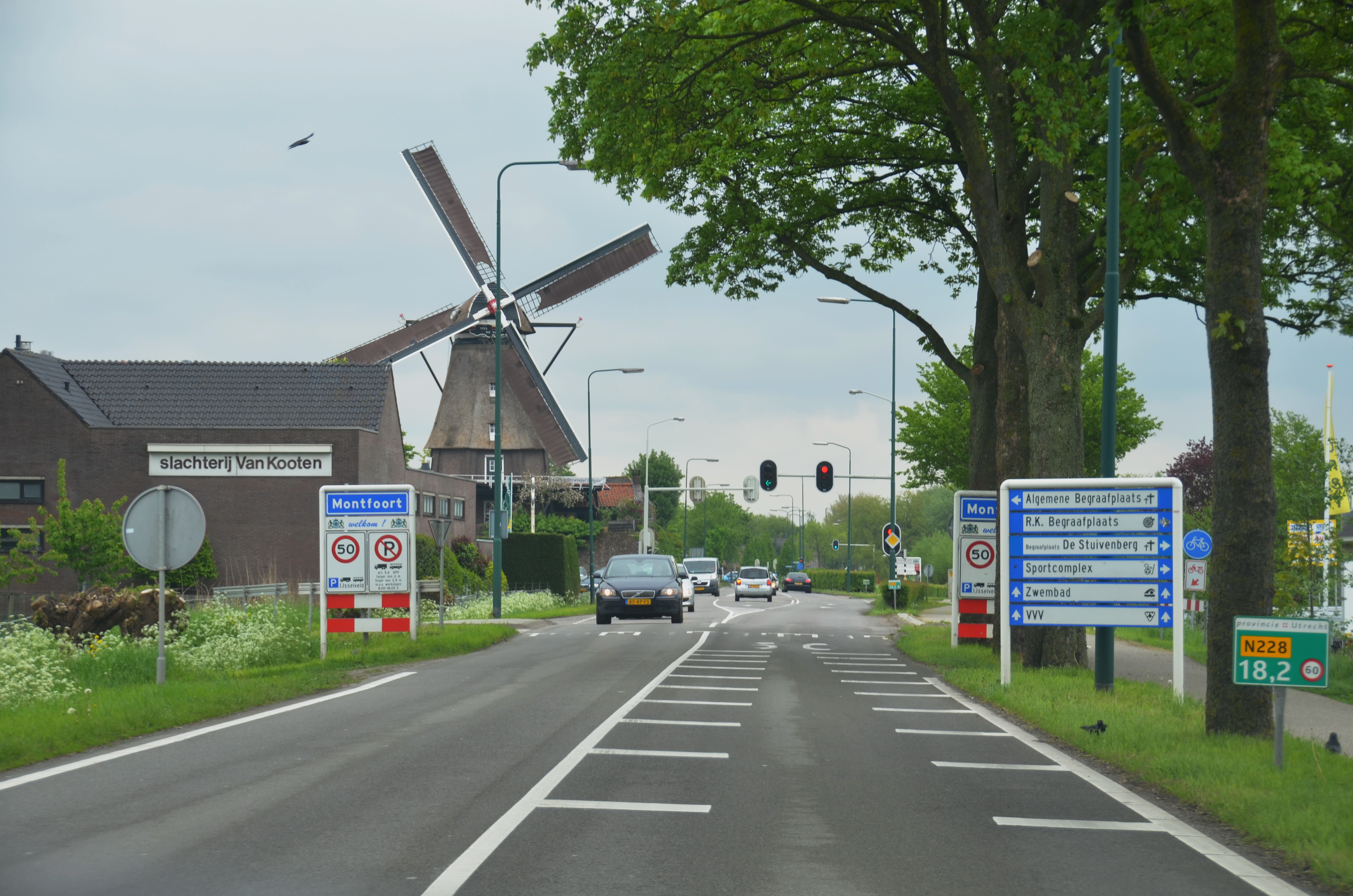
Montfoort Utrecht with the still working flourmill

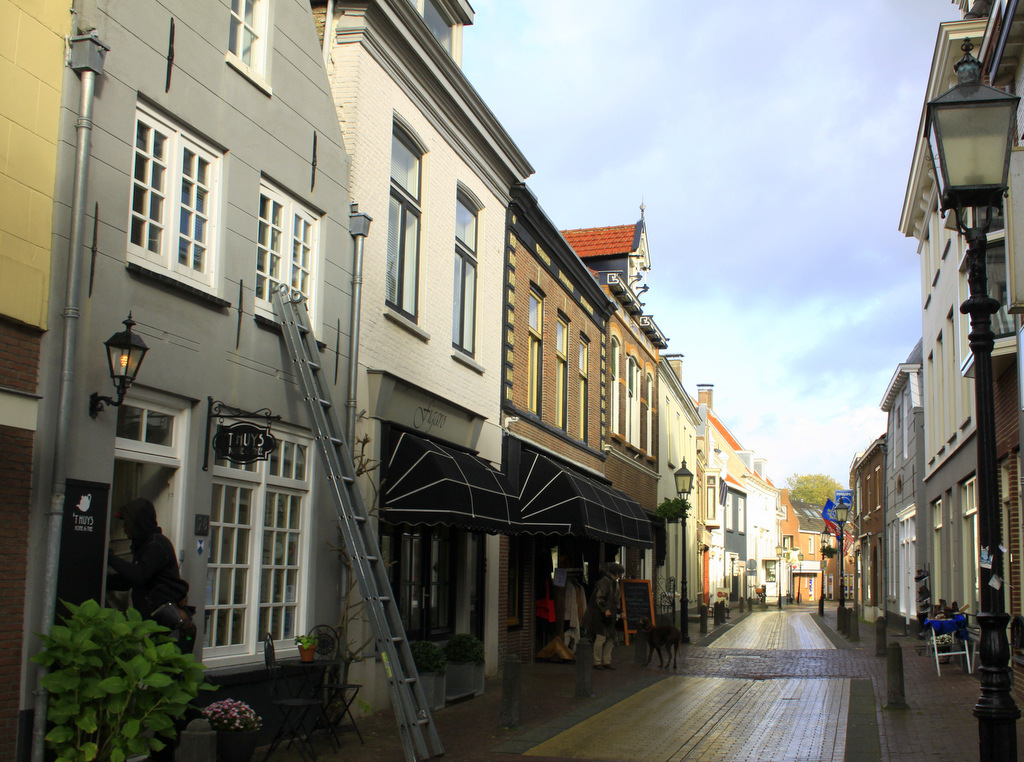
De Hoogstraat de oudste en belangrijkste straat van Montfoort

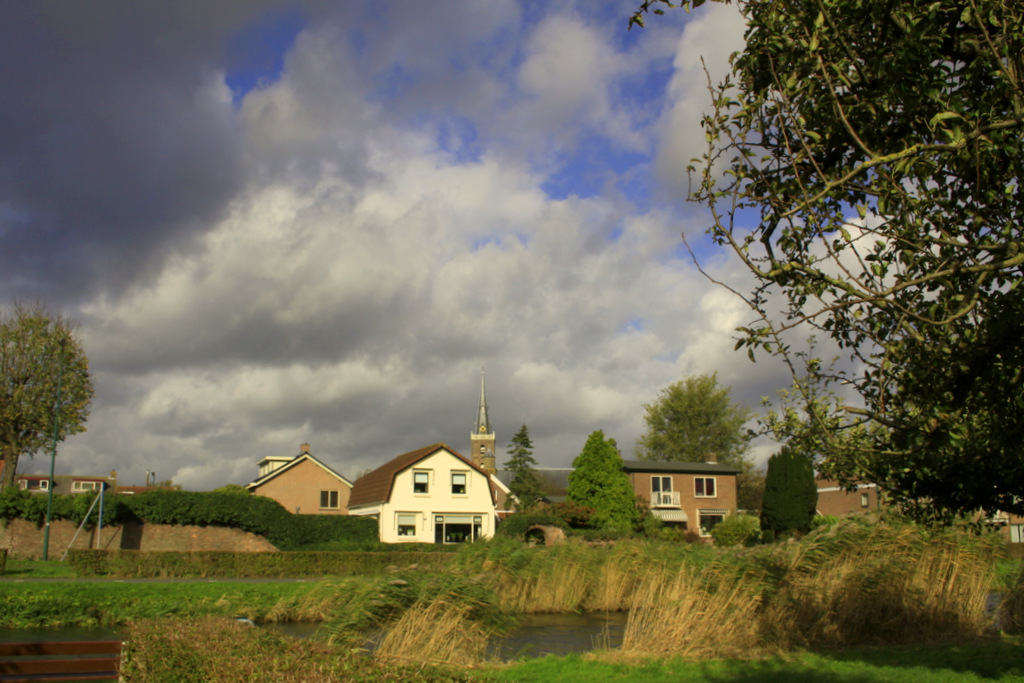
View to Montfoort

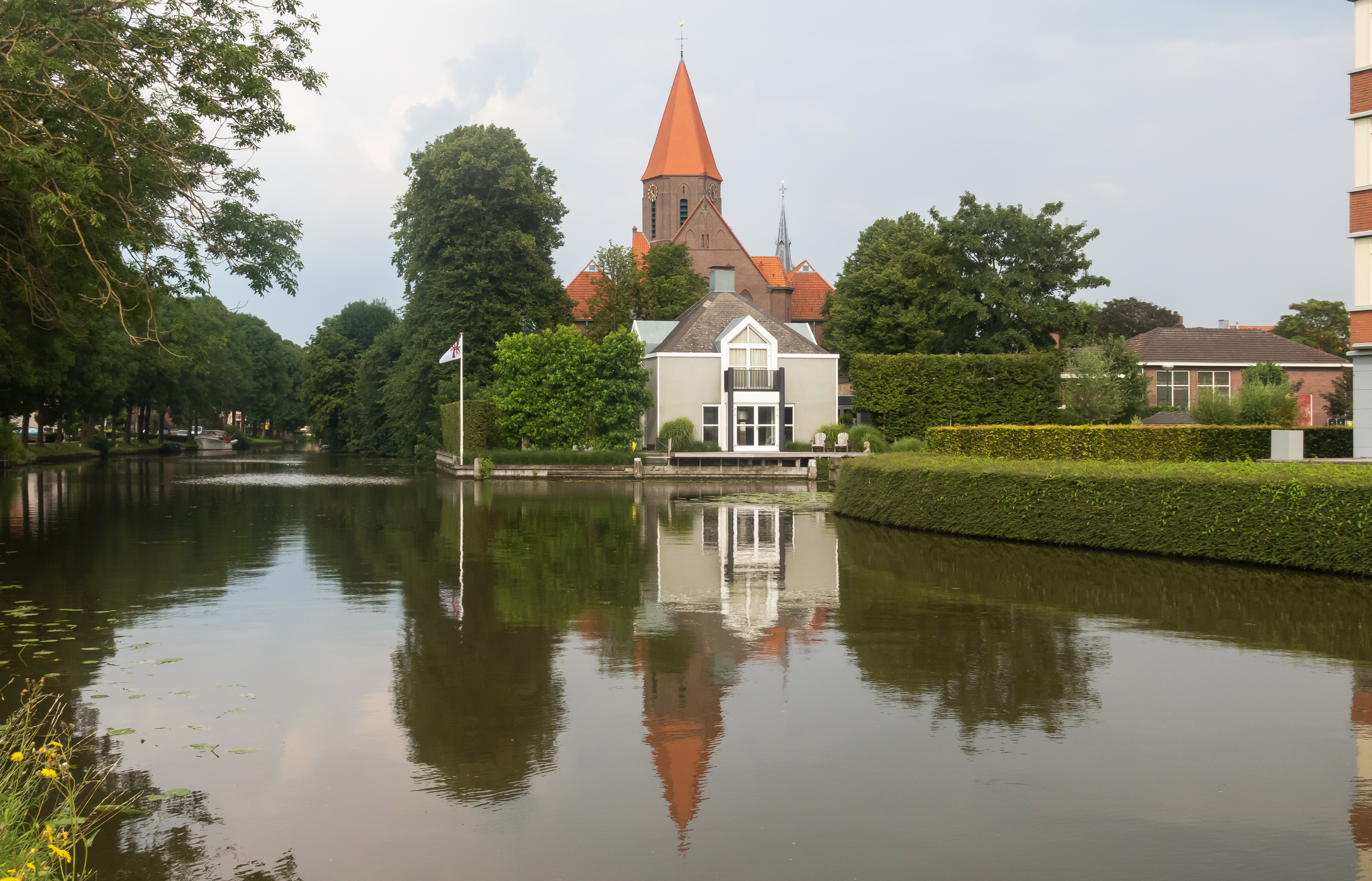
Montfoort, church: kerk Johannes de Doper

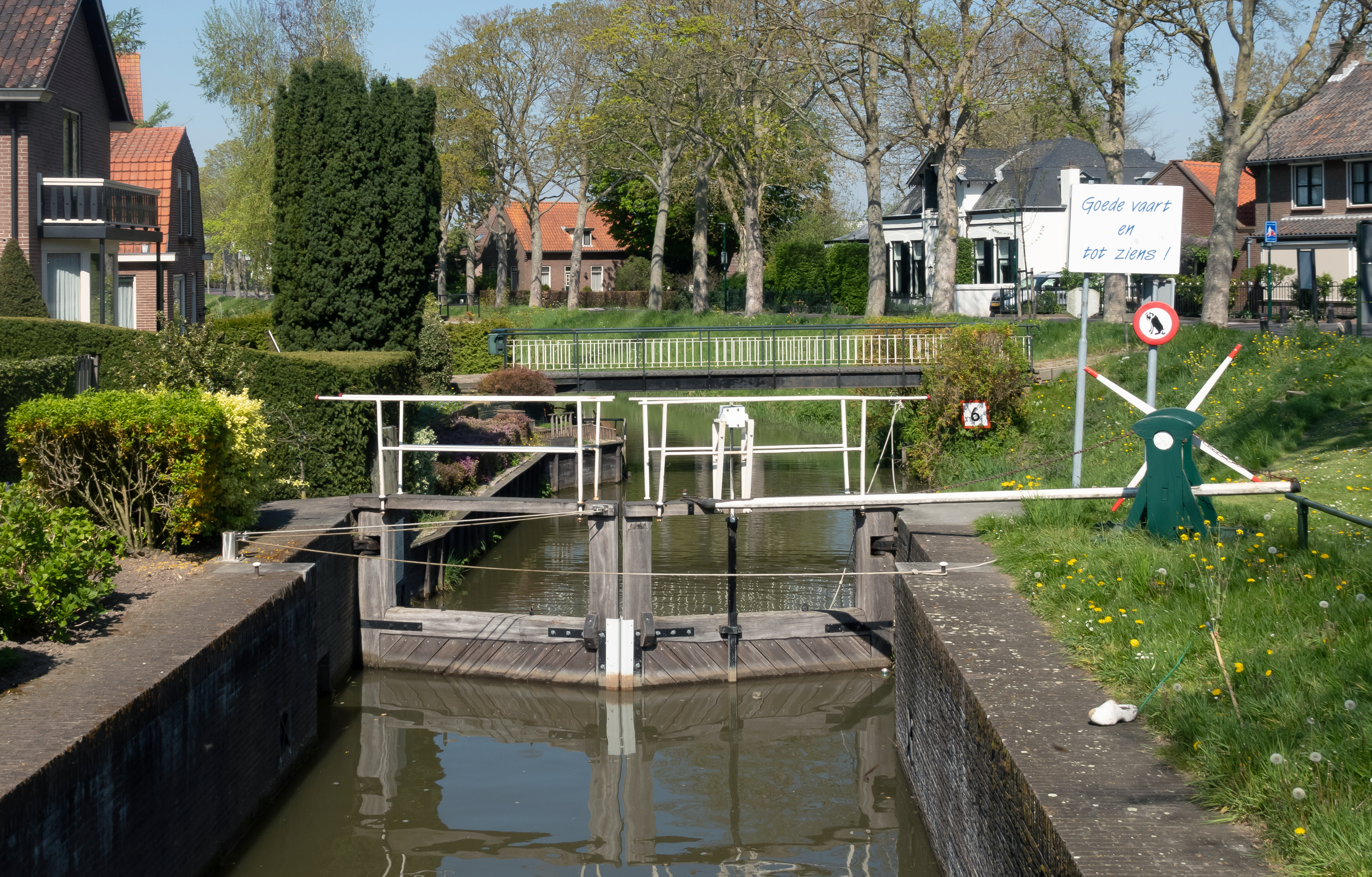
Lock: schutsluis Montfoortse Vaart

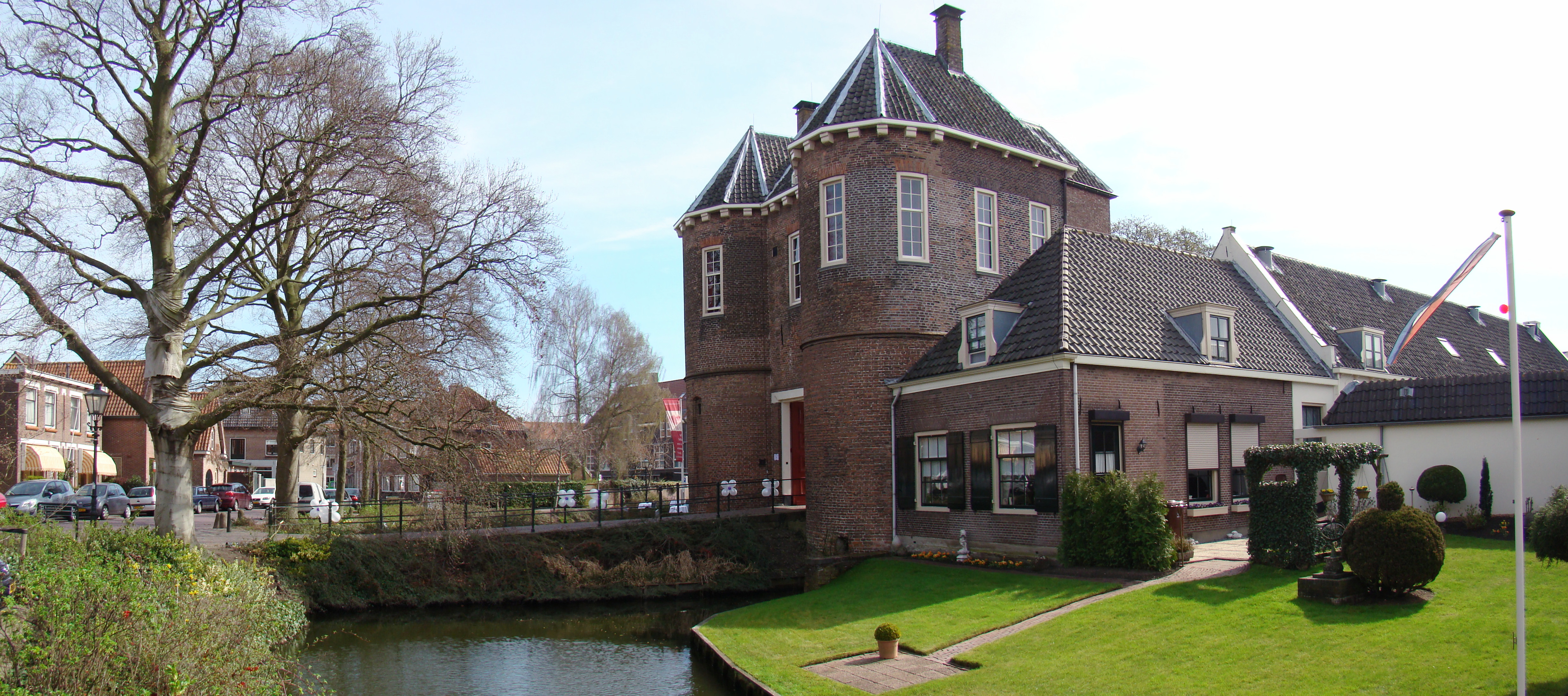
Kasteel Montfoort

== See also ==
- Memorial tablet for the lords of Montfoort
