= Mastwijk =

- Village
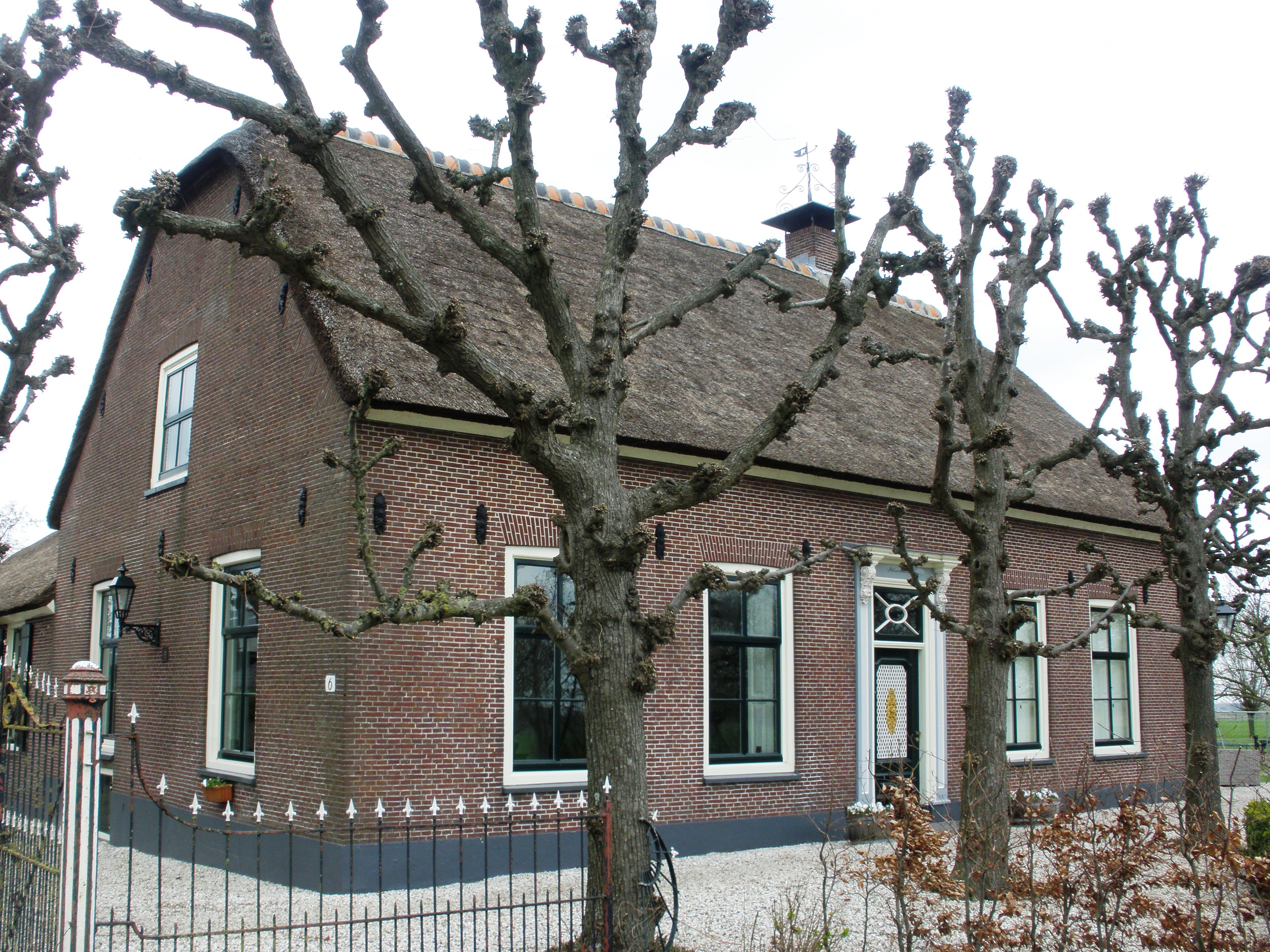
- Farm Schurenburg

- Location in the Netherlands Mastwijk (Netherlands)
- Coordinates: 52.05498°N 4.95935°E
- Country: Netherlands
- Province: Utrecht
- Municipality: Montfoort

Area
  - Total: 5.89 km^{2} (2.27 sq mi)

Population (2021)
  - Total: 460
  - Density: 78/km^{2} (200/sq mi)
- Time zone: UTC+1 (CET)
  - Summer (DST): UTC+2 (CEST)
- Postal code: 3417
- Dialing code: 0348

Mastwijk is a village in the Dutch province of Utrecht. It is a part of the municipality of Montfoort, and lies about 6 km southeast of Woerden.

It was first mentioned in 1217 as Mastwyck. Wijk means settlement, but mast either means pole or fodder. Mastwijk used to have its own place name sign, however nowadays it reads Montfoort. The polder around Mastwijk is situated dates around 1200. Schurenburg was a fortified house which was first mentioned 1341. It was demolished in the 18th century. The farm on the estate still bears the name. In 1840, Mastwijk was home to 44 people.
