= Willeskop =

- Hamlet
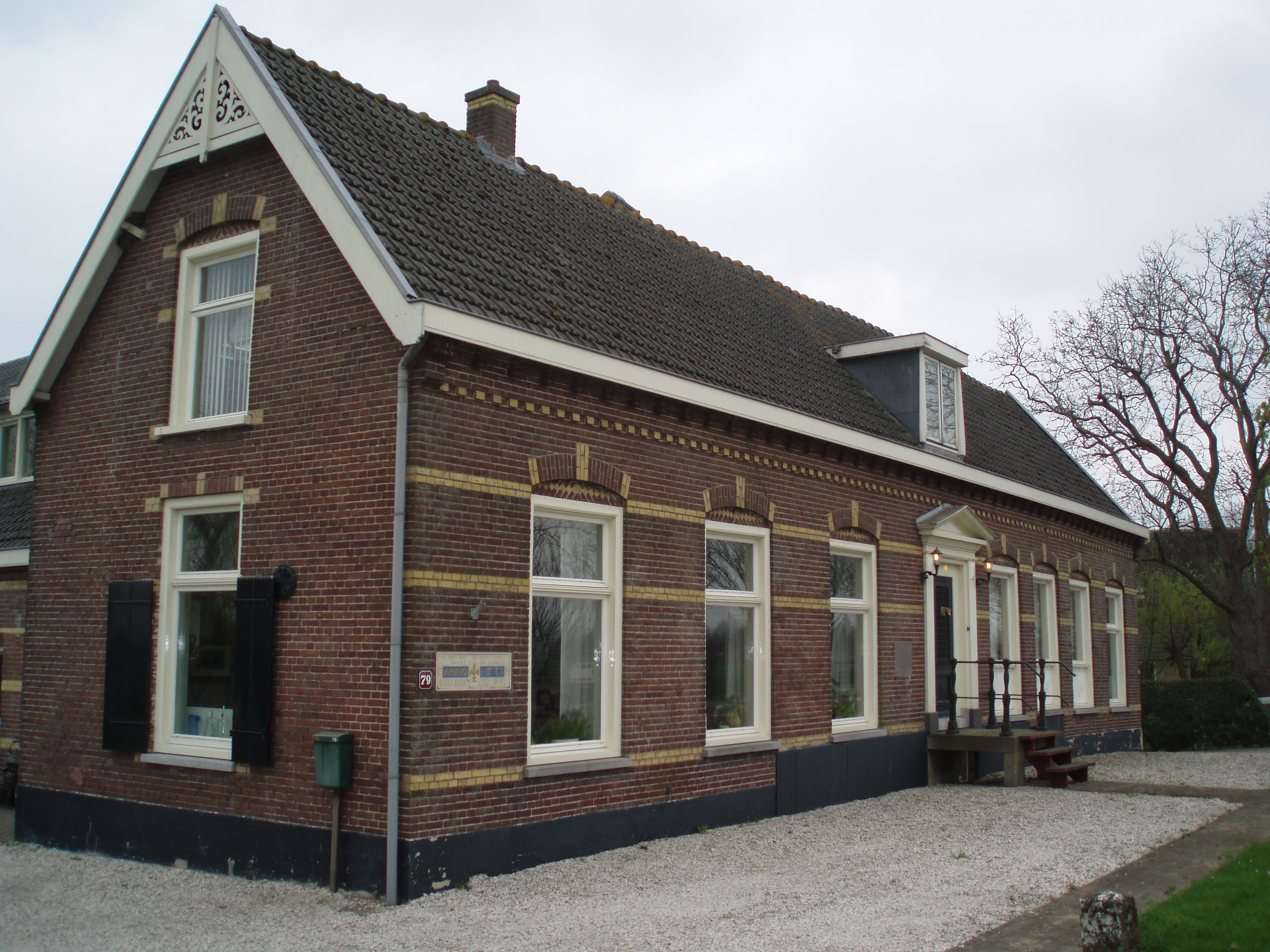
- Farm "Welgelegen" in Willeskop

- Location in the Netherlands Willeskop (Netherlands)
- Coordinates: 52°01′N 4°54′E
- Country: Netherlands
- Province: Utrecht
- Municipality: Montfoort

Area
  - Total: 1.83 km^{2} (0.71 sq mi)

Population (2021)
  - Total: 315
  - Density: 172/km^{2} (446/sq mi)
- Time zone: UTC+1 (CET)
  - Summer (DST): UTC+2 (CEST)
- Postal code: 3417
- Dialing code: 0348

Willeskop is a hamlet in the Dutch province of Utrecht. It is located in the municipality of Montfoort, 2 km east of that city.

Willeskop was a separate municipality between 1818 and 1989, when it was merged with Montfoort. A small part went to Oudewater.

It was first mentioned in 1282 as Wilhelmescoop, and means "(peat) concession of Wilhelm". The postal authorities have placed it under Linschoten. It does not have place name signs. In 1840, it was home to 313 people.

== Gallery ==
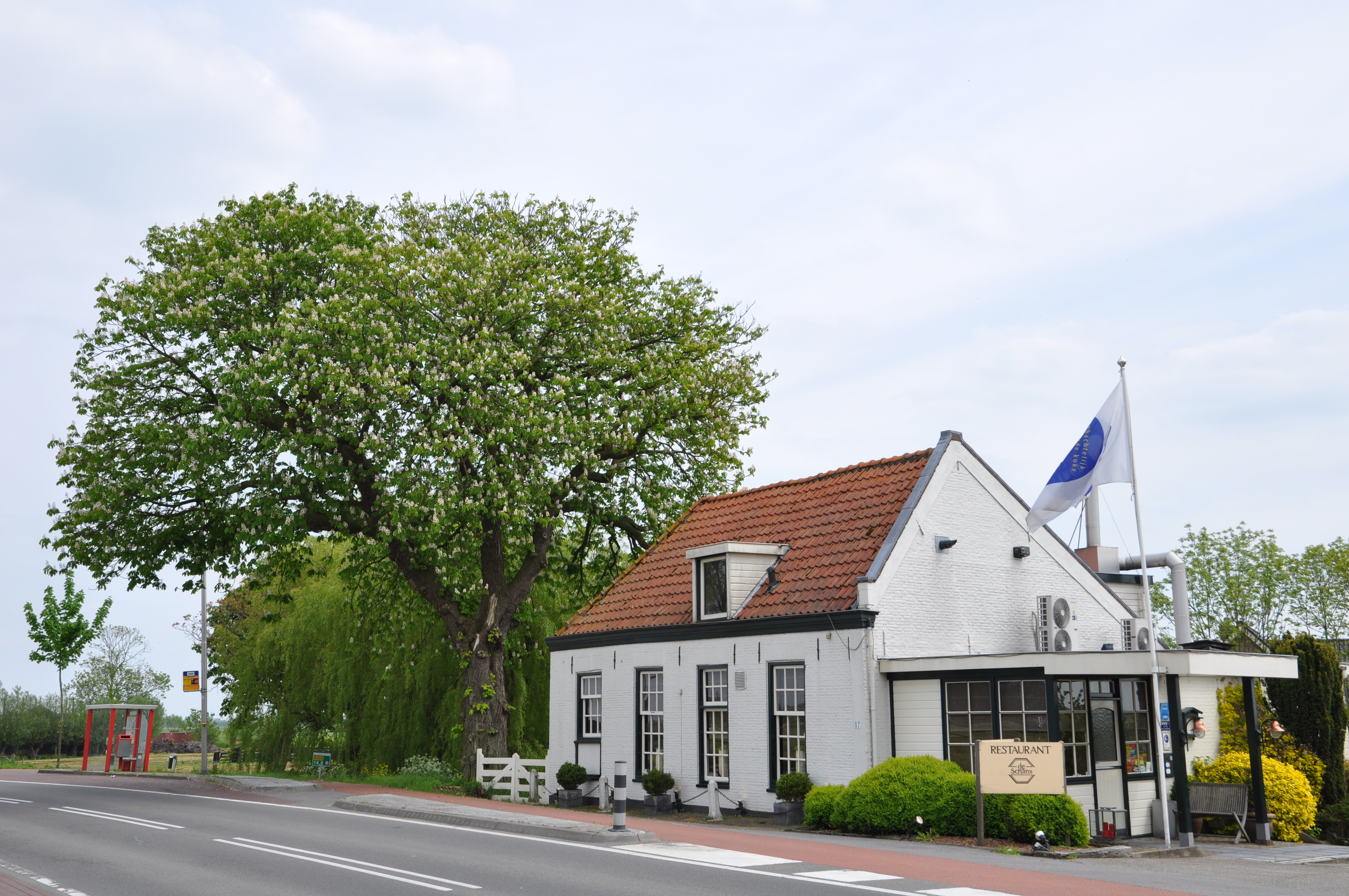
Restaurant

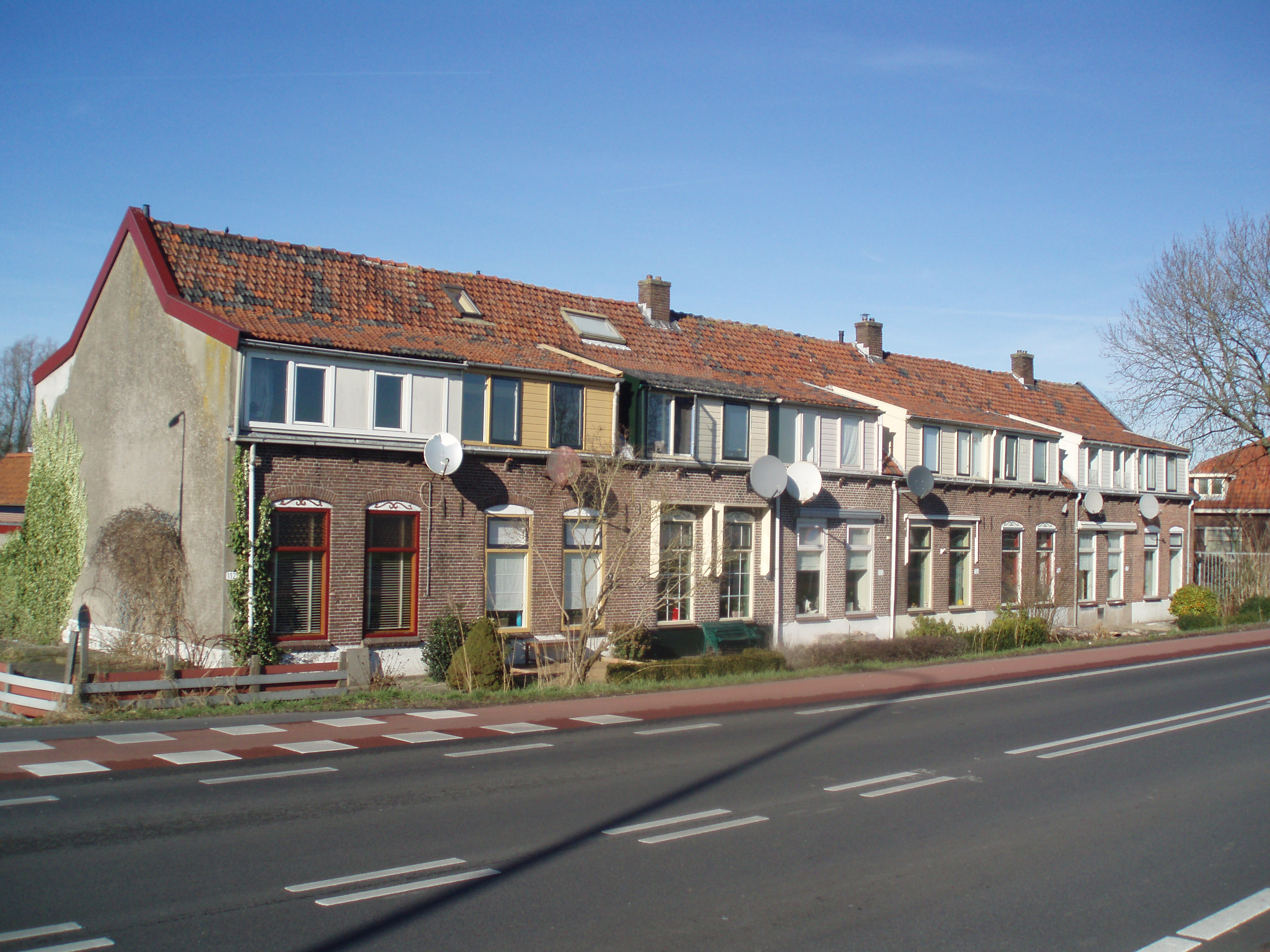
Workman's houses

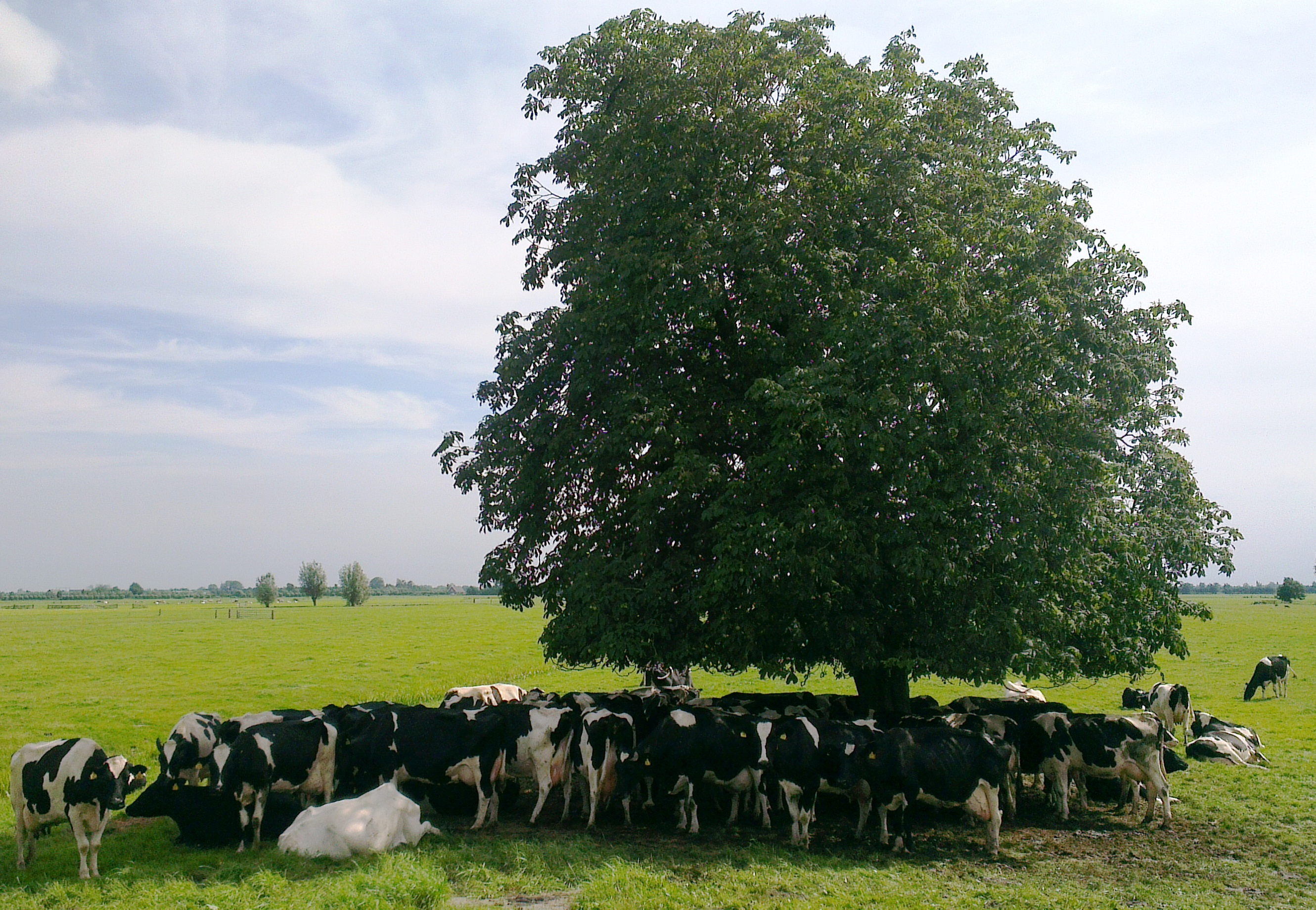
Cows under a tree

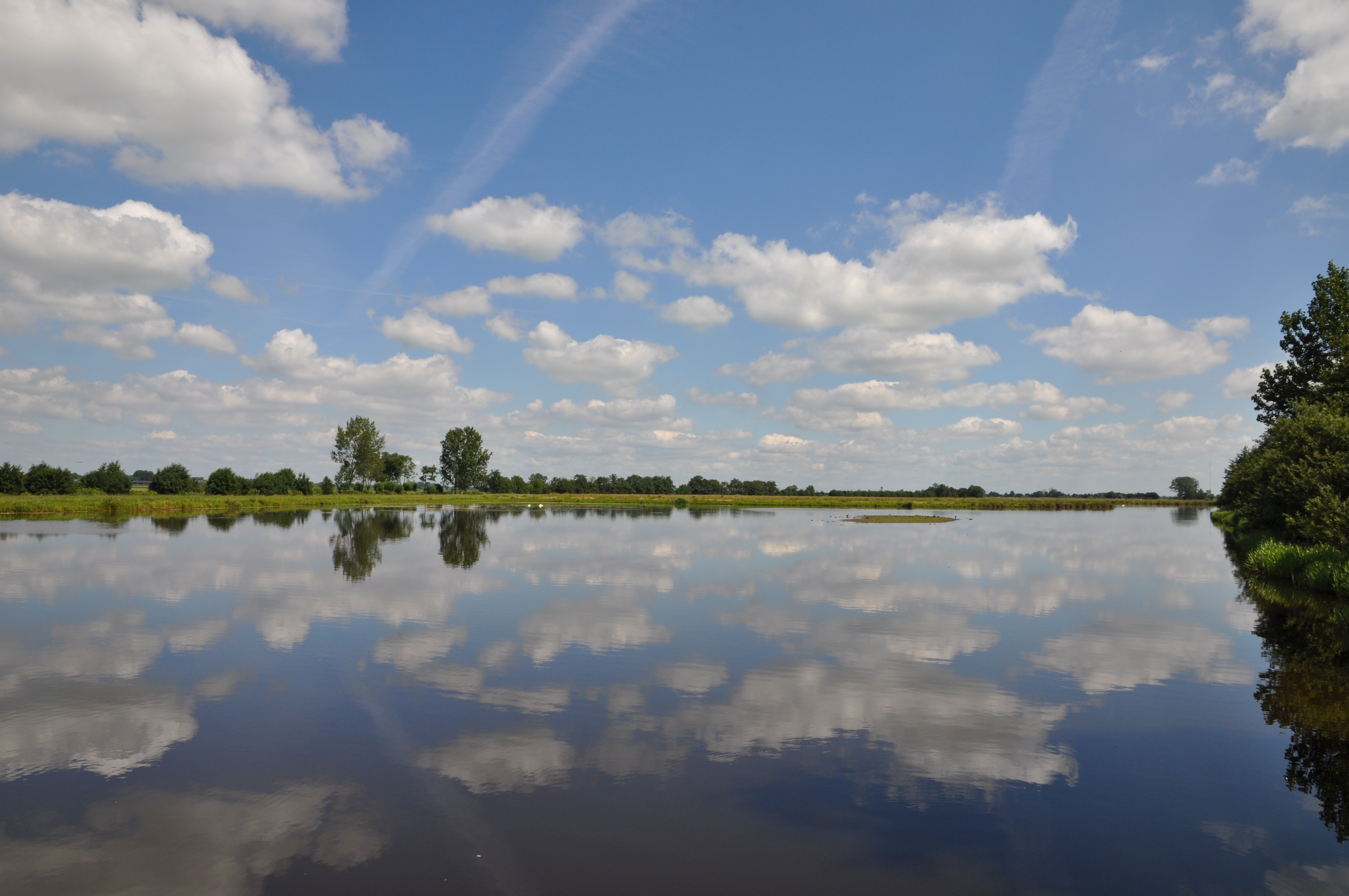
Nature area
