= Achthoven, Montfoort =

Achthoven
- Hamlet
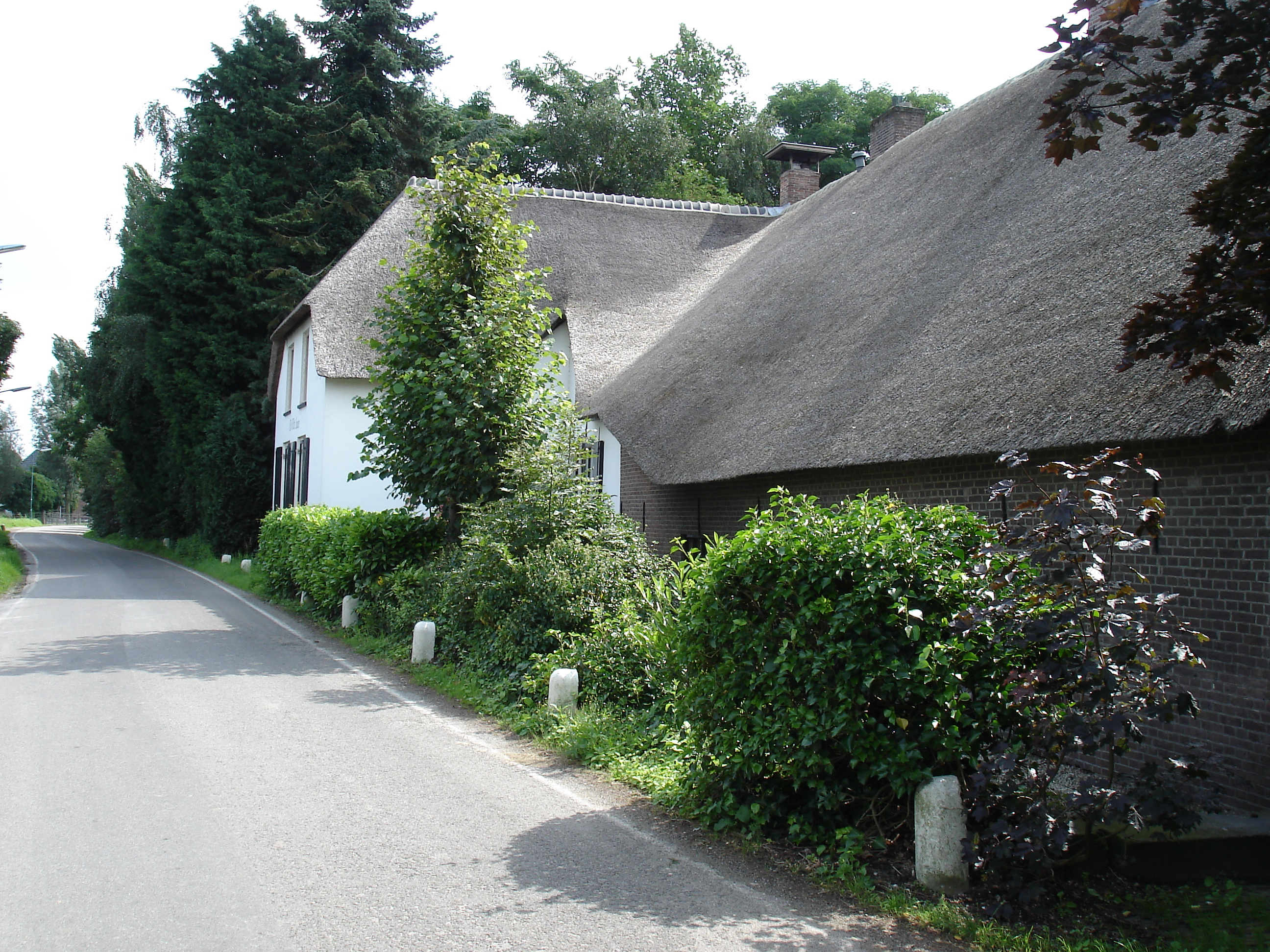
- House De Witte Swaen in Achthoven

- Location in the Netherlands Achthoven (Netherlands)
- Coordinates: 52°3′33″N 4°59′39″E
- Country: Netherlands
- Province: Utrecht
- Municipality: Montfoort
- Time zone: UTC+1 (CET)
  - Summer (DST): UTC+2 (CEST)
- Postal code: 3417
- Dialing code: 0348

Achthoven is a hamlet in the Dutch province of Utrecht. It is a part of the municipality of Montfoort, and lies about 6 km northwest of IJsselstein. Between 1818 and 1857, Achthoven was a separate municipality; it merged with Linschoten in 1857.

Achthoven is sometimes divided into two hamlets: Achthoven-West and Achthoven-Oost.

It was first mentioned in 1306 as "van dien achtehoeven", and means "eight parcels of land". Achthoven is not a statistical entity, and the postal authorities have placed it under Montfoort. It has place name sign, however they read Montfoort. In 1840, it was home to 105 people. Nowadays, it consists of about 60 houses.

== Gallery ==
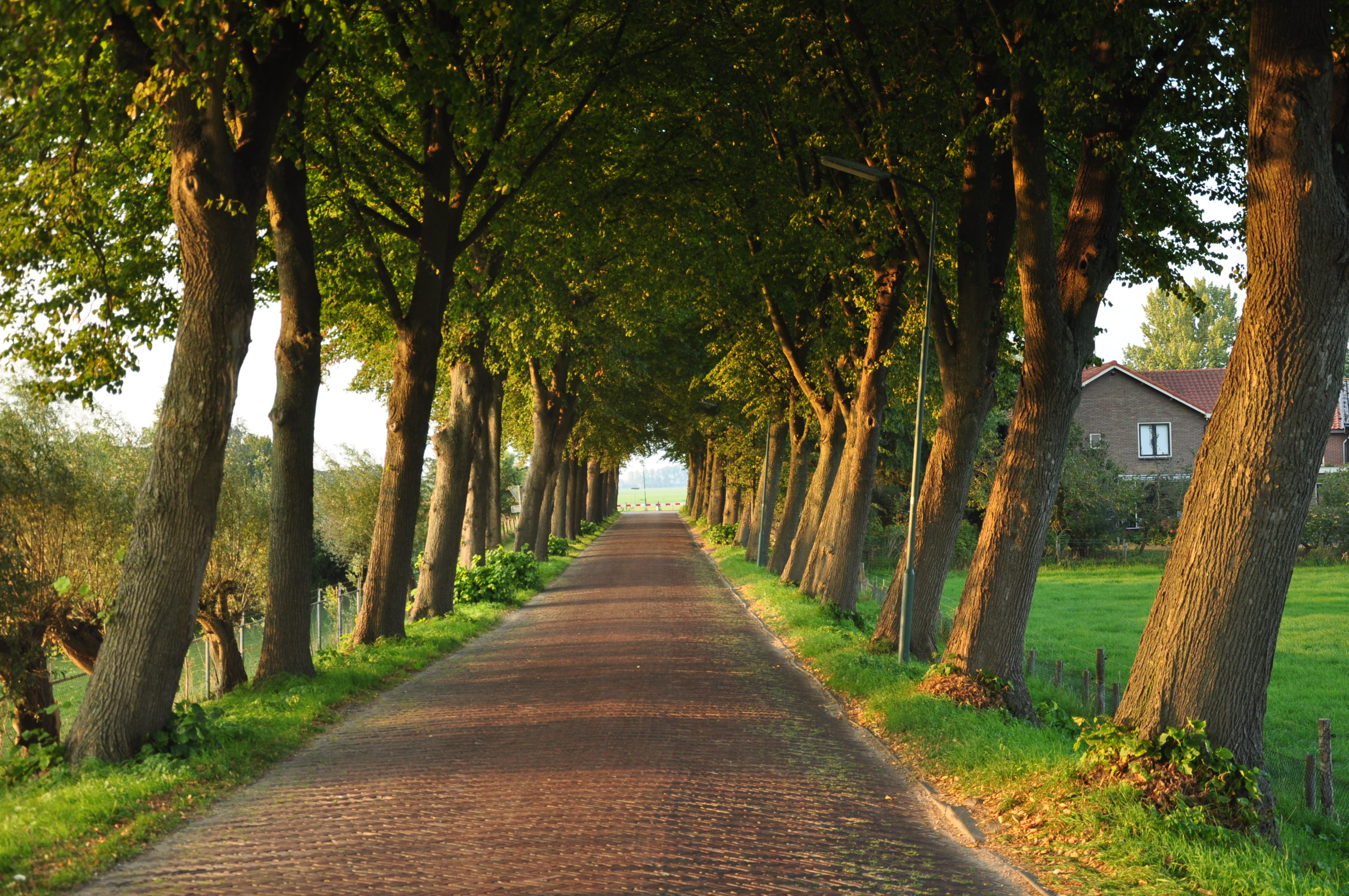
The Slotlaan in Achthoven

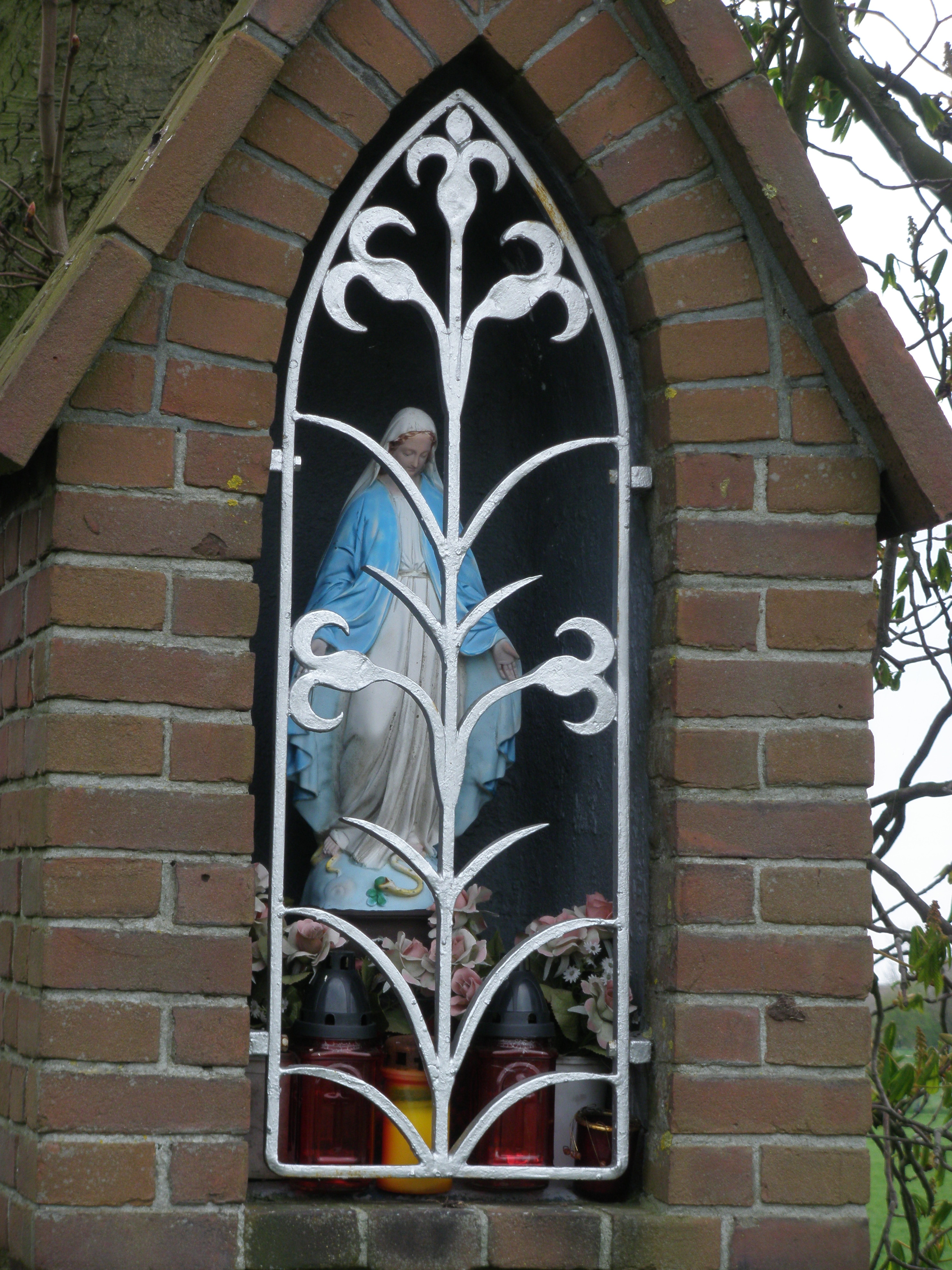
Mary chapel
