= Heeswijk, Utrecht =

Heeswijk
- Village
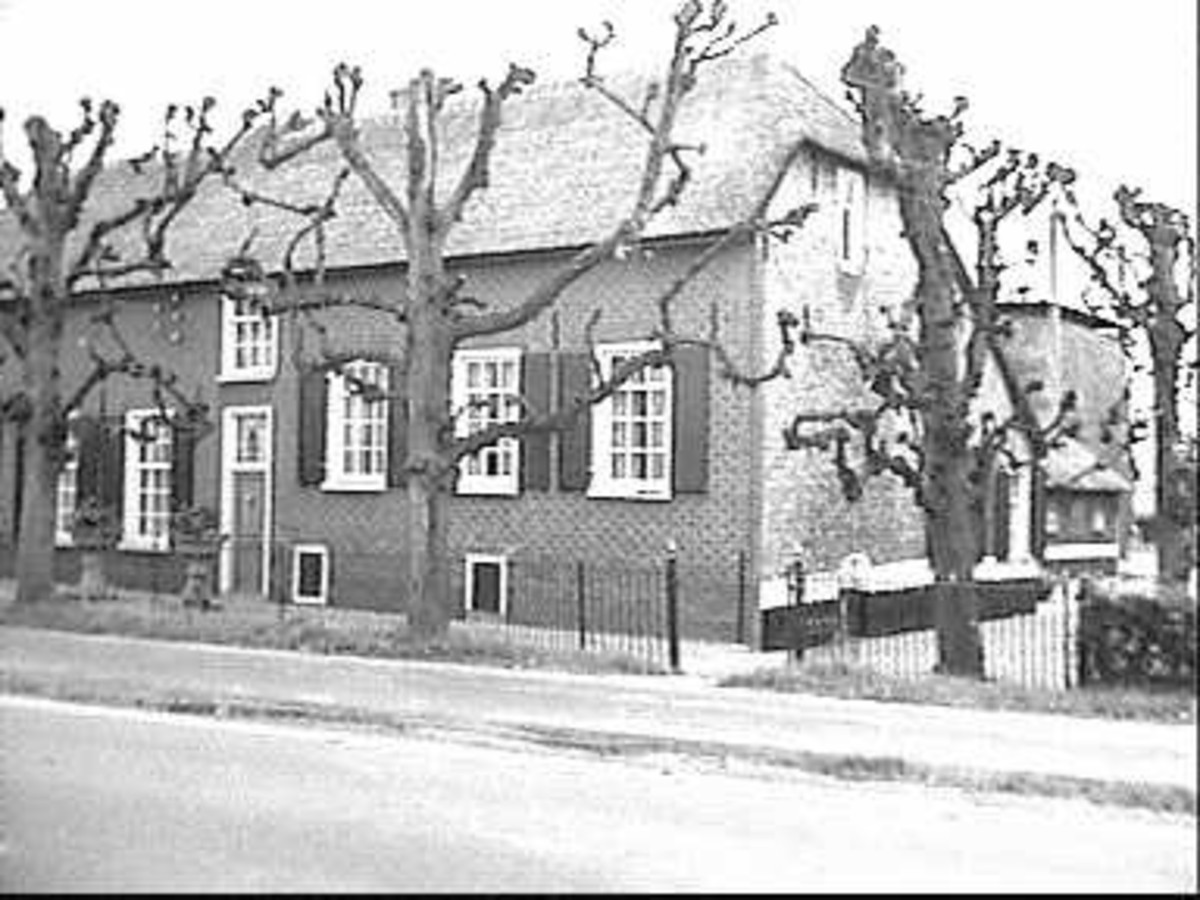
- Farm in Heeswijk

- Location in the Netherlands
- Coordinates: 52°03′06″N 4°58′04″E
- Country: Netherlands
- Province: Utrecht
- Municipality: Montfoort

Area
  - Total: 3.45 km^{2} (1.33 sq mi)
- Elevation: 1 m (3.3 ft)

Population (2021)
  - Total: 690
  - Density: 200/km^{2} (520/sq mi)
- Time zone: UTC+1 (CET)
  - Summer (DST): UTC+2 (CEST)
- Postal code: 3417
- Dialing code: 0348

Heeswijk is a village in the central Netherlands. It is located in Montfoort, Utrecht, about 6 km northwest of IJsselstein.

The village is first mentioned in 1204 as Hesewic, and means "settlement near shrubbery". The postal authorities have placed it under Montfoort, and it has no place name signs. It used to have a parish church, but the church was moved to neighbouring Montfoort. In 1840, Heeswijk was home to 59 people.
