= Van Heeswijk =

van Heeswijk is a Dutch surname. Notable people with the surname include:

- Jeanne van Heeswijk (born 1965), Dutch visual artist and curator
- Max van Heeswijk (born 1973), Dutch cyclist
