= Memorial Tablet for the Lords of Montfoort =

Oldest painting known to be made in the Netherlands

- Gedachtenistafel van de Heren van Montfoort (Dutch)
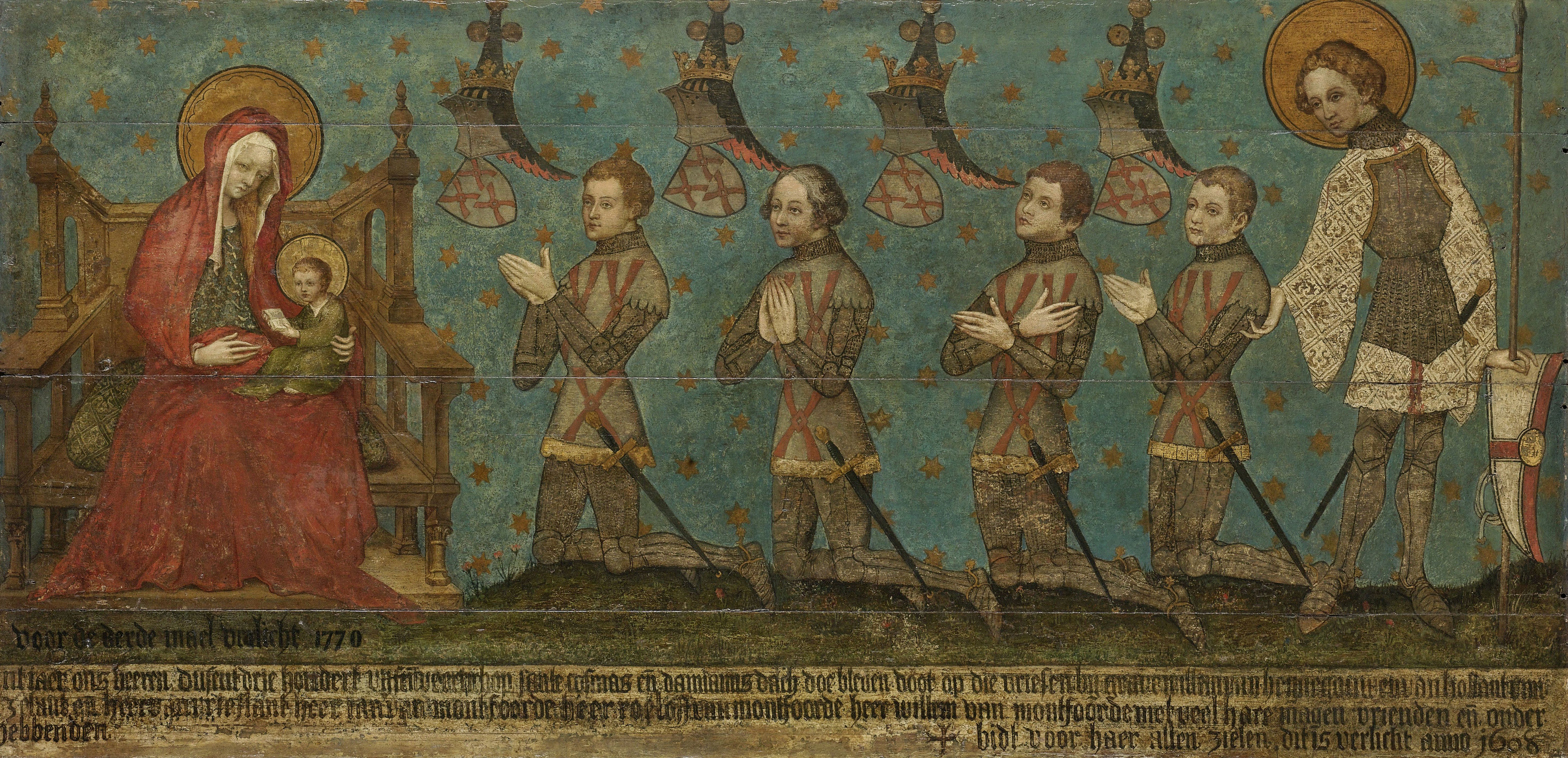
- Artist: unknown
- Year: c. 1380
- Type: Oil on panel
- Dimensions: 69 cm × 142 cm (27 in × 56 in)
- Location: Rijksmuseum Amsterdam, Amsterdam

The Memorial Tablet for the Lords of Montfoort is the oldest known surviving painting that was made in the Netherlands. It was created by an unknown artist.

== Depiction ==
The lords of Montfoort are shown between Mary and Saint George. From left to right these are: Jan I van Montfoort, his uncle Roelof de Rover van Rode, his uncle Willem de Rover, and presumably Hendrik de Rover Willemsz. They were all descendants from the noble Van Rode family. The first three died along with William IV, Count of Holland at the Battle of Warns. The latter is held by Saint George. This signifies the fact that he was the only one of the four persons on the painting to have survived the battle.

The painting was restored in 1608 and 1770. The four personal arms symbols were added later.

== Location ==
The painting was originally on the Mary-altar in the St. John's church in Linschoten. Later it became part of a private collection, also in Linschoten. On 9 August 1884, the painting was donated to the Rijksmuseum Amsterdam, where it is still located.

== Sources ==
- De Heren van Montfoort (Rijksmuseum Amsterdam)
- RKD images: Kunstwerknummer 29041
