= Achthoven, Vijfheerenlanden =

Achthoven
- Hamlet
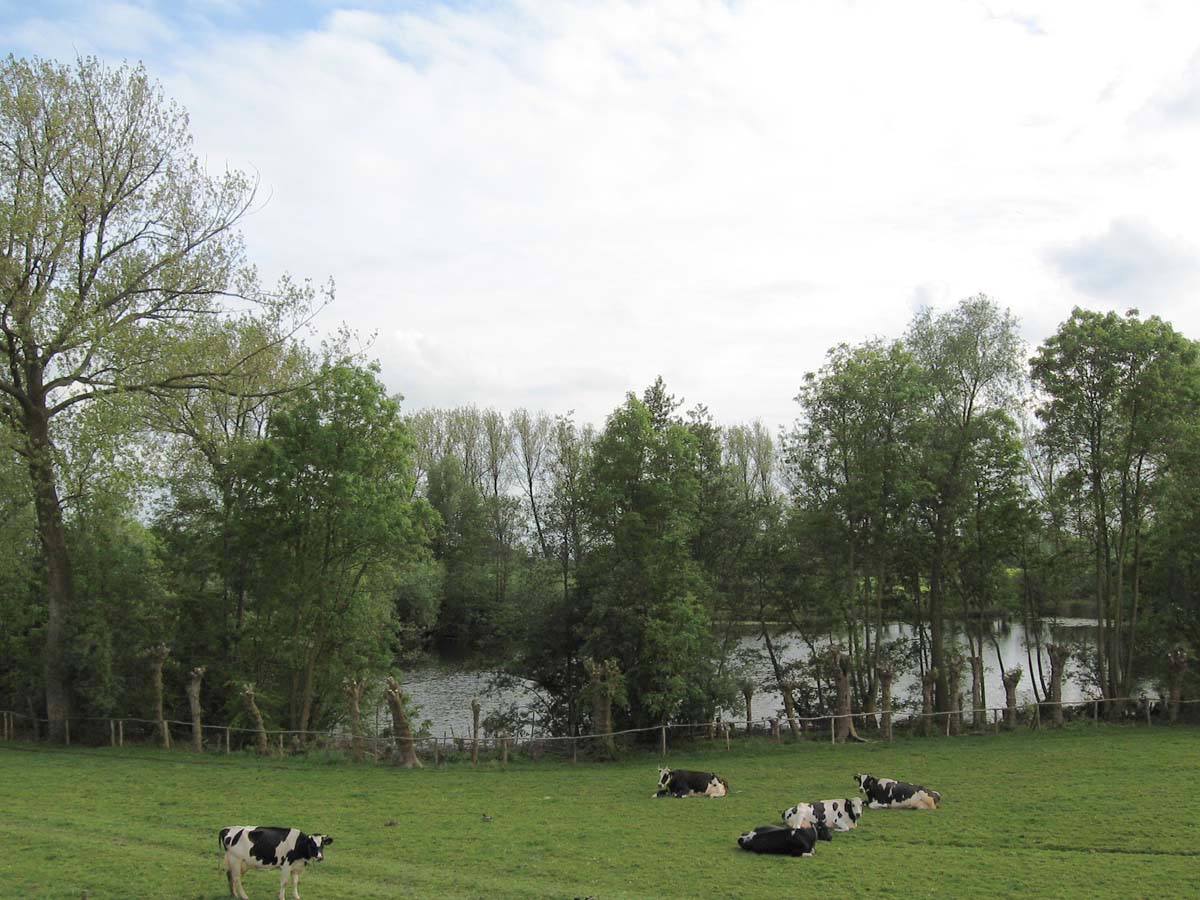
- Decoy pool De Kuilen near Achthoven

- Location in the Netherlands Achthoven (Netherlands)
- Coordinates: 51°58′0″N 4°59′21″E
- Country: Netherlands
- Province: Utrecht
- Municipality: Vijfheerenlanden

Area
  - Total: 7.11 km^{2} (2.75 sq mi)

Population (2021)
  - Total: 230
  - Density: 32/km^{2} (84/sq mi)
- Time zone: UTC+1 (CET)
  - Summer (DST): UTC+2 (CEST)
- Postal code: 4128
- Dialing code: 0347 and 0183

Achthoven is a hamlet in the Dutch province of Utrecht. It is a part of the municipality of Vijfheerenlanden, and lies about 7 km south of IJsselstein.

The hamlet is located in the Polder Achthoven, on the dike of the river Lek. Achthoven used to be a separate "heerlijkheid" (manor). Until 2019 it was a part of the province of South Holland.

The hamlet was first mentioned in the middle of the 14th century as Cortachoven, and means "eight parcels of land". Achthoven has no place name signs, and the postal authorities have placed it under Lexmond. In 1840, it was home to 200 people. Polder Achterhoven is a 118 hectares (290 acres) nature area in the floodplains of the Lek River.
