= Linschoten (village) =

- Village
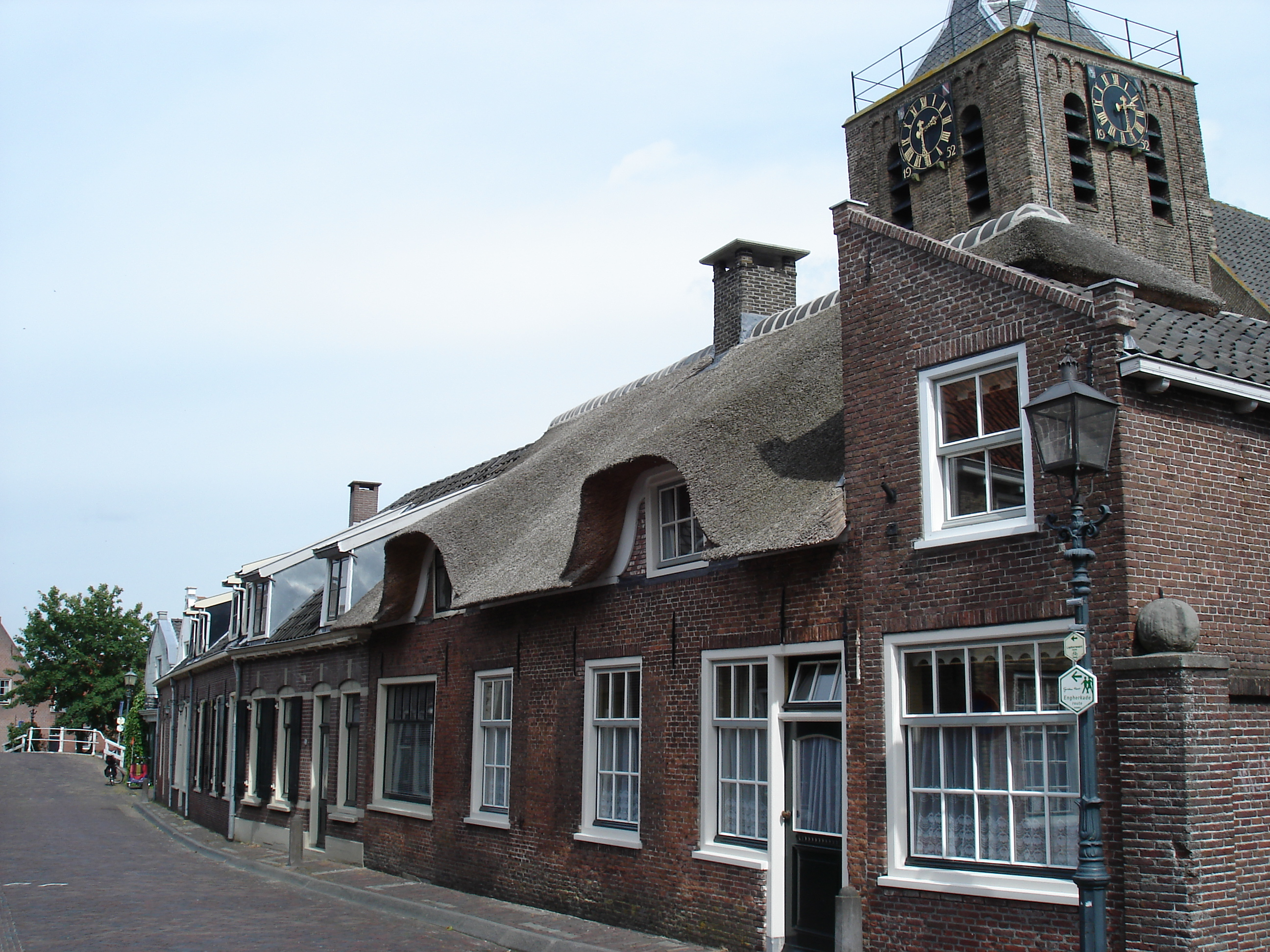

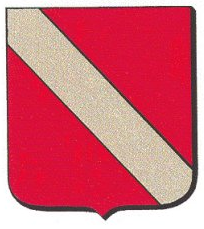
- Flag Coat of arms

- Location in the Netherlands Linschoten (Netherlands)
- Coordinates: 52°3′46″N 4°54′52″E
- Country: Netherlands
- Province: Utrecht
- Municipality: Montfoort

Area
  - Total: 1.24 km^{2} (0.48 sq mi)
- Elevation: 0.1 m (0.33 ft)

Population (2021)
  - Total: 3,640
  - Density: 2,940/km^{2} (7,600/sq mi)
- Time zone: UTC+1 (CET)
  - Summer (DST): UTC+2 (CEST)
- Postal code: 3461
- Dialing code: 0348

Linschoten (Dutch pronunciation: [ˈlɪnsxoːtə(n)]) is a village in the Dutch province of Utrecht. It is a part of the municipality of Montfoort, and lies about 3 km southeast of Woerden.

== History ==
The village was first mentioned in 1172 as Gerardus de Lindescote, and means (higher) corner near Linde which is either a tree (Tilia) or the name of a river. Linschoten developed along the eponymous river. During the 12th century, it was a peat excavation settlement. In 1270, a castle was built, but was reduced to a ruin by 1438. The Dutch Reformed Church dates from 1270, but was destroyed in 1482 by the citizens of Oudewater. In 1627, the church was extensively renovated. In 1617, the Montfoortse Vaart was dug and met the Linschoten River at the village of Linschoten.

In 1637, the manor house Huis te Linschoten was built in a castle like style. In 1771, it was redesigned and extended in Versailles style. In 1834, a large park was added around the estate. In 1840, Linschoten was home to 552 people.

== Notable people born in Linschoten ==
- Mat Herben, (born 1952), politician
- Rigard van Klooster, (born 1989) – track cyclist and former speed skater

== Gallery ==
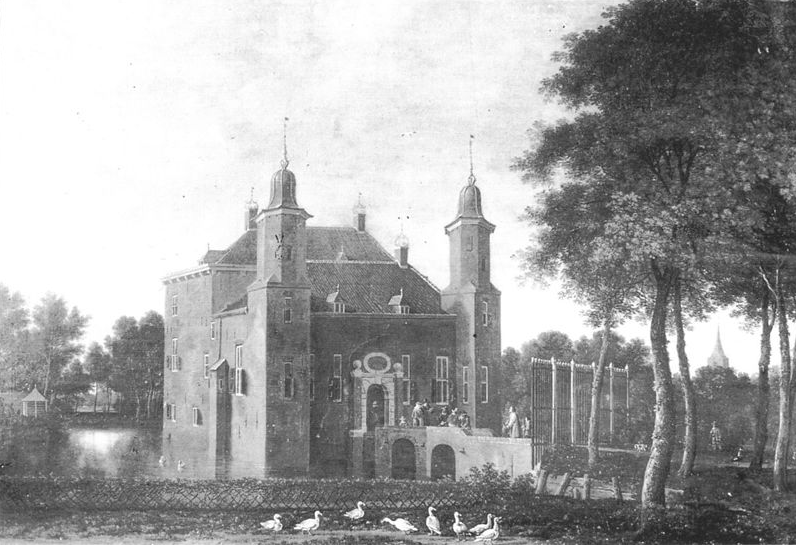
Castle Linschoten

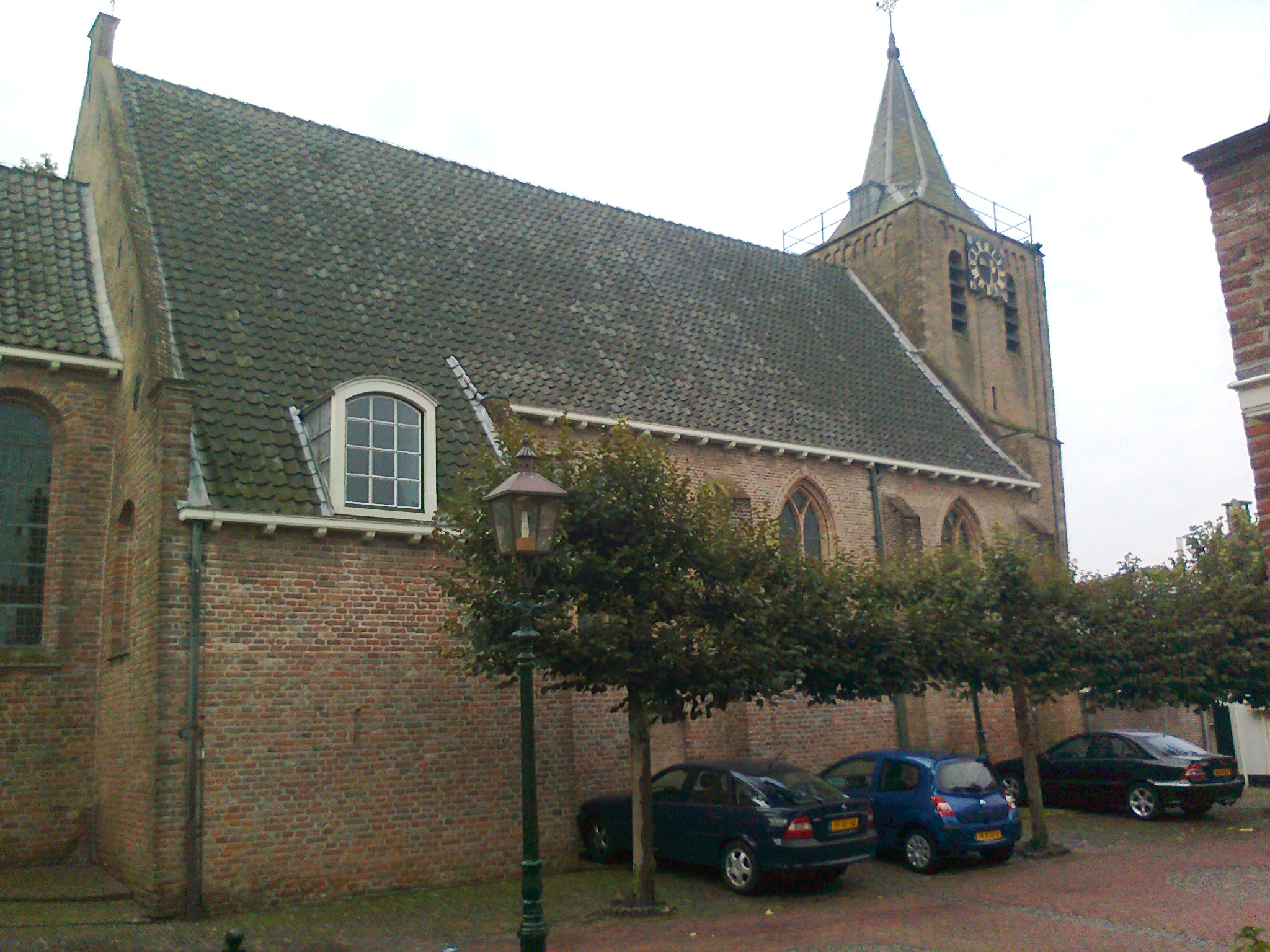
St Jans Church

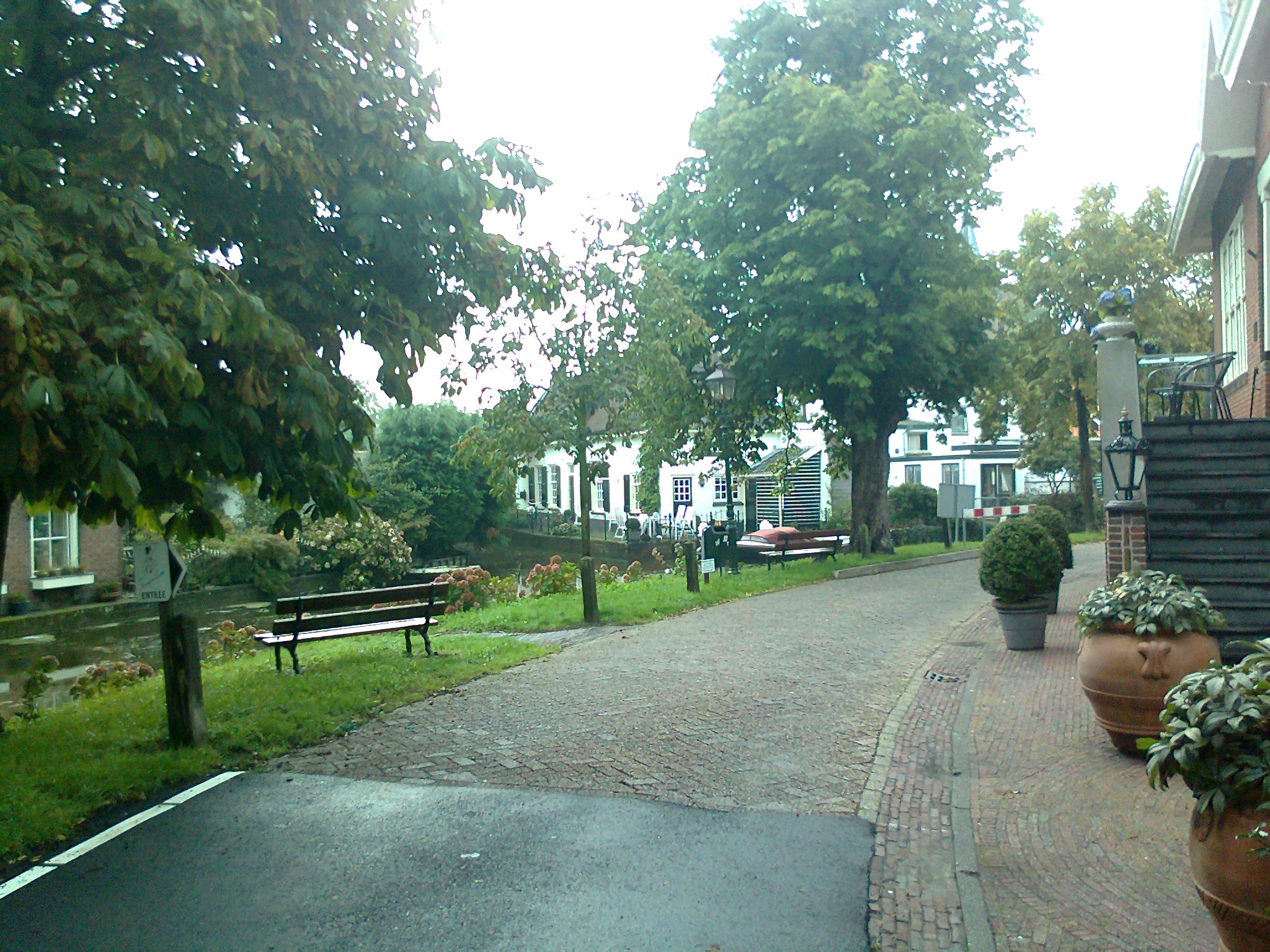
Street view

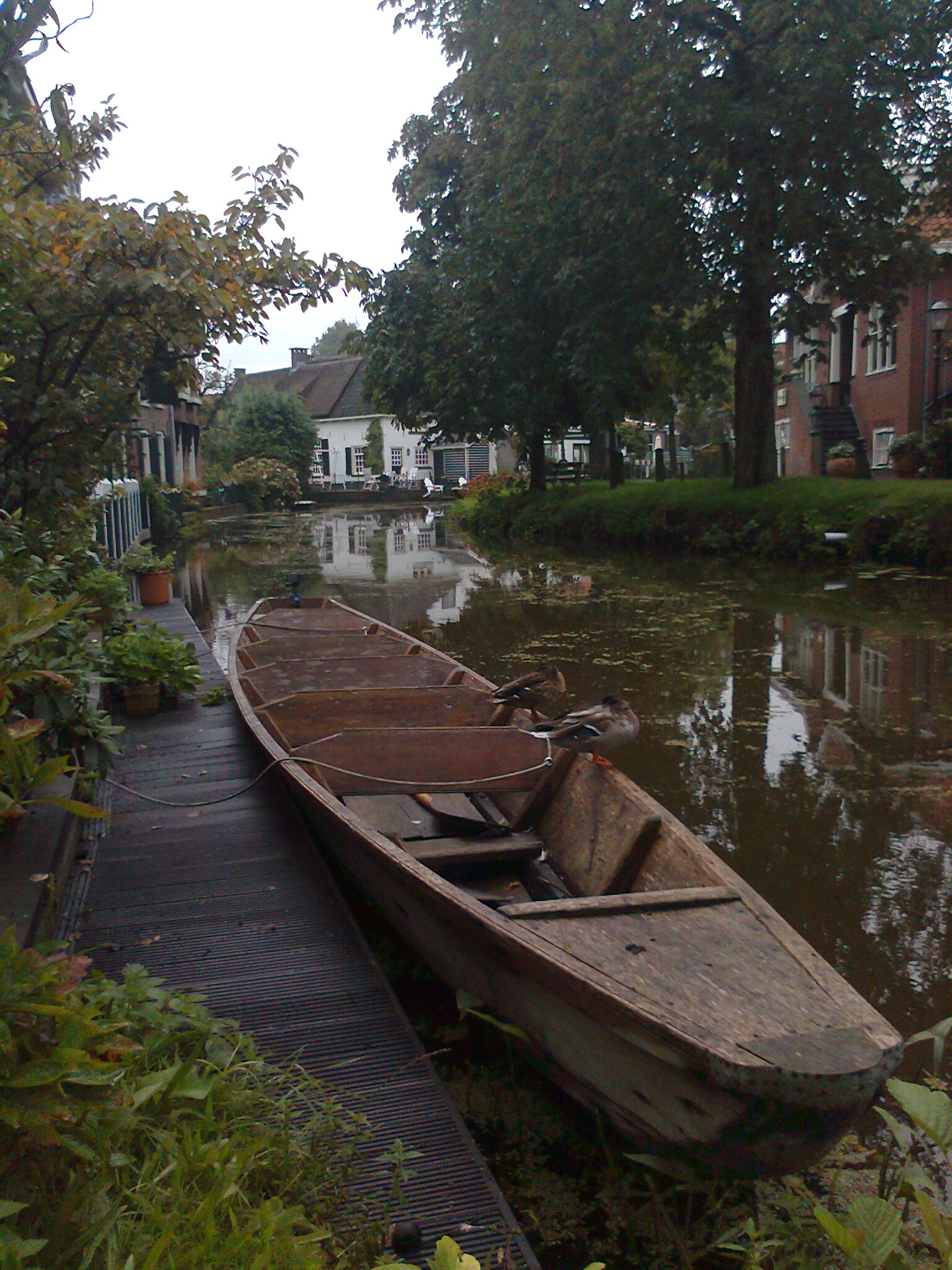
Boat on the canal

== See also ==
- Memorial tablet for the lords of Montfoort
