= Operation Market Garden =

1944 World War II military operation

- Part of the Allied advance from Paris to the Rhine on the Western Front during the Second World War
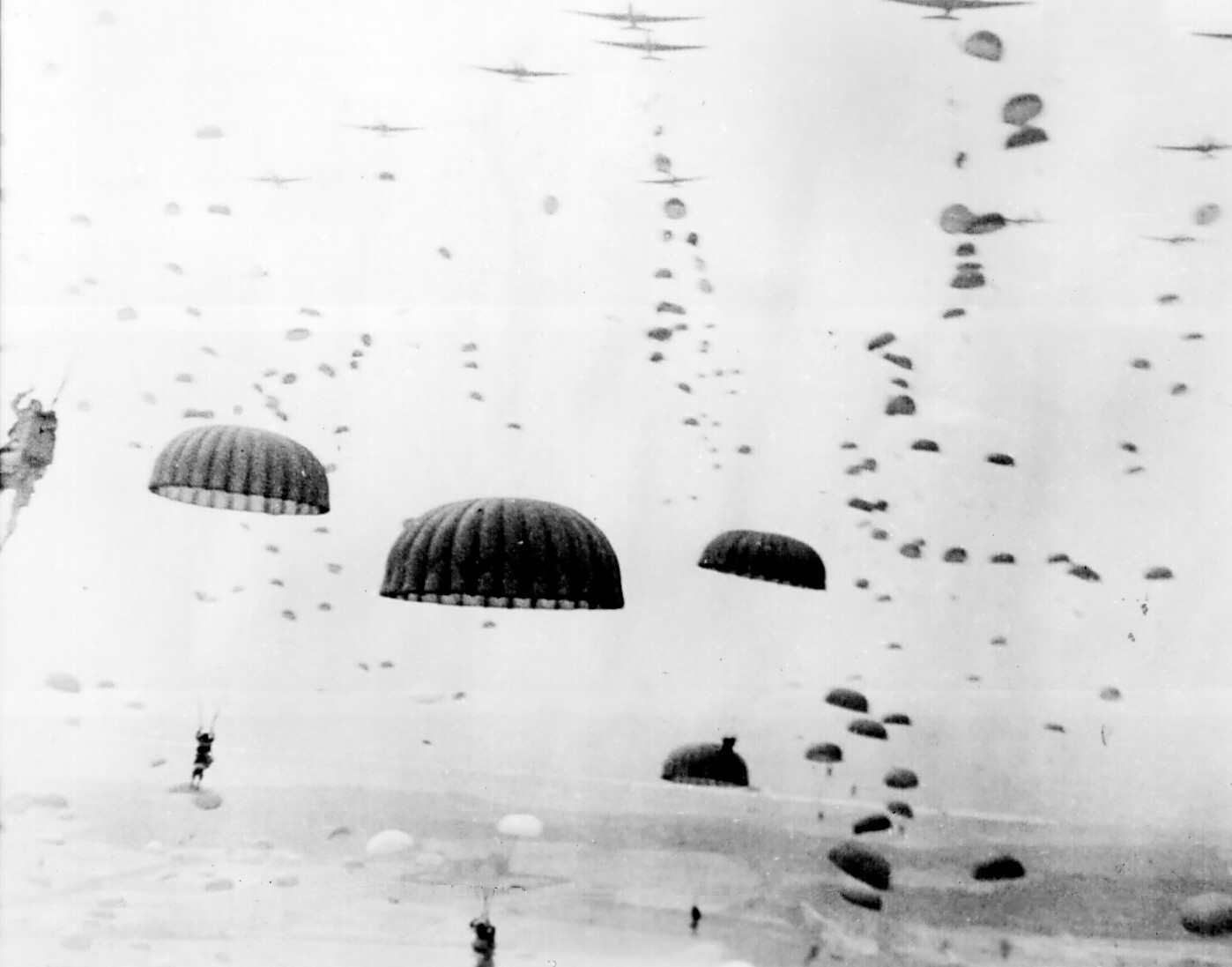
- Paratroopers of the First Allied Airborne Army descending over the Netherlands
Date	17–25 September 1944
Location	Eindhoven‑Nijmegen‑Arnhem corridor, Netherlands
Result	See debate on outcome
Territorial changes	Allies fail to capture bridge across the Nederrijn (Lower Rhine River) at Arnhem; Allies capture Dutch cities of Eindhoven and Nijmegen and many towns from Germans. Allies advance 60 miles (97 km) into German-held Netherlands.

Belligerents
United Kingdom; United States; Canada; Poland; Netherlands (Note: The Dutch forces most involved in Market Garden were the Royal Netherlands Motorized Infantry Brigade (attached to British XXX Corps) and the Dutch resistance.); Belgium (Note: The Belgian forces involved in Market Garden were the Independent Belgian Brigade (attached to British XXX Corps))	Germany

Commanders and leaders
Dwight D. Eisenhower; Bernard Montgomery; Airborne forces ("Market"); Lewis H. Brereton; Frederick Browning; Roy Urquhart; Stanisław Sosabowski; Maxwell D. Taylor; James M. Gavin; Armoured forces ("Garden"); Miles Dempsey; Brian Horrocks	Gerd von Rundstedt; Walter Model; Kurt Student; Wilhelm Bittrich; Heinz Harmel; Walter Harzer; Hans-Wolfgang Reinhard; Gustav-Adolf von Zangen

Units involved
1st Airborne Division; 1st Ind. Parachute Brigade; 101st Airborne Division; 82nd Airborne Division XXX Corps	1st Parachute Army: II SS Panzer Corps; 9th SS Panzer Division "Hohenstaufen" 10th SS Panzer Division "Frundsberg"

Strength
Airborne: three divisions & one independent brigade 34,876 troops landed 3,600 combined allied aircraft (including 1,534–1,550 C-47s and 500 gliders); Armoured: two brigades Motorised infantry: eight brigades 50,000 troops 800 tanks	100,000 troops (Note: While the size of the German force used to oppose Market Garden is currently unknown, Michael Reynolds notes that Fifteenth Army, based to the west of the axis of advance, contained over 80,000 men. The strength of First Parachute Army is not given. However, Reynolds notes it had just been reinforced with over 30,000 men from the Luftwaffe, including paratroopers in various stages of training. Finally, the 9th and 10th SS Panzer Divisions each contained in the neighborhood of 6,000–7,000 men.); 366 tanks and assault guns; 1,344 artillery pieces; 340–440 aircraft

Casualties and losses
15,326–17,200 killed, wounded, and captured 88 tanks destroyed (Note: XXX Corps lost 70 tanks while VIII and XII Corps lost c. 18 tanks.); 377 aircraft and gliders lost	6,315–13,300 killed and wounded Unknown total captured

Operation Market Garden was an Allied military operation during the Second World War, fought in the German-occupied Netherlands from 17 to 25 September 1944. Its objective was to create a salient spanning 62 miles (100 km) into German territory with a bridgehead over the Nederrijn (Lower Rhine River), creating an Allied invasion route into northern Germany. This was to be achieved by two sub-operations: seizing nine bridges with combined American, British and Polish airborne forces ("Market") followed by British land forces swiftly following over the bridges ("Garden").

The airborne operation was undertaken by the First Allied Airborne Army with the land operation by the British Second Army, with XXX Corps moving up the centre supported by VIII and XII Corps on their flanks. The airborne soldiers, consisting of paratroops and glider-borne troops numbering around 35,000–40,000, were dropped at sites where they could capture key bridges and hold the terrain until the land forces arrived. The land forces consisted of ten armoured and motorised brigades with approximately 800 tanks and 50,000 soldiers. The land forces advanced from the south along a single road partly surrounded by flood plain on both sides. The plan anticipated that they would cover the 62 miles (100 km) from their start at the Belgian–Dutch border to the Arnhem bridge across the Lower Rhine in 48 hours. About 100,000 German soldiers were in the vicinity to oppose the allied offensive. It was the largest airborne operation of the war up to that point. (Note: Operation Varsity in 1945 involved more aircraft, gliders, and troops on D-Day than in Market, but troops flown in on later days made Market Garden the larger operation.)

The operation succeeded in capturing the Dutch cities of Eindhoven and Nijmegen along with many towns, and a few V-2 rocket launching sites. It failed in its most important objective: securing the bridge over the Rhine at Arnhem. The British 1st Airborne Division was unable to secure the bridge and was withdrawn from the north side of the Rhine after suffering 8,000 dead, missing, and captured out of a complement of 10,000 men. When the retreat order came, there were not enough boats to get everyone back across the river. The Germans subsequently rounded up most of those left behind, but some of the British and Polish paratroopers managed to avoid capture by the Germans and were sheltered by the Dutch underground until they could be rescued in Operation Pegasus on 22 October 1944. Historians have been critical of the planning and execution of Operation Market Garden. Antony Beevor said that Market Garden "was a bad plan right from the start and right from the top".

The Germans counterattacked the Nijmegen salient but failed to retake any of the Allied gains. Arnhem was finally captured by the Allies in April 1945, towards the end of the war.

== Geography ==
Short US Army video of the overall plan for Operation Market Garden

Highway 69 (later nicknamed "Hell's Highway") leading through the planned route was two narrow lanes, partly raised above a surrounding flat terrain of polder or floodplain. The ground on either side of the highway was in places too soft to support tactical vehicle movement and there were numerous dikes and drainage ditches. Dikes tended to be topped by trees or large bushes, and roads and paths were lined with trees. In early autumn this meant that observation would be seriously restricted.

There were six major water obstacles between the XXX Corps' start point and the objective of the north bank of the Lower Rhine River: the Wilhelmina Canal at Son en Breugel 100 feet (30 m) wide; the Zuid-Willems Canal at Veghel 80 feet (20 m); the Maas River at Grave 800 feet (240 m); the Maas-Waal Canal 200 feet (60 m); the Waal River at Nijmegen 850 feet (260 m); and the Rhine at Arnhem 300 feet (90 m). The plan was for airborne forces to seize bridges across all these obstacles nearly simultaneously – any failure to do so would result in delay or defeat. In case bridges were demolished by the Germans, XXX Corps had plans to rebuild them. To this end, a vast quantity of bridging material was collected, along with 2,300 vehicles to carry it and 9,000 engineers to assemble it.

Although the area is generally flat with less than 30 feet (9 m) of variation in altitude, Lieutenant-General Brian Horrocks, commander of XXX Corps, recalled that "The country was wooded and rather marshy, which made any outflanking operation impossible." Two important hill areas, 300 feet (90 m) high, were some of the highest ground in the Netherlands: one northwest of Arnhem and one in the 82nd Airborne Division's zone, the Groesbeek ridge. Seizure and defence of this elevated terrain was considered vital to holding the highway bridges.

== Background ==
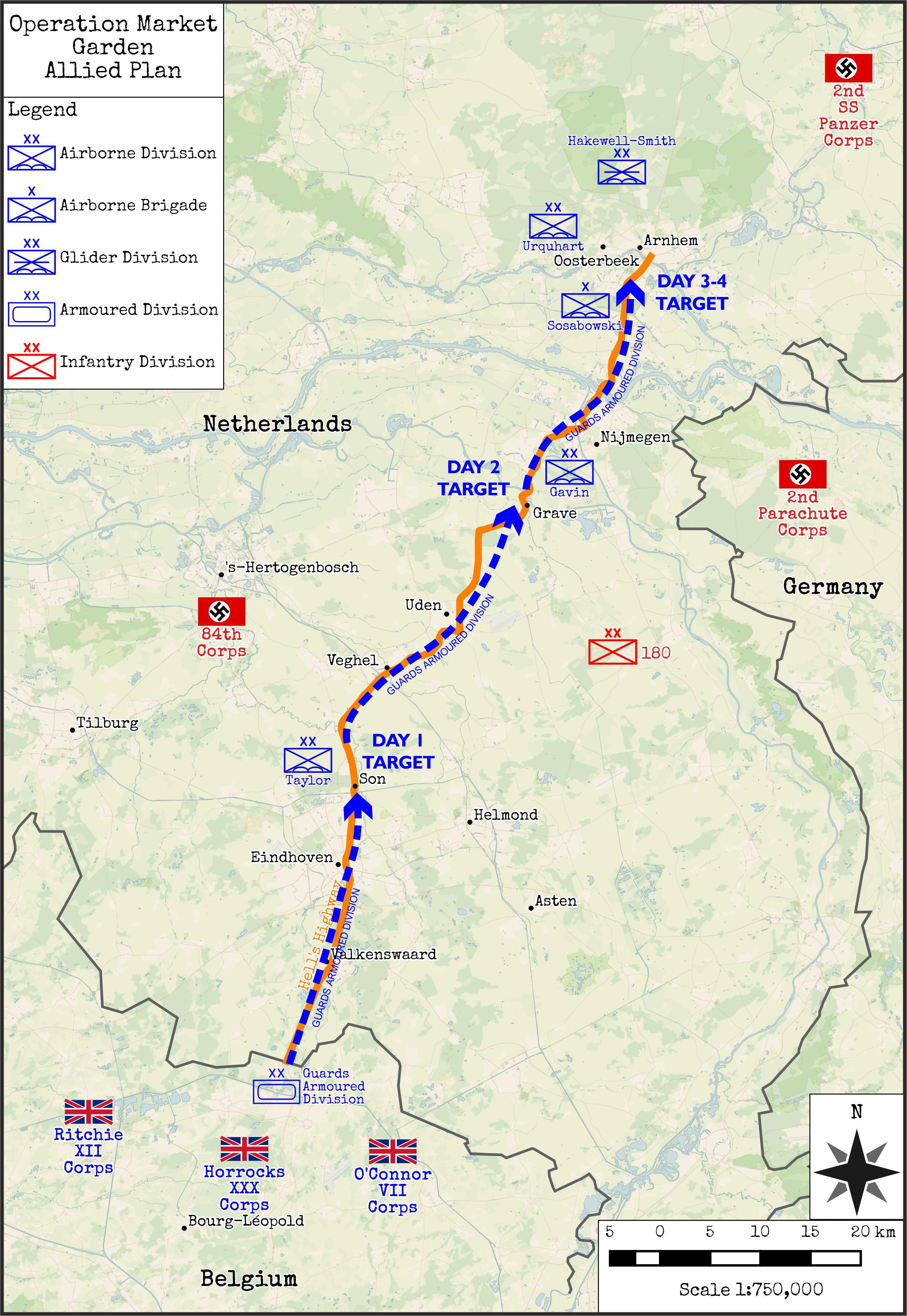
Operation Market Garden

In August 1944, following the Allied breakout from Normandy and the closure of the Falaise Pocket, the allied armies pursued the retreating German army, expelling it from nearly all of France and Belgium. On 1 September, the Supreme Allied Commander General Dwight D. Eisenhower took over command of ground forces, while continuing as Supreme Commander. Field Marshal Bernard Montgomery resented this change, although the US and UK had agreed to it before the Normandy invasion. He had been the commander of ground forces and the change resulted in his former subordinate, Omar Bradley, becoming his equal. Montgomery continued to command the 21st Army Group, consisting mainly of British and Canadian units.

=== Logistics ===
By late August the allied armies were running out of petroleum gasoline. Several allied divisions and corps were forced to halt their advance temporarily to replenish supplies. To Eisenhower fell the task of responding to competing demands for fuel and other supplies for the armies under his command. There was no shortage of fuel in the makeshift ports in Normandy; the difficulty lay in transporting sufficient quantities from Normandy to the armies in Belgium and northern France. Most arrived at the front in five gallon jerry cans after being transported hundreds of kilometres by trucks, known as the Red Ball Express, from makeshift ports in Normandy. A potential solution to the logistics problem was to capture a large port more accessible to the advancing allied armies. On 4 September, Montgomery's troops did just that, capturing the massive port of Antwerp in Belgium virtually intact. However, the Scheldt Estuary leading to it was still under German control preventing its use. Neither Eisenhower nor Montgomery initially made opening the port of Antwerp a top priority and Antwerp was not used by allied supply ships until 28 November after the Battle of the Scheldt. The allied failure to win access quickly to the port of Antwerp has been called "one of the greatest tactical mistakes of the war". Winston Churchill later acknowledged that "clearing the Scheldt Estuary and opening the port of Antwerp had been delayed for the sake of the Arnhem thrust. Thereafter it was given first priority."

=== Strategy ===
Eisenhower proposed a "broad front strategy" in which the allied armies of Montgomery in Belgium and Bradley further south in France advanced in parallel on a front several hundred miles wide into Germany. Montgomery – and Bradley's aggressive subordinate, George S. Patton – both desired a concentration of forces, a "single thrust" forward into Germany, but each man saw himself as the leader of a single thrust. Montgomery said the allied strategy should be "one powerful full-blooded thrust across the Rhine and into the heart of Germany backed by the whole of the resources of the Allied Armies". Such a policy would relegate Bradley's American armies to a "purely static role". On his part, Patton said that with 400,000 gallons of gasoline he could be in Germany in two days. War planners saw both men's proposals as tactically and logistically infeasible.

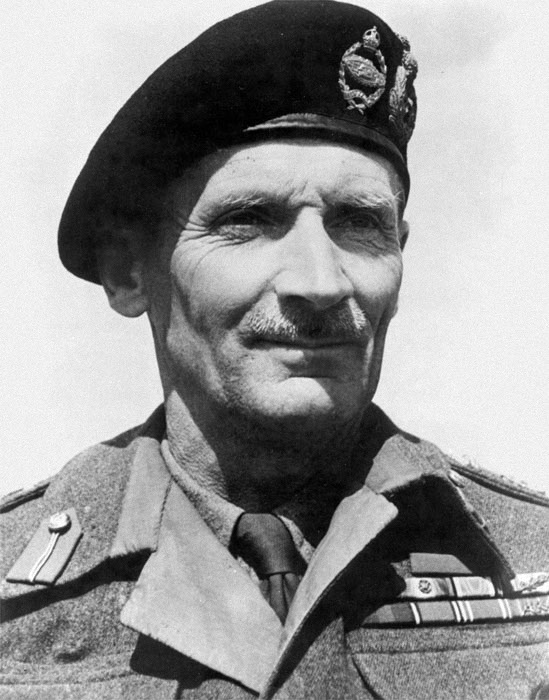
Field Marshal Sir Bernard Montgomery

While agreeing that Montgomery's drive towards the industrial district of the Ruhr in Germany should have priority, Eisenhower still thought it was important to "get Patton moving again". This strategy was contested by Montgomery, who argued that with the supply situation deteriorating, he would not be able to reach the Ruhr, but "a relocation of our present resources of every description would be adequate to get one thrust to Berlin". Montgomery initially suggested Operation Comet, a limited airborne coup de main operation that was to be launched on 2 September 1944. Comet envisioned using British and Polish airborne forces to capture several bridges en route to the Rhine. However several days of poor weather and Montgomery's concerns over increasing levels of German resistance caused him to postpone the operation and then cancel it on 10 September.

Montgomery replaced Comet with Market Garden, a more ambitious plan to bypass the West Wall or Siegfried Line of German defenses by hooking around its northern end and securing a crossing of the Rhine River, thereby gaining a path to the Ruhr. Another factor was the existence of V-2 sites in the Netherlands which were launching rocket strikes on London. On 10 September Dempsey, the British Second Army commander, told Montgomery that he had doubts about this plan. Montgomery replied that he had just received an order from the British government that the V-2 launch sites around The Hague should be neutralised and that the plan must therefore proceed.

That same day, angered by Eisenhower's reluctance to give his plan the priority he desired, Montgomery met with him inside Eisenhower's plane shortly after it arrived at the Brussels airport. Montgomery tore a file of Eisenhower's messages to shreds in front of him, argued for a concentrated northern thrust, and demanded priority in supplies. So fierce and unrestrained was Montgomery's language that Eisenhower reached out, patted Montgomery's knee, and said, "Steady, Monty! You can't talk to me like that. I'm your boss."

Eisenhower allegedly told Montgomery why a "single thrust" toward Berlin was not feasible:

What you're proposing is this – if I give you all the supplies you want, you could go straight to Berlin – right straight (500 miles) to Berlin? Monty, you're nuts. You can't do it... If you try a long column like that in a single thrust you'd have to throw off division after division to protect your flanks from attack.

Nevertheless, Eisenhower consented to Operation Market Garden, giving it "limited priority" in terms of supplies – but only as part of an advance on a broad front. Eisenhower promised that aircraft and trucks would deliver an additional 1,000 tons of supplies daily to Montgomery for Market Garden. (Note: Eisenhower wrote to Montgomery stating that 1,000 tons by air to the "Brussels area" was not possible since the transport aircraft would be given over to the airborne operations but – by temporarily immobilising some American divisions – every effort would be made to deliver 500 tons by road with – while the aircraft were not in use for the airborne operations – 500 tons by air)

Eisenhower was also under pressure from the United States to use the First Allied Airborne Army as soon as possible. After Normandy, most of the airborne forces had been withdrawn to England, re-forming into the First Allied Airborne Army of two British and three US airborne divisions, the Polish 1st Independent Parachute Brigade, and the air-portable 52nd Infantry Division. Eighteen airborne operations had been proposed, then cancelled, when the rapidly moving Allied ground forces overran the intended drop zones. (Note: "Handsup", a drop on Quiberon, was cancelled after naval objections and "Beneficiary", a drop on Saint-Malo, because defences were too strong.) Eisenhower believed that the use of the airborne forces might provide the push needed for the allies to cross the Rhine.

=== The plan ===
The plan of action consisted of two operations:

- Market: airborne forces of Lieutenant General Lewis H. Brereton's First Allied Airborne Army to seize bridges and other terrain, under tactical command of I Airborne Corps under Lieutenant-General Frederick Browning, and
- Garden: ground forces of the Second Army to move north spearheaded by XXX Corps under Lieutenant-General Brian Horrocks.

==== Market ====
Market would employ four of the six divisions of the First Allied Airborne Army. The U.S. 101st Airborne Division, under Major General Maxwell D. Taylor, would drop in two locations just north of XXX Corps to take the bridges north of Eindhoven at Son and Veghel. The 82nd Airborne Division, under Brigadier General James M. Gavin, would drop northeast of them to take the bridges at Grave and Nijmegen. The British 1st Airborne Division, under Major-General Roy Urquhart, with the Polish 1st Independent Parachute Brigade, under Major General Stanisław Sosabowski, attached, would drop at the extreme north end of the route, capturing the road bridge at Arnhem and the rail bridge at Oosterbeek. To permit unrestricted bombing between Nijmegen and Arnhem, 1st Airborne Division would not send forces south to link up with 82nd Airborne Division. The 52nd (Lowland) Infantry Division would be flown to the captured Deelen Airfield north of Arnhem on D+5. (In the event, Deelen was not captured and 52nd Division never flew in.) On D+1, Brereton told Ridgway that once 52nd Division had landed, XVIII Airborne Corps headquarters would fly in to assume command of the two US divisions. I Airborne Corps would then command only 1st Airborne Division, 52nd Division, and the Polish Brigade. No one told Browning about this change.

The First Allied Airborne Army had been created on 16 August as the result of British requests for a coordinated headquarters for airborne operations, a concept approved by General Eisenhower on 20 June. The British had strongly hinted that a British officer – Browning in particular – be appointed its commander. Browning for his part decided to bring his entire staff with him on the operation to establish his field HQ using the much-needed 32 Airspeed Horsa gliders for administrative personnel, and six Waco CG-4A gliders for U.S. Signals' personnel. Since the bulk of both troops and aircraft were American, Brereton, a U.S. Army Air Forces officer, was named by Eisenhower on 16 July and appointed by SHAEF on 2 August. Brereton had no experience in airborne operations but had extensive command experience at the air force level in several theaters, most recently as commander of Ninth Air Force, which gave him a working knowledge of the operations of IX Troop Carrier Command.

A U.S. Army film describing the use of gliders during Operation Market

Market would be the largest airborne operation in history, delivering over 34,600 men of the 101st, 82nd and 1st Airborne Divisions and the Polish Brigade. 14,589 troops were landed by glider and 20,011 by parachute. Gliders also brought in 1,736 vehicles and 263 artillery pieces. 3,342 tons of ammunition and other supplies were brought by glider and parachute drop.

To deliver its 36 battalions of airborne infantry and their support troops to the continent, the First Allied Airborne Army had under its operational control the 14 groups of IX Troop Carrier Command, (Note: After 25 August, IX TCC was removed from Ninth Air Force and placed directly under U.S. Strategic Air Forces.) and after 11 September the 16 squadrons of 38 Group RAF (an organization of converted bombers providing support to resistance groups) and a transport formation, 46 Group.

The combined force had 1,438 C-47/Dakota transports (1,274 USAAF and 164 RAF) and 321 converted RAF bombers. The Allied glider force had been rebuilt after Normandy until by 16 September it numbered 2,160 CG-4A Waco gliders, 916 Airspeed Horsas (812 RAF and 104 U.S. Army) and 64 General Aircraft Hamilcars (large cargo gliders). The U.S. had only 2,060 glider pilots available, so that none of its gliders would have a co-pilot but would instead carry an extra passenger.

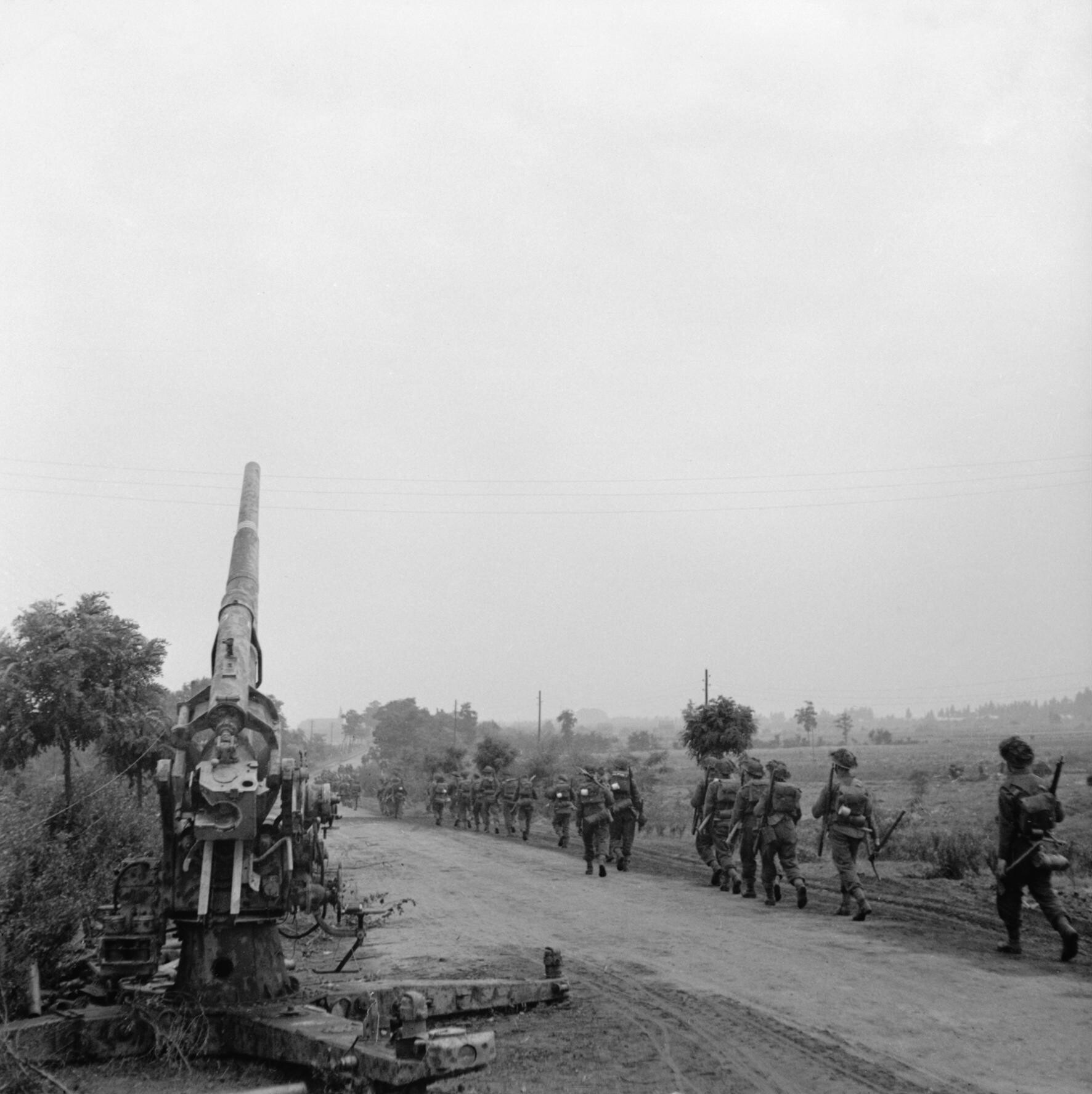
Infantry of 50th (Northumbrian) Division moving up past a knocked-out German 88mm gun near 'Joe's Bridge' over the Meuse-Escaut Canal in Belgium, 16 September 1944

Because the C-47s served as paratrooper transports and glider tugs and because IX Troop Carrier Command would provide all the transports for both British parachute brigades, this massive force could deliver only 60 percent of the ground forces in one lift. This limit was the reason for the decision to split the troop-lift schedule into successive days. Ninety percent of the USAAF transports on the first day would drop parachute troops, with the same proportion towing gliders on the second day (the RAF transports were almost entirely used for glider operations). (Note: 655 of the 700 scheduled RAF sorties on the first two days towed gliders and the RAF only dropped 186 total troops by parachute.) Brereton rejected having two airlifts on the first day, although this had been accomplished during Operation Dragoon, albeit with slightly more daylight (45 minutes) and against negligible opposition. Brereton was concerned that the undermanned groundcrews would not be able to refuel, service, and repair the large number of aircraft quickly enough to perform two lifts in a single day.

17 September was on a dark moon and in the days following it the new moon set before dark. Allied airborne doctrine prohibited big operations in the absence of all light, so the operation would have to be carried out in daylight. The risk of Luftwaffe interception was judged small, given the crushing air superiority of Allied fighters but there were concerns about the increasing number of flak units in the Netherlands, especially around Arnhem. Brereton's experience with tactical air operations judged that flak suppression would be sufficient to permit the troop carriers to operate without prohibitive loss. The invasion of Southern France had demonstrated that large scale daylight airborne operations were feasible. Daylight operations, in contrast to those in Sicily and Normandy, would have much greater navigational accuracy and time-compression of succeeding waves of aircraft, tripling the number of troops that could be delivered per hour. The time required to assemble airborne units on the drop zone after landing would be reduced by two-thirds.

IX Troop Carrier Command's transport aircraft had to tow gliders and drop paratroopers, duties that could not be performed simultaneously. Although every division commander requested two drops on the first day, Brereton's staff scheduled only one lift based on the need to prepare for the first drop by bombarding German flak positions for half a day and a weather forecast on the afternoon of 16 September (which soon proved erroneous) that the area would have clear conditions for four days, so allowing drops during them.

After one week preparations were declared complete. The planning and training for the airborne drops at Sicily and Normandy had taken months. One United States Air Force historian noted that 'Market' was the only large airborne operation of the war in which the USAAF "had no training program, no rehearsals, almost no exercises, and a... low level of tactical training."

Gavin had doubts about the plan. In his diary he wrote, "It looks very rough. If I get through this one I will be very lucky." He was also highly critical of Browning, writing that he "... unquestionably lacks the standing, influence and judgment that comes from a proper troop experience... his staff was superficial... Why the British units fumble along... becomes more and more apparent. Their tops lack the know-how, never do they get down into the dirt and learn the hard way."

==== Garden ====
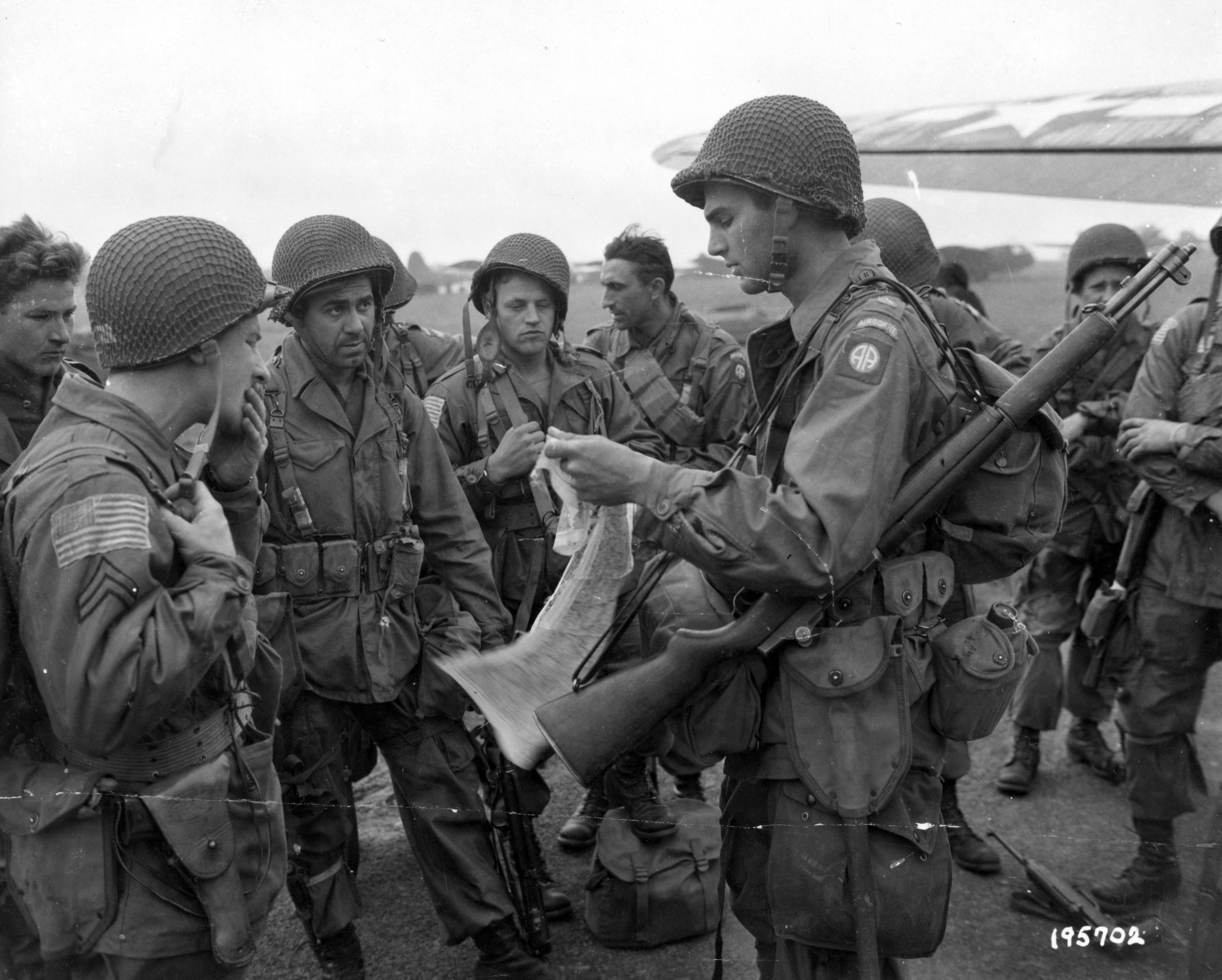
Members of the 82nd Airborne Division at Cottesmore Airfield during preparations for Operation Market Garden, 17 September 1944

Garden consisted primarily of XXX Corps and was initially spearheaded by the Guards Armoured Division, with the 43rd Wessex and 50th Northumbrian Infantry Divisions in reserve. They were expected to arrive at the south end of the 101st Airborne Division's area on the first day, the 82nd's by the second day and the 1st's by the fourth day at the latest. The precise targets were 17 September: 17:00 Eindhoven and midnight Veghel; 18 September: noon Grave and 18:00 Nijmegen; and 19 September: 15:00 Arnhem.

The airborne divisions would then join XXX Corps and advance from the Arnhem bridgehead. Guards Armoured would bypass Apeldoorn and advance to the IJsselmeer near Nunspeet. 43rd Division would form IJssel bridgeheads at Zutphen and Deventer. 50th Division would form an IJssel bridgehead at Doesburg. The Dutch Princess Irene Brigade would liberate and garrison Apeldoorn.

After this, Montgomery's written directive M.525 envisaged XXX Corps advancing towards the eventual strategic objective, Germany's industrial heartland, the Ruhr:

From this position it will be prepared to advance eastwards to the general area RHEINE-OSNABRUCK-HAMM-MUNSTER. In this movement its weight will be on its right and directed towards HAMM, from which place a strong thrust will be made southwards along the eastern face of the RUHR.

However, Eisenhower just wanted to secure bridgeheads over the Nederrijn and IJssel and had not authorised further operations along this axis. Eisenhower had also stipulated on 13 September that the two US divisions were to be released after XXX Corps passed through them, but Montgomery held on to them until November because the operation almost doubled 21st Army Group's frontage and Montgomery needed American assistance to hold it.

Four days was a long time for an airborne force to fight unsupported. Even so, before Operation Market Garden started it seemed to the Allied high command that the German resistance had broken. Most of the German Fifteenth Army in the area appeared to be fleeing from the Canadians and they were known to have no panzer divisions. It was thought that XXX Corps would face limited resistance on their route up Highway 69 and little armour. Meanwhile, the German defenders would be spread out over 100 kilometres (62 mi) trying to contain the pockets of airborne forces, from the Second Army in the south to Arnhem in the north.

=== German preparation ===
The rout of the Wehrmacht during July and August led the Allies to believe that the German army was a spent force unable to reconstitute its shattered units. During those two months the Wehrmacht had suffered a string of defeats with heavy losses. Between 6 June and 14 August it had suffered 23,019 killed in action, 198,616 missing or taken prisoner and 67,240 wounded. Many of the formations the Wehrmacht had at the beginning of the Normandy campaign had been annihilated or reduced to skeleton formations by the end of August. As the German armies retreated towards the German frontier, they were often harried by air attacks and bombing raids by aircraft of the Allied air forces, inflicting casualties and destroying vehicles. Attempts to halt the Allied advance often seemed fruitless as hurried counter-attacks and blocking positions were brushed aside and at times there seemed to be too few German units to hold anywhere. By early September the situation was beginning to change. Between 5 and 21 September, some 65,000 troops of the German Fifteenth Army with 225 guns, 750 trucks, and 1000 horses escaped north across the Scheldt Estuary using a flotilla of commandeered freighters, barges and small boats. From there they moved east along the South Beveland peninsula to mainland Netherlands north of Antwerp. These numbers had been provided in 1946 by General Eugen-Felix Schwalbe, who had directed the army side of the evacuation. During the battle, the Army Group B war diary recorded larger numbers: 82,000 troops, 530 guns, 4600 vehicles, and over 4,000 horses. A third accounting, based on the records of Sonderstab Knuth (the evacuation's naval command), claims that between 4 and 23 September, 89,707 troops, 645 guns, and 6625 vehicles escaped.

Adolf Hitler began to take a personal interest in the apparent disintegration of Army Group B, which comprised the German armies in northern France, Belgium, and the Netherlands. On 4 September he recalled Generalfeldmarschall Gerd von Rundstedt, who had been in retirement since Hitler had dismissed him as Wehrmacht Commander-in-Chief West on 2 July, and reinstated him in his former command, replacing Generalfeldmarschall Walter Model, who had taken command just 18 days previously and would henceforth command only Army Group B. Rundstedt immediately began to plan a defence against what Wehrmacht intelligence judged to be 60 Allied divisions at full strength, although Eisenhower possessed only 49 divisions.

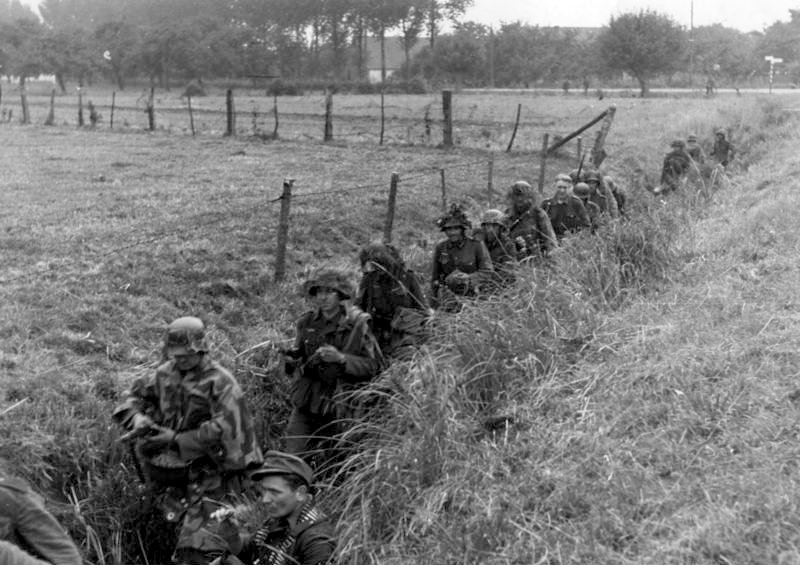
German soldiers at Arnhem

Model set out to stop the Allied advance. The German 719th Infantry Division, part of LXXXVIII Corps, was dispatched south to the Albert Canal and Model requested reinforcements from Germany, stating that he required an additional 25 infantry divisions and six armoured divisions. He envisioned a line stretching from Antwerp along the Albert Canal to Maastricht, then along the Siegfried Line and the Moselle River to Metz. Meanwhile, Colonel General Kurt Student, commander of the Fallschirmjäger, the German airborne forces, received orders from Alfred Jodl, Chief of the Operations Staff of the Oberkommando der Wehrmacht, to immediately move from Berlin and proceed to the Netherlands, where he would collect all available units and build a front near the Albert Canal, which was to be held at all costs. This front was to be held by the new First Parachute Army, which despite its grandiose name was merely a paper formation. Its units were scattered throughout Germany and the Netherlands and were a mixture of new units in the process of being formed and burnt-out remnants being fleshed out with untrained personnel.

Though the situation seemed dire, the German front was starting to form into what Robert Kershaw terms "a crust". Leadership, initiative, and a good staff system were beginning to create an organised push-back out of the initial chaos. On 4 September, the 719th Infantry Division began to dig in along the Albert Canal and was soon joined by forces under the command of Lieutenant General Kurt Chill. Although Chill only officially commanded the 85th Infantry Division, which had suffered heavy casualties during the retreat from Normandy, he had assumed command of the remnants of the 84th and 89th Infantry Divisions en route. Initially ordered to take his command to the Rhineland for rest and reinforcements, Chill disregarded the order and moved his forces to the Albert Canal, linking up with the 719th; he also had "reception centres" set up at the bridges crossing the Albert Canal, where small groups of retreating troops were picked up and turned into ad hoc units. By 7 September the 176th Infantry Division, a Kranken division composed of elderly men and men with various medical complaints, had arrived from the Siegfried Line and elements of the First Parachute Army began to appear. At this stage the Army consisted of approximately seven Fallschirmjaeger regiments composed of some 20,000 airborne troops along with a collection of 20 anti-aircraft batteries and a mix of 25 self-propelled guns and tank destroyers. Kriegsmarine and SS units were also allocated to Student's command, and Hitler had promised Model that 200 Panther tanks would be sent straight from the production lines; he also ordered all Tiger tanks, Jagdpanther tank destroyers, and 88 mm guns that were available in Germany to be transferred to the West.

On 5 September, Model's forces were bolstered by the arrival of the II SS Panzer Corps, which consisted of the 9th and 10th SS Panzer Divisions under the command of Lieutenant General Wilhelm Bittrich. Kershaw, cautioning that his sources were fragmentary, estimated that the Corps had probably been reduced to approximately 6,000–7,000 men, 20–30% of its original strength in the course of continuous action since late June including in the Falaise pocket; losses in officers and NCOs had been especially high. A more recent accounting found that the 9th SS Panzer Division had 6380 men on 3 September and the 10th SS Panzer Division had 7142 men in early September. Model ordered the two divisions to rest and refit in "safe" areas behind the new German line; these areas coincidentally were to be Eindhoven and Arnhem. The 10th SS Panzer Division was to be restored to full strength in order to provide an armoured reserve and thus the 9th SS Panzer Division was ordered to transfer all of its heavy equipment to its sister division; it was intended that the 9th would then be transported to Germany for replenishment. At the time of Operation Market Garden, the 10th SS Panzer Division had an approximate strength of 3,000 men; an armoured infantry regiment, divisional reconnaissance battalion, two artillery battalions, and an engineer battalion, all partially motorised. (Note: The 9th SS Panzer Division was organized into the divisional reconnaissance battalion and 19 Alarmheiten (Alarm Companies) trained to head towards the sound of gunfire, each being about 130 men.) However, Bittrich said after the war that he only had five tanks at Arnhem. Other formations were appearing to strengthen the German defences. Between 16 and 17 September, the 59th and 245th Infantry Divisions from Fifteenth Army assembled in Brabant, under strength but well-equipped and able to act as a reserve. Near Eindhoven and Arnhem a number of scratch formations were being assembled. Several SS units, including an NCO training battalion and a Panzergrenadier reserve battalion, were being prepared to enter combat and Luftwaffe and Kriegsmarine personnel were being grouped into Fliegerhorst and Schiffstammabteilung formations. There were also a number of training battalions that were being equipped, several depot battalions from the Panzer Division Hermann Göring and various artillery, anti-aircraft, and field police units scattered throughout the north of the Netherlands.

=== Intelligence ===
==== German ====
Rundstedt and Model suspected that a large Allied offensive was imminent, having received many intelligence reports that described a 'constant stream' of reinforcements to the right wing of the British Second Army. Anthony Blunt is accused of passing information from MI5. The senior intelligence officer of Army Group B believed the Second Army would launch an offensive in the direction of Nijmegen, Arnhem and Wesel with a primary objective of reaching the industrial area along the Ruhr river. He was convinced that airborne troops would be used in this offensive but was unsure where they would be deployed, suspecting areas along the Siegfried Line north of Aachen or possibly even near the Saar. Second Army would assemble its units at the Maas-Scheldt and Albert Canals. The right wing of the Army would be the assault force, composed primarily of armoured units, which would force a crossing of the Maas and attempt to break through to the Ruhr industrial area near Roermond. The left wing would cover the Army's northern flank by moving up to the Waal near Nijmegen and isolating the German 15th Army situated on the Dutch coast.

==== Allied ====
A number of reports about German troop movements reached Allied high command, including details of the identity and location of German armoured formations. The UK Government Code and Cypher School at Bletchley Park which monitored and decrypted German radio traffic produced intelligence reports codenamed Ultra. These were sent to senior Allied commanders, but they only reached army headquarters level and were not passed down any lower. Ultra reports revealed the movement of the 9th SS and 10th SS Panzer Divisions to the area north and east of Arnhem, creating enough concern for Eisenhower to send his chief of staff, Lieutenant General Walter Bedell Smith, to raise the issue with Montgomery on 15 September. Eisenhower, having already approved Montgomery's operation, felt that only Montgomery could alter or cancel it. However, Montgomery dismissed Smith's concerns and refused to alter the plans for the landing of 1st Airborne Division at Arnhem. In his memoirs, Montgomery admitted: "The 2nd S.S. Panzer Corps was refitting in the Arnhem area, having limped there. But we were wrong in supposing it could not fight effectively; its battle state was far beyond our expectation." The intelligence was not, however, withheld from the 1st Airborne Division. The 1st Parachute Brigade's Intelligence Summary No. 1 dated 13 September said: "a reported concentration of 10,000 troops SW of ZWOLLE on 1 Sep may represent a battle scarred panzer division or two reforming". As a result, when some gliders were deducted from 1st Airborne Division's first lift in order to transport the I Airborne Corps HQ, Urquhart ensured that this would not bump any anti-tank guns to the second lift.

The intelligence officer of I Airborne Corps, Major Brian Urquhart, received information from members of the Dutch Resistance that the SS Divisions were in the area, although they did not specify if there were tanks. He therefore requested aerial reconnaissance of the Arnhem area. Aerial photographs of Arnhem taken by a photo-reconnaissance Spitfire XI from RAF's No. 16 Squadron on 12 September showed tanks in the area. However, most of the original photos have disappeared and this cannot be verified. The only tanks partly visible in the remaining images are probably a short-barrelled Panzer IV and a Panzer III, both of which were unlikely to be from the 9th and 10th SS. The 9th and 10th SS had Panthers and long-barreled Panzer IVs. The tanks likely belonged to the II./Fallschirm-Panzer Ersatz und Ausbildungs Regiment Hermann Göring, which was later located near Son (north of Eindhoven) on 17 September. Fearing that 1st Airborne Division might be in grave danger if it landed at Arnhem, Urquhart arranged a meeting with Browning and informed him of the armour present at Arnhem. Browning dismissed his claims and ordered the division's senior medical officer to send Urquhart on sick leave on account of "nervous strain and exhaustion".

The 9th SS and 10th SS Panzer Divisions actually had very few tanks with them. 9th SS had 2 operational Panthers and 10th SS had between 5 and 14 operational Panzer IVs. In fact, no German tanks were involved in the battle on the first day. The 9th SS Panthers later fought in the Oosterbeek area (earliest sightings on 19 September) and were damaged on 20 and 23 September. On the 18th, two 10th SS tanks attacked the Arnhem bridge area with Euling's infantry battalion but they were withdrawn later in the day and sent towards the Nijmegen area. On the 19th, the 2nd South Staffordshires encountered a tank that was from one of the two divisions. Field Marshal Walter Model was, coincidentally, in Oosterbeek and it was he who ordered all available armoured vehicles to the area. It was this rapid reaction by the Army Group B commander that resulted in large numbers of Axis armour at Arnhem, rather than the presence of the SS Divisions.

The Allies severely underestimated the German ability to reorganize stragglers into effective units. Allied intelligence reported the numerous stragglers pouring into Germany but discounted them. A Second Army intelligence summary from 17 September said, "[I]t is considered unlikely that any large scale reinforcements can be made available, and the battle now joined will be fought out by the troops on the ground, with the uncertain addition of some troops south of the River Scheldt. They will not amount to much." After the war, John Hackett (commander of 4th Parachute Brigade) noted that a German headquarters could take control of a group of stragglers and function as a cohesive and aggressive unit in an amount of time that the Allies thought impossibly short. "You have never fought in a [real] war, until you have fought Germans."

== Battle ==
=== Day 1: Sunday, 17 September 1944 ===
==== Early successes ====
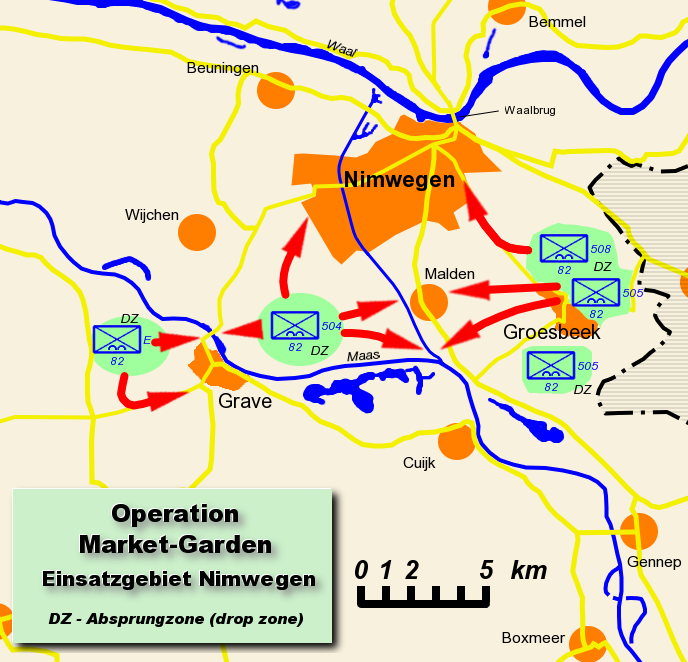
Allied landings near Nijmegen

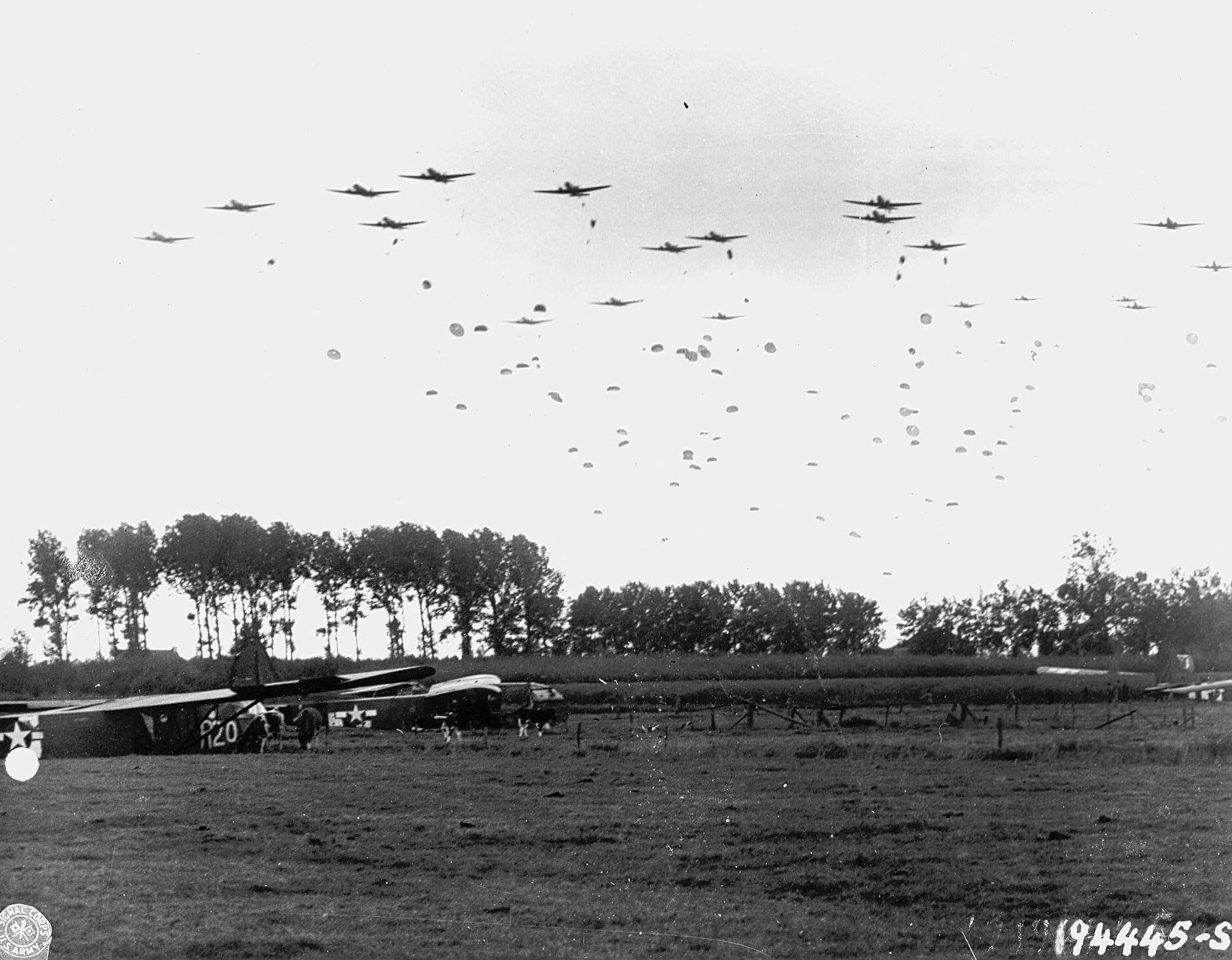
The 82nd Airborne Division drops near Grave (National Archives)

Operation Market Garden opened with Allied success all round. In the first landing, almost all troops arrived on top of their drop zones without incident. In the 82nd Airborne Division, 89% of troops landed on or within 1,000 metres (3,300 ft) of their drop zones and 84% of gliders landed on or within 1,000 metres (3,300 ft) of their landing zones. This contrasted with previous operations where night drops had resulted in units being scattered by up to 19 kilometres (12 mi). Losses to enemy aircraft and flak were light; German flak was described in reports as "heavy but inaccurate". By the end of the first day all water crossings were – with the exception of the large Nijmegen bridge – 100 percent in Allied hands or with German troops prevented from using the crossings.

In the south, the 101st met little resistance and captured four of five bridges assigned to them. After a brief delay caused by four 88 mm guns and a machine gun post, the bridge at Son was blown up by the Germans on approach. Later that day several small attacks by the German 59th Infantry Division were beaten off. Small units of the 101st moved south of Son, towards Eindhoven. Later that day they made contact with German forces.

To their north, the 82nd arrived with a small group dropped near Grave securing the bridge. They also succeeded in capturing one of the vitally important bridges over the Maas-Waal canal, the lock-bridge at Heumen. The 82nd concentrated their efforts to seize the Groesbeek Heights instead of capturing their prime objective, the Nijmegen bridge. The capture of the Groesbeek Heights was to set up a blocking position on the high ground to prevent a German attack out of the nearby Klever Reichswald and to deny the heights to German artillery observers. Browning, the commander of the 1st Airborne Army agreed with the assertions of Gavin, the commander of the 82nd, that Groesbeek Heights were the priority. Gavin wanted to occupy the Grave and the Maas (Meuse)-Waal canal bridges before Nijmegen bridge. He would attempt to seize the Nijmegen bridge only when these were secure, thus releasing troops for Nijmegen.

Before the operation on 15 September Gavin verbally ordered Lt-Col Lindquist of the 508th Parachute Infantry Regiment to send a battalion to the Nijmegen bridge after landing. He had decided that there were enough troops for the other objectives. Lindquist later said he understood he should send a battalion after his regiment had completed their earlier assigned targets. Lindquist's battalion approached the bridge that evening delaying the seizure of the bridge. The battalion was stopped by a SS unit that had driven south from Arnhem. A part of the SS unit returned to Arnhem but found the northern end of the Arnhem bridge occupied by the British 1st Airborne. In an attempt to cross the bridge most of the SS unit was killed, including the commander.

The 508th was tasked with taking the 600-metre (2,000 ft) long Nijmegen highway bridge if possible but because of miscommunication they did not start until late in the day. General Gavin's orders to Colonel Lindquist of the 508th were to "move without delay" onto the Nijmegen road bridge. Lindquist's 508th started jumping at 13:28 with 1,922 men. The jump was perfect with the regiment 90% assembled by 15:00. The commander of 3rd Battalion wrote later that..."we could not have landed better under any circumstances". The 508th was still sitting around when Gavin asked them at 18:00 if they had got to the bridge yet.

They faced the same disadvantage as the British at Arnhem in dropping many miles from their objective. If they had attacked earlier they would have faced only a dozen German bridge guards. By the time the 508th attacked, troops of the 10th SS Reconnaissance Battalion were arriving. The attack failed, leaving the Nijmegen bridge in German hands.

Capturing this bridge was vital. Unlike some of the bridges to the south which were over smaller rivers and canals that could be bridged by engineering units, the Nijmegen and Arnhem bridges crossed two arms of the Rhine that could not be bridged easily. If either the Nijmegen or the Arnhem bridge was not captured and held, the advance of XXX Corps would be blocked and Operation Market Garden would fail.

==== British landings ====
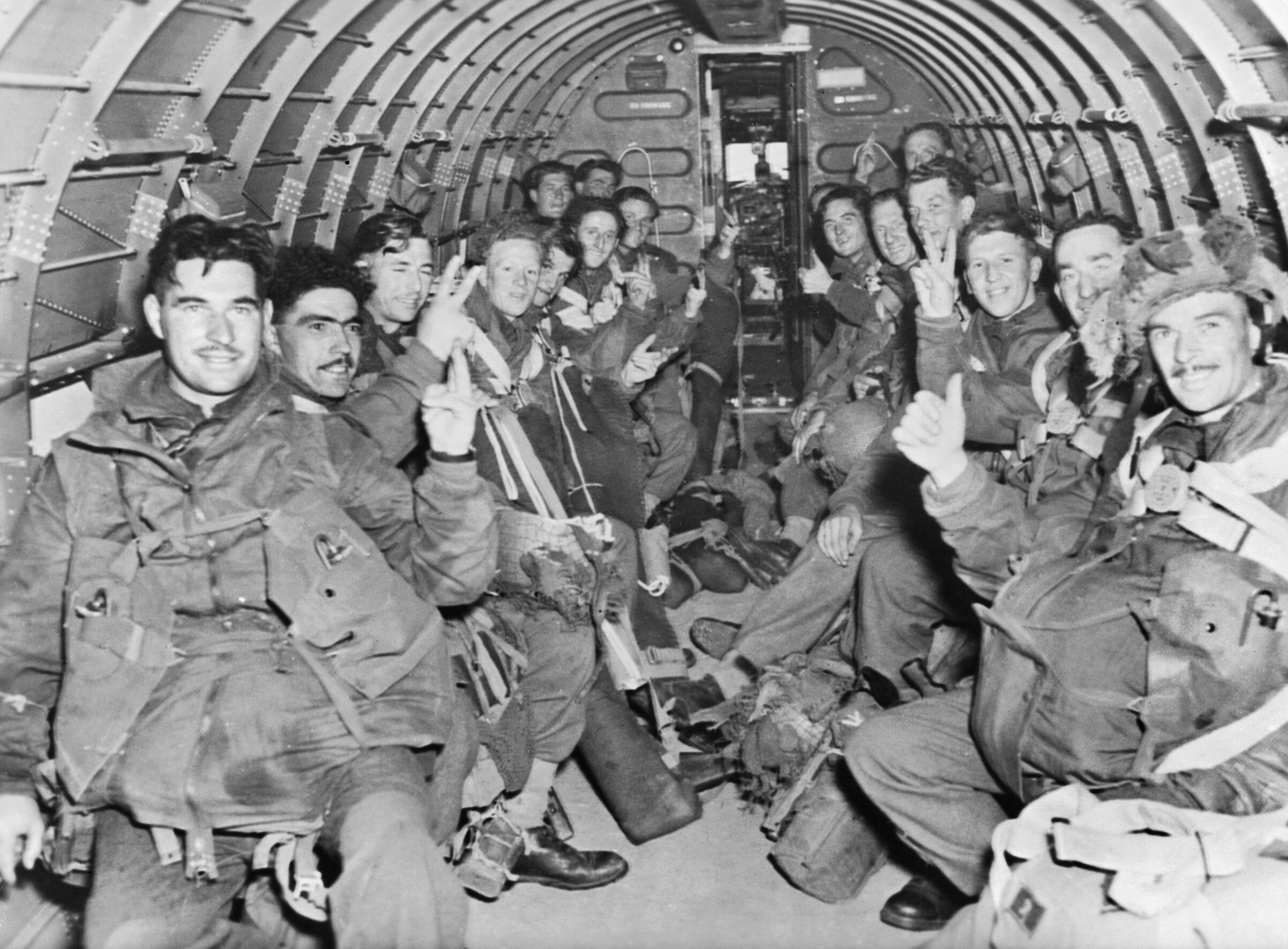
Paratroopers of the 3rd Parachute Battalion, 1st Airborne Division, inside an RAF Dakota (C-47) during the flight to Arnhem, 17 September 1944

The 1st Airborne Division landed at 13:30 without serious incident, but problems associated with the poor plan began soon afterward. Only half of the division arrived with the first lift and only half of these (1st Parachute Brigade) could advance on the bridge. The remaining troops had to defend the drop zones overnight for the arrival of the second lift on the following day. Thus, the division's primary objective had to be tackled by less than half a brigade. While the paratroopers marched eastwards to Arnhem, the Reconnaissance Squadron were to race to the bridge in their jeeps and hold it until the rest of the brigade arrived. The unit set off to the bridge late; and having travelled only a short distance, the vanguard was halted by a strong German defensive position. Hence, the squadron could make no further progress; this had grave consequences.

Five hours after the initial landing, feeling that the British were tied down in Arnhem, the Reconnaissance Battalion of the 9th SS Panzer Division was able to cross the Arnhem bridge and drive to Nijmegen and the bridge over the Waal branch of the Rhine. No British airborne unit was at the bridge.

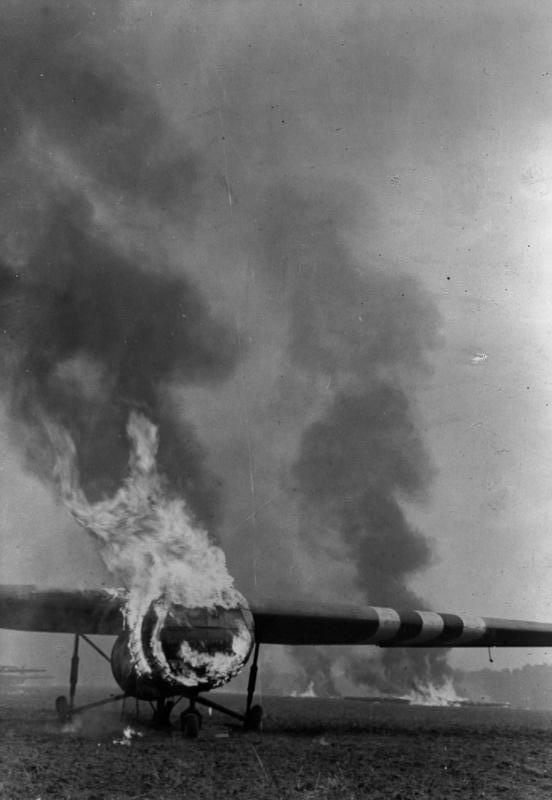
Burning British Horsa glider

Arnhem veteran Tom Hicks, of 1st Parachute Squadron of the Royal Engineers, described the problems the paratroops faced: "They (the Germans) had guns that out-ranged ours. We had no artillery with us so they could just lay off and pick you off kind of thing. If we wanted to get a gun out of action we had to send a patrol out, do it man to man kind of thing."

Two of the three battalions of the 1st Parachute Brigade were slowed down by Krafft's 16th SS Panzergrenadier Training and Replacement Battalion, Allwörden's 9th SS Panzerjäger Battalion, two infantry alarm companies formed from Spindler's 9th SS Panzer Artillery Regiment, and ten half-tracks detached from Gräbner's 9th SS Reconnaissance Battalion, which had all quickly established a thin blocking line covering the obvious routes into Arnhem. Lieutenant-Colonel John Frost's 2nd Parachute Battalion, advancing eastwards along the southernmost road into Arnhem near the Rhine, found their route largely undefended. They arrived at the bridge in the evening and set up defensive positions at the north end. They were joined by Brigade HQ, led by Major Tony Hibbert, which was the brigade's only other unit to reach the bridge.

Two attempts to capture the arched steel bridge and its southern approach failed. Of the other battalions, the 3rd Parachute Battalion had covered only half the distance to the bridge when they halted for the night, the rear of their column being under attack and needing time to catch up. The 1st Parachute Battalion was similarly fragmented, yet pushed on around the flank of the German line throughout the night. Frequent skirmishes resulted in their making little more progress. The 3rd Battalion under Captain James Cleminson (later, Sir James Cleminson), ambushed a German staff car and killed the commander of Arnhem's garrison, Major-General Friedrich Kussin, as well as his aide and his driver. Cleminson would receive the Military Cross (MC) for this action.

==== Communication breakdown ====
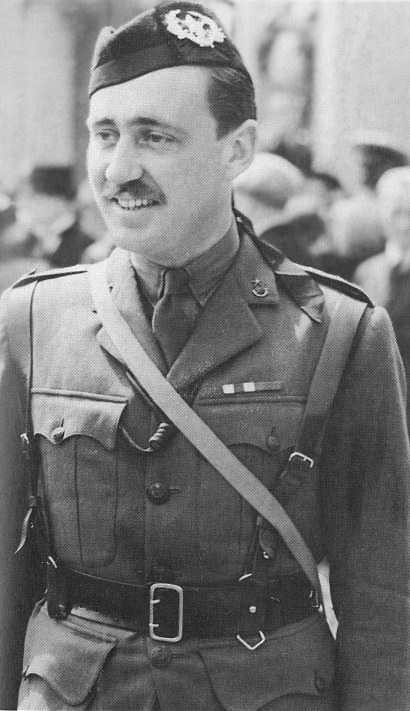
John Frost, leading officer of the Bruneval Raid (Operation Biting), on 27 February 1942. Photographed after receiving the Military Cross for his part in the Bruneval Raid, 1942. At this time the Parachute Regiment did not have its own insignia or uniform; Frost wore his Cameronians uniform.

Some loss of communication between the bridge and divisional headquarters in one of the drop zones was expected, because 13 km (8.1 mi) separated them and the main radio was the Type 22 set, with an effective range of 5 km (3.1 mi). The British radios did not function at any range; some had difficulty receiving signals from just a few hundred metres and others received nothing at all. It was found after landing that the radios had been set to different frequencies, two of which coincided with German and British public broadcasting stations. Other theories have been advanced to explain the greatly reduced range of the 1st Airborne Division radio sets. Thus communication between 1st Airborne units was poor while German defences were being coordinated and reinforced. John Greenacre's study points out that radio communications failures were experienced by the division before, were warned about prior to the operation and provided for by bringing extra field telephone wire. The more powerful WS19HP set was used by the 1st Brigade on D+1.

The only means of calling for air support was through two special American units dropped with the 1st Airborne Division. These units were equipped with "Veeps": jeeps having Very High Frequency SCR-193 crystal sets. It was found impossible to communicate with aircraft on the higher of two frequencies for this and the sets could not be tuned to the lower frequency. Despite efforts to re-tune them, one set was soon destroyed by mortar fire and the other abandoned the next day, cutting the only possible link with RAF fighter-bombers. The pilots were under orders not to attack on their own initiative, since from the air there was no easy way to distinguish friend from foe; together with poor weather, this led to a lack of air support. After the war it was found that the Royal Corps of Signals was either unaware or failed to tell divisional signals of the communication problems identified in November 1943 due to sun spots by the Scientific Advisor's Office to the 21st Army Group. Urquhart ordered the 4-metre (13 ft) aerials to be used, which were useless due to the physics of radio propagation. The wrong frequencies were part of the same problem due to signals personnel not knowing the science of radio communications.

==== XXX Corps advance ====
On the morning of 17 September Horrocks was given confirmation that the operation was to take place that day. At 12:30 hours Horrocks received a signal that the first wave of the airborne forces had left their bases within the United Kingdom and set the time for the ground attack to start at 14:35 hours. At 14:15 hours 300 guns of the Corps artillery opened fire, firing a creeping barrage in front of XXX Corps start line that was 1 mile (1.6 km) wide and 5 miles (8.0 km) in depth. The barrage was supported by seven squadrons of RAF Hawker Typhoons firing rockets at all known German positions along the road to Valkenswaard. The advance was led by tanks and infantry of the Irish Guards and started on time when Lieutenant Keith Heathcote, commanding the lead tank, ordered his driver to advance. The lead units of the Irish Guards Group had broken out of the XXX Corps bridgehead on the Maas-Schelde canal and crossed into the Netherlands by 15:00 hours. After crossing the border the Irish Guards were ambushed by infantry and anti-tank guns dug in on both sides of the main road. Portions of the artillery barrage were refired and fresh waves of Hawker Typhoons were called in.

The Guardsmen moved forward to clear the German positions, manned by elements from two German parachute battalions and two battalions of the 9th SS Panzer Division and soon routed the German forces flanking the road. Interrogation of captured German soldiers led to some of them willingly, others after being threatened, pointing out the remaining German positions. The fighting soon died down and the advance resumed. By last light the town of Valkenswaard had been reached and occupied by the Irish Guards Group. Horrocks had expected that the Irish Guards would have been able to advance the 13 miles (21 km) to Eindhoven within two to three hours but they had only covered 7 miles (11 km). The operation was already starting to fall behind schedule. In Valkenswaard engineers were moved up to construct a 190 feet (58 m) Class 40 Bailey bridge over a stream, which was completed within 12 hours.

Horrocks claimed that the halt at Valkenswaard was ordered by the 5th Guards Brigade commander, Norman Gwatkin, and denied that this was a sign of lack of urgency. They had learned that the Son bridge had been blown and "They had been fighting hard and tanks require maintenance. In my opinion it was the act of an experienced commander to halt, rest his troops, etc., while the bridge was being repaired." Lieutenant Colonel Joe Vandeleur of the Irish Guards recalled that Gwatkin told him to "Push on to Eindhoven tomorrow, old boy, but take your time. We've lost a bridge." However, the bridge repairs would not actually commence until 21:00 on 18 September because the XXX Corps bridging material was in the column following the Guards. An alternative explanation is that the Guards chose to wait for units of the 50th Infantry Division to catch up and take over responsibility for Valkenswaard.

==== German reactions ====
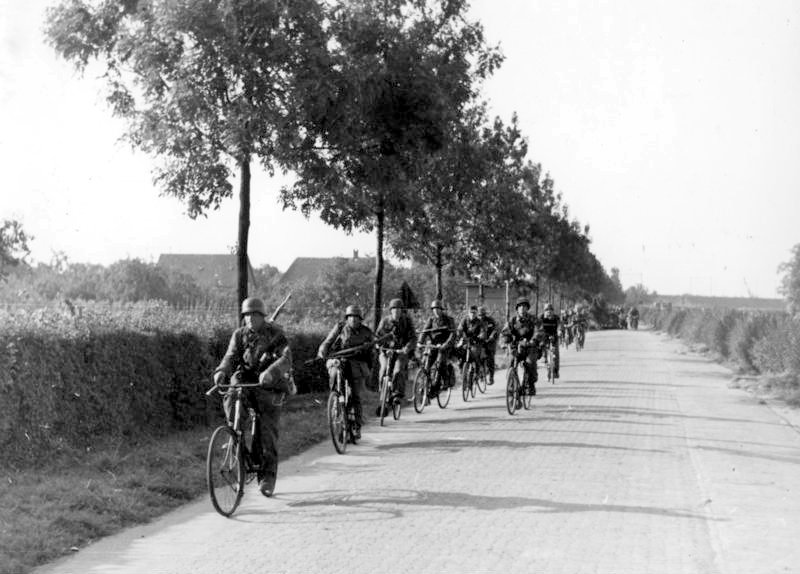
SS troops advancing on bicycles

Model was staying at the Tafelberg Hotel in Oosterbeek, a village to the west of Arnhem, when the British began to land in the countryside to the west of Oosterbeek. He rapidly deduced the likely focus of the attack and after evacuating his headquarters, organised a defense. Bittrich sent a reconnaissance company of the 9th SS Panzer Division to Nijmegen to reinforce the bridge defenses. By midnight, Model had gained a clear picture of the situation and had organised the defense of Arnhem. The confusion usually caused by airborne operations was absent at Arnhem and the advantage of surprise was lost. During the operation, the Germans allegedly recovered a copy of the Market Garden plan from the body of an American officer, who should not have carried it into combat.

=== Day 2: Monday 18 September ===
Allied weather forecasters correctly predicted that England would be covered in fog on the morning of 18 September. The Second Lift was postponed for three hours and thick low clouds began to develop over the southern part of the battle zone, spreading during the day over the area, hampering supply and air support (Seven of the next eight days had poor weather and all air operations were cancelled on 22 and 24 September).

==== 1st Airborne zone ====
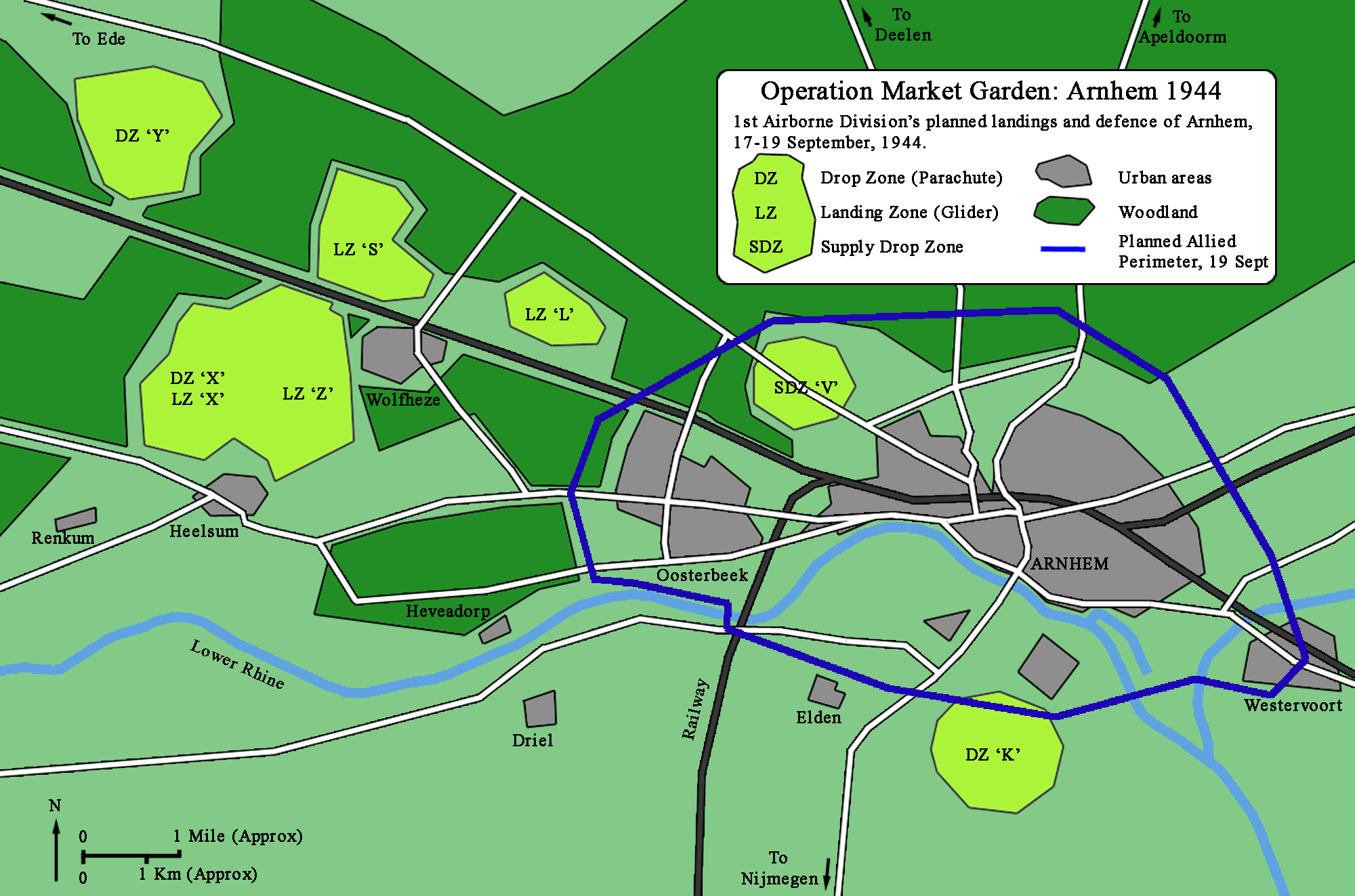
British landings in Arnhem

The 1st and 3rd Parachute Battalions pushed towards the Arnhem bridge during the early hours and had made good progress but they were frequently halted in skirmishes as soon as it became light. With their long and unwieldy columns having to halt to beat off attacks whilst the troops in front carried on unaware, the Germans delayed segments of the two battalions, fragmented them and mopped up the remnants.

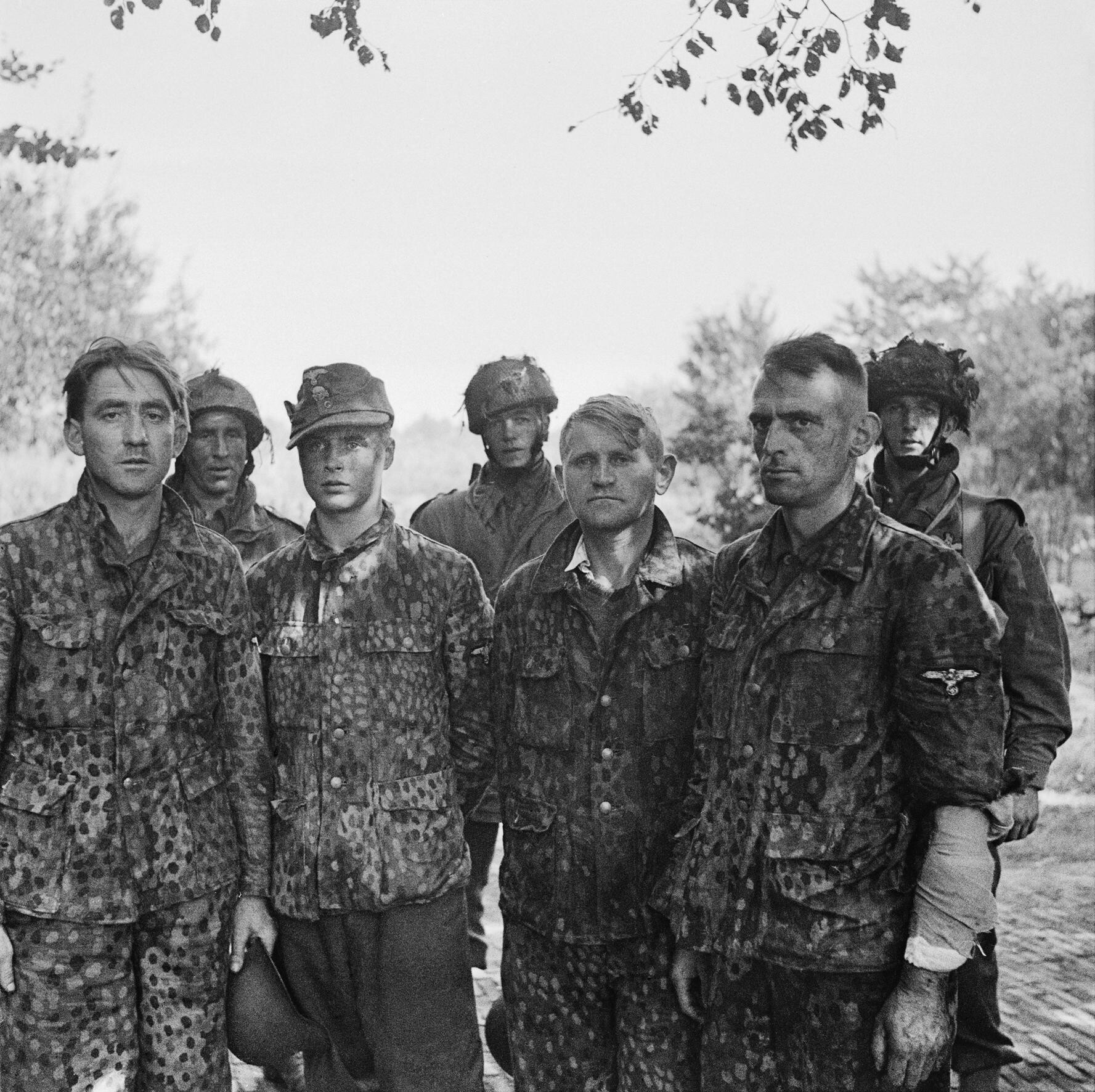
Four Waffen SS troopers taken prisoner, 18 September 1944.

Early in the day the 9th SS Reconnaissance Battalion (sent south the day before) concluded it was not needed in Nijmegen and returned to Arnhem. Though aware of the British troops at the bridge, it attempted to cross by force and was beaten back with heavy losses, including its commanding officer, SS-Hauptsturmführer Viktor Gräbner.

By the end of the day the 1st and 3rd Parachute Battalions had entered Arnhem and were within 2 km (1.2 mi) of the bridge with approximately 200 men, one-sixth their original strength. Most of the officers and non-commissioned officers had been killed, wounded or captured. The Second Lift was delayed by fog and jumped onto a landing zone under heavy attack but landed at full strength. The 4th Parachute Brigade, consisting of the 10th, 11th and 156th Battalions of the Parachute Regiment and commanded by Brigadier-General John Winthrop Hackett, dropped on DZ Y while C and D Companies of the 2nd South Staffordshire Regiment landed on LZ S.

==== 82nd Airborne zone ====
Grave proved to be well defended and German forces continued to press on the 82nd deployed on the Groesbeek heights to the east of Nijmegen. The 505th Parachute Infantry Regiment defended against German attacks in Horst, Grafwegen and Riethorst. Early in the day, German counterattacks seized one of the Allied landing zones where the Second Lift was scheduled to arrive at 13:00. The 508th Parachute Infantry Regiment attacked at 13:10 and cleared the landing zone by 14:00, capturing 16 German Flak pieces and 149 prisoners. Delayed by weather in Britain, the Second Lift did not arrive until 15:30. This lift brought in elements of the 319th and 320th Glider Field Artillery battalions, the 456th Parachute Field Artillery battalion and medical support elements. Twenty minutes later, 135 B-24 bombers dropped supplies from low level.

==== 101st Airborne zone ====
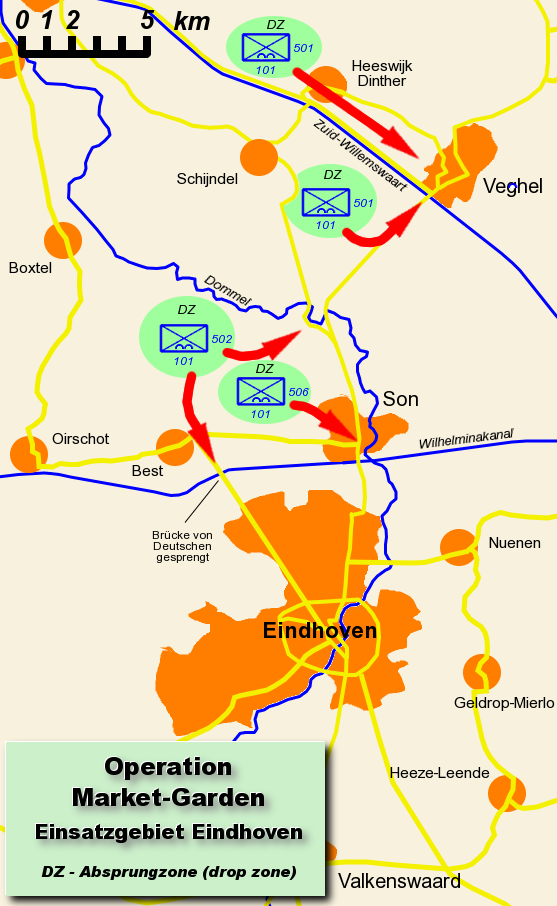
U.S. landings near Eindhoven

Faced with the loss of the bridge at Son, a 101st attempt to capture a similar bridge a few kilometres away at Best found the approach blocked. Other units continued moving to the south and eventually reached the northern end of Eindhoven. At 07:00 the Guards Armoured's reconnaissance regiment resumed the advance, but the Irish Guards Group's infantry and armour waited until 09:00 and 10:00, respectively, for the 50th Infantry Division to catch up. Aalst, defended by three Sturmgeschütze and the remnants of Kerutt's I./18 Fallschirmjäger Battalion, was cleared by late morning. Up the road, recon encountered four of Köppel's 88mm flak guns defending a bridge over the Dommel. British artillery failed to neutralize them, so recon was sent to find an alternative route to the east and the Grenadier Guards Group tried to bypass Aalst and Eindhoven to the west. Joe Vandeleur felt this was a good time to take a break, so he halted the Irish Guards column at noon, took a bath in a swimming pool, and drank champagne with a female war correspondent. At 12:30 two vehicles scouting the Grenadier Guards' route linked up with the 101st Airborne at the Son bridge site, but the main body could not follow because the bridges could not support tanks. The Americans told them what bridging equipment was required, the information was relayed back to XXX Corps, and a bridging unit was dispatched. A British recon squadron found a river crossing a mile north of the roadblock and attacked Köppel's flak battery from the rear. At 17:00 the flak gunners withdrew, allowing the Irish Guards to reach Eindhoven at 18:00 and the Son bridge area at 19:00. By nightfall, the Guards Armoured Division had established itself in the Eindhoven area. Transport columns were jammed in the packed streets of the town, and were subjected to German air raids during the night.

XXX Corps engineers, supported by German prisoners of war, constructed a class 40 Bailey bridge within 10 hours across the Wilhelmina Canal. During the day the British VIII and XII Corps, supporting the main attack, had forged bridgeheads across Meuse-Escaut Canal while facing stiff German resistance. The 50th (Northumbrian) Infantry Division was transferred from XXX Corps to VIII Corps to relieve XXX Corps from having to secure the ground gained thus far. Throughout the day German attacks were launched against XXX Corps and against the new bridgeheads over the Meuse–Escaut Canal, all without success.

=== Day 3: Tuesday 19 September ===
==== Arnhem ====
At 03:00 the commanders of the 2nd Battalion and the 1st and 11th Parachute Battalions met to plan their attack. At 04:30, before dawn, the 1st Parachute Brigade began its attack towards Arnhem Bridge, with the 1st Battalion leading supported by remnants of the 3rd Battalion, with the 2nd South Staffordshires on the 1st Battalion's left flank and the 11th Battalion following. As soon as it became light the 1st Battalion was spotted and halted by fire from the main German defensive line. Trapped in open ground and under heavy fire from three sides, the 1st Battalion disintegrated and what remained of the 3rd Battalion fell back. The 2nd South Staffordshires were similarly cut off and, save for about 150 men, overcome by midday. The 11th Battalion, (which had stayed out of much of the fighting) was then overwhelmed in exposed positions while attempting to capture high ground to the north. With no hope of breaking through, the 500 remaining men of these four battalions withdrew westwards in the direction of the main force, 5 km (3.1 mi) away in Oosterbeek.

The 2nd Battalion and attached units (approximately 740–750 men) were still in control of the northern approach ramp to the Arnhem bridge. They had been ceaselessly bombarded by enemy tanks and artillery from two battle groups led by SS-Sturmbannführer Brinkmann and one commanded by Major Hans-Peter Knaust. The Germans recognised that they would not be moved by infantry attacks such as those that had been bloodily repulsed on the previous day so instead they heavily shelled the short British perimeter with mortars, artillery and tanks; systematically demolishing each house to enable their infantry to exploit gaps and dislodge the defenders. Although in battle against enormous odds, the British clung to their positions and much of the perimeter was held. More recent research by Zwarts shows that Brinkmann's unit had left the area and that Kampfgruppe Knaust and I./21 Panzergrenadier Battalion were commanded by Hans-Georg Sonnenstuhl, commander of 10th SS Panzer Division's artillery regiment.

==== Oosterbeek ====
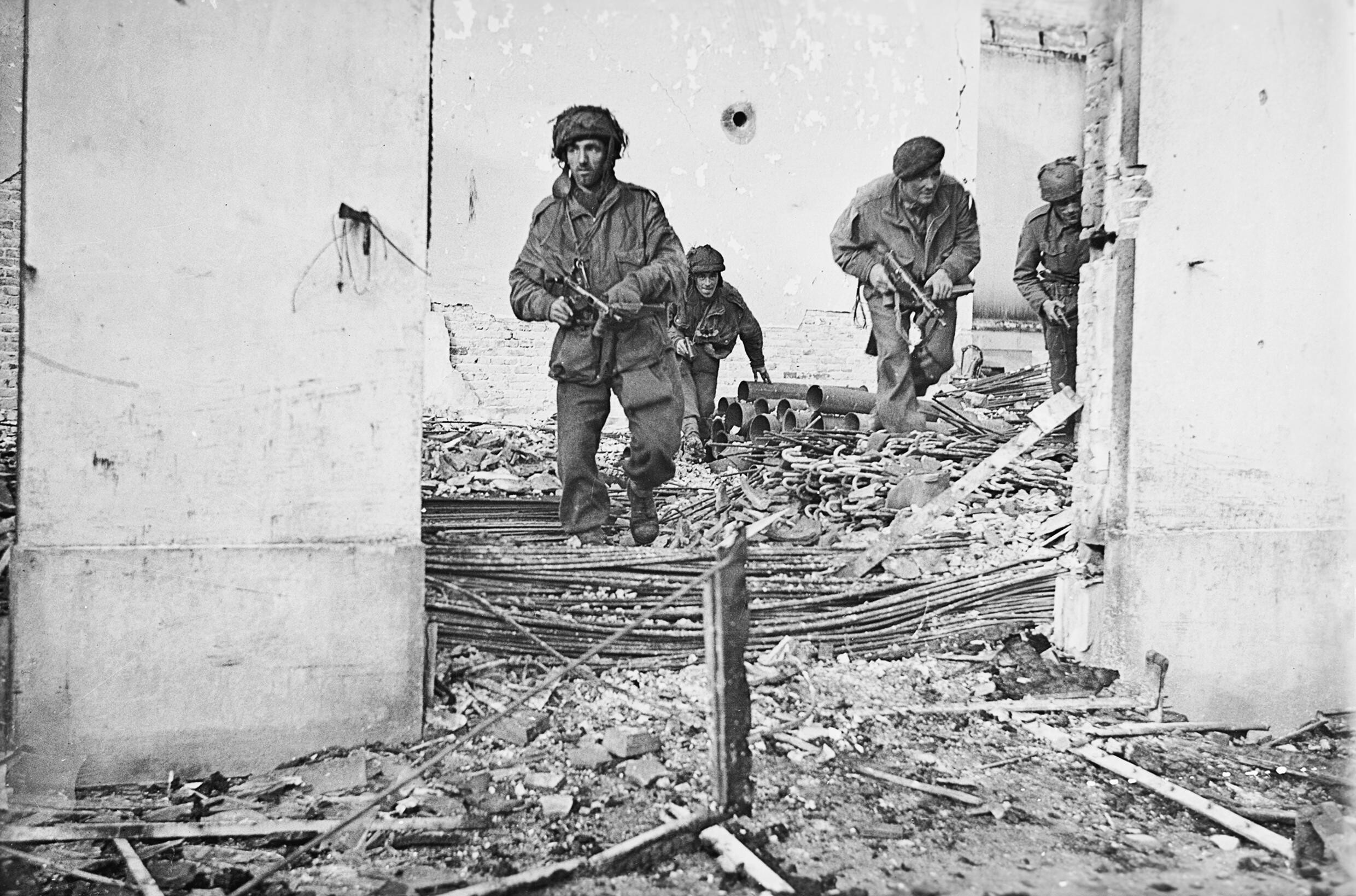
British paratroopers in Oosterbeek

To the north of Oosterbeek, the 4th Parachute Brigade led an attempt by the 1st Airborne Division to break through the German lines, but communication difficulties between British paratroopers and General Frederick Browning and the Americans, and enemy resistance, caused the attack to fail with heavy losses. The 1st Airborne Division, scattered far and wide and hard pressed by the enemy on all sides, had lost its offensive capability. Unable to help Lt.-Col. Frost, who commanded the only battalion that had made it to the Arnhem bridge, the remaining soldiers attempted to withdraw into a defensive pocket at Oosterbeek and hold a bridgehead on the north bank of the Rhine after overwhelming German resistance.

At 16:00 hours the British 4th Parachute Brigade's withdrawal coincided with the arrival of an estimated 30 gliders at Landing Zone L: 28 containing a portion of the 1st Polish Independent Parachute Brigade and its anti-tank battery and 2 containing carry-overs from the second lift. The lift originally had 35 Polish gliders and 8 carry-overs but had taken losses along the way. Landing Zone L was under attack by Kampfgruppe Krafft. Most of the gliders made good landings but they had to unload under fire with the assistance of 7th King's Own Scottish Borderers. Of the eight 6-pounder guns that arrived, only three were unloaded. The drop of the remainder of the Polish paratroopers and General Sosabowski was postponed due to dense fog over their airfields.

==== Nijmegen ====
At 08:20, the 504th Parachute Infantry Regiment made contact with the Grenadier Guards of XXX Corps advancing north at Grave. This enabled the regiment to move on to other missions and place the 3rd Battalion in division reserve. XXX Corps were eight miles (13 km) from Arnhem with six hours in hand, "The earlier delays had been made up". Control of all troops now fell to XXX Corps whose prime objective was to seize the Nijmegen bridge, having two companies from the Guards Armoured Division assisted by the US 2nd Battalion, 505th Parachute Infantry Regiment. The attack got within 400 metres (440 yards) of the bridge before being halted; skirmishing continued throughout the night. A plan was made to attack the south end of the bridge again with support from the 3rd Battalion, 504th Parachute Infantry Regiment, who would cross the River Waal in boats 2 km (1.2 mi) downstream of the bridge and then attack the north end. The boats were requested for late afternoon but they did not arrive as requested. The 1st and 5th Battalions, Coldstream Guards, were attached to the division. A supply attempt by 35 C-47s (out of 60 sent) failed; the supplies were dropped from a high altitude and could not be recovered. Bad weather in England repeatedly delayed the planned glider lift carrying the 325th Glider Infantry Regiment, which had been scheduled to reinforce the 82nd Airborne Division on 19 September. The regiment did not arrive until 23 September, leaving the division without the planned reinforcements during the fighting for Nijmegen.

==== Wijchen ====
At 09:50 the 504th Parachute Infantry Regiment was going forward to Wijchen, to attack the Edithbridge from its south end. The bridge was secured. After this fierce engagement they pushed on to the traffic bridge south of Wijchen. Another fierce engagement followed and this bridge was secured.

==== Eindhoven–Veghel ====
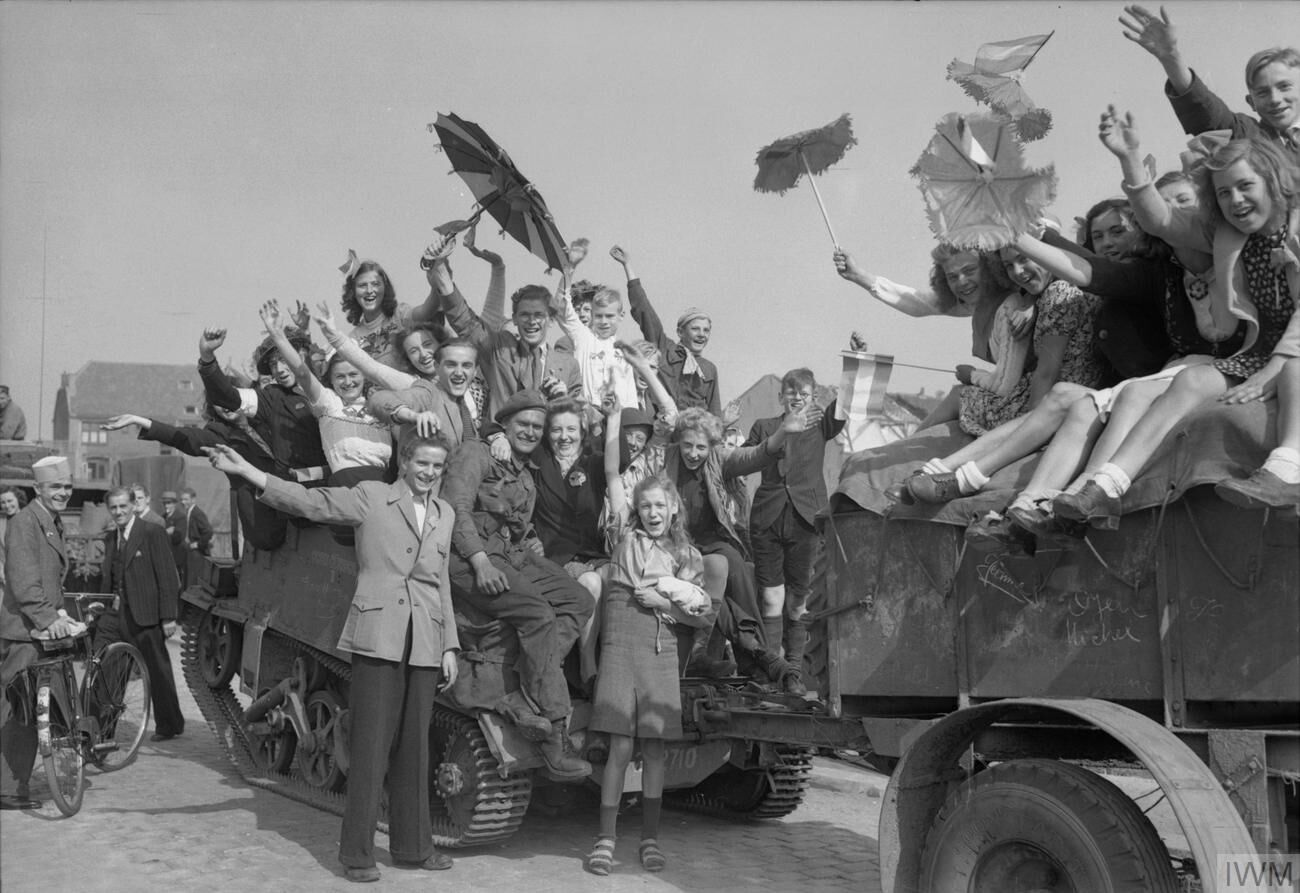
Dutch civilians celebrate the liberation of Eindhoven by Allied forces, 19 September 1944

To the south, the battle at Best continued to rage and sucked in the 101st's reserves. Cromwells of the 15th/19th Hussars arrived in the Eindhoven area at 10:00 and split up to provide tank support where needed. A squadron of Cromwells and two battalions of the 327th Glider Infantry Regiment reinforced the 502nd Parachute Infantry Regiment and defeated the Germans defending the Best bridge site and the Zonsche Forest, taking 1100-1400 prisoners and counting 300–600 German dead. To the southeast of Son, six Cromwells of the 15th/19th Hussars assisted the 506th Parachute Infantry Regiment against Panthers of the 107th Panzer Brigade. Six Panthers of a second group advanced towards the Son Bailey bridge from the east along the narrow canal towpath. They took the Americans by surprise and destroyed an ammunition truck crossing the bridge. The attack was beaten back by bazooka fire and a 57mm anti-tank gun from the recently landed Battery B, 81st Anti-Tank Battalion and the bridge was saved. The 44th Royal Tank Regiment moved forward from its assembly area this day and would arrive to assist the 101st the next morning.

On the night of 19/20 September, 78 German bombers took off to attack Eindhoven. The Allies had no anti-aircraft guns in the city, allowing the Germans to drop "a clear golden cluster of parachute flares" and bomb Eindhoven without loss. The city centre was shattered and the water pressure failed; over 200 houses were "gutted" and 9,000 buildings were damaged, with over 1,000 civilian casualties, including 227 dead. General Matthew Ridgway, in Eindhoven during the attack, wrote "Great fires were burning everywhere, ammo trucks were exploding, gasoline trucks were on fire, and debris from wrecked houses clogged the streets". Elements of the 101st, based in and around the city, witnessed the attack and escaped loss. The 506th Parachute Infantry Regiment rushed into the burning city and rescued civilians during the night. According to Rick Atkinson, this was "the only large, long-range air strike by German bombers during the fall of 1944".

=== Day 4: Wednesday 20 September ===
==== Arnhem bridge ====
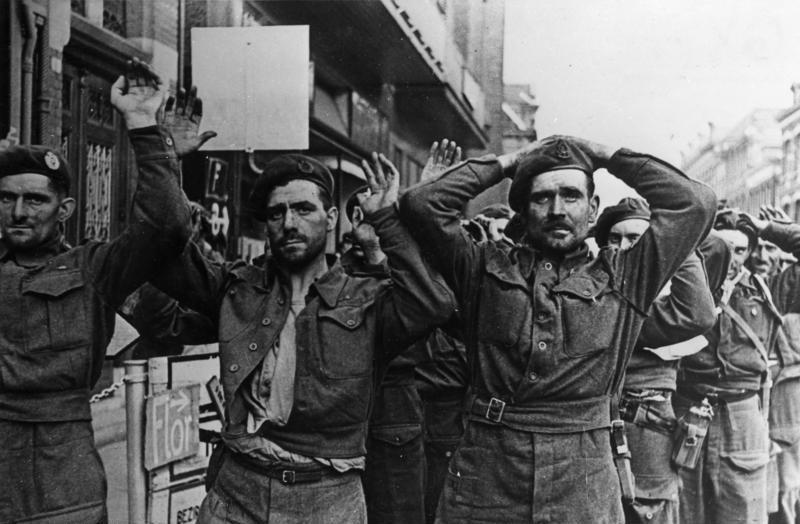
British POWs at Arnhem

Frost's force at the bridge continued to hold and established communication via the public telephone system with 1st Division around noon learning that the division had no hope of relieving them and that XXX Corps was stopped to the south in front of Nijmegen bridge. By the afternoon the British positions around the north end of Arnhem bridge had weakened considerably. Casualties, mostly wounded, were high from constant shelling. An acute lack of ammunition, especially anti-tank munitions, enabled enemy armor to demolish British positions from point-blank range. Food, water and medical supplies were scarce, and so many buildings were on fire and in such serious danger of collapse that a two-hour truce was arranged to evacuate the wounded (including Lieutenant-Colonel Frost) into German captivity. Frederick Gough took over as commander when Frost left. While leading a remnant group in withdrawal from the bridge, toward Oosterbeek, for a joining with the rest of the 1st Division, Major Hibbert was captured.

The Germans overcame pockets of resistance throughout the day, gaining control of the northern bridge approaches and permitting reinforcements to cross the span and reinforce units further south near Nijmegen. The remaining British troops continued to fight on, some with just fighting knives, but by early Thursday morning almost all had been taken prisoner. The last radio message broadcast from the bridge – "Out of ammo, God save the King" – was heard only by German radio intercept operators.

While it was estimated that the 1st Airborne Division, 10,000 strong, would only need to hold the Arnhem bridge for two days, 740 had held it for twice as long against far heavier opposition than anticipated. While 81 British soldiers died defending Arnhem bridge, German losses cannot be stated with any accuracy, though they were high; 11 units known to have participated in the fighting reported 50% casualties after the battle. In memory of the fighting there, the bridge has been renamed the "John Frost Bridge".

==== Oosterbeek ====
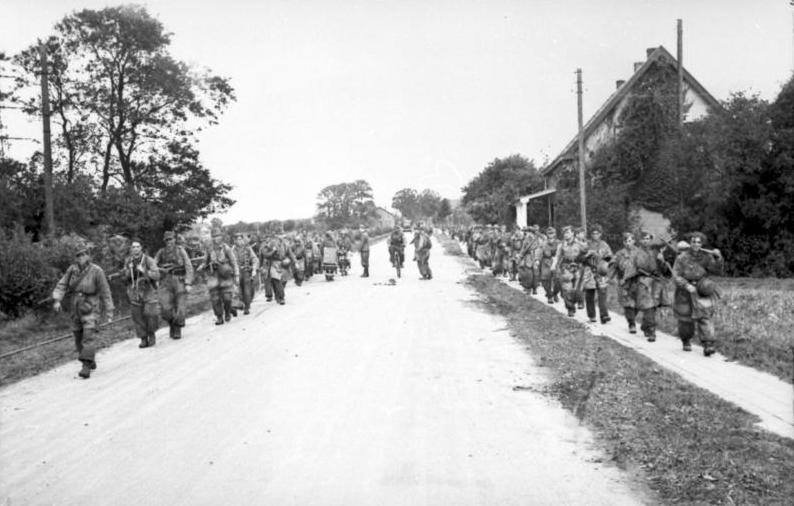
The Germans advance on Oosterbeek

Further west, the remnants of the 1st Airborne Division were gathering at Oosterbeek for their last stand; those already there were not seriously challenged by the enemy that day. To the east of the village, the 1st, 3rd and 11th Parachute Battalions and the 2nd South Staffordshires were organised into a defensive position. In desperate fighting later in the day, they repulsed an enemy attack which threatened to cut the division off from the Rhine and seal the fate of the bridgehead.

In the woods to the west of Oosterbeek the 4th Parachute Brigade fought its way towards the divisional perimeter but was attacked by German troops supported by artillery, mortars and tanks, (some mounting flame-throwers). The brigade had many casualties and the 10th Battalion reached Oosterbeek in the early afternoon with only 60 men.

In the rear, the 156th Parachute Battalion fought off numerous enemy attacks before counter-attacking; the Germans did not know they were fighting men who were in full retreat. The battalion, down to 150 men, mounted a bayonet charge to capture a hollow in the ground in the woods where they were pinned down by enemy attacks for the next eight hours. Towards the end of the day, 75 men fixed bayonets, broke through the German lines and retreated to the Allied pocket at Oosterbeek.

==== Nijmegen ====
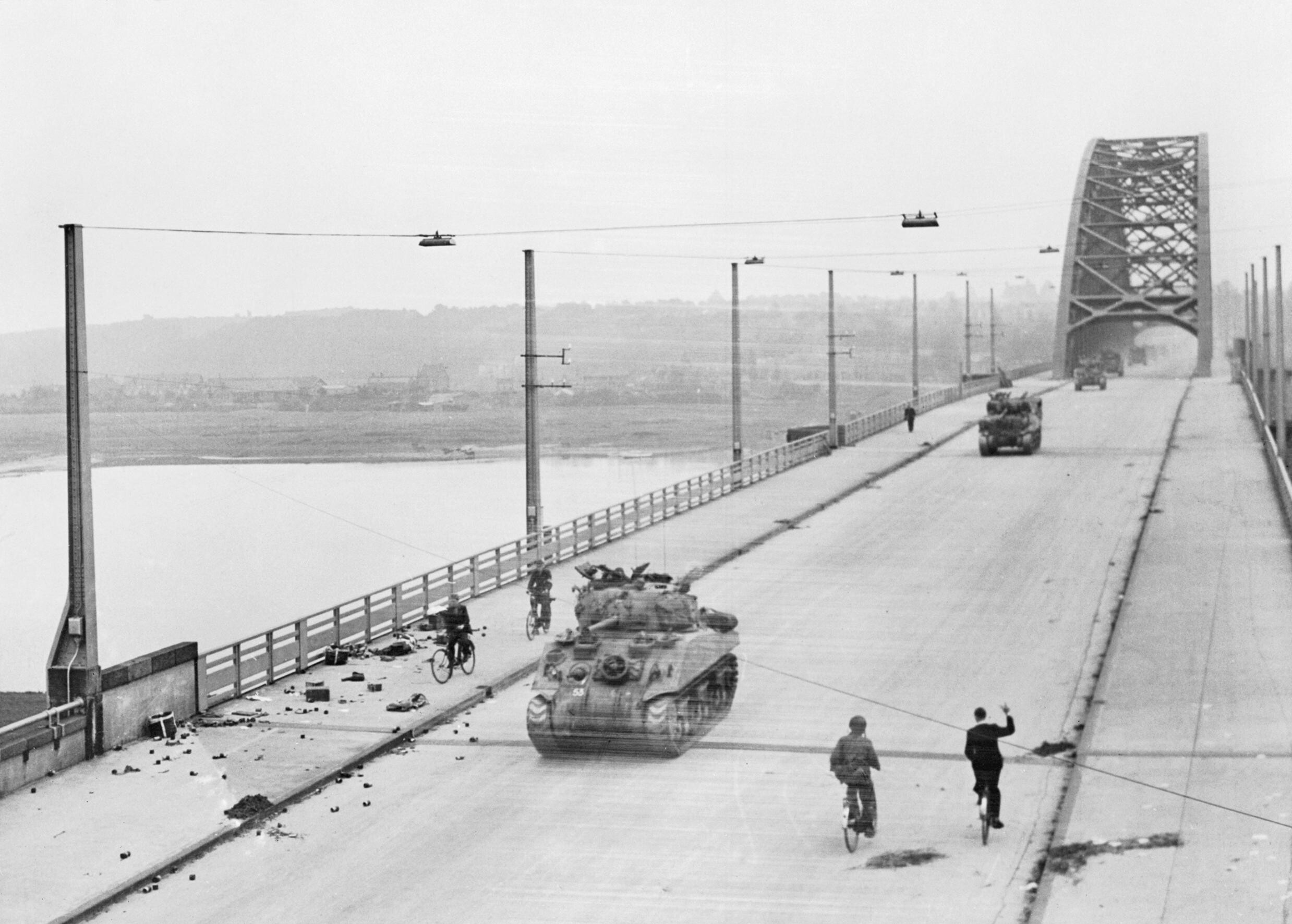
British tanks of XXX Corps cross the road bridge at Nijmegen.

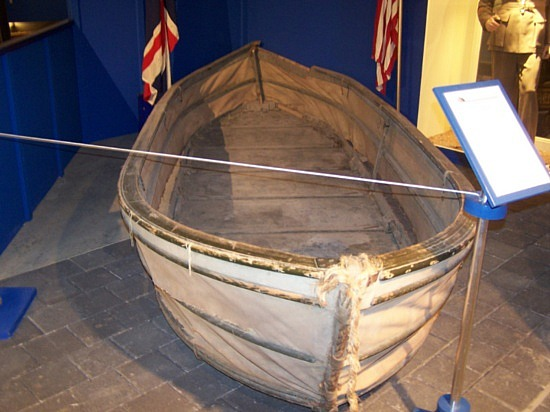
Canvas Goatley boat bridge engineers used as an assault boat.

The 82nd did not drop on both sides of the Nijmegen bridge: all troops were dropped on the south side of the Waal river. Hence the Americans had no means to seize the bridge, other than by a frontal river crossing from the south. The only boats available were canvas folding boats (normally used only by engineers) from the British XXX Corps stores. These boats, described at the time as "Bailey boats", did not arrive until the afternoon, and with time running short, a daylight assault crossing was ordered.

At about 15:00 (D+3), the 504th PIR began the river assault, when members of its 3rd Battalion – commanded by Major Julian Cook – were rowed across the Waal, by members of Company "C", 307th Engineer Battalion (C/307th) in 26 boats. A shortage of paddles required some troopers to paddle the craft with their rifle butts. Despite heavy fire from the German side, about half the boats survived the first crossing and 11 survived the first two crossings. Before the day was over, some boat "crews" from C/307th had crossed the Waal five times, while ferrying across two entire battalions from the 504th. (The costly attack was later nicknamed "Little Omaha" in reference to Omaha Beach. The paratroopers took 200 casualties, while German losses exceeded 267.) The paratroopers then proceeded through the village of Lent, toward the north end of the bridge. As German forces withdrew from the north end, tanks of the Grenadier Guards began to cross the bridge from the south, supported by elements of 505th PIR, at 19:30 (D+3). The Grenadier Guards' tanks linked up with the 504th PIR 1 km (0.62 mi) north of the bridge, in Lent.

The tanks of 2nd Irish Guards had provided fire support from south of the river. The infantry of 3rd Irish Guards was in reserve under the temporary command of Denis FitzGerald. The commander, Joe Vandeleur, had a severely upset stomach from "too many raw apples and champagne" and spent the entire battle sleeping on the kitchen floor of his HQ.

A perception that subsequent advances by XXX Corps were unreasonably slow has remained controversial. Frost and Hibbert's forces controlled the Arnhem bridge, 7 miles (11 km) away for about another two-and-a-half hours (until about 22:00 that night) and some British resistance in that area continued until the early hours of the following morning. However, it was already dark when the Nijmegen bridge was captured, the overall situation was chaotic, and the depth of German opposition to the north was unknown, to the Allies, and even to German officers on the ground. For instance, the 10th SS Panzer Division commander, Heinz Harmel, when interviewed several decades later by Robert Kershaw (a former British Army officer), stated: "The four panzers (Carrington's Grenadier tank troop) who crossed the bridge made a mistake when they stayed in the village of Lent. If they had carried on their advance, it would have been all over for us." Harmel's artillery map, preserved from the time of the battle, suggested that German troops between Nijmegen and Arnhem were extremely thin: there were a handful of security pickets with rifles at the Betuwe midpoint, in Elst. In fact, however, Harmel was evidently unaware that three Tiger tanks, one heavy gun and two companies of infantry had already been heading south from Arnhem towards Lent, when the Grenadier Guards' tanks crossed the Nijmegen bridge.

Sgt Peter Robinson, Guards Armoured Division, whose tank led the advance over the Nijmegen road bridge, stated:

We reached the far end of the bridge and immediately there was a [German] roadblock. So the troop sergeant covered me through and then I got to the other side and covered the rest of the troop through. We were still being engaged; there was a gun in front of the church three or four hundred yards in front of us. We knocked him out. We got down the road to the railway bridge; we cruised round there very steady. We were being engaged all the time.

Initially, four tanks crossed the bridge with a high probability some of the German explosive charges for demolition would activate. British engineers had cut some charges on the south of the bridge. As the tanks moved over the bridge they were fired on by single-shot, disposable anti-tank Panzerfausts, and had grenades dropped on them by German troops in the bridge girders – 180 German bodies were recovered from the girders with some unaccounted falling into the river below. Once across the bridge only a few 82nd troops met the first tanks as they crossed the bridge. After crossing the bridge one tank was destroyed and another badly damaged, yet moving, and was driven to the village of Lent on the north side of the bridge by the only survivor of the attack – a Sgt Knight – who had survived by feigning to be dead. The rest of the crews were killed, injured, or taken prisoner. One tank destroyed a German Sturmgeschütz assault gun lying in wait. The Guards tanks met the bulk of the 82nd troops north of the bridge in the village of Lent, 1 km (0.62 mi) north of the bridge and in darkness, after clearing out SS troops from the village and setting the church ablaze. It was dark by the time (19:30) the Grenadier Guards tanks linked up with the 504th PIR, north of the Nijmegen bridge. Moreover, on the road out of Lent, on the northern side of the railway bridge, the leading tank met two hidden German anti-tank guns in darkness. Even if the guns were located and destroyed, German troops with Panzerfausts were on the road and four available Guards tanks were low on ammunition. Only one of the four available tanks was a Firefly, mounting a gun capable of destroying a Tiger tank from the front. Three Tiger tanks were heading south to Lent, unbeknownst to the Guards tank crews. Unable to locate the anti-tank guns, the tanks stopped.

In addition, German forces were still threatening to retake the north end of the bridge. Many of the Guards tanks were still assisting the 82nd and XXX Corps infantry in Nijmegen. The Guards who were over the bridge could not leave the northern end of the bridge for fear of recapture. At Lent only five tanks were available, including the damaged tank, which now reportedly had a joint UK-US crew: it included members of the 82nd who had prior experience with Sherman tanks. Carrington's tank was stationary, alone, at the northern end of the bridge for 45 minutes, awaiting infantry who were fighting German snipers in the girders as they moved across the bridge. In the meantime, Carrington was attacked by Germans with a Panzerfaust. After clearing the bridge of snipers, the Grenadier Guards crossed the bridge and formed a defence line. The line was reinforced with 82nd troops.

To the east, German attacks on the Groesbeek Heights made significant progress. A counterattack at Mook by elements of the 505th PIR and 1st Battalion, the Coldstream Guards of XXX Corps forced the Germans back to their line of departure by 20:00. The 508th PIR lost ground at Im Thal and Legewald, when attacked by German infantry and tanks. To the south, running battles between the 101st and various German units continued. Eventually several tanks and self-propelled guns managed to cut the roads but pulled back when low on ammunition.

=== Day 5: Thursday 21 September ===
==== Oosterbeek ====
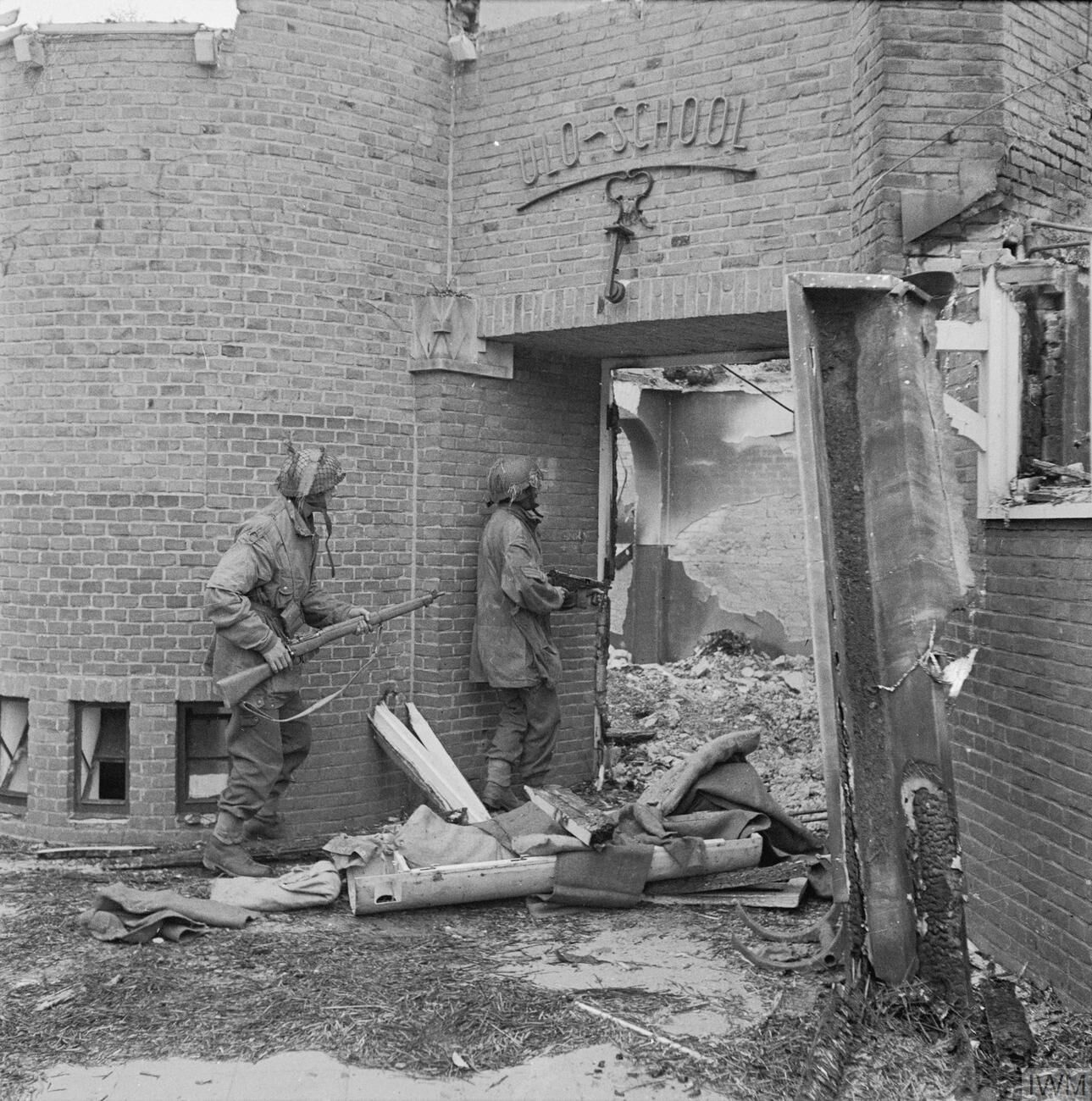
A Dutch school damaged by mortar fire, being searched for German snipers by Sergeant J. Whawell and Sergeant J. Turrell of the Glider Pilot Regiment. An empty CLE Canister lies open on the ground in the doorway of the school. 20 September 1944

Approximately 3,584 survivors of the 1st Airborne Division established themselves in the buildings and woods around Oosterbeek with the intention of holding a bridgehead on the north side of the Rhine until XXX Corps could arrive. Throughout the day their position was heavily attacked on all sides. In the southeast, Lonsdale Force (the remnants of the 1st, 3rd, and 11th Parachute Battalions and 2nd South Staffordshires) repulsed a big attack aided by the fire of the divisional light artillery. In the north the 7th King's Own Scottish Borderers were almost overrun during the afternoon but a counterattack with bayonets restored the situation and the heavily depleted battalion moved further south to occupy a narrower front. The most serious attack of the day was made at dawn against "B" Company, 1st Battalion, Border Regiment which controlled a vital area of high ground in the southwestern tip of the perimeter overlooking the Heveadorp ferry crossing at Driel, which was the division's only straightforward means of receiving reinforcements from the south. The company was attacked by enemy infantry and armour, including captured French tanks equipped with flamethrowers, and the heights were lost. Counterattacks failed and the remnants of the company were redeployed. The division was left in a precarious position, controlling just 700 metres (770 yards) of the riverbank. The division held ground to similar attacks elsewhere on their front.

A supply attempt by RAF Stirlings of 38 Group was disrupted by the only Luftwaffe fighter interception during the operation. Fw 190s intercepted the Stirlings at low altitude and shot down 15 of them. Anti-aircraft fire accounted for 8 further losses. The Fw 190s were able to penetrate the screen of Allied fighters sent to cover the drop when the U.S. 56th Fighter Group was late in arriving in its patrol sector between Lochem and Deventer. The 56th redeemed itself to an extent by shooting down 15 of the 22 Fw 190s as they departed.

==== Remainder of Polish paratroopers enter the battle ====
After two days of delay due to the weather, the remainder of the Polish 1st Independent Parachute Brigade under Major-General Stanislaw Sosabowski entered the battle on the afternoon of 21 September, delivered at about 17:15 by 114 C-47s of the U.S. 61st and 314th Troop Carrier Groups. Two of the brigade's three battalions were dropped amidst heavy German fire, opposite the 1st Airborne Division's position on a new drop zone south of the Rhine near the village of Driel. The remaining battalion was recalled due to the weather and dropped two days later and 22 km (14 mi) away near Grave to avoid the flak. 1003 men had arrived and casualties during the drop and later that day amounted to five killed and 25 wounded.

Intending to use the Heveadorp ferry to reinforce the division, they discovered that the opposite bank was dominated by the enemy and that the ferry was missing; it was later found downstream past the road bridge, completely unserviceable. Unable to help the British, the Polish withdrew to Driel for the night and organised defence there, with the Rhine behind their backs and German units increasing in strength around them. Several attempts to cross the Rhine on improvised equipment were only partly successful due to heavy German fire and an inability by the 1st Airborne to secure the landing area on the Rhine's northern bank. The 1st Airborne Division made radio contact during the day with guns of the 64th Medium Regiment of XXX Corps' artillery, which had advanced with the ground forces and were assigned to the division for support. Unlike many others, this radio link worked throughout the battle and the regiment provided valuable fire support to the division.

==== Nijmegen ====
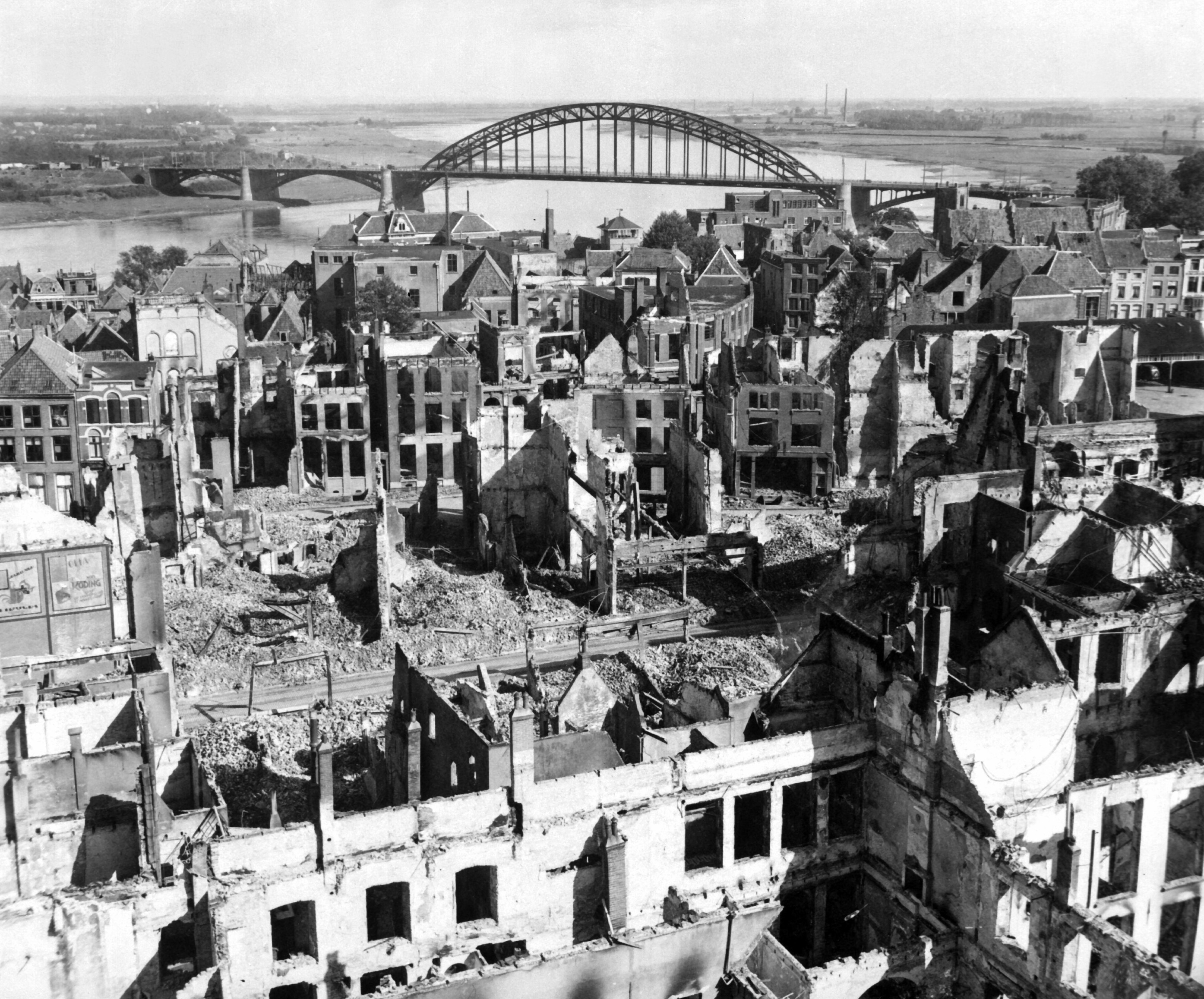
Nijmegen after the battle. 28 September 1944.

Despite the capture of Nijmegen bridge and the clearing of the town on the previous evening, the five tanks of Guards Armoured Division which were across the river did not advance due to: darkness, one tank having been hit, meeting hidden German anti-tank guns, not knowing the full situation on the road ahead and having to secure the northern end of the bridge until infantry were fully in place. Unbeknownst to the leading tank crews, three Tiger tanks and two companies of infantry were heading down the road south from Arnhem to Lent. The Division resumed its advance about 18 hours later, at noon in daylight with reinforcements from Nijmegen.

Horrocks claimed he needed to hold his force, as his troops were still fighting in Nijmegen and supplies were slow to come up the single road from Belgium. The Coldstream Guards Group were repulsing an attack on the Groesbeek position, the Irish Guards Group had moved back south to Eindhoven to meet another attack, the Grenadiers had just captured the approaches to the bridge with assistance from the 82nd Airborne paratroops. They had five tanks deployed to support the securing of the north end of the bridge, and the Welsh Guards were in reserve for the 82nd Airborne. The Guards Armoured Division was scattered over 25 square miles of the south bank of the Waal. Horrocks stated, "Jim Gavin, the divisional commander, could have had no idea of the utter confusion that reigned in Nijmegen at the time, with sporadic battles going on all over the place, and particularly on our one road to the rear where chaos reigned".

The Market Garden plan depended upon a single highway as the route of advance and supply. This caused a delay, though it was not significant. A problem was that other units could not be deployed on other routes to maintain momentum. Brigadier General Gavin opined that this would not have been an issue with firm leadership, although he failed to discuss his own failings in maintaining the set schedule. The historian Max Hastings argued that the delays in moving towards Arnhem "reflected poorly on the British Army". Carrington stated that he met no one who "suggested we should press on to Arnhem." The historian Robin Neillands argued that the failure of Gavin's 82nd Airborne to take the Nijmegen bridge on 17 September, was a "major contribution to the failure of the entire Arnhem operation and it will not do to pass the blame for that failure on to the British or to Captain Lord Carrington."

The delay enabled the Germans to reinforce the defence already established at Ressen (an SS infantry battalion, eleven tanks, an infantry battalion, two 88 mm batteries, twenty 20 mm flak and the remnants of the forces fighting at Arnhem), aided by use of the bridge following their capture of its northern end. The advance of the Guards, hindered by marshes that prevented off-road movement, was soon halted by a firm German defensive line. The Guards' spearhead did not have the strength to outflank the line. The 43rd Division was ordered to take over the lead, work its way around the enemy positions and make contact with the Polish airborne troops at Driel to the west. The 43rd was 16 km (9.9 mi) away, and there was a traffic jam between them and Nijmegen. It was not until the following day, Friday, that the whole Division crossed the River Waal and began its advance.

The Germans, clearly starting to gain the upper hand at Arnhem, continued counterattacking all along the path of XXX Corps. However, XXX Corps still managed to advance with the 101st Airborne Division. Glider tugs and cargo carriers maintained supply lines for the 82nd Airborne Division. About 60% of the supplies were recovered, with 351 gliders counted as effective, partly with help from Dutch civilians. Most of the 82nd and 101st, reinforced by British armoured units, were engaged in defensive fighting to hold the highway corridor. Small engagements were fought along the whole length of the corridor.

=== Day 6: Friday 22 September ("Black Friday") ===
==== Oosterbeek ====
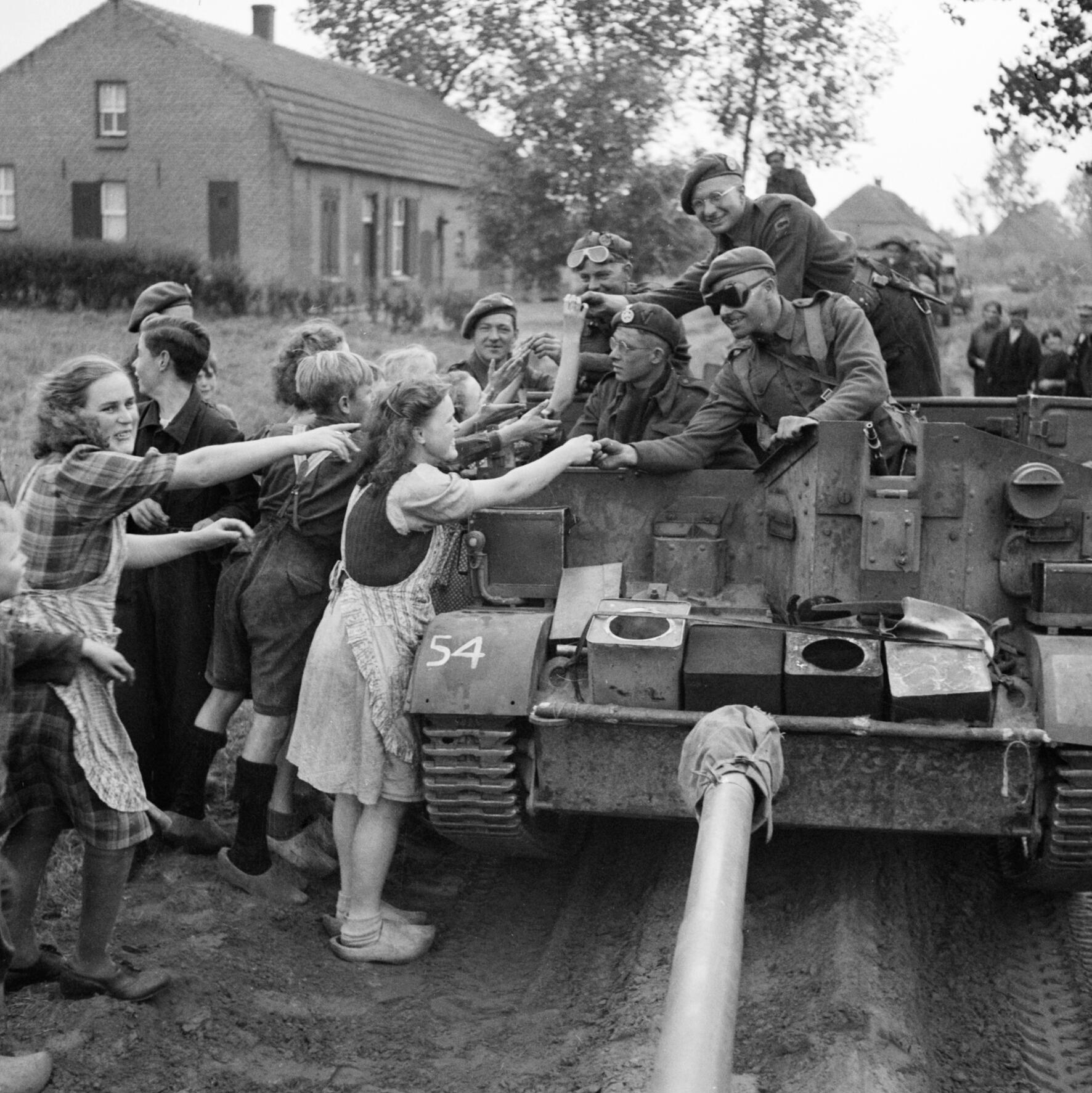
British soldiers of the 8th Rifle Brigade, 11th Armoured Division, distribute chocolate to Dutch civilians in Heeze, Netherlands, 22 September 1944

The Germans, wary after unsuccessful and costly attacks the previous day, shelled and mortared the airborne positions heavily. By the end of the battle some 110 guns had been brought to Oosterbeek as the Germans shifted to the tactics that had worked so well at Arnhem bridge. Attacks were limited, conducted against specific positions and even individual houses. Numerous well-sited British anti-tank guns also caused German reluctance to attack. The survivors of the 1st Airborne were outnumbered 4 to 1. The Polish 1st Parachute Brigade at Driel, unable to cross the Rhine, nonetheless forced a redeployment of German forces. Fearing a Polish attempt to recapture Arnhem bridge or, worse, an attempt to cut the road to the south and so trap the 10th SS Panzer Division then blocking the route of the Guards Armoured Division to Arnhem, the Germans withdrew 2,461 troops from Oosterbeek. They were moved south of the river to engage the Polish paratroopers at Driel, making attacks to little effect through the day.

==== Link-up between the Poles and XXX Corps ====
The British 43rd Wessex Division had moved up in order to relieve the Guards Armoured Division. At first light the 2nd Household Cavalry Regiment was sent to establish contact with the Poles via a left hook on minor roads. They sneaked past the Germans at Oosterhout in the fog and then proceeded through Valburg to Driel. The 7th Somerset Light Infantry of the 214th Brigade followed, attacking Oosterhout as the fog lifted and taking it from elements of Kampfgruppe Knaust and Panzer-Kompanie "Mielke" by 17:00.

Once Oosterhout was cleared, the 5th Duke of Cornwall's Light Infantry passed through and drove towards Driel. Whilst passing the outskirts of Elst at the De Hoop crossroads, the Cornwalls came across a column of tanks of schwere Panzer-Kompanie "Hummel". The Cornwalls set up an ambush and succeeded in knocking out five tanks (3 Tigers and 2 Panthers) in a combined use of mines and PIATs. They arrived in Driel during the evening.

Lacking assault craft, an unsuccessful attempt was made that night to put elements of the Polish brigade across the river. British and Polish engineers on both sides of the Rhine had worked through the day to improvise a crossing using small boats linked by signals cable but the cable kept breaking forcing the Polish troops to slowly row across against the strong current. The attempt was made under enemy observation and fire and only 52 soldiers of the 8th Polish Parachute Company survived the crossing before a halt was called at dawn.

==== Eindhoven–Veghel ====
While much of the corridor was firmly in Allied hands, German counterattacks were still being mounted along its length. Early on 22 September the Germans attacked towards Veghel in an uncoordinated pincer movement to cut Highway 69. Kampfgruppe Huber of 59th Infantry Division attacked from the west, supported by four Jagdpanthers from 1st Company 559th Panzerjäger Battalion. It briefly cut the highway south of Veghel but was cut off and decimated by 1st Battalion 506th Parachute Infantry Regiment, 1st and 2nd Battalions 327th Glider Infantry Regiment, 1st and 3rd Battalions 501st Parachute Infantry Regiment, and B and C Squadrons 44th Royal Tank Regiment.

Attacking from the east was Kampfgruppe Walther, comprising 107th Panzer Brigade, 16th Battalion Division No. 180, and SS Kampfgruppe Richter. Between Veghel and Uden, the Germans clashed with 2nd Battalion 501st Parachute Infantry Regiment, 2nd Battalion 506th Parachute Infantry Regiment, 3rd Battalion 327th Glider Infantry Regiment, and the British 100th Anti-Aircraft Brigade, which had been held up in Veghel due to traffic. The Germans took heavy losses and could not enter Veghel to destroy the bridge, but remained close enough to halt traffic on the highway. Horrocks sent 32nd Guards Brigade south from Nijmegen to Uden to assist with reopening the highway the next day.

=== Day 7: Saturday 23 September ===
The Germans had figured out what the Poles were attempting to do and they spent the rest of the day trying to cut off the British in their northern bridgehead from the riverside. The British managed to hold on and both sides suffered heavy losses. The Germans also attacked the Poles on the south side in order to tie them down but several tanks arrived from XXX Corps and the German attack was defeated. Boats and engineers from the Canadian army also arrived that day and another river crossing that night landed 150 troops of the Polish 3rd Parachute Battalion on the north bank of the Rhine.

To the south several more German attacks from their position astride the road were stopped but the road was still cut. XXX Corps then sent a unit of the Guards Armoured Division 19 km (12 mi) south and re-took the road. The rest of the force to the north continued to wait for infantry to move up, still only a few kilometres south of Arnhem.

The 325th GIR was finally delivered to reinforce the 82nd Airborne, originally planned for 19 September, and while it was immediately 75% effective, arrived far too late to affect the battle in that sector.

=== Day 8: Sunday 24 September ===
Another German force cut the road to the south of Veghel and set up defensive positions for the night. It was not clear to the Allies at this point how much of a danger this represented but the principal objective of Operation Market Garden, i.e. the Allied crossing of the Rhine, was abandoned this day and the decision made to go over to the defensive with a new front line in Nijmegen. Nonetheless, an attempt was made on Sunday night to reinforce the 1st Airborne Division with the 4th Battalion, The Dorsetshire Regiment. Two companies were put across the river but the location of the crossing point was ill-advised and the Dorsets landed among German positions. Fragmented by their landing and immediately pinned down, of the 315 men who crossed only 75 reached Oosterbeek; the remainder were taken prisoner. As a result of this failure, it was decided to withdraw the 1st Airborne Division from its bridgehead on the northern side of the Rhine.

=== Day 9: Monday 25 September ===
At dawn the 1st Airborne Division received their orders to withdraw across the Rhine; this was called Operation Berlin. This could not be done until nightfall and in the meantime the division struggled to survive. In a departure from their cautious attritional tactics of the previous days, the Germans formed two potent SS battlegroups and made a significant thrust along a narrow front in the eastern sector. This succeeded in breaking through the thin front line and for a time the division was in peril. The attack met with increasing resistance as it pushed deeper into the British lines and was finally broken up by a heavy bombardment of the 64th Medium Regiment.

Employing every ruse to give the Germans the impression that their positions were unchanged, the 1st Airborne Division began its withdrawal at 22:00. British and Canadian engineer units ferried the troops across the Rhine, covered by the Polish 3rd Parachute Battalion on the north bank. By early the next morning they had withdrawn 2,398 survivors, leaving 300 men to surrender on the north bank at first light, when German fire prevented their rescue. Of approximately 10,600 men of the 1st Airborne Division and other units who fought north of the Rhine, 1,485 had died and 6,414 were taken prisoner of whom one third were wounded.

To the south the newly arrived 50th (Northumbrian) Infantry Division attacked the Germans holding the highway and secured it by the next day. The German bridgehead on the island by this time initially encompassed the villages of Elden, Elst, Huissen and Bemmel – the latter considered the most important. Elst however was lost on 25 September after several days of bitter street fighting with troops from the 43rd Wessex. Meanwhile, the village of Bemmel was captured by the 5th East Yorkshire Regiment on the same day.

=== Further fighting, 26–28 September ===
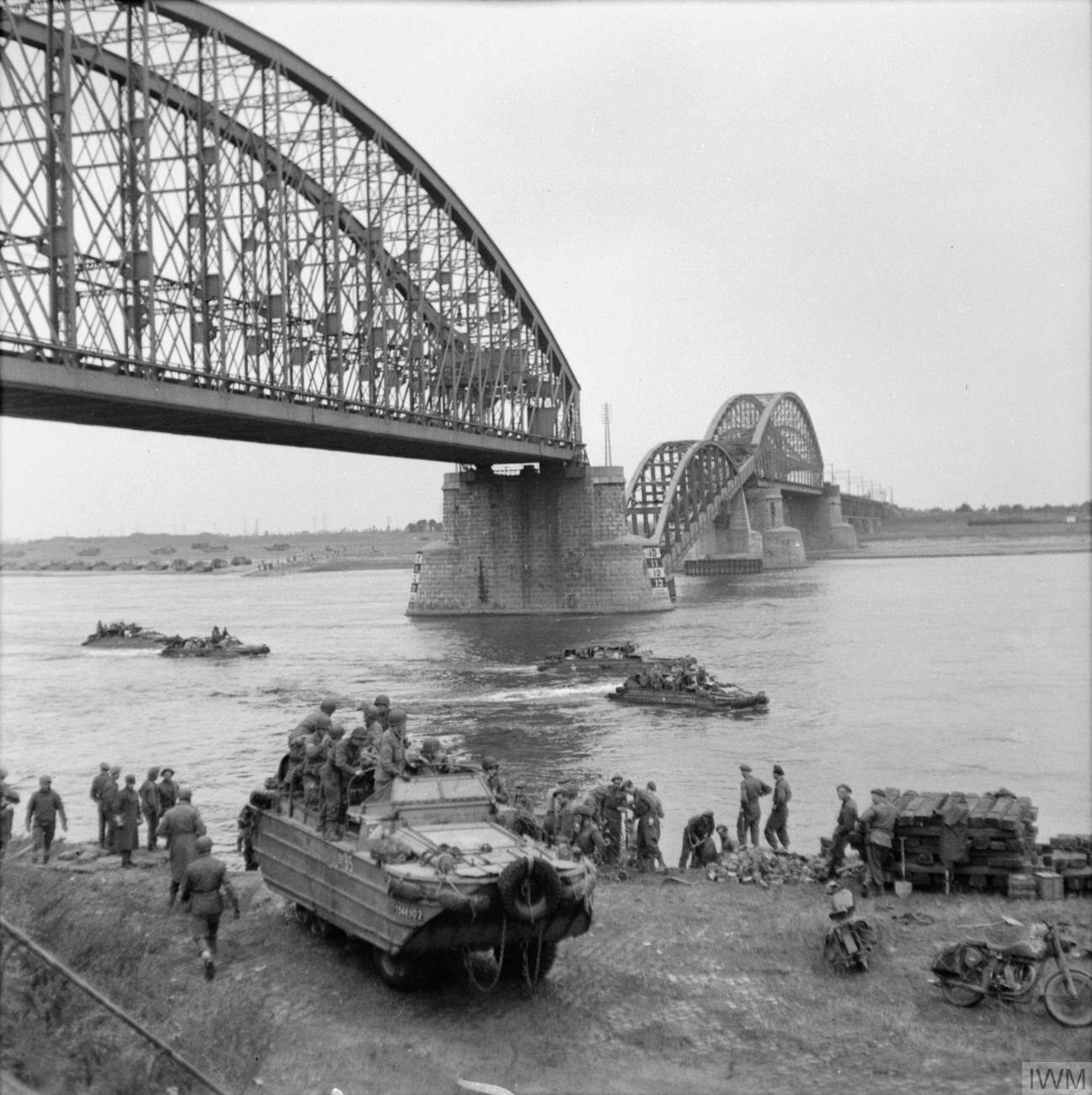
DUKWs transport supplies across the River Waal at Nijmegen, below the railway bridge whose central span was broken by German frogmen using floating mines, 28 September 1944

On 26 September the Germans then crossed the Rhine in battalion strength and managed to gain a small bridgehead at Randwijk. This was only lightly held by 43rd Wessex Reconnaissance troops but on seeing the Germans were soon reinforced by the Hampshires and Somersets with additional support from tanks of the 8th Armoured brigade. Their intention was to take out the dyke road near Randwijk which was used by the Germans to ferry the crossings. Despite the interference from the Luftwaffe, the British were able to force the Germans out after a final gun battle in the village church – the Hampshires took 150 POWs. The German bridgehead south of the Nederrijn was effectively destroyed. The following two days saw the 6th and 7th Green Howards attempt to take Baal and Haalderen, two villages both to the northeast and east of Bemmel respectively. This however was a failure. To the south of Haalderen, on the bank of the Waal River, lay a number of brickworks where the tall chimneys were used as German observation points, from where artillery fire could be directed.

From 28 September onwards, the II Fallschirmjäger Korps launched a series of assaults from the Klever Reichswald against the Allied positions east of Nijmegen. These attacks were in preparation for a much larger counter-attack planned by Bittrich. Delays in the preparations of 2nd SS Panzer Korps however meant these were repelled as they weren't properly supported by the XII SS Korps, even though they carried out some local diversionary attacks across the Nederrijn towards Doorwerth and Wageningen – these too being repulsed.

Hitler ordered the Nijmegen bridges to be destroyed, in the hope that supplies and reinforcements to the Allies would be hampered, and to enable a German counterattack to retake the bridgehead. Various attempts at destroying both bridges proved a costly failure, particularly to the Luftwaffe, who launched many sorties – in one day forty-six fighters were lost to the RAF and anti-aircraft fire. Nevertheless, an attempt by three groups of four German Marine Einsatzkommandos (frogmen) set off from 10 km (6.2 mi) upstream from the Nijmegen bridges to place explosives under them. The frogmen then used the river current in an attempt to return to their lines. The operation was a partial success − the railway bridge was blown up, a span managed to break away from a section and fell into the river, making it totally unusable, but the road bridge was only slightly damaged because the mine had been badly placed. Of the twelve men, three were killed, seven were captured, and two managed to return to their lines. The bridges however were repaired albeit temporarily – Royal Engineers were able to span a prefabricated Bailey bridge both over the railway bridge and the damaged section of the road bridge.

== Casualties ==
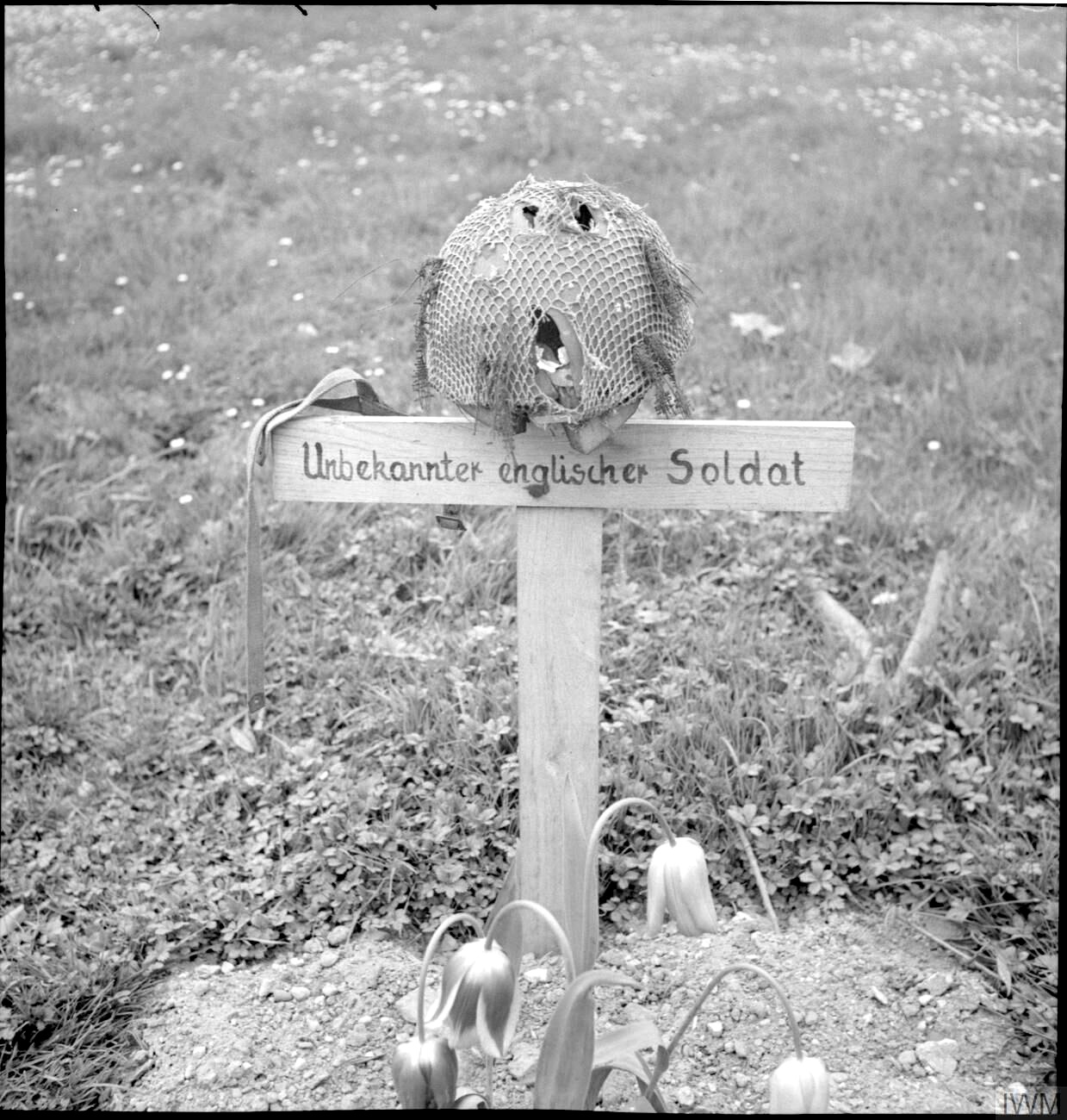
The grave of an unknown British soldier at Arnhem, photographed after its liberation 15 April 1945.

XXX Corps suffered fewer than 1,500 casualties, which stands in stark contrast to the 8,000 casualties suffered by the 1st Airborne Division. On several occasions, units of the flanking British Corps made contact with paratroopers before units of XXX Corps, and fought on to support them until the end of the operation. The higher toll by the 101st Airborne Division reflects the reality that in addition to contending with the local German defenders, they also had to combat German troops retreating from the XXX Corps advance.

Casualties	Total	Grand Total
Dutch civilians	500 (Note: Ryan claims civilian casualties in the Arnhem area are less than 500, while he had heard of up to 10,000 killed, wounded or displaced civilians in the Market Garden operation area.)	500
Second Army and I Airborne Corps	11,784–13,226 (Note: According to Ellis Second Army casualties (excluding the 1st Airborne Division) amounted to 3,716 men from 17–26 September. Ryan states that total British casualties amounted to 13,226: 1st Airborne Division (including Polish forces and glider pilots), 7,578; RAF pilot and crew losses, 294; XXX Corps, 1,480, while supporting operations by VIII and XII Corps resulted in 3,874 casualties. VIII Corps staff place their losses at 663 men. Michael Reynolds arrives at a slightly different figure to Ryan for the airborne losses; 1,446 men of the 1st Airborne and Glider Pilot Regiment were killed while 6,414 were taken prisoner. Furthermore 97 Poles were killed and a further 111 captured.)	15,326–17,200
XVIII Airborne Corps	3,542– 3,974 (Note: 82nd Airborne Division: 1,432. 101st Airborne Division: 2,118. Glider pilots and air crew: 424.)	15,326–17,200

German casualties are harder to determine, due to incomplete records. Rundstedt provided an official figure of 3,300, but this has been challenged by historians. Conservative estimates range from 6,400 to 8,000 killed and wounded. Kershaw listed the German order of battle, with between 6,315 and 8,925 casualties. In A Bridge Too Far, Cornelius Ryan estimated 7,500 to 10,000 additional casualties to those provided by Rundstedt, for a final total of 10,800–13,300 losses. A contemporary paper by the 21st Army Group claimed that 16,000 German prisoners were taken during the course of Operation Market Garden. The report also claimed the destruction of 159 German aircraft, and 30 tanks or self-propelled guns during the operation. (Note: Historian Cornelius Ryan wrote that "complete German losses remain unknown but that in Arnhem and Oosterbeek admitted casualties came to 3,300 including 1,300 dead" and "I would conservatively estimate that Army Group B lost at least another 7,500–10,000 men of which perhaps a quarter were killed." Michael Reynolds wrote that "precise details of German casualties do not exist", and they totaled about 6,400 based on research by Robert Kershaw. Kershaw estimated that 2,565 Germans were killed north of the lower Rhine and a further 3,750 were lost fighting around XXX Corps corridor. Stephen Badsey wrote that "other calculations place [German losses] at 2,000 dead and 6,000 wounded".)

== Honours ==
=== Victoria Cross ===
Five Victoria Crosses were awarded during Operation Market Garden. On 19 September, RAF Douglas Dakota Mk. III, KG374, c/n 12383, (ex-USAAF C-47A-DK, 42-92568), 'YS-DM', of 271 Squadron, RAF Down Ampney, Gloucester, piloted by F/Lt. David Lord, was hit by anti-aircraft fire in the starboard engine while on a supply sortie to Arnhem. Fire spread over the starboard wing, as Lord spent ten minutes making two passes over very small drop zones (which, unknown to the crew, had been overrun by German forces) to drop eight ammunition panniers. Just after the last pannier was dropped, the fuel tank exploded and tore off the wing, and only the navigator F/O Harry King escaped. He was made a POW the following morning, spending the rest of the war in Stalag Luft I at Barth, Germany. Lord, the second pilot P/O R. E. H. "Dickie" Medhurst (son of Air Chief Marshal Sir Charles Medhurst), the wireless operator F/O Alec Ballantyne, and air dispatchers Cpl. P. Nixon, Dvr. A. Rowbotham, Dvr. J. Ricketts, and Dvr. L. Harper of 223 Company RASC, were killed. Following the release of King from prison camp, full details of the action became known and Lord received a posthumous Victoria Cross (VC) on 13 November 1945, the only VC awarded to any member of Transport Command during the Second World War. In May 1949, the Dutch Government awarded Harry King the Netherlands Bronze Cross.

From 17 to 20 September, John Hollington Grayburn of the 2nd Parachute Battalion "led his men with supreme gallantry and determination. Although in pain and weakened by his wounds, short of food and without sleep, his courage never flagged. There is no doubt that, had it not been for this officer's inspiring leadership and personal bravery, the Arnhem bridge could never have been held for this time." John Grayburn's posthumous award of the Victoria Cross was accompanied by his posthumous promotion to captain.

Also on 19 September, Captain Lionel Queripel of the 10th Parachute Battalion, though injured in the face and both arms, personally remained as a solitary rear guard after ordering his men to withdraw, over their protests. He was awarded a posthumous Victoria Cross.

On 20 September, Lance Sergeant John Baskeyfield's "superb gallantry [was] beyond praise. During the remaining days at Arnhem stories of his valour were a constant inspiration to all ranks. He spurned danger, ignored pain and, by his supreme fighting spirit, infected all who witnessed his conduct with the same aggressiveness and dogged devotion to duty which characterised his actions throughout." Sergeant Baskeyfield, a member of the 2nd Battalion, South Staffordshire Regiment, posthumously received his Victoria Cross.

On 25 September, Major Robert Henry Cain, also of the 2nd Battalion, South Staffordshire Regiment, "showed superb gallantry. His powers of endurance and leadership were the admiration of all his fellow officers and stories of his valour were being constantly exchanged amongst the troops. His coolness and courage under incessant fire could not be surpassed." Major Cain was the only Victoria Cross recipient to survive the battle.

=== Medal of Honor ===
Two American soldiers were awarded the Medal of Honor, both posthumously, for their actions during Market Garden. On 19 September, Private First Class Joe E. Mann of the 101st Airborne Division, under attack and injured in both arms, "which were bandaged to his body... yelled "grenade" and threw his body over the grenade, and as it exploded, he died."

On 21 September, Private John R. Towle of the 82nd Airborne Division, under attack and "motivated only by his high conception of duty ... rushed approximately 125 yards through grazing enemy fire to an exposed position from which he could engage [an] enemy half-track with his rocket launcher. While in a kneeling position preparatory to firing on the enemy vehicle, Pvt. Towle was mortally wounded by a mortar shell. By his heroic tenacity, at the price of his life, Pvt. Towle saved the lives of many of his comrades and was directly instrumental in breaking up the enemy counterattack."

=== Military Order of William ===
For gallantry during Operation Market Garden, two units received the highest Dutch military award, the Military Order of William. On 8 October 1945, the US 82nd Airborne Division was awarded the Knights 4th class honour by HM Queen Wilhelmina. The division was also allowed to add "Nijmegen 1944" to her battle honors.

On 31 May 2006, HM Queen Beatrix awarded the Knights 4th class honour to the Polish 1st Independent Parachute Brigade.

== Aftermath ==
=== German counter-attack ===
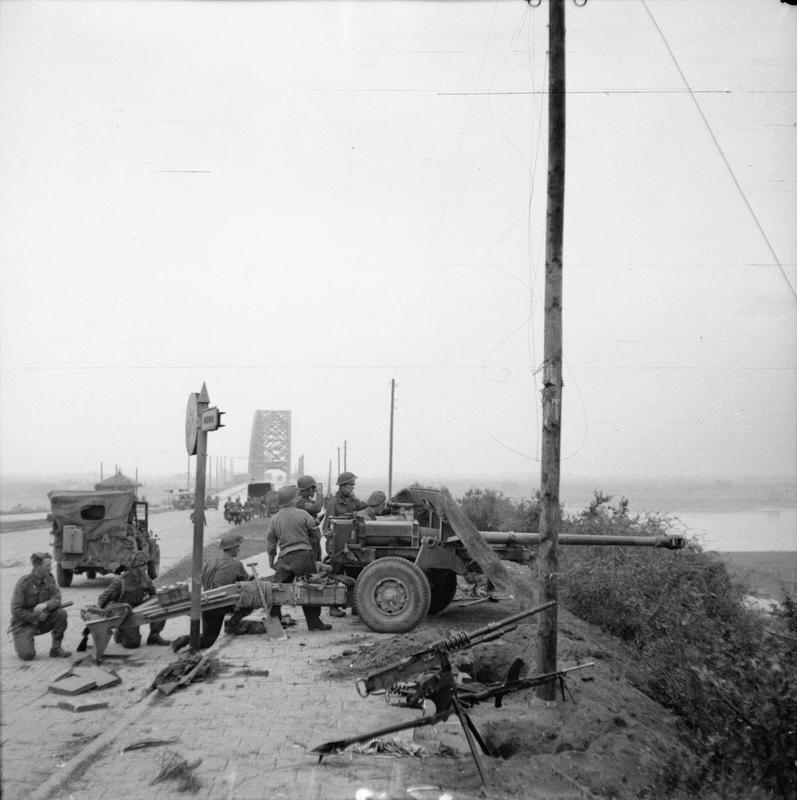
A British 17-pounder anti tank gun protects the road embankment south of the Nijmegen road bridge – the Allies managed to repel the German counteroffensive from 30 September to 8 October

Model attempted to regain the Nijmegen bridgehead in an effort to contain the Allied offensive and drive them off the Betuwe, also known as 'the Island.' Bittrich led II SS Panzer Korps in the counteroffensive with the aim of retaking Nijmegen and its bridges. British forces now consisted of the 43rd Wessex, the 50th Northumbrian divisions assisted later by the American 101st and backed by XXX Corps artillery. The line held by the Allies was east of the main road Nijmegen–Arnhem, the line ran through Elst, Bemmel and just west of Haalderen down to the Waal River. Commencing on 30 September, the Germans with some armoured support attacked the Allied line – some ground was gained and over the next few days they continued their attacks. By 3 October the Germans had been repelled, suffering heavy losses in the process, including many of the heavy tanks.

British forces from 50th Division then launched a counter-attack on 4 and 5 October, recapturing most of the lost ground, and also capturing the villages of Bemmel and Haalderen, giving extra strength to hold the bridgehead. The 10th SS Division suffered such grievous losses that it was incapable of any offensive action.

The Germans made one final effort, this time against the American 101st, who had relieved the 43rd Wessex around Randwijk, Driel and Opheusden. The 116th Panzer Division were beaten back at Driel and were forced to withdraw on 5 October. The following day, the 363rd Volksgrenadier Division attempted to take Randwijk and Opheusden from the Americans, and a bitter battle was fought for the possession of the latter. Opheusden lay in rubble and soon became a no man's land, while the Allies stood firm. The 363rd Division was itself destroyed in the fighting.

On 7 October, Arnhem bridge was finally bombed and destroyed by Martin B-26 Marauders of 344th Bomb Group, USAAF. Now unable to ferry heavy equipment across the river, the Germans were unable to mount any further attacks.

Von Rundstedt gave permission for Model to abandon the Arnhem bridgehead, and thus was reduced to small outposts. In November, the Germans flooded the island.

=== Debate on Allied strategy and tactics ===
Operation Market Garden has remained a controversial battle for several reasons.

Allied tactics and strategy have been much debated. The operation was the result of a strategy debate at the highest levels of Allied command in Europe. Much post-war analysis has thus probed the alternatives that were not taken, such as giving priority to securing the Scheldt estuary and so opening the port of Antwerp. However, Montgomery insisted that the First Canadian Army should clear the German garrisons in Boulogne, Calais and Dunkirk first although the ports were damaged and would not be navigable for some time. Admiral Cunningham warned that Antwerp would be "as much use as Timbuktu" unless the approaches were cleared, and Admiral Ramsay warned SHAEF and Montgomery that the Germans could block the Scheldt Estuary with ease. The (French) Channel ports were "resolutely defended" and Antwerp was the only solution. But the Germans reinforced their island garrisons, and the Canadians "sustained 12,873 casualties in an operation which could have been achieved at little cost if tackled immediately after the capture of Antwerp. .... This delay was a grave blow to the Allied build-up before winter approached."

==== Optimistic planning ====
Historian Antony Beevor said in 2021 that "Market Garden was a very bad plan, right from the start." Among the controversial aspects of the plan was the necessity that all the main bridges be taken. The terrain was also ill-suited for the mission of XXX Corps. Brereton had ordered that the bridges along XXX Corps' route should be captured with "thunderclap surprise".

The decision to drop the 82nd Airborne on the Groesbeek Heights, several kilometres from the Nijmegen Bridge, has been questioned because it resulted in a long delay in its capture. Browning and Gavin considered holding a defensive blocking position on the ridge a prerequisite for holding the highway corridor. Gavin generally favoured accepting the higher initial casualties involved in dropping as close to objectives as possible in the belief that distant drop zones would result in lower chances of success. With the 82nd responsible for holding the centre of the salient, he and Browning decided the ridge must take priority. Combined with the 1st Airborne Division's delays within Arnhem, which left the Arnhem bridge open to traffic until 20:00, the Germans were given vital hours to create a defence on the Nijmegen bridge.

At Arnhem, the RAF planners selected the drop zones, refusing to drop near the town on the north side of the target bridge because of flak at Deelen. Another suitable drop zone just to the south of the bridge was rejected because it was thought to be too marshy for landing gliders containing the force's heavy equipment. However, that same drop zone was selected for the 1st Polish Brigade in the third lift, which suggests they were well aware of its suitability. Urquhart allegedly made his objections to the RAF planners, who were unmoved, even when he informed them that the troops and glider pilots were willing to take whatever risks landing closer to the objectives entailed. Urquhart made the best of the RAF planners' decision and thus the three main landing and drop zones were 8–10 km (5.0–6.2 mi) from the bridge, with the fourth being 13 km (8.1 mi) away.

However, in his memoir Urquhart did not claim to have confronted the RAF planners. He just wrote that he "should have liked to put in troops on both sides of the river and as close as possible to the main bridge" and then described the airmen's reasons why that was unacceptable. Sebastian Ritchie could not find evidence of a confrontation in the official records. In 1952 Urquhart told the Cabinet Office historian, "The RAF, I think, quite rightly were not prepared to fly into this defended zone."

After the war Lawrence Wright, operations officer of 38 Group, explained the air planners' reasoning. Parachute troops needed to be accompanied by gliders carrying their equipment and supplies or else they sacrificed combat power. South of the Arnhem bridge, only the Malburgsche Polder was suitable for a glider landing. Ditches, banks, and sparse roads and tracks made the rest of the area unsuitable: most of the glider loads would have been either trapped by impassable ditches or damaged. Unfortunately, the Malburgsche Polder was only large enough for a coup de main force. It could not handle a parachute brigade's gliders. It was also adjacent to a mixed flak battery of 6 heavy and 6 light guns and very visible from the higher north bank. A coup de main would therefore only be possible at night, but the lack of moonlight made that impossible so it was rejected. The Malburgsche Polder was considered acceptable for the drop of the Polish Brigade scheduled for D+2 because the flak would have been overrun by the first lift and there would be a quick link-up with the Polish glider forces that landed near the British. Wright's account omitted the mixed flak battery at Meinerswijk (about a mile west of the bridge) comprising 6 75mm guns and 3 20mm guns and the 37mm flak battery of 3 guns near the south side of the bridge.

In 1951, Gerald Lathbury wrote a letter to Chester Wilmot giving similar reasoning:

Urquhart wanted to drop one brigade near the bridge. It would have had to be south of the river owing to Deelen on the north. It was carefully considered and turned down for the following reasons:

1. The RAF did not want to do it because of flak at the bridge and in town. You say Hollinghurst denies this and we must assume that they would have agreed if he pressed. The general opinion, however, is that the RAF refused.
2. It was considered that no gliders could have been landed with this brigade owing to dykes and bunds. Even if a few gliders could have landed, it was doubtful whether the jeeps and A Tk guns could have been got to a track without engineer work. This would have seriously weakened the brigade.
3. The division would have been split by the river. We must remember that at the time of planning we thought we might have a job to stop the Germans blowing the bridge. If they had, not only would the division have been divided, but that brigade would have been on the wrong side of the river for a bridgehead.

Horrocks was overoptimistic about the speed of the XXX Corps advance, leading him to initially forbid movement by night as both unnecessary and too disruptive. After XXX Corps fell behind schedule (e.g. stopped for about five hours on the 18th by a single flak battery of four 88mm guns), Horrocks rescinded the ban on 19 September with no adverse effects. Two nights had been lost for no good reason.

The planners were also overoptimistic about XXX Corps' ability to cross rivers that the airborne divisions might fail to secure a crossing over. They gathered 9000 engineers, the bridging assets of 21st Army Group and XXX Corps and its three divisions, and an additional 2000 truckloads of equipment from elsewhere in the theatre. There was enough bridging material to build two bridges at each water barrier on the axis of advance. Twenty individual bridging columns were formed, each given a single contingency to prepare for. It therefore only required the issuance of a codeword to dispatch the right column for a given job. If the Germans still controlled the far end of a water barrier, 43rd Division would be called forward to execute a river assault and then provide protection for the engineers.

This part of the plan fell apart at Nijmegen. Neither of the city's two bridges had been captured by 82nd Airborne Division on 17 September, but 43rd Division was not ordered forward until the 20th and it didn't arrive until after the bridges had already been captured by 82nd Airborne Division and Guards Armoured Division. 130th Brigade arrived by 08:30 on the 21st, 214th Brigade arrived at 11:30 on the 21st, and 129th Brigade arrived at 11:00 on the 22nd. They had not been held up by German attacks on the highway: the German attack on Son was over by 11:00 on the 20th—before the 43rd Division had begun to move. Assault boats from the Guards Armoured column were not ordered forward until the evening of the 19th. The boats eventually arrived around 14:45 on the 20th.

Four engineering companies and at least one complete bridging train finally arrived at Nijmegen on the 21st and could have been used for a division-sized left hook across the Nederrijn, crossing near Renkum to the west of the Germans. This proved impossible because all of XXX Corps except for 130th Brigade was tied down holding the corridor and the Waal bridgehead. Rather than sacrificing that brigade in a weak river assault, Horrocks and Browning pretended that they couldn't get the necessary equipment forward. Horrocks wrote that reserves of everything XXX Corps needed to cross the Nederrijn in force were still south of Veghel on the 25th. When Browning gave this excuse to Sosabowski on the 24th, Sosabowski "forcibly told Browning what he thought of British commanders who carried out a major operation across a series of wide rivers without bringing forward a good supply of boats."

Allan Adair was overoptimistic about the difficulties his Guards Armoured Division would face. He recalled that when he arrived at Nijmegen, "I was surprised to discover upon arrival that we did not have the Nijmegen bridge. I assumed it would be in airborne hands by the time we reached it and we'd simply sweep on through." Then after crossing the Waal River at Nijmegen, he was surprised by the polder terrain. "When I saw that island my heart sank. You can't imagine anything more unsuitable for tanks: steep banks with ditches on each side that could be easily covered by German guns." The plan didn't call for 43rd Division to take the lead until after Guards Armoured crossed the Nederrijn at Arnhem, so XXX Corps was either unaware of the difficulty of the polders or dismissed it. Dutch officers stationed at Montgomery's headquarters claimed to have warned the British that tanks would require substantial infantry support in the polders, but that their warnings were politely rejected. At I Airborne Corps HQ, intelligence officer Major Brian Urquhart unsuccessfully argued against the "unbelievable notion that once the bridges were captured, XXX Corps's tanks could drive up this abominably narrow corridor—which was little more than a causeway, allowing no maneuverability—and then walk into Germany like a bride into a church." Urquhart's claim that the terrain difficulties were known ahead of time was corroborated by the 21st Army Group report written in 1944. It included the topographical appreciation prepared by the planners and had a detailed description of the road between Nijmegen and Arnhem:

The old road via ELST 7070 varies from 20 ft to 40 ft in width. The surface is concrete for most of the way, though parts are of rolled clinker.

The road crosses the WAAL river by a new bridge, 716631, to LENT 7164, and traverses the open cultivated plain to the lower RHINE through flat open fields lined with deep ditches, and small scattered orchards near the villages. The road is raised about 4 to 6 feet above the surrounding country. Firm dry, sandy soil. Trees along the roadside and the orchards afford the only cover as far as ELST, whilst deployment is limited to several secondary roads.

==== Weather ====
A precarious timetable at the mercy of the weather resulted in the 101st Airborne Division being without its artillery for two days, the 82nd Airborne without its artillery for a day and without its glider infantry regiment for four days, and the British 1st Airborne Division without its fourth brigade until the fifth day. The more time required to complete the air drops, the longer each division had to devote forces to defending the drop and landing zones, weakening their offensive power.

==== Priority of operation ====
On 4 September the British had captured Antwerp and its all-important port facilities. This action had the potential to greatly shorten the Allies' supply lines and trap Gustav-Adolf von Zangen's Fifteenth Army of almost 100,000 men on the south side of the Scheldt Estuary. Instead, Von Zangen's men, with most of their heavy equipment including their artillery, escaped by boat to South Beveland peninsula (Zeeland province, the Netherlands). In September, the peninsula could have been sealed by a short advance of only 24 km (15 mi) past Antwerp. On 5 September Dempsey told Horrocks that "the Huns are escaping from the bag over the water" and to "Get a cork in." 11th Armoured Division made only a weak attempt before being sent eastwards for Operations Comet and Market Garden. In his memoir, Horrocks tried to shift the blame by feigning ignorance of the German ferry operation and explaining that as a corps commander he was concerned only with tactics and not strategy.

Antwerp then became the responsibility of First Canadian Army. That army's priority, however, was to capture the Channel ports, because they could be made operational sooner than Antwerp and were thought to have sufficient capacity to support 21st Army Group. Antwerp was thought vital only for the American forces, so making it operational fell to the very bottom of Montgomery's priorities in defiance of Eisenhower's orders of 24 and 29 August and 4 September. Montgomery issued these orders on 9 September:

Canadian Army

(a) To take over GHENT from Second Army.
(b) To capture Havre
(c) In the Pas de Calais to capture BOULOGNE, DUNKIRK, and CALAIS in that order.
(d) Then to clear the area of the mainland enclosed in the line BRUGES-GHENT-NICHOLAS.
(e) Then to capture the islands at the mouth of the SCHELDT, i. e., WALCHEREN and others, so as to open up the port of ANTWERP.

Second Army

(f) To operate northwards across the MEUSE and the RHINE, through EINDHOVEN and ARNHEM, and secure the area ZWOLLE-ARNHEM-UTRECHT. Later it will move eastwards to the MUNSTER-HAMM area.

First Canadian Army was starved of supplies, first because of Market Garden and thereafter because of the Battle of Overloon, in which Second Army slogged eastwards towards the Ruhr. On 9 October, Montgomery was still giving the Ruhr priority over Antwerp and tactlessly told Eisenhower's chief of staff Walter Bedell Smith that it was only the Americans who needed Antwerp, not 21st Army Group. The Battle of Overloon was finally called off on 16 October, and Antwerp given priority, after an exasperated Eisenhower complained about Montgomery's failure to open the port. On 20 October, 246 Allied supply ships were waiting in European waters, unable to unload their cargo because of the limited port facilities on the continent. The Communications Zone was effectively using the ships as floating warehouses, selectively unloading ships carrying ammunition, rations, and vehicles. Lower priority ships could be kept waiting longer than 60 days. The costly Battle of the Scheldt finally ended on 8 November and minesweeping could begin, allowing Antwerp to become operational on 26 November and receive its first sea-going convoy on the 28th.

==== Missed opportunities ====
After the Germans took the Arnhem road bridge, the British still had a chance to prevail by building a bridge over the Nederrijn into the perimeter held by the remnants of the 1st Airborne Division. However, the Germans held both the Heveadorp ferry terminal and the Westerbouwing Heights immediately to the north of the terminal. Possession of the heights allowed the Germans to interdict attempts to cross the river into the British perimeter, and the ferry terminal had the only road in the vicinity that led right up to the riverbank and was therefore the only good spot for a Bailey bridge. Horrocks concluded that he could only build a bridge by making a left hook and crossing near Renkum to the west of the Germans, but he was unable to concentrate the necessary forces and bridging equipment before the 1st Airborne's situation became desperate and it required evacuation. Middlebrook criticised Urquhart for not establishing the perimeter with the ferry and the heights securely in the centre. Buckingham noted that this was because Urquhart's absence from Division HQ during the first 40 hours of the battle resulted in the division following the initial plan without considering whether it might be better to defend farther west. By the time Urquhart returned it was too late. Urquhart's chief engineer Lieutenant Colonel Eddie Myers recalled, "The divisional staff, including myself I freely admit, did not realize how important the ferry would become."

Hypothetically, had XXX Corps pushed north, they might have arrived at the south end and secured it (had the Guards Armoured sent more than five Sherman tanks across the bridge at Nijmegen and had they not been later stopped by the German position at Ressen), leaving the way open for another crossing to the north at some other point. There was the smaller possibility of arriving with Frost's force intact. This perceived "lack of guts" caused some bitterness at the time among members of both the British 1st Airborne and the U.S. 82nd Airborne. As it was, XXX Corps did not resume the drive to Arnhem that night, but rather eighteen hours later.

The commander of XXX Corps advocated another course of action. About 25 km (16 mi) to the west was another bridge at Rhenen, which he predicted would be undefended, because of all the efforts being directed on Oosterbeek. This was true, but the corps was never authorised to take the bridge; if it had, it is almost certain they would have crossed unopposed into the rear of the German lines. By this time, it appears that Montgomery was more concerned with the German assaults on Market Garden's lengthy "tail".

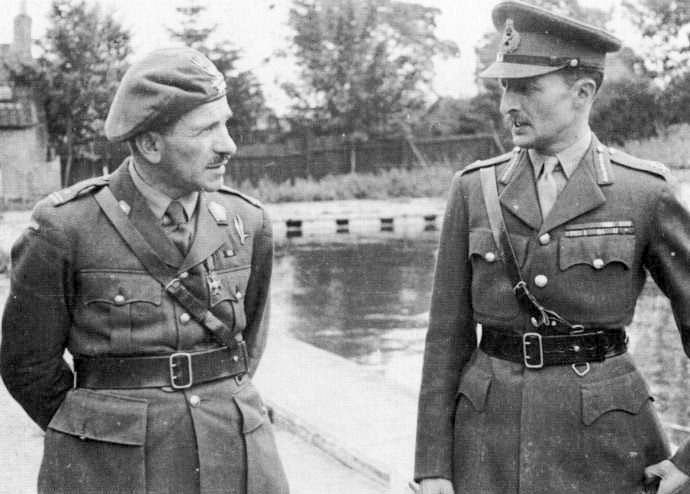
Gen. Sosabowski (left) with Gen. Browning.

Bad choices were made throughout the operation, and opportunities were ignored. The commander of the Glider Pilot Regiment had asked for a small force with gliders to land on the southern side of the bridge at Arnhem to quickly capture it, but he was denied. This was surprising in light of the fact that in Normandy, the British 6th Airborne Division had used such coup-de-main tactics to take the Pegasus Bridge. In Britain, the commander of the British 52nd (Lowland) Infantry Division, whose troops were slated to fly into a captured airfield, pleaded with his superiors to allow a brigade to fly in with gliders to assist Major-General Urquhart's trapped forces. Browning declined the offer, "as situation better than you think" and reaffirmed his intention to fly the 52nd Division into Deelen airfield as planned. This was probably fortunate, as glider landings on undefended landing zones before the eyes of an alert enemy could have resulted in catastrophe. There was another airfield near Grave and the 52nd Lowland could have been landed there, as the 1st Light Antitank Battery did on 26 September. The Polish 1st Parachute Brigade commander, Sosabowski, was prepared to try a dangerous drop through the fog which held up his deployment but again was refused.

The 1st Airborne Division, the least experienced in working as a whole division and the least battleworthy, was given the most distant (and therefore most hazardous) objective and some have argued that an American division would have done better. There were however a number of reasons why the 1st Airborne was the most appropriate choice for Arnhem. It eliminated the risk of damaging the alliance through a British failure to relieve an American division, it gave the 1st Airborne the least complicated mission with the fewest objectives, it would integrate better with XXX Corps for further exploitation, and it was already familiar with the area from planning Operation Comet.

The failure of the 82nd Airborne Division to attach maximum importance to the early capture of Nijmegen Bridge was a major mistake. XXX Corps was also criticised for its inability to keep to the operation's timetable. The most notable example of this was on Wednesday 20 September, when the Nijmegen Bridge had finally been captured and elements of the Guards Armoured Division, after crossing, promptly came to a halt for the night to rest, refuel, and rearm. XXX Corps was delayed at Son by a bridge demolition, and again at Nijmegen (having arrived by D+3, within the maximum time estimate, having compensated for the delay to build a Bailey Bridge at Son). The lead unit of XXX Corps, the Guards Armoured Division, was led by a commander (Allan Adair) whom Montgomery had sought to remove prior to D-Day for lack of drive. Montgomery delegated the task to Dempsey, who then asked Adair's corps commander O'Connor to write an unfavorable report. O'Connor had recently taken over the corps and claimed that he did not know Adair well enough to write the requested report, so Adair kept his job. In 1975, O'Connor admitted that Adair "was not really a flyer." Gavin regretted giving his division's most important tasks (Groesbeek ridge and Nijmegen) to the 508th PIR rather than his best regiment, Tucker's 504th PIR.

==== Intelligence failure ====
Unlike the American airborne divisions in the area, British forces at Arnhem ignored the local Dutch resistance. There was a reason for this: Britain's spy network in the Netherlands had been thoroughly and infamously compromised – the so-called England game, which had only been discovered in April 1944; therefore British intelligence took pains to minimise all civilian contact. U.S. units, without this bad experience, made use of Dutch help. As things turned out, knowledge of the Driel ferry or of the underground's secret telephone network could have changed the result of the operation, especially since Allied radio equipment failed, having to rely on messengers. The latter would have given the XXX Corps and Airborne High Command knowledge about the dire situation at Arnhem.

After the war, claims arose that the Dutch resistance had indeed been penetrated. One high-ranking Dutch officer who had worked in counter-intelligence at SHAEF, Lieutenant-Colonel Oreste Pinto, published a popular book, Spy Catcher, part-memoir and part counter-intelligence handbook. Pinto, who had made a name for himself in World War I for his part in uncovering Mata Hari, claimed that a minor figure in the Dutch resistance, Christiaan Lindemans (nicknamed "King Kong") had been a German agent and had betrayed Operation Market Garden to the Germans. Lindemans was arrested in October 1944, but committed suicide in his cell in 1946, while awaiting trial. In 1969, the French journalist and historian Anne Laurens concluded that Lindemans had been a double agent.

==== Tributes to the participants ====
Eisenhower wrote to Urquhart: "In this war there has been no single performance by any unit that has more greatly inspired me or more highly excited my admiration, than the nine days action of your division between 17 and 26 September".

Montgomery predicted that "in years to come it will be a great thing for a man to be able to say: 'I fought at Arnhem'."

CBS war correspondent Bill Downs, who was assigned to Montgomery's campaign since the Normandy invasion, famously said of Nijmegen that it was "...a single, isolated battle that ranks in magnificence and courage with Guam, Tarawa, Omaha Beach...a story that should be told to the blowing of bugles and the beating of drums for the men whose bravery made the capture of this crossing over the Waal River possible."

=== Debate on outcome ===
==== Contemporaneous ====
Both Churchill and Montgomery claimed that the operation was nearly or 90% successful, although in Montgomery's equivocal acceptance of responsibility for failure he blames lack of support, and also refers to the Battle of the Scheldt which was undertaken by Canadian troops not involved in Market Garden.

Churchill claimed in a telegram to Jan Smuts on 9 October that

As regards Arnhem, I think you have got the position a little out of focus. The battle was a decided victory, but the leading division, asking, quite rightly, for more, was given a chop. I have not been afflicted with any feeling of disappointment over this and am glad our commanders are capable of running this kind of risk. [The risks] were justified by the great prize so nearly in our grasp...Clearing the Scheldt estuary and opening the port of Antwerp had been delayed for the sake of the Arnhem thrust. Thereafter it was given first priority

In 1948, Eisenhower wrote that "The attack began well and unquestionably would have been successful except for the intervention of bad weather." Eisenhower was isolated in the SHAEF HQ at Granville, which did not even have radio or telephone links, so his staff were largely ignorant of the details of the operation. Bedell Smith's objections were brushed aside by Montgomery, as were those of Montgomery's chief of staff Freddie de Guingand who went to England on sick leave.

Montgomery claimed that Market Garden was "90% successful" and said:

It was a bad mistake on my part – I underestimated the difficulties of opening up the approaches to Antwerp ... I reckoned the Canadian Army could do it while we were going for the Ruhr. I was wrong ... In my – prejudiced – view, if the operation had been properly backed from its inception, and given the aircraft, ground forces, and administrative resources necessary for the job, it would have succeeded in spite of my mistakes, or the adverse weather, or the presence of the 2nd SS Panzer Corps in the Arnhem area. I remain Market Garden's unrepentant advocate.

One notable Dutch reaction was:

"My country can never again afford the luxury of another Montgomery success," stated Bernhard, the Prince of the Netherlands.

Air Chief Marshal Arthur Tedder, Eisenhower's deputy, noted that "One jumps off a cliff with an even higher success rate, until the last few inches."

Montgomery disparaged the Polish Brigade in a 17 October letter to Alan Brooke, Chief of the Imperial General Staff: "Polish Para Brigade fought very badly and the men showed no keenness to fight if it meant risking their own lives. I do not want this brigade here and possibly you might like to send them to join other Poles in Italy."

==== Later assessments ====
The post-war American official history of the campaign, written by Charles MacDonald, stated that the operation "accomplished much of what it had been designed to accomplish. Nevertheless, by the merciless logic of war, Market Garden was a failure." The operation failed to establish a bridgehead across the Neder Rijn (Lower Rhine) river and turn the northern flank of the West Wall. MacDonald stated that a salient 65 miles (105 km) deep had been created in the German lines. This salient created a constant threat of an Allied breakout to the north and proved advantageous when the 21st Army Group launched subsequent operations. While a collapse of the German military in the Netherlands was not a formal objective of the operation, MacDonald wrote that "few would deny that many Allied commanders had nurtured the hope" but the operation also failed to realise this. The British official history of the campaign noted that the operation failed, but won "a valuable salient and a bridgehead over the Waal." The official history conceded that these "had no immediate effect on the Allies advance into Germany." The German official history stated that "In terms of the Allies' original objectives, the operation was a total failure"; it failed to cut-off German forces in the Netherlands, failed to flank to the West Wall, and ended any possibility that the war could end before the end of the year. The reasons for these failures are stated to have primarily been poor terrain, bad weather conditions, and faulty intelligence. However, the history conceded that the German counter-objectives ("to hem in the Allied troops south of the Lower Rhine and to destroy them there") were likewise not met.

Responsibility for the failure "began with Eisenhower and extended to Montgomery, Brereton, Browning, and, on the ground side, Dempsey and Horrocks, neither of whom ... galvanised their tank units while there was still time to have seized and held Arnhem bridge". D'Este notes that Montgomery's admission of a mistake was unique: "the only admission of failure by a senior Allied commander".

Rick Atkinson wrote that while "one-fifth of the Netherlands had been liberated ... the rest would endure another nine months of occupation", which resulted in 16,000 civilian deaths. Atkinson stated that the terrain captured "led nowhere", and that the operation failed to achieve its objectives due to "an epic cock-up [of] poor plan[ing] with deficient intelligence, haphazard execution, and indifferent generalship". Carlo D'Este wrote "What had begun with high optimism had turned into a military disaster", and that despite the heroics at Arnhem bridge, the operation "failed to establish a bridgehead north of the Rhine". D'Este argued that this resulted in a stalemate through winter, which saw lengthy attritional battles that obtained little significant territory and caused high casualties.

David Fraser wrote that Market Garden was a strategic failure. Stephen Ashley Hart stated that the operation was "partly unsuccessful", and that Montgomery "immediately reconstituted the Second (British) Army so that it could launch Operation Gatwick, an eastward thrust intended to reach the Rhine near Krefeld". This second attempt was cancelled due to the "precarious state of the ... salient and the failure to clear the flank-threatening enemy salient at Venlo". Michael Reynolds wrote that "With the war still in progress, it was inevitable that Market Garden would be presented to the British and American people as a victory", but stated also: "In reality, it was a strategic failure" that failed to obtain the desired objectives. Reynolds stated "The salient achieved led nowhere and was to prove extremely costly in the coming months", and that "The seven [British commanders] most directly involved ... bear responsibility for the failure of the Operation. It is also clear that, whilst the German commanders were prepared to take all necessary measures and risk to win the battle, even to point of using men untrained in ground warfare, their British adversaries were [not]".

Milton Shulman wrote that the "airborne operation had achieved some useful results" by driving a wedge into the German position and "thereby isolating the Fifteenth Army north of Antwerp from the First Parachute Army on the eastern side of the bulge. This segregation from the rest of the German front complicated the supply problem of Fifteenth Army, which was forced to rely on the inferior crossings over the Maas and the Waal rivers west of the Allied penetration." Shulman stated that the terrain captured "served as an important base for subsequent operations against the Germans on the Rhine", ensured the Allied forces maintained the initiative, forced the Germans to remain on the defensive and ensured they could not assemble enough forces for a counterattack towards Antwerp, and stated that German Fifteenth Army commander called the loss of bridges and terrain as "a great embarrassment to us".

Jonathan Trigg said the plan would have got a red F for Fail at Sandhurst. Eisenhower approved the plan to placate Montgomery, but it lengthened, not shortened, the war as it swallowed up vast amounts of resources which could have been used far more profitably elsewhere, and gave the Wehrmacht a huge fillip. It also squandered precious time that should have been spent breaking into Germany with an all-arms offensive to bring the war to a close in 1944. See Broad front versus narrow front controversy.

Chester Wilmot stated that the captured terrain was "of immense tactical value", which removed "the threat of an immediate counter-stroke against Antwerp; strategically, however, it was in danger of becoming a blind alley, unless the bridgeheads over the Maas and the Waal could be quickly exploited." However, Wilmot noted that the operation failed to achieve its actual objectives, and that Montgomery's claim of a 90 per cent success "is difficult to support, unless the success of the operation is judged merely in terms of the number of bridges captured." Citing the commander of the First Parachute Army, Wilmot stated that the weather was the main contributing factor to the failure of the operation. John Warren wrote that "the greatest airborne operation of the war" had "ended in failure", which had seen "all objectives save Arnhem ... won, but without Arnhem the rest were as nothing." Gerhard Weinberg wrote "At the end of ten days of bitter fighting ... the attempt to 'bounce' the [Rhine] had failed by a narrow margin in the face of reviving Germany resistance".

Antony Beevor, although critical of Montgomery, Browning, and Horrocks, also assigns blame to Gavin for prioritizing the Groesbeck heights over the Nijmegen road bridge. Robin Neillands also believes Gavin shares the blame for the failed operation. "The 82nd should have taken the Nijmegen bridge on D-Day[...]. By failing to do so Gavin made a major contribution to the failure [...] and it will not do to pass the blame [...] on to the British [...].

=== Subsequent combat in the Netherlands ===
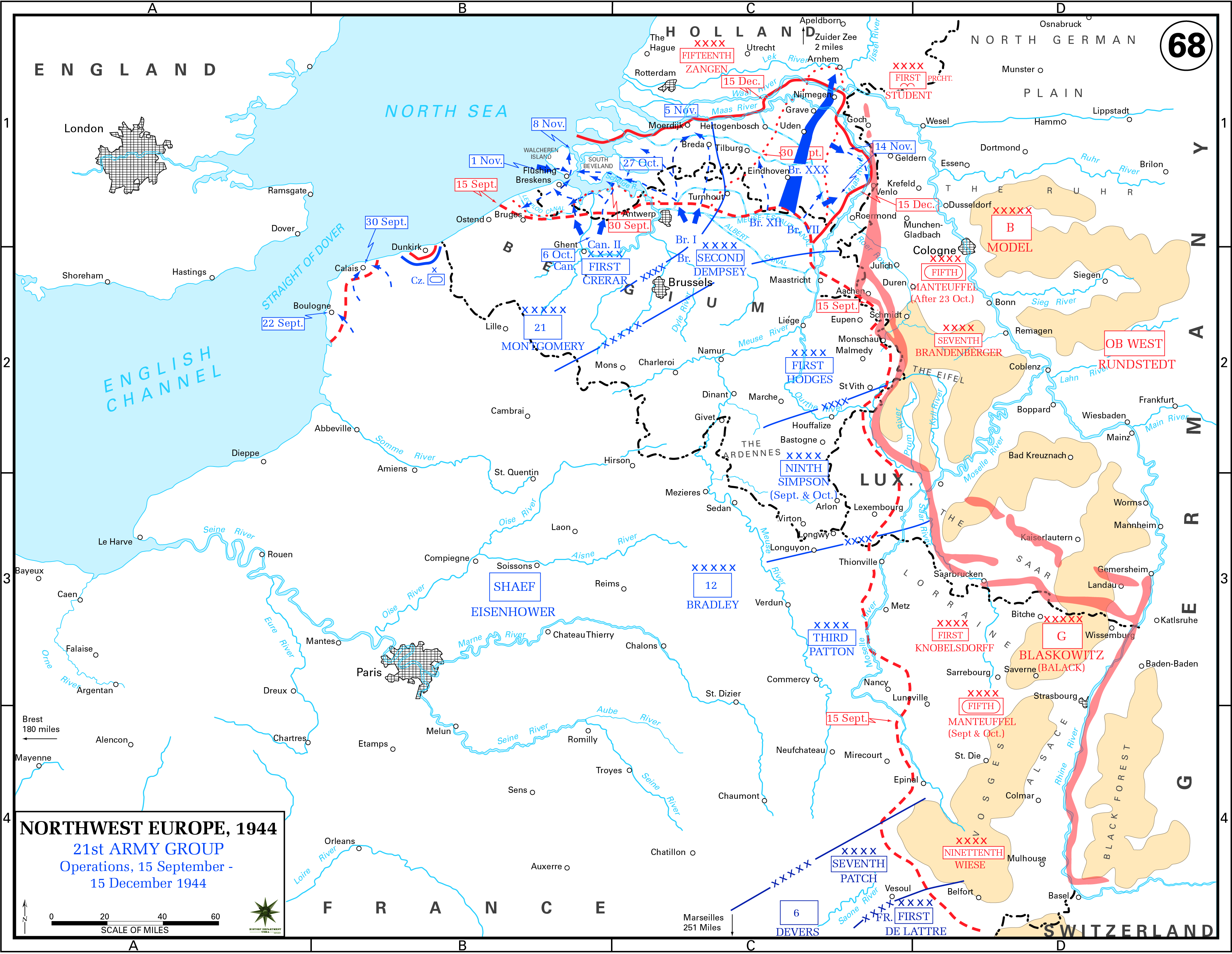
The front line in the Low Countries after Operation Market Garden

After Operation Market Garden failed to establish a bridgehead across the Rhine, Allied forces launched offensives on three fronts in the south of the Netherlands. To secure shipping to the vital port of Antwerp they advanced northwards and westwards, the Canadian First Army taking the Scheldt Estuary in the Battle of the Scheldt. Allied forces also advanced eastwards in Operation Aintree to secure the banks of the Meuse as a natural boundary for the established salient. This attack on the German bridgehead west of the Meuse near Venlo was for the Allies an unexpectedly protracted affair, which included the Battle of Overloon. After Aintree's completion Operation Pheasant was launched on 20 October which saw the Market Garden salient expand westward and resulted in the liberation of 's-Hertogenbosch.

In February 1945, Allied forces in Operation Veritable advanced from the Groesbeek heights which had been taken during Market Garden, and into Germany, crossing the Rhine in March during Operation Plunder. As a result of Operation Plunder, the city of Arnhem was finally liberated by I Canadian Corps on 14 April 1945 after two days of fighting. A surrender of the remaining German forces in the west of the Netherlands was signed on 5 May.

==== Famine in the Netherlands ====
A consequence of the operation's failure was the Dutch famine of 1944–45, also known as the "Hunger Winter". During the battle, Dutch railway workers, incited by the Dutch government in London, went on strike in order to aid the Allied assault. In retribution, the Nazi occupation forces forbade food transportation, and in the following winter, more than twenty thousand Dutch citizens starved to death.

== Commemoration ==
=== Memorials and remembrance ===
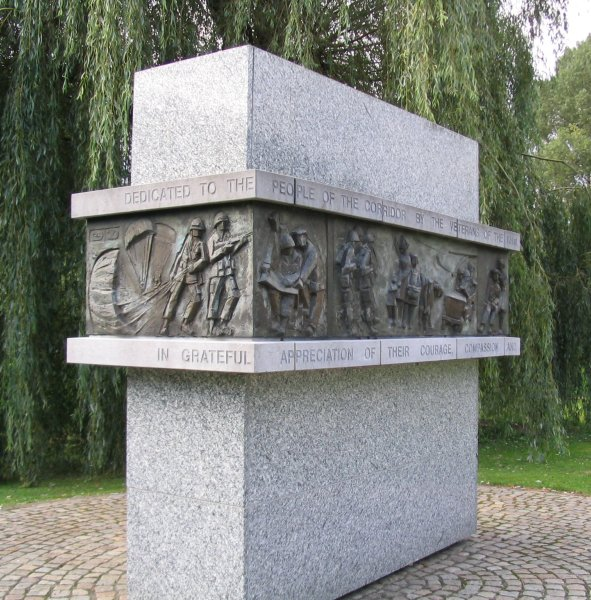
Monument for the Dutch at Sint-Oedenrode

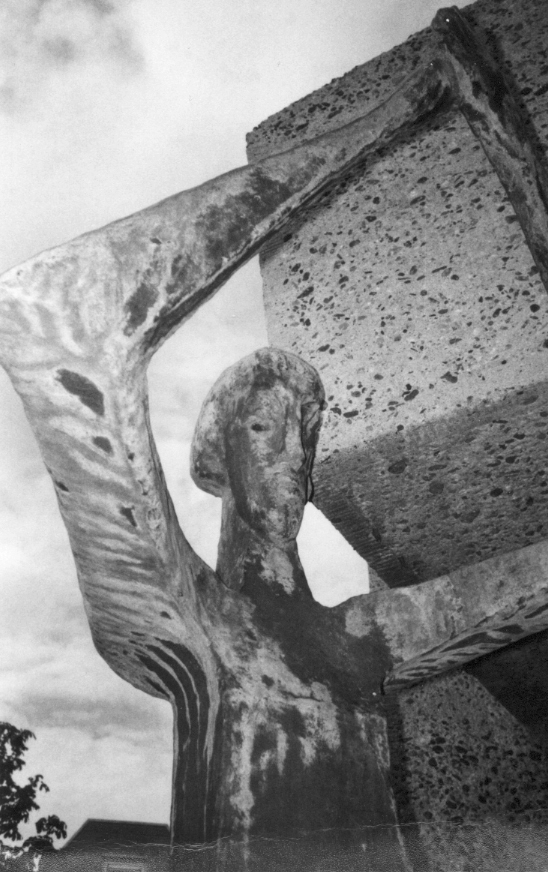
The Polish Monument in Driel at the 'Polenplein'

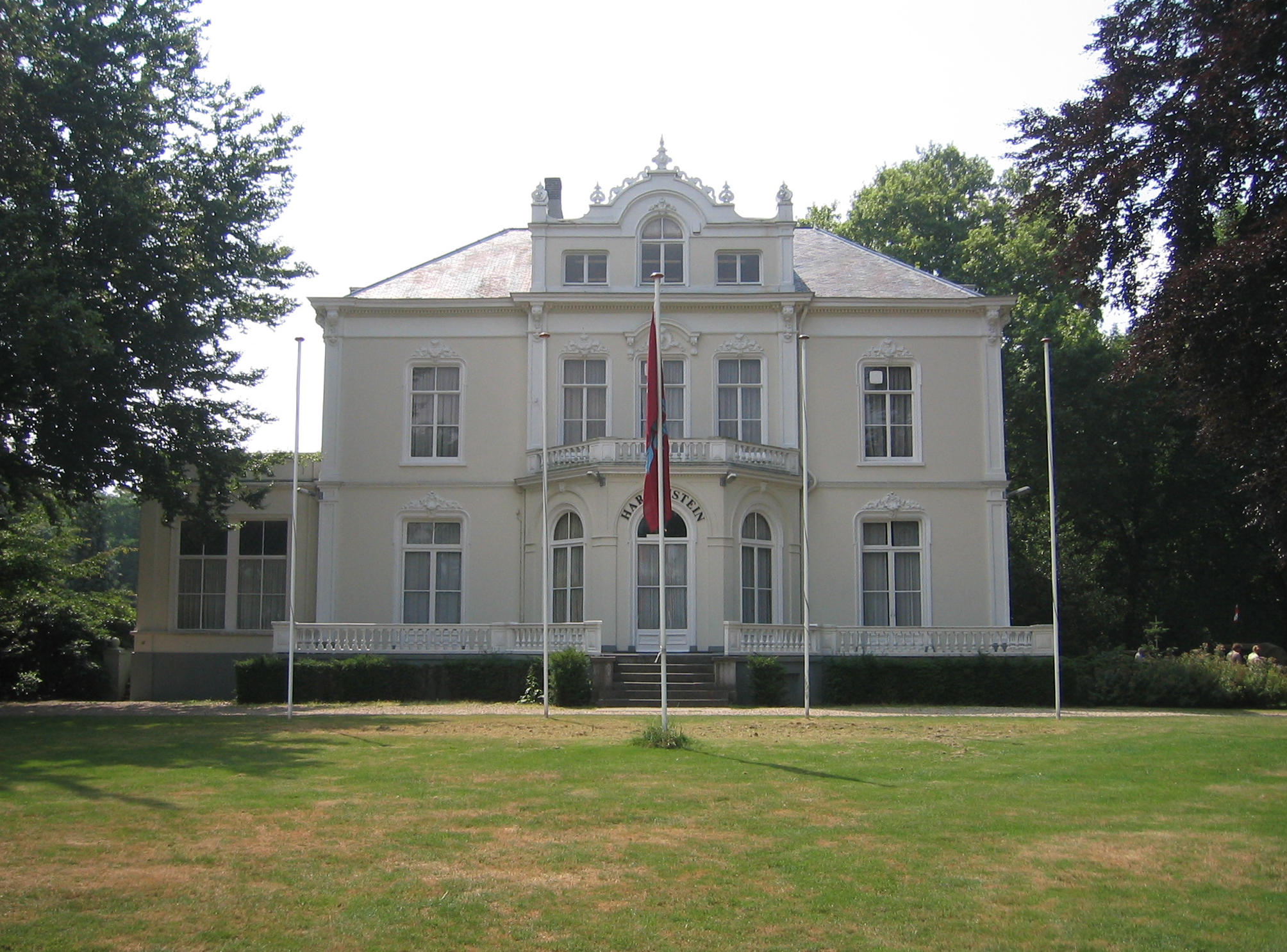
Airborne Museum Hartenstein

The prized Arnhem bridge for which the British had fought so hard did not survive the war. As the front line stabilised south of the Rhine, Martin B-26 Marauders of 344th Bomb Group, USAAF, destroyed it on 7 October to deny its use to the Germans. It was replaced with a bridge of similar appearance in 1948 and renamed John Frost Bridge (John Frostbrug) on 17 December 1977.

There are a number of monuments in the Eindhoven – Nijmegen – Arnhem corridor. A memorial near Arnhem reads:

TO THE PEOPLE OF GELDERLAND
50 years ago British and Polish Airborne soldiers fought here against overwhelming odds to open the way into Germany and bring the war to an early end. Instead we brought death and destruction for which you have never blamed us.

This stone marks our admiration for your great courage, remembering especially the women who tended our wounded. In the long winter that followed your families risked death by hiding Allied soldiers and airmen, while members of the Resistance helped many to safety.

You took us into your homes as fugitives and friends,
We took you into our hearts.
This strong bond will continue
Long after we are all gone.

Several museums in the Netherlands are dedicated to Operation Market Garden, including the Freedom Museum in Groesbeek, Wings of Liberation Museum Park in Best (near Eindhoven) and Airborne Museum Hartenstein in Oosterbeek. Annually there is a commemorative walk in Oosterbeek on the first Saturday of September which attracts tens of thousands of participants.

On 16 September 1994, 101st Airborne veterans unveiled a "Monument for the Dutch" in Sint-Oedenrode. The monument is a gift from the veterans to the civilians who fought alongside of the U.S. troops, much to the surprise and relief of the U.S. soldiers. The inscription on the monument is in English and reads "Dedicated to the people of the Corridor by the veterans of the 101st Airborne Division, in grateful appreciation of their courage, compassion and friendship".

The "Airborne trail" (Airbornepad Market Garden) was created as a permanent reminder of Operation Market Garden by the Dutch hiking association, Wandelsportvereniging de Ollandse Lange Afstands Tippelaars (OLAT) ('Hiking Sports Club of the Long-Distance Walkers of Olland'). It is a 225-kilometre (140 mi), long-distance pedestrian hiking trail that follows as closely as possible the path of the liberating forces, from Lommel to Arnhem. It was officially opened in September 2004, during the festivities marking the 60th anniversary of the Liberation.

A Commemorative Project plaque was unveiled on 23 June 2009, to commemorate the unique military and historical ties between Canada and the Netherlands. A hole, a par five, on the south course (Hylands Golf Course Uplands) in Ottawa, Ontario was named "Arnhem, in honour of the Royal Canadian Artillery squadrons that took part in Second World War allied airborne Operation MARKET GARDEN from 17 to 26 September 1944. The operation, intended to secure a series of bridges so the allies could advance into Germany, fell short when the allied forces were unsuccessful in securing the bridge over the Rhine at Arnhem."

The village of Somerby in Leicestershire has a memorial hall dedicated to the men of the 10th battalion who were based there and who did not return. Each year there is a parade in their honour led by the Seaforth Highlanders.

In 2013 the city of Nijmegen completed the construction of a city bridge exactly at the area where 82nd Division crossed the river Waal on September 20, 1944 as part of Market Garden. In memory of the crossing of the Waal in 1944 by 504th Parachute Infantry Regiment 82nd Airborne Division, the bridge and the road over it bear the name 'De Oversteek' (The Crossing). 48 American soldiers were killed in action during this ‘Waal Crossing’.

As a tribute to these men, the bridge is equipped with 48 pairs of light poles that light up pair by pair from south (Nijmegen) to north (Lent) at sunset, at the pace of a slow march. This artwork, Lights Crossing, was conceived by Atelier Veldwerk.. Each and every day since October 19, 2014, as a daily tribute, a veteran walks the so-called Sunset March across the bridge at sunset while the 48 lights are lit one by one.. Sunset March is based on an idea and design by Tim Ruijling Every veteran who walks the Sunset March for the first time as Veteran of the Day receives a certificate afterwards as a memento.

== Dramatisations ==
There have been two movies dramatising the events of Operation Market Garden. The first, Theirs Is the Glory, was made in 1946, and mixed original footage from the battle with reenactments shot on location in Arnhem. Many of the actors had participated in the battle, and played themselves, including Kate ter Horst, Frederick Gough, John Frost, and Stanley Maxted, a Canadian journalist who posted reports from Arnhem. The second, A Bridge Too Far, was released in 1977 based on the 1974 book of the same name by Cornelius Ryan. Unlike Theirs Is the Glory, which only covered the Battle of Arnhem, A Bridge Too Far covered the entire operation from all sides: British, American, German, Polish, and Dutch. The liberation of Eindhoven during Operation Market Garden is also dramatised in Band of Brothers episode 4, "Replacements".
