= Angeren =

- Village
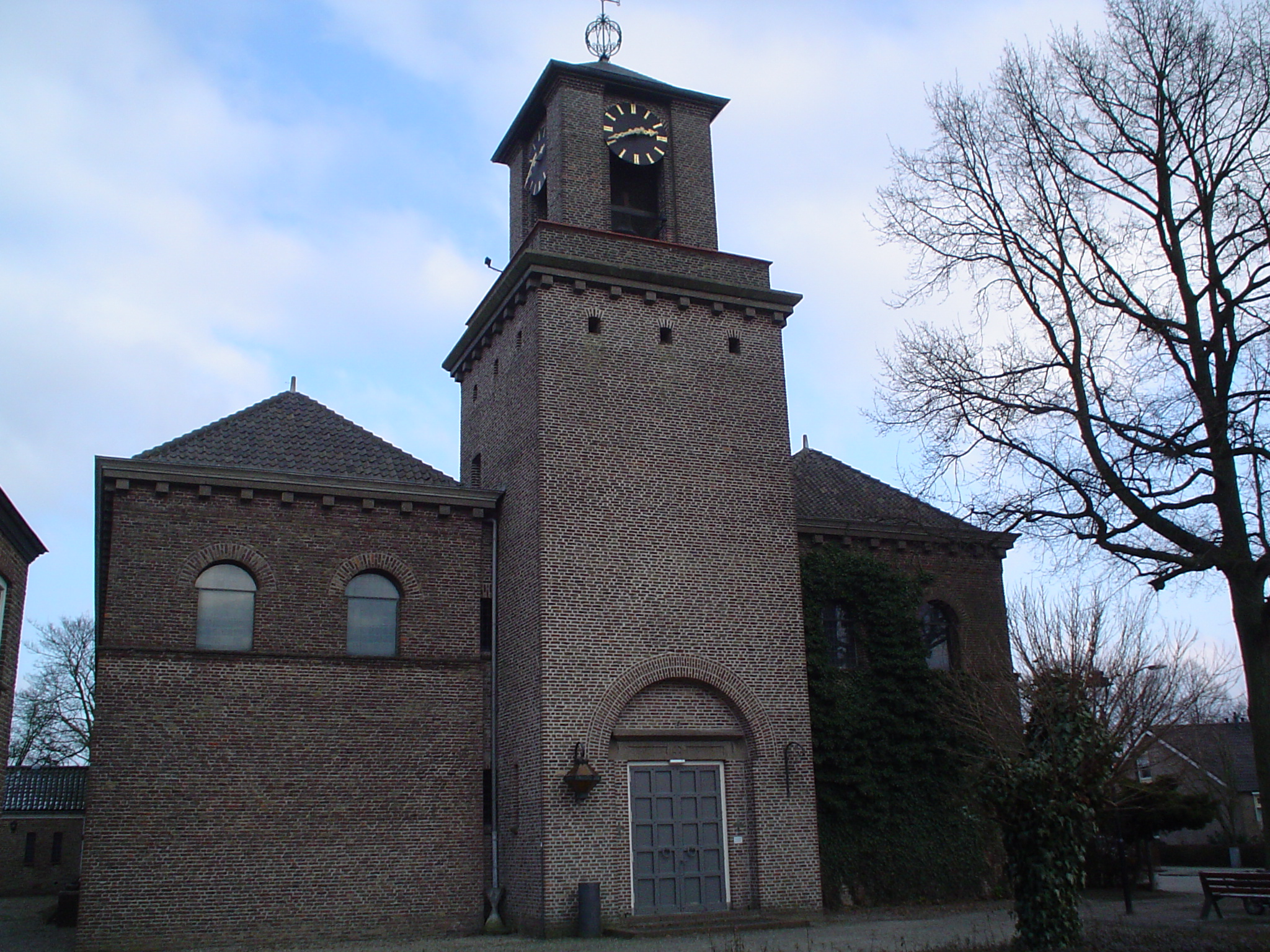
- Bavokerk in Angeren

- Flag

- Location in the province of Gelderland in the Netherlands Angeren (Netherlands)
- Coordinates: 51°54′56″N 5°57′29″E
- Country: Netherlands
- Province: Gelderland
- Municipality: Lingewaard

Area
  - Total: 9.59 km^{2} (3.70 sq mi)
- Elevation: 9 m (30 ft)

Population (2021)
  - Total: 2,880
  - Density: 300/km^{2} (778/sq mi)
- Time zone: UTC+1 (CET)
  - Summer (DST): UTC+2 (CEST)
- Postal code: 6681
- Dialing code: 0481

Angeren (Dutch pronunciation: [ˈɑŋərə(n)]) is a village in the municipality of Lingewaard, Gelderland province, Netherlands. It has a population of 2,851 (1 January 2009), and is located in the very eastern tip of the Betuwe, 2 km to the south of Huissen, between the cities of Arnhem and Nijmegen.

Angeren is first mentioned as Angrina in a document dated 814 or 815. By 1160 Angeren was an independent parish. During the Middle Ages, Angeren grew to a village with a village square, a fortification ('Het Roode Wald') and a flour mill.

The symbol of Angeren is Het Keuje ('The Pig') and there is a small statue of it in the centre of the town. The symbol refers to the historic dependency of Angeren on agriculture (mainly pig farms).

The local football club is S.V. Angeren. Their first squad plays in the 3rd division (Sunday amateurs – Eastern Region KNVB). The local tennis club is called TV Angeren.

Angeren is located at the Linge, a small river that springs up in the nearby town of Doornenburg, and the Pannerdens Kanaal, a canal linking the Waal and the Nederrijn.

The freight train route Betuwelijn (opened in 2007) passes Angeren and crosses the Pannerdens Kanaal via a tunnel. Construction of the train route caused considerable protest in the village: on 4 April 2000 for example, a house that needed to be demolished was occupied by protesters who sat on the roof before being forced off by police. This event caused substantial media coverage.

== Gallery ==
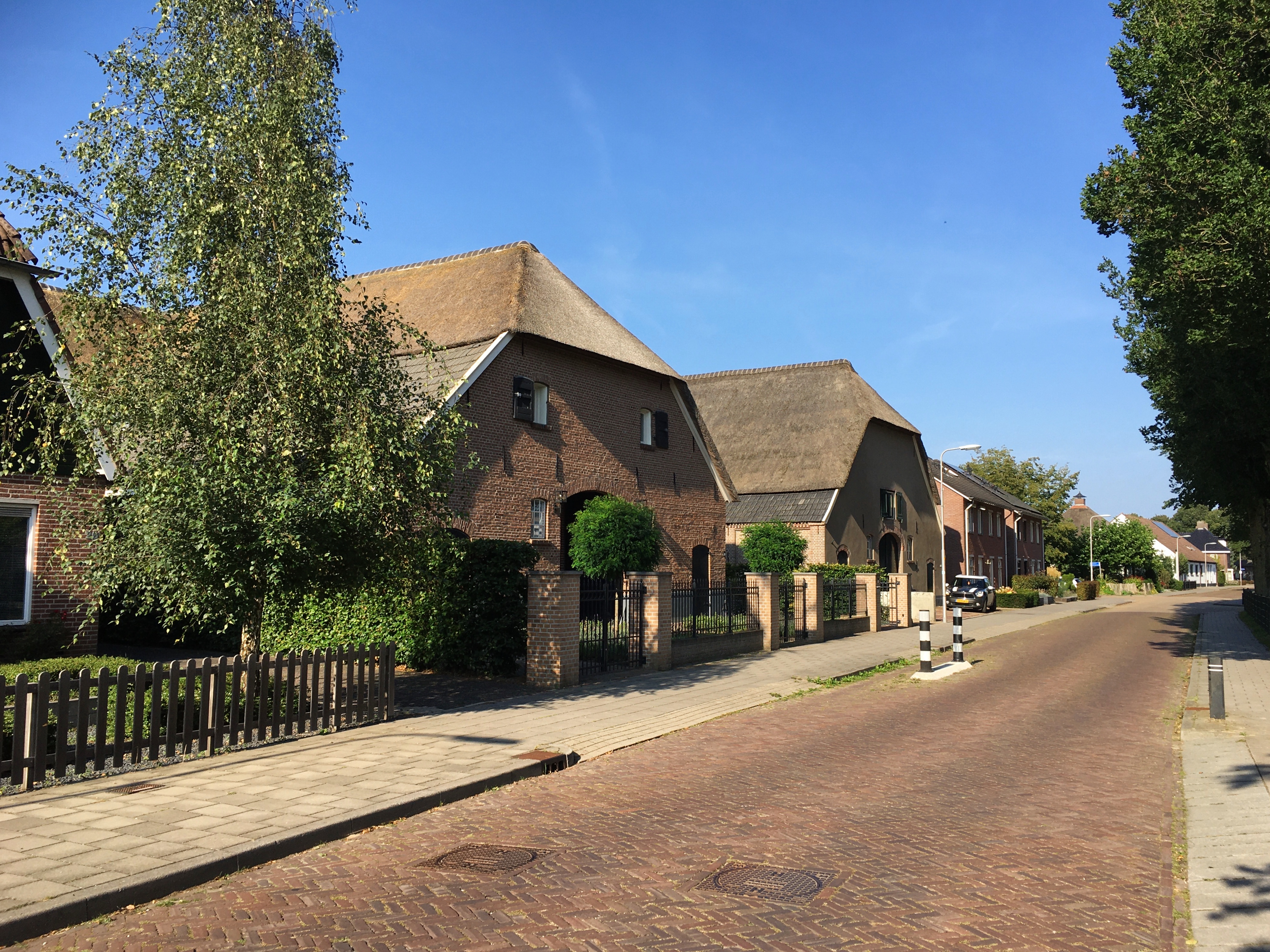
Street view

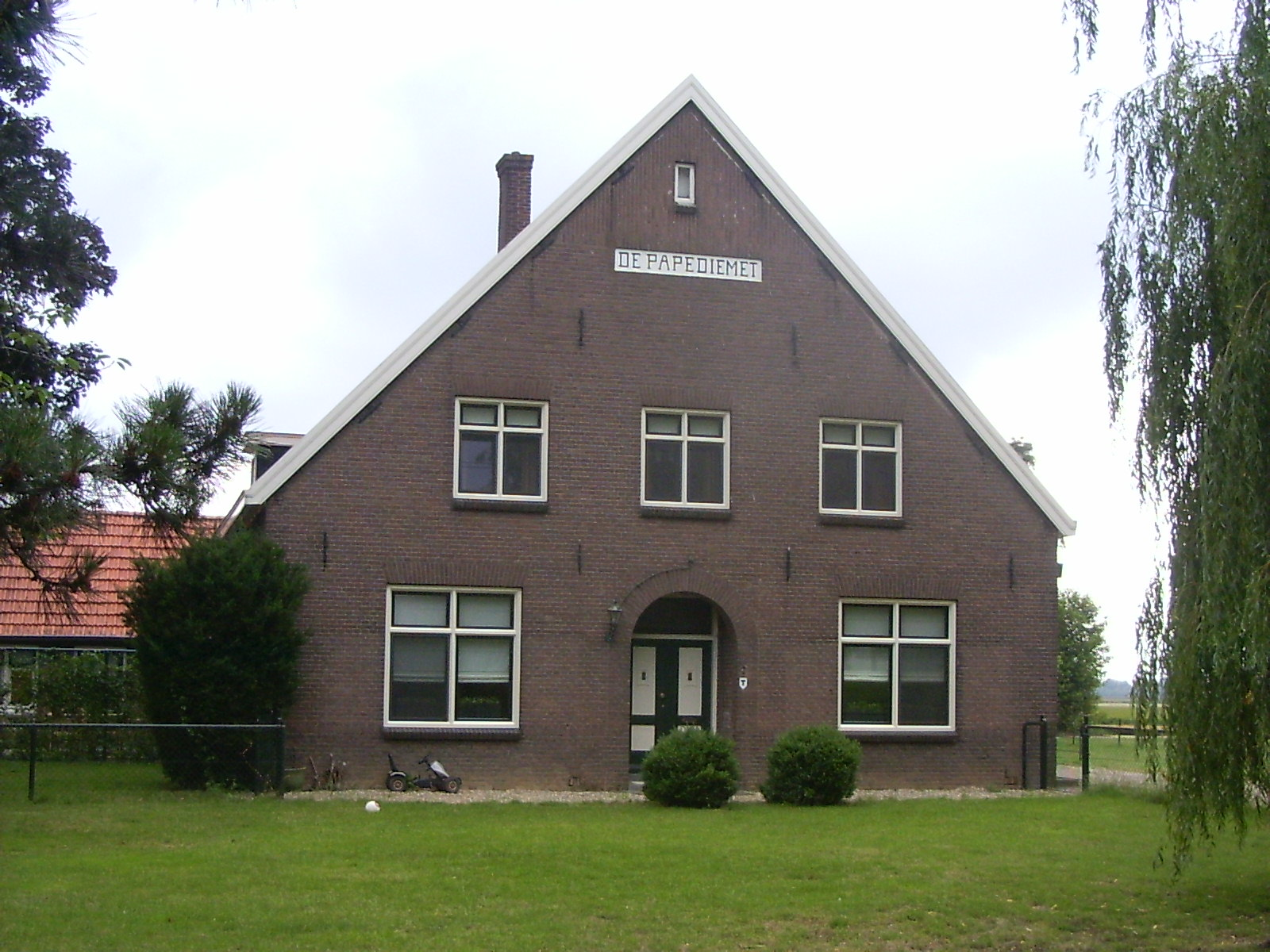
Farm in Angeren

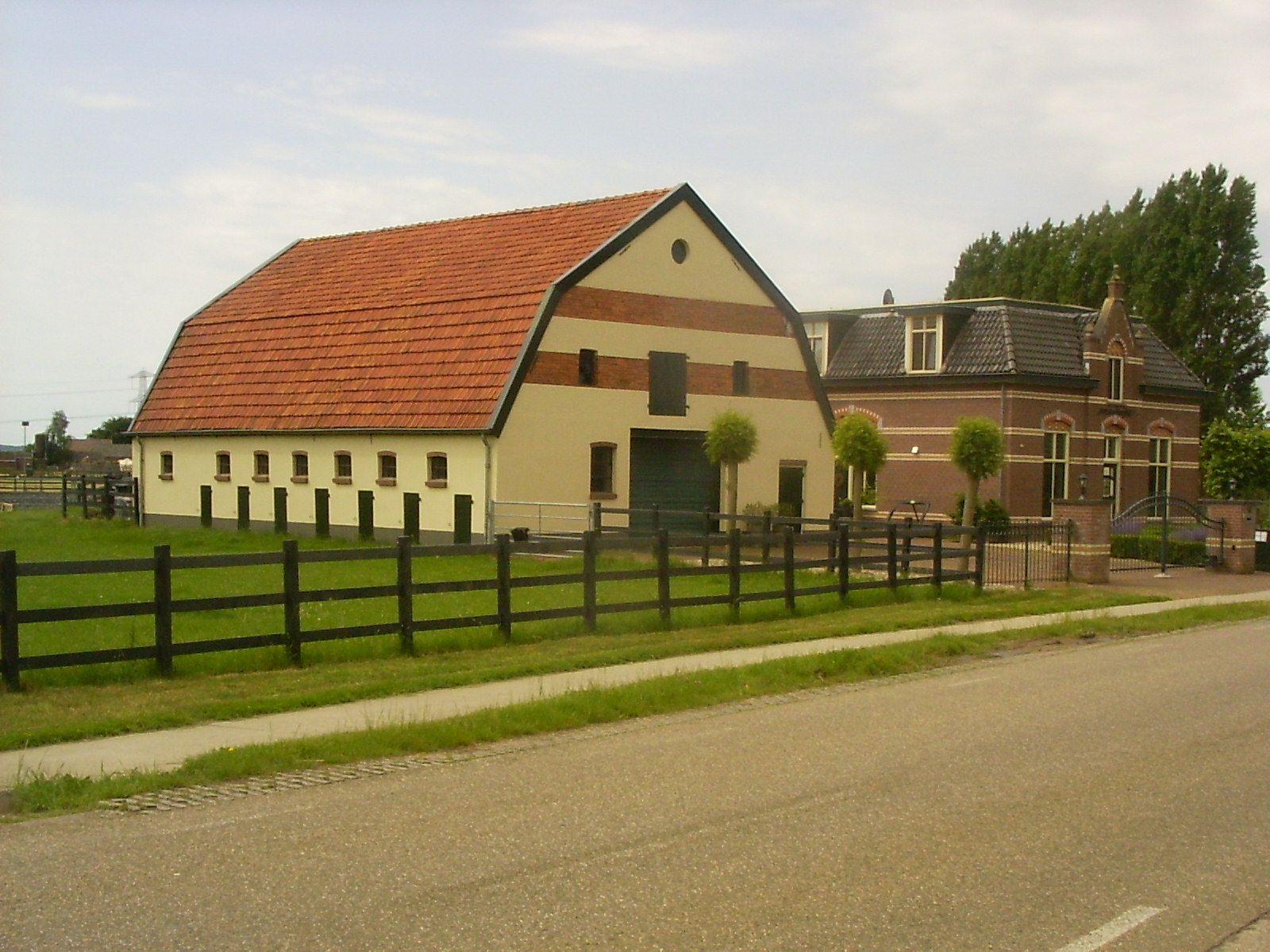
Farm in Angeren

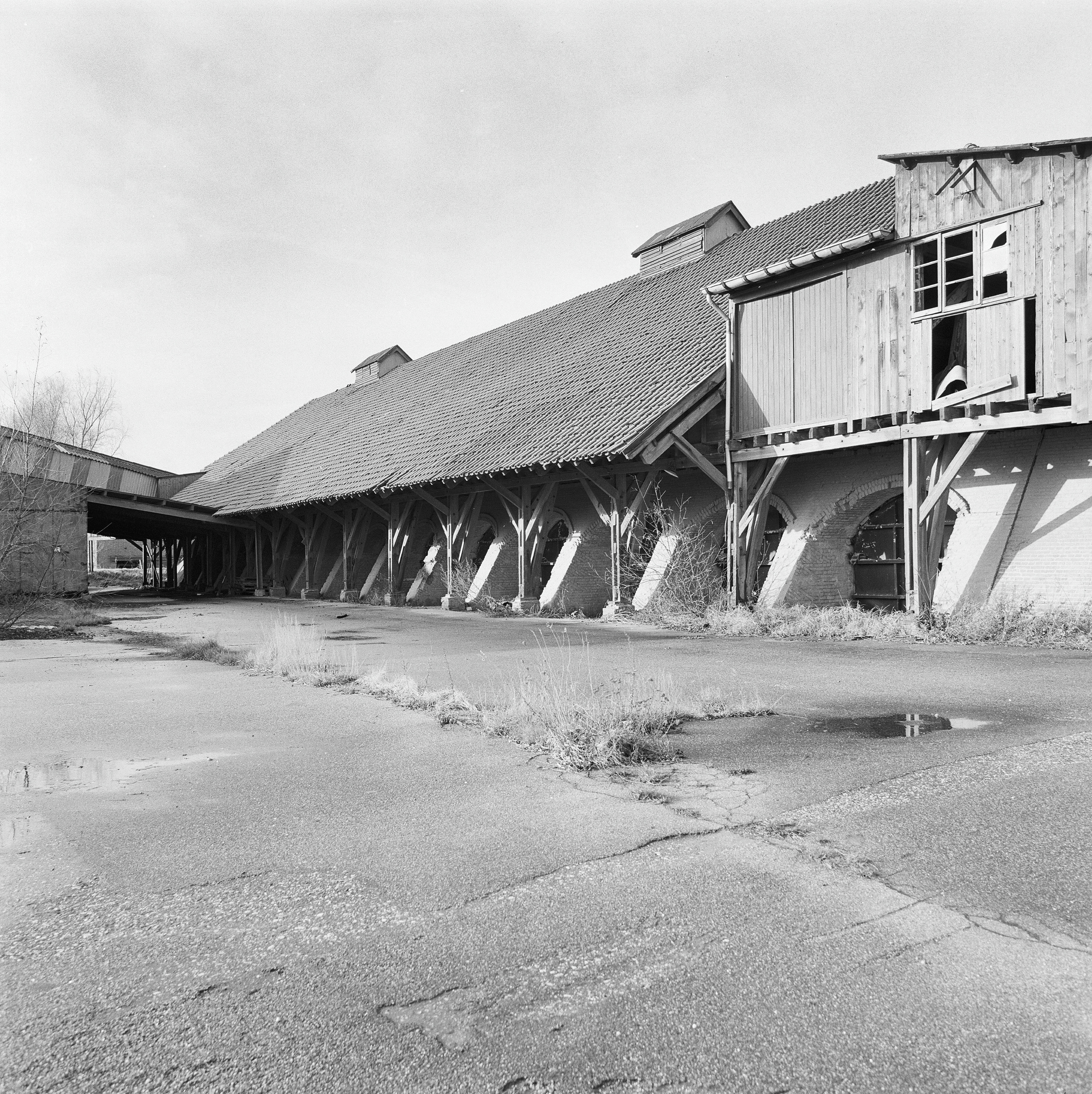
Stone factory (1988)
