= Lingewaard =

- Municipality
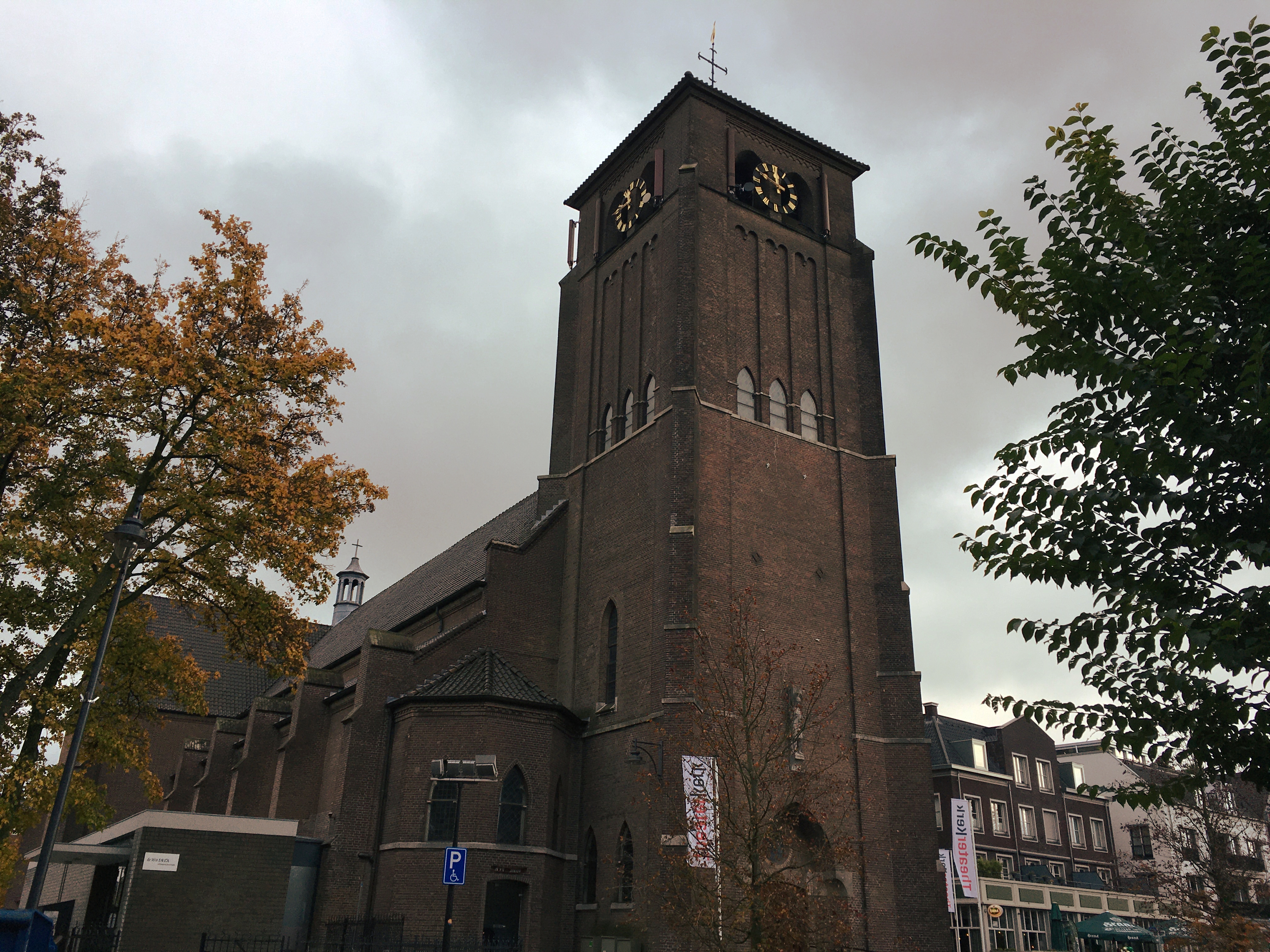
- The Bemmel Theaterchurch

- Flag Coat of arms

- Location in Gelderland
- Coordinates: 51°53′N 5°54′E
- Country: Netherlands
- Province: Gelderland

Government
  - Body: Municipal Council
  - Mayor: Josan Meijers (PvdA)

Area
  - Total: 69.14 km^{2} (26.70 sq mi)
  - Land: 62.00 km^{2} (23.94 sq mi)
  - Water: 7.14 km^{2} (2.76 sq mi)
- Elevation: 11 m (36 ft)

Population (2020)
  - Total: 46,625
  - Density: 755/km^{2} (1,960/sq mi)
- Demonym: Lingewaarder
- Time zone: UTC+1 (CET)
  - Summer (DST): UTC+2 (CEST)
- Postcode: 6680–6681, 6684–6691, 6850–6852
- Area code: 026, 0481
- Website: Lingewaard.nl

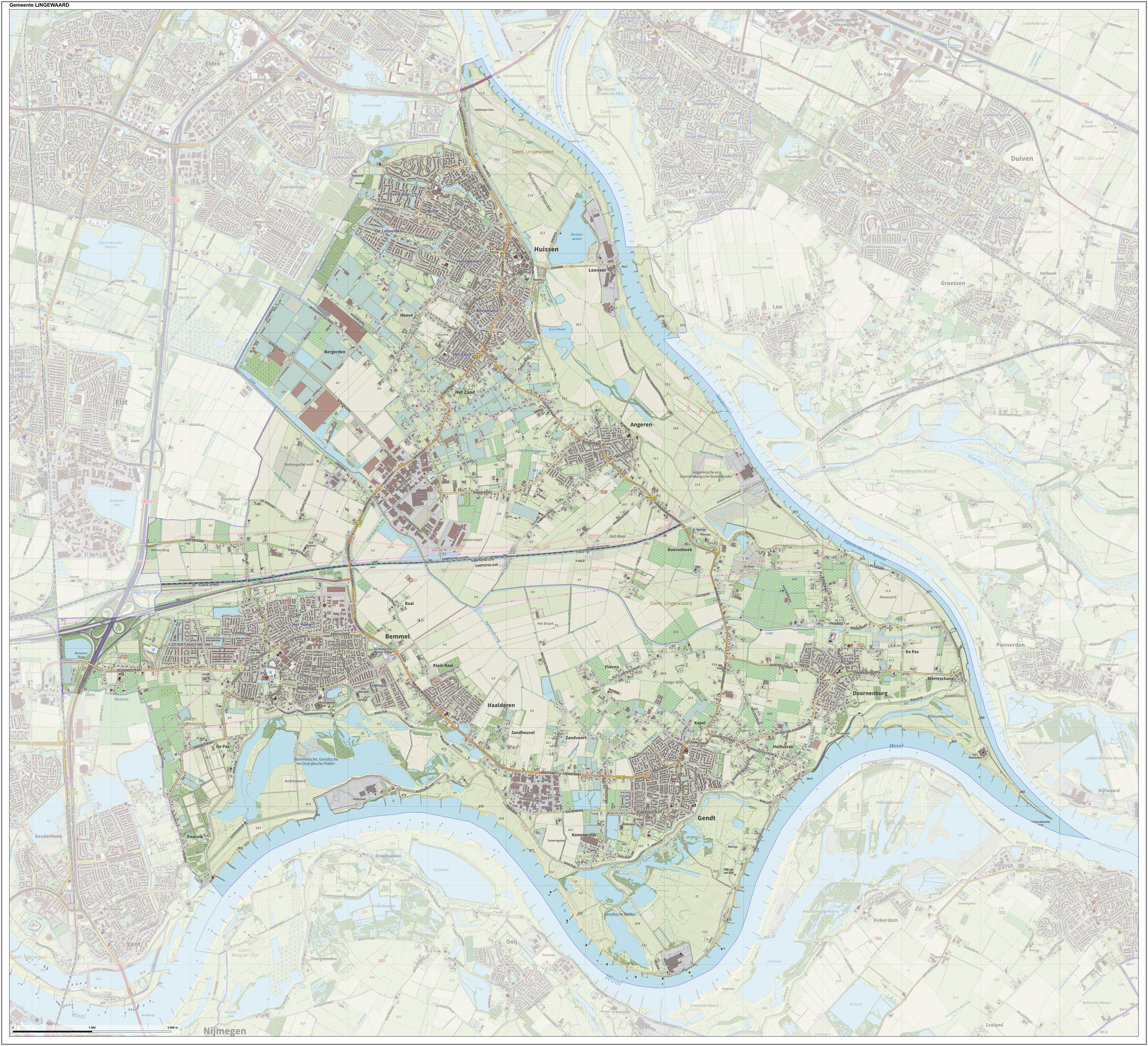
Dutch topographic map of Lingewaard (2015)

Lingewaard (Dutch pronunciation: [ˌlɪŋəˈʋaːrt]) is a municipality in the eastern Netherlands. It is located in the province of Gelderland, in the most eastern part of the Betuwe. The municipality is situated in the lowlands between the major cities of Arnhem and Nijmegen, where many inhabitants work. Since 2021 it has been part of the Arnhem-Nijmegen Green Metropolitan Region (Dutch: Groene Metropoolregio Arnhem-Nijmegen), which aids planning and development in the region's eighteen municipalities.

== Population centres ==
Lingewaard was formed in 2001 as a merger between the former municipalities of Bemmel, Gendt and Huissen. The municipality was initially named Bemmel after the largest former municipality, but later renamed 'Lingewaard' in a referendum. 'Lingewaard' itself is not a population centre but an artificial name, which is favoured by the majority of the voters. The municipality consists of these population centres.

| Towns/villages | Population |
|---|---|
| Huissen | 19,414 |
| Bemmel | 12,161 |
| Gendt | 7,230 |
| Angeren | 2,857 |
| Doornenburg | 2,759 |
| Haalderen | 2,061 |
| Ressen | 137 |
| Looveer (Loo) | 6 |

The industrial park and hamlet of Looveer (included with Loo) comprises a small area located across the Pannerden Canal. Other notable hamlets in Lingewaard are Hulhuizen (included with Gendt), and Doornik (included with Bemmel). Before 1799, Doornik was a village. This village was destroyed because of a levee breach in 1799, whereby all houses were destroyed, including the church.

== Landscape ==
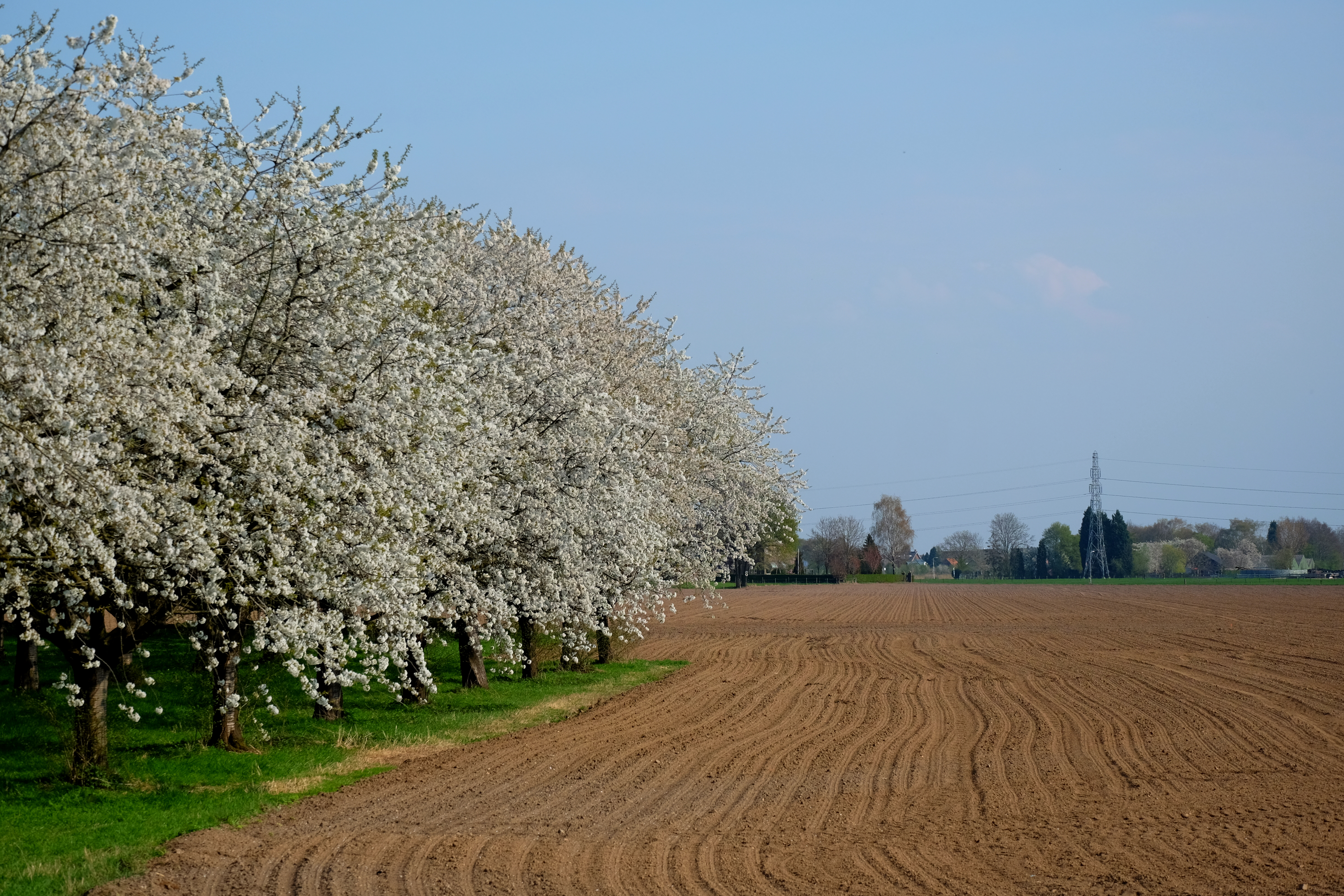
Cherry orchard of Prunus avium in Bemmel

The municipality lies entirely within the catchment area of the rivers Waal, Nederrijn, and Linge. It generally contains many fertile soils that lie on nutrient-rich river deposits. From an agricultural point of view, Lingewaard is well suited for horticulture. The area contains many greenhouses and orchards.

In the south of Lingewaard lies the rewilding area Gelderse Poort, which is managed by Staatsbosbeheer. This nature reserve contains several Dutch riverscape habitats, including: riparian forests, grasslands, small marshes and kolks. Large herbivores (horses and cattle) roam through parts of the area, and play a major role in the landscape character because of their grazing behaviour.

== Notable residents ==
Notable people from the municipality of Lingewaard include:

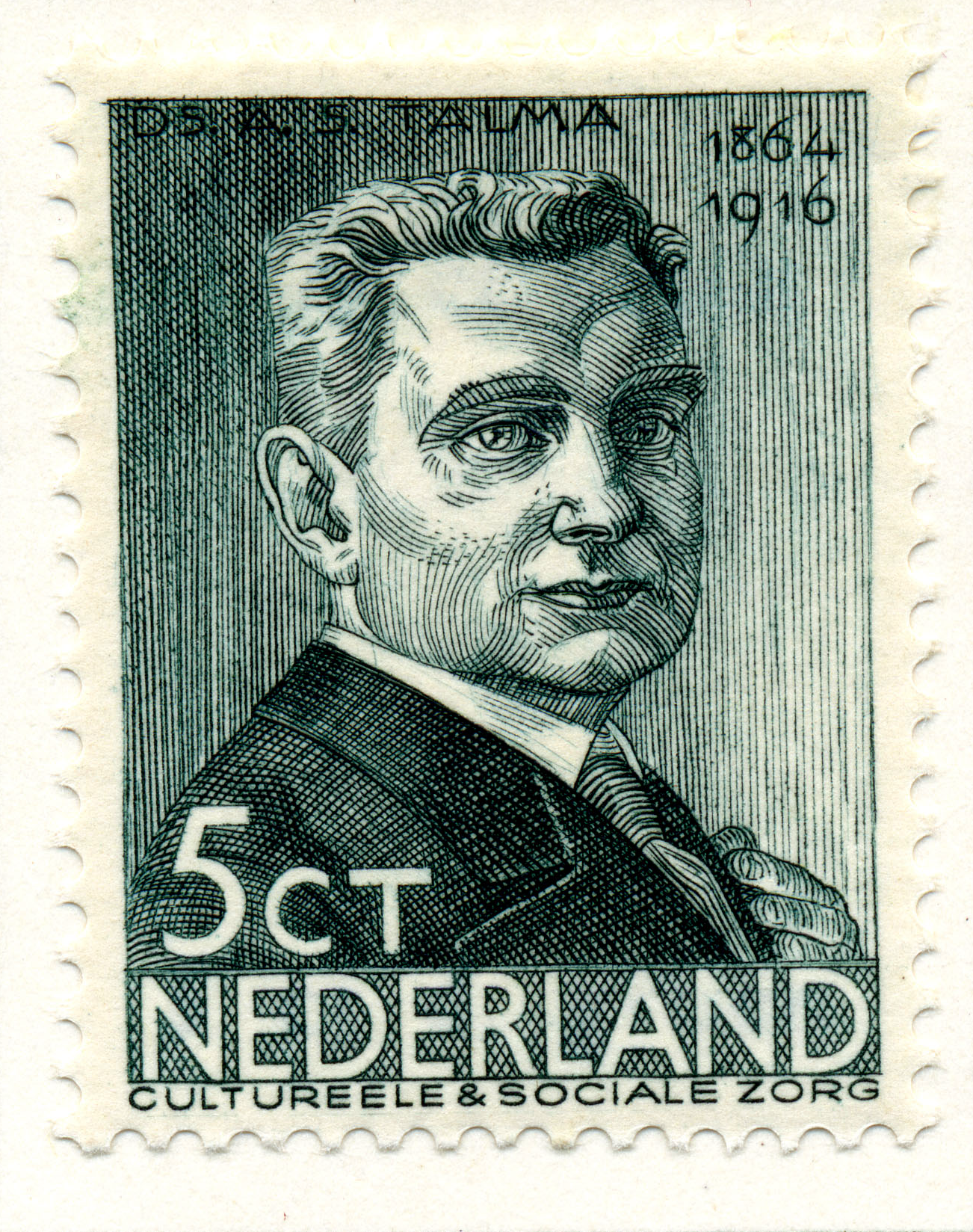
Syb Talma, stamp issued in 1936

- Willem Jacob van de Graaf (born 1736 in Huissen – 1804), the 35th Dutch Governor of Ceylon
- Syb Talma (born 1864 in Angeren – 1916), a Dutch politician
- Gys van Beek (born 1919 in Angeren – 2015), a Dutch-American inventor and member of the Dutch resistance
- Joop Puntman (born 1934 in Haalderen – 2013), a Dutch ceramist and sculptor
- Cor Melchers (born 1954 in Huissen – 2015), a Dutch painter
- Annelies Nuy (born 1960 in Doornenburg), a Dutch fashion designer
- Thomas van Aalten (born 1978 in Huissen), a Dutch writer and journalist
- Ruben Hein (born 1982 in Bemmel) – Dutch jazz musician

=== Sport ===
- Erwin van de Looi (born 1972 in Huissen), a Dutch football manager and former player
- Stijn Schaars (born 1984 in Gendt), a Dutch former footballer with over 300 club caps

== Annual festivals ==
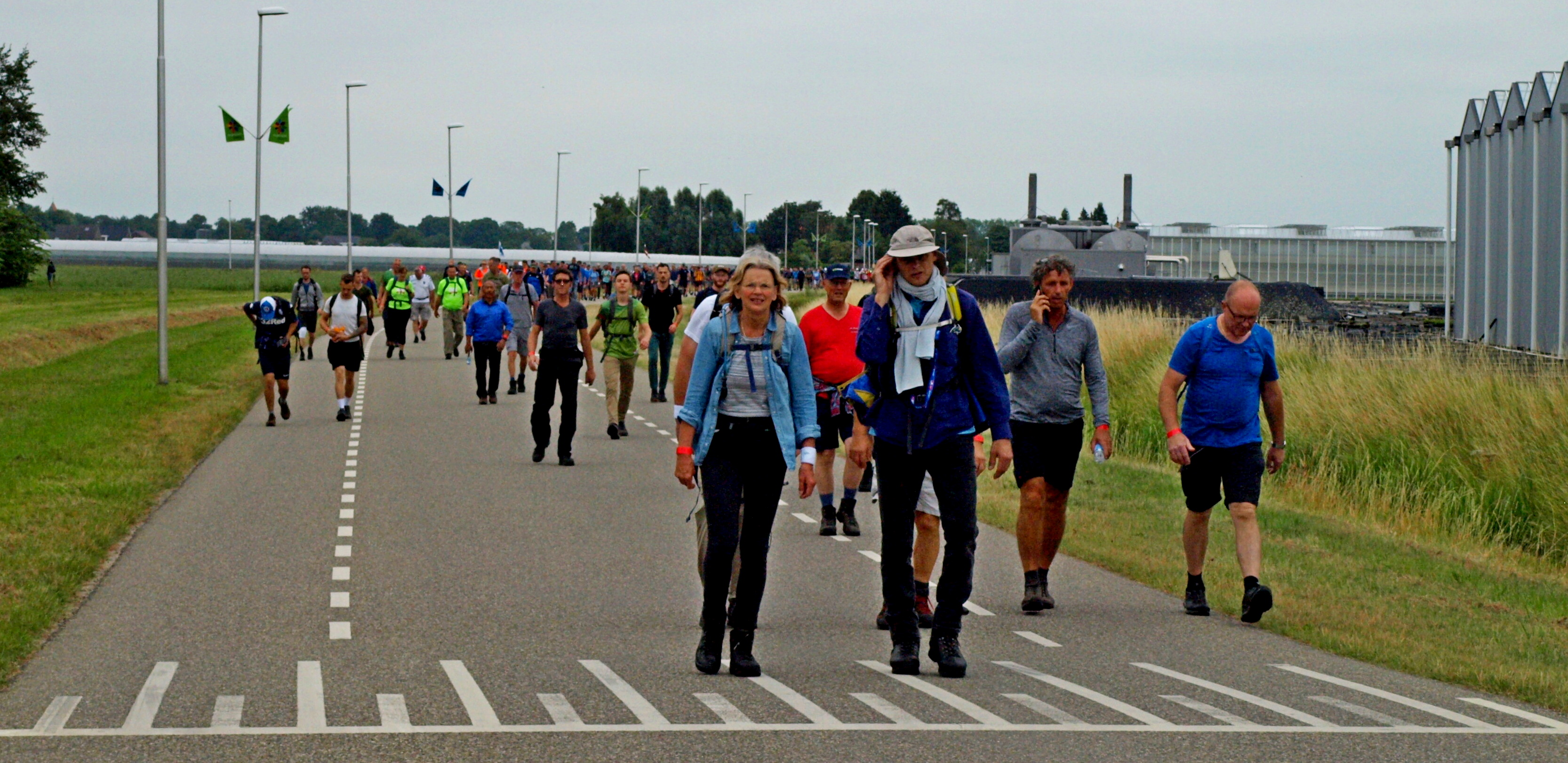
Participants on the first day of the International Four Days Marches in 2019 (Bergerdensestraat, between Huissen and Bemmel)

Notable annual festivals and events in Lingewaard include:

- International Four Days Marches Nijmegen – A multiple day marching event in mid-July, which comes through Bemmel and Huissen on the first day of event.
- Bemmelse Dweildag – An international festival for marching bands in Bemmel, on the second Sunday in June.
- Horse Days of Bemmel (Dutch: Bemmelse Paardendagen) – The annual pony market and horserace in Bemmel, around the second Sunday in August.
- Cherry Festival of Gendt (Dutch: Gendste Kersenfeest) – Annual festival of Gendt at the end of July.
- Under The Milky Way – Local rock festival of Lingewaard, located in the floodplains of Huissen, in the end of August or beginning of September.

== Gallery ==
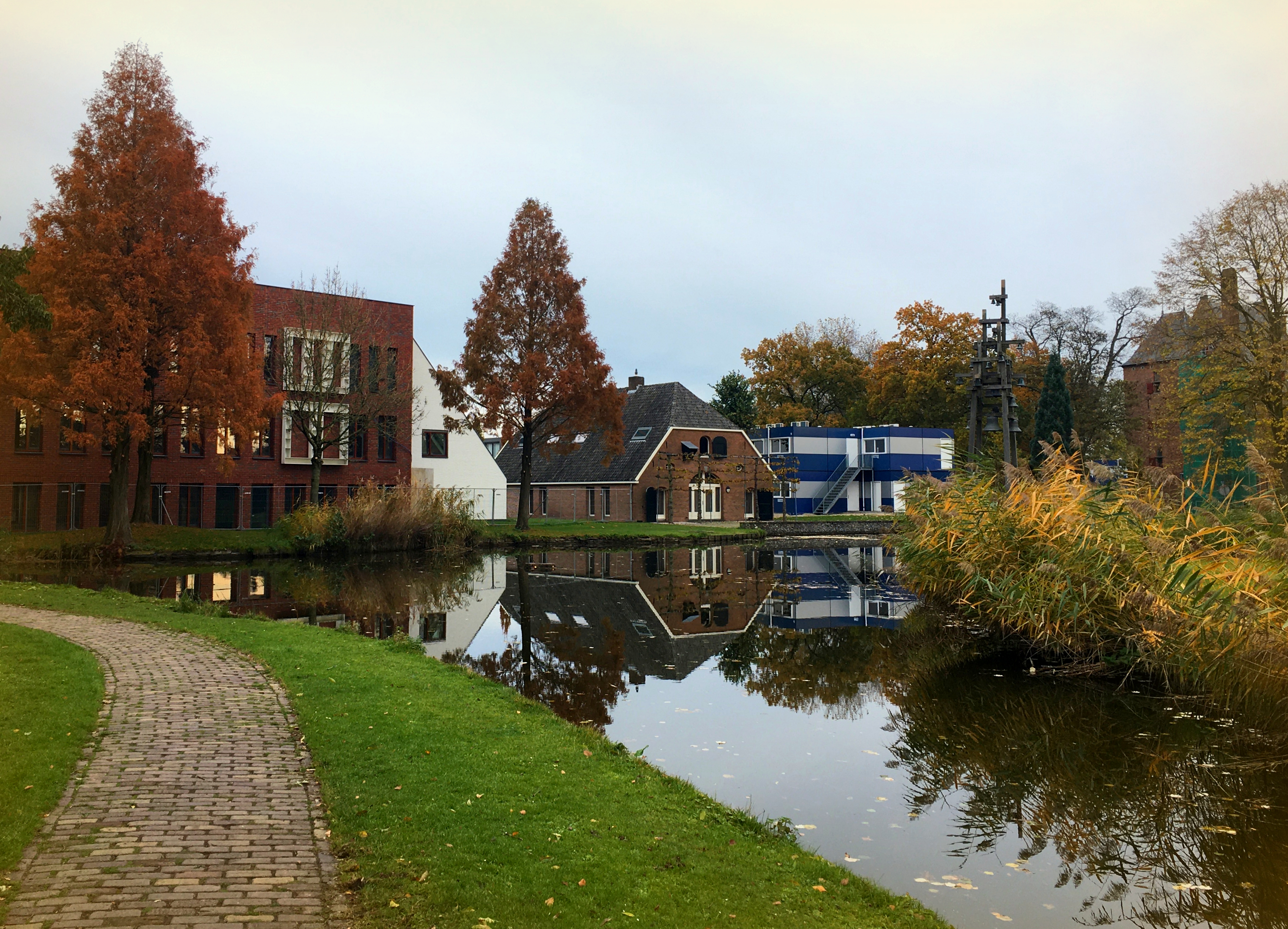
Town Hall of Lingewaard

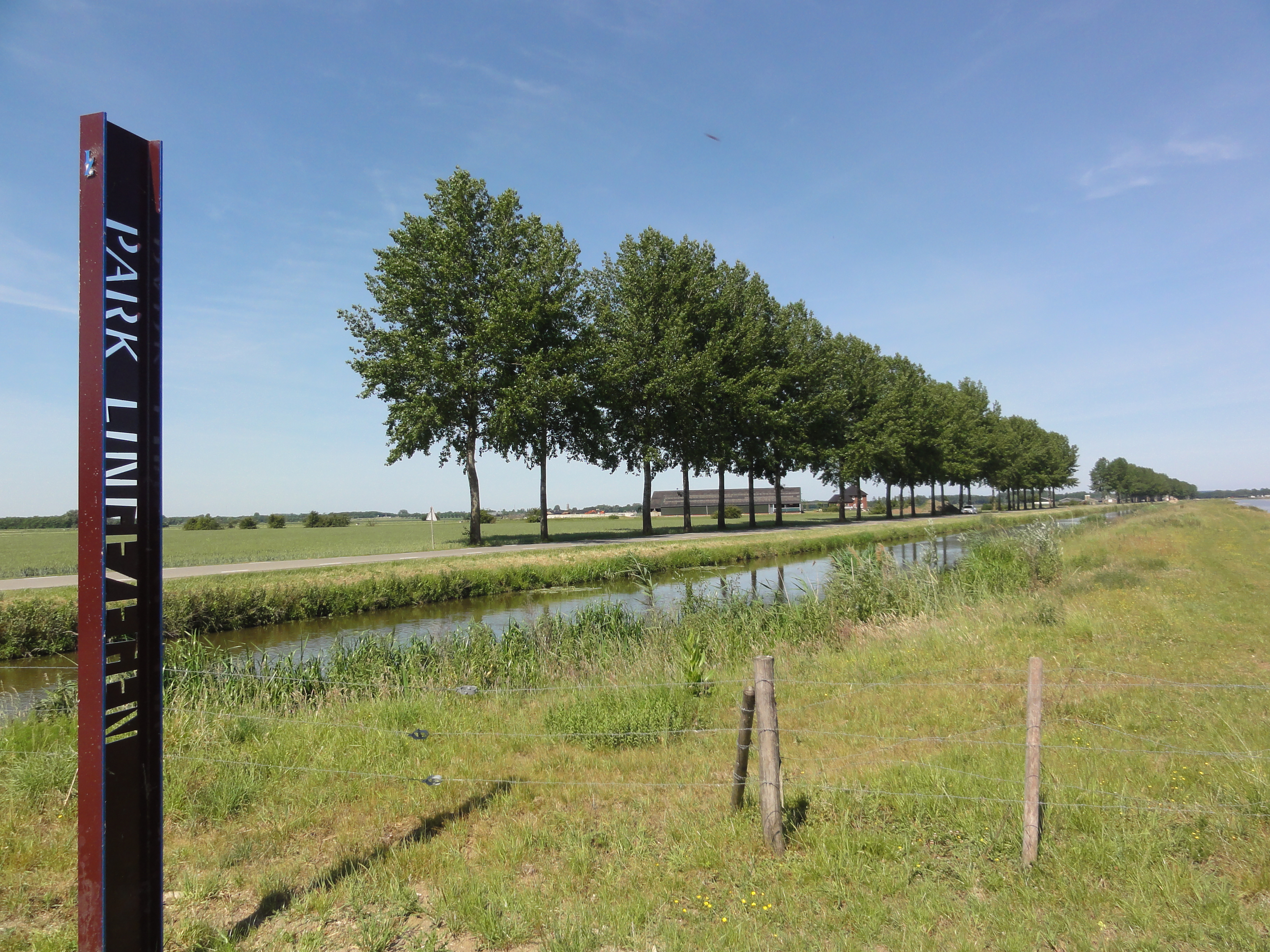
The Linge river at Park Lingezegen, Bemmel

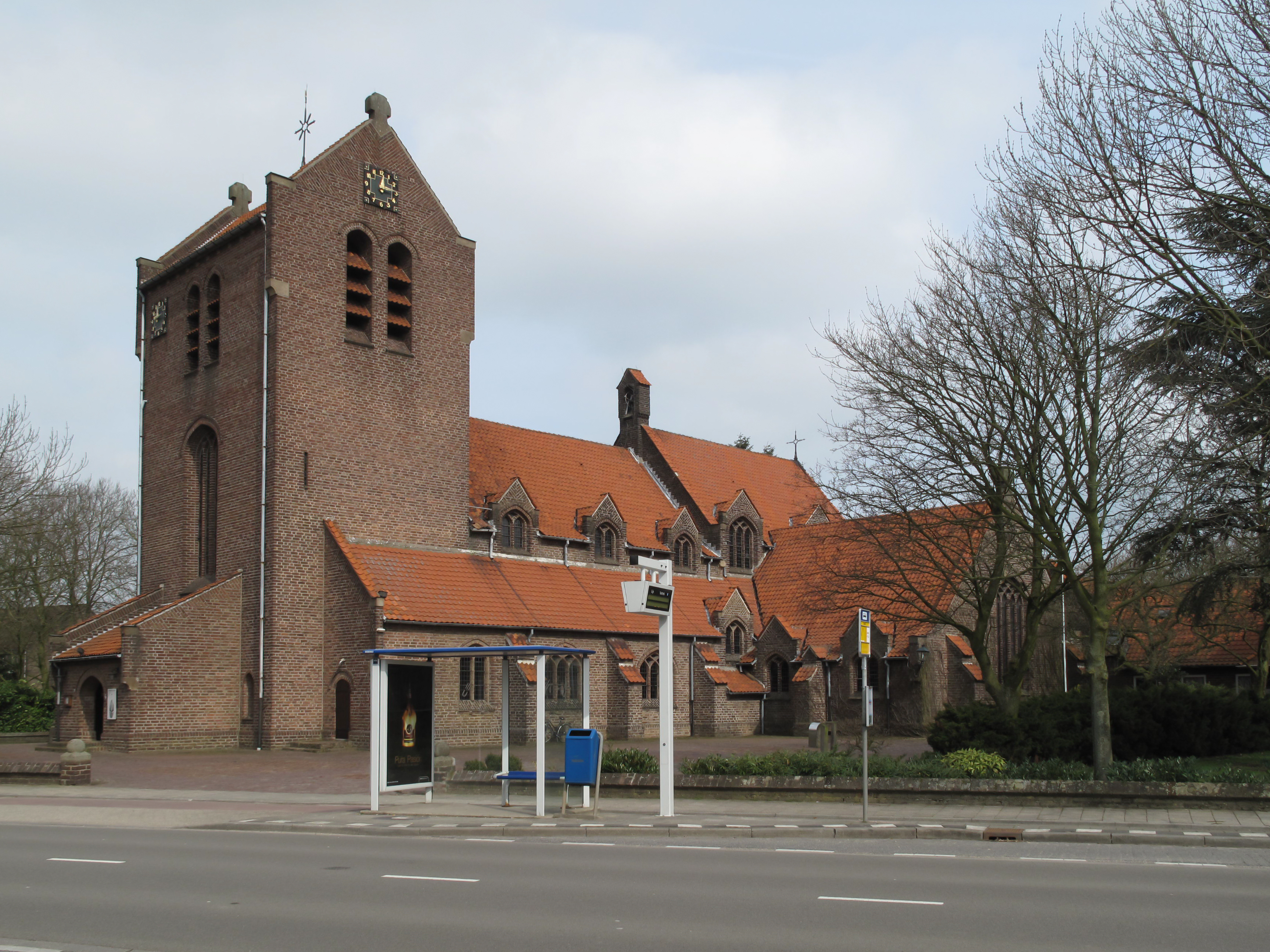
The church of Haalderen OLV van Zeven Smarten

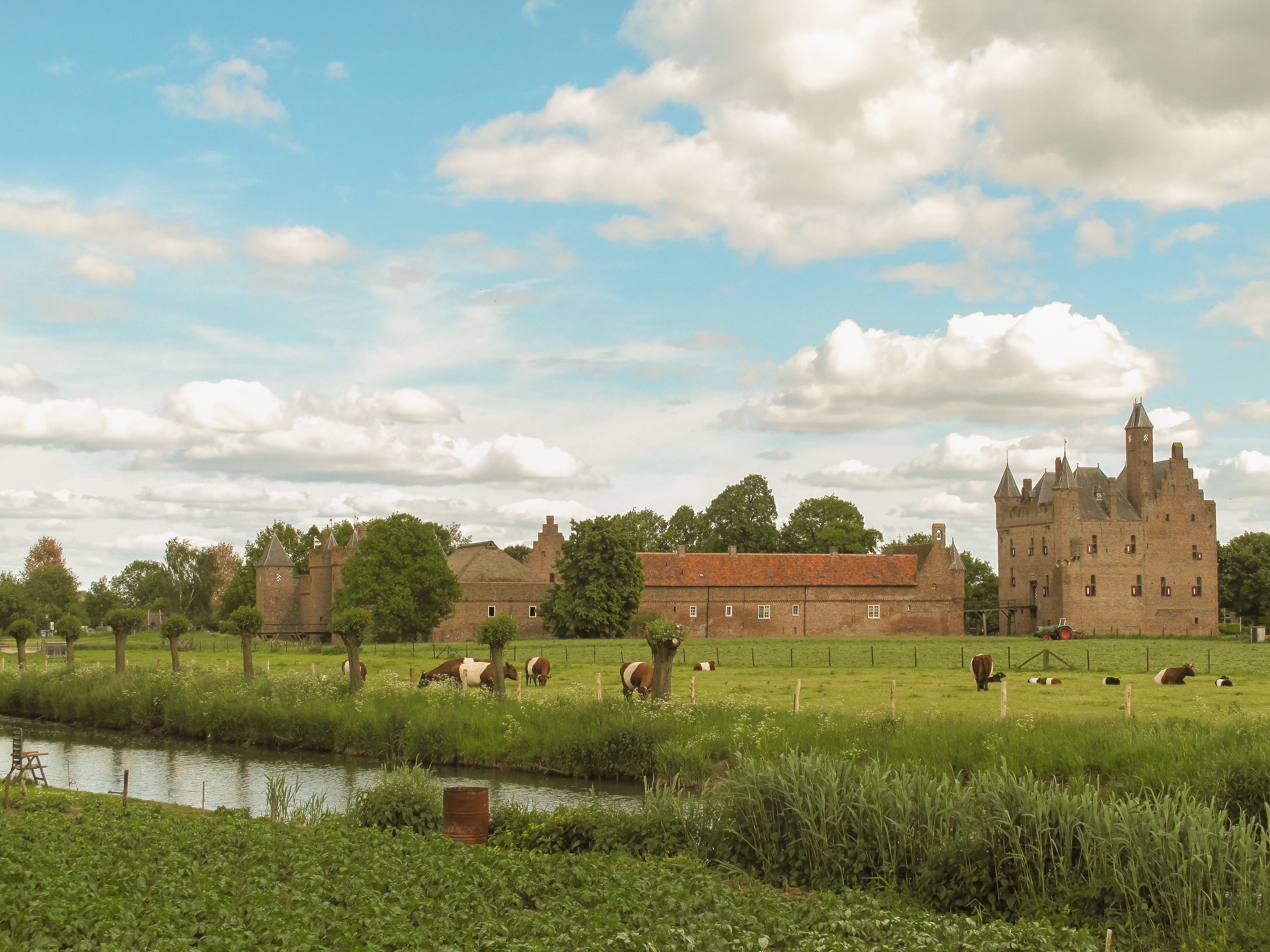
View on Doornenburg Castle at Doornenburg

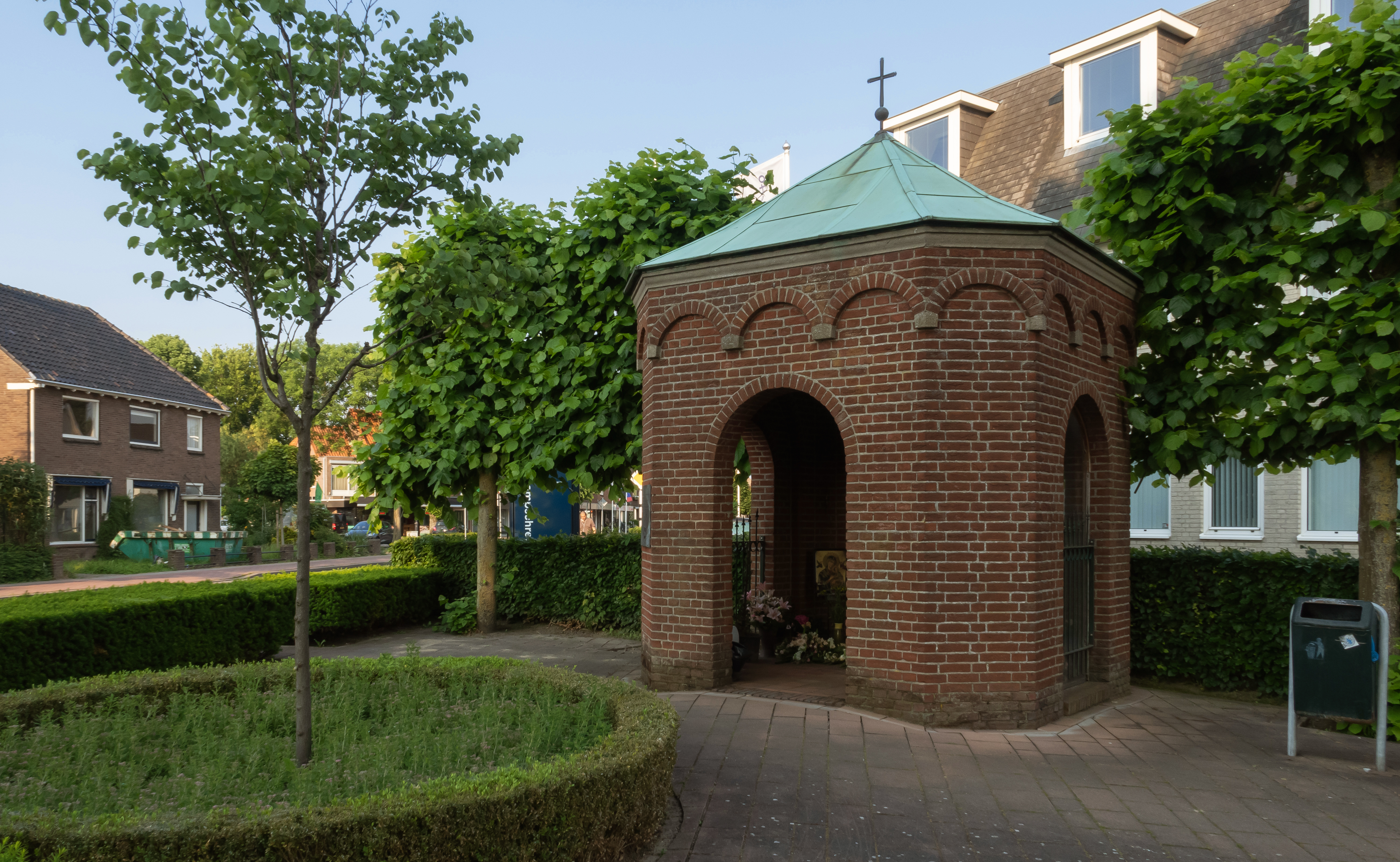
Huissen, chapel at the Duisterestraat-Van Voorststraat

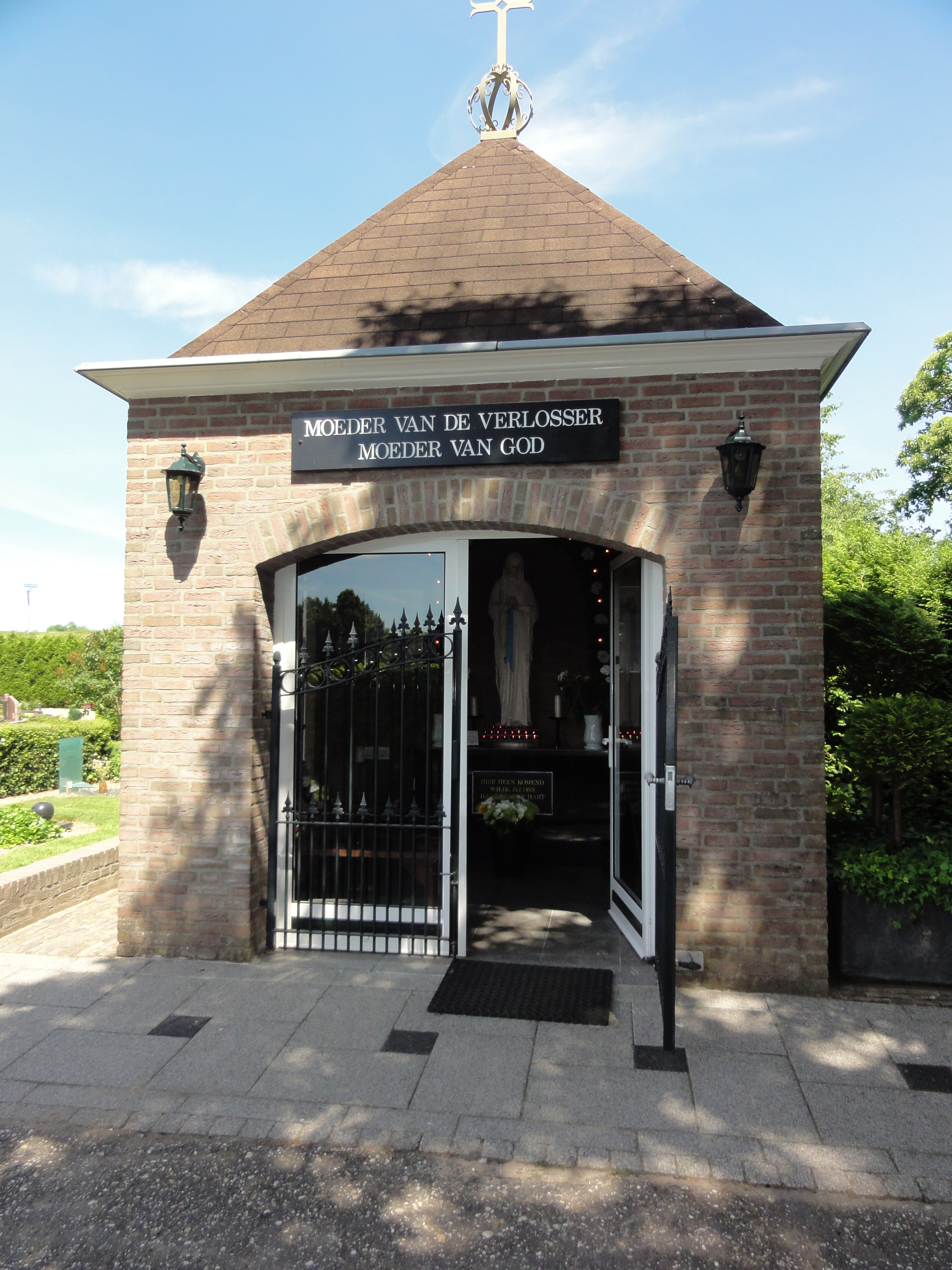
Maria Chapel near the graveyard of Angeren

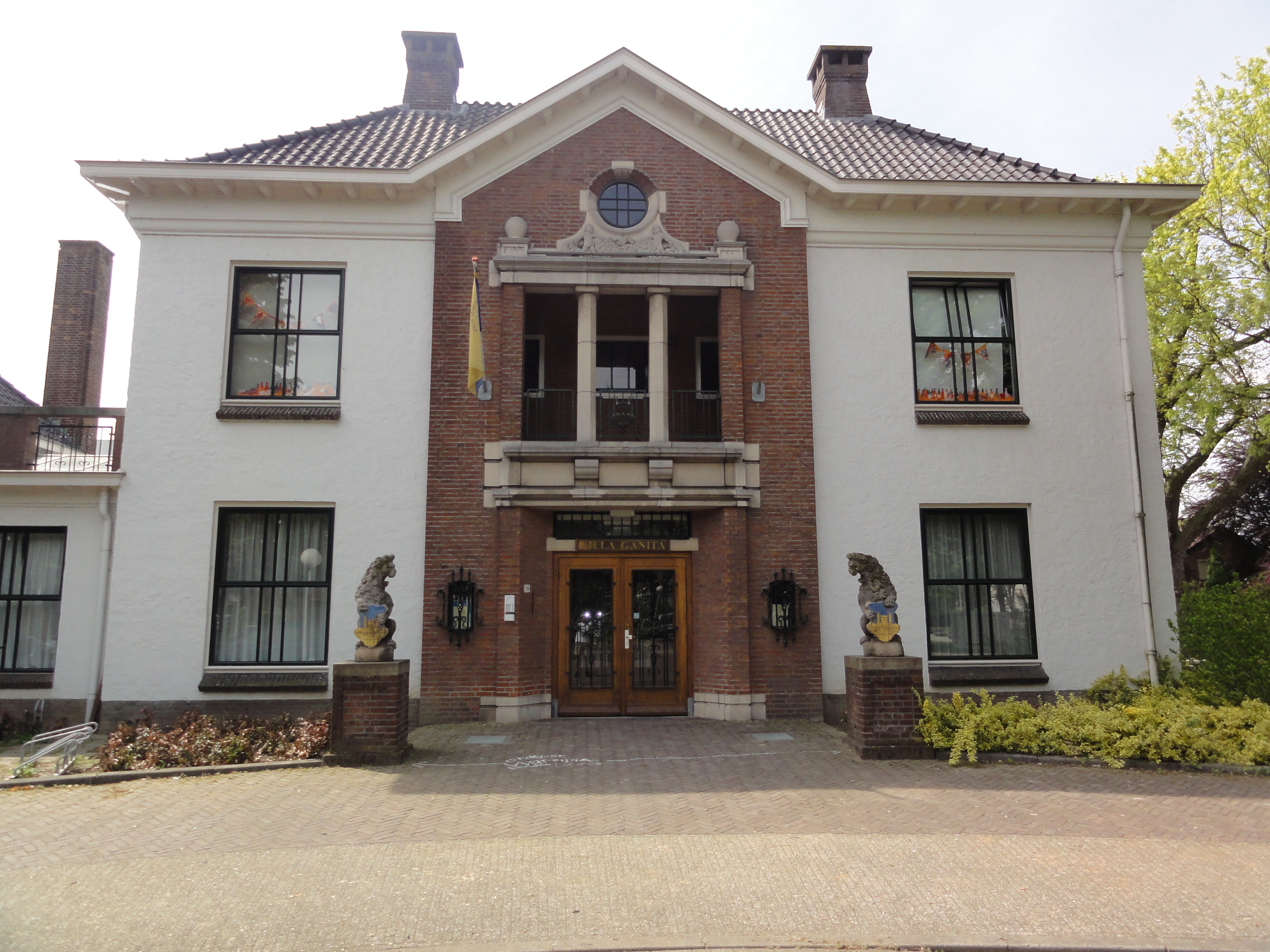
Gendt (Lingewaard) former Town Hall

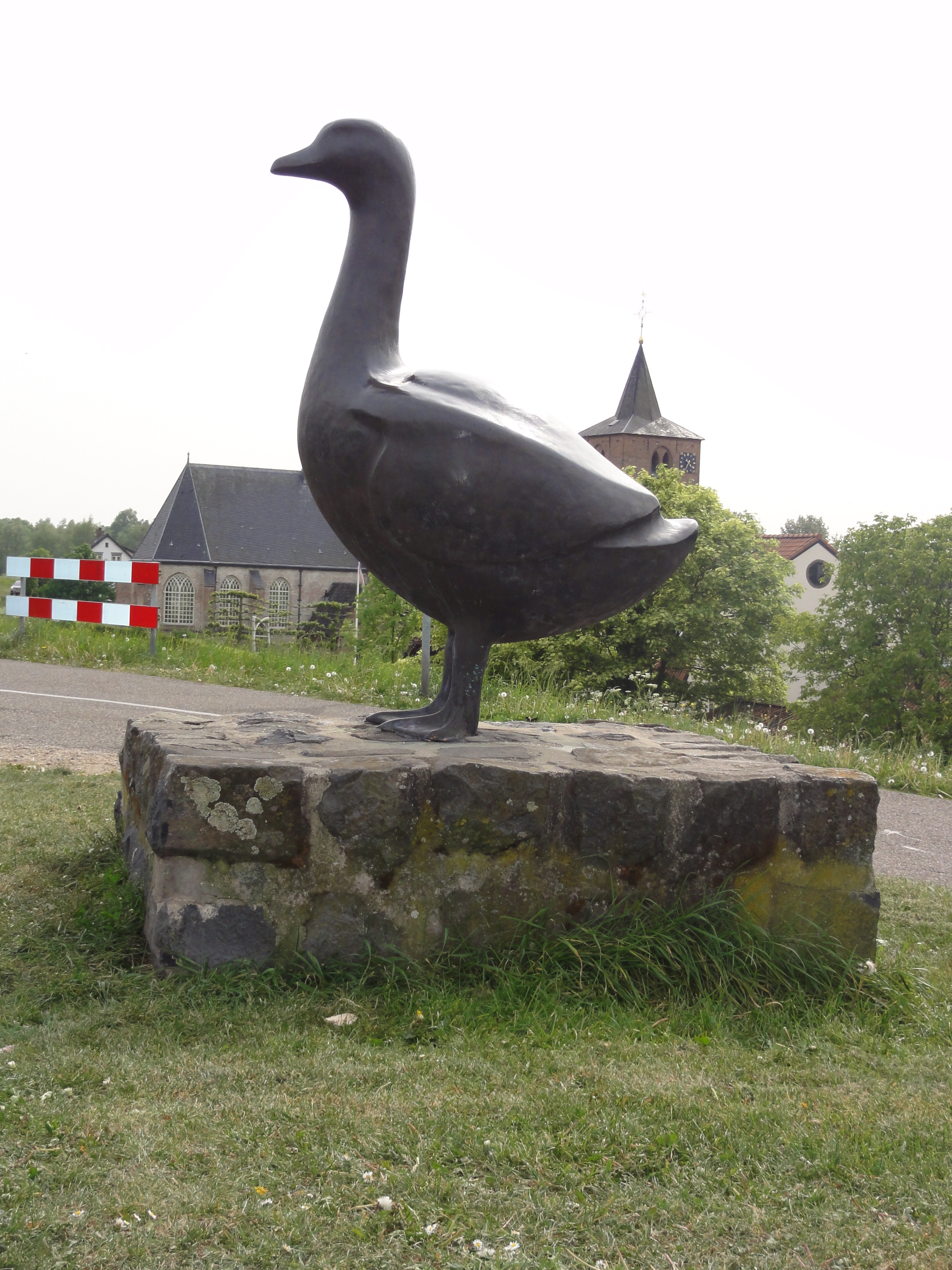
The Gent (statue) of Gendt at the Waaldijk

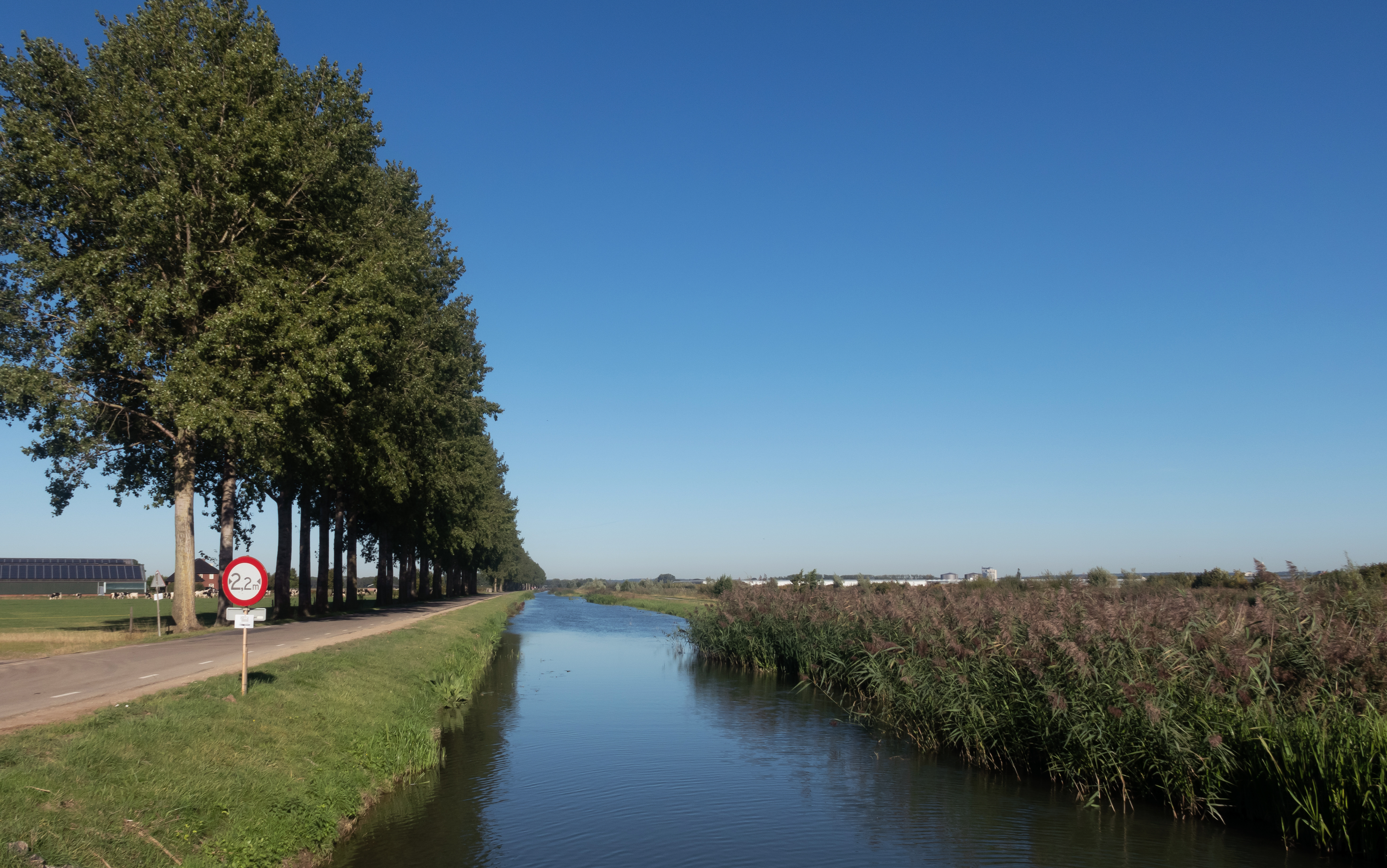
Bergerden, de Linge bij het Verlaten Land Pad

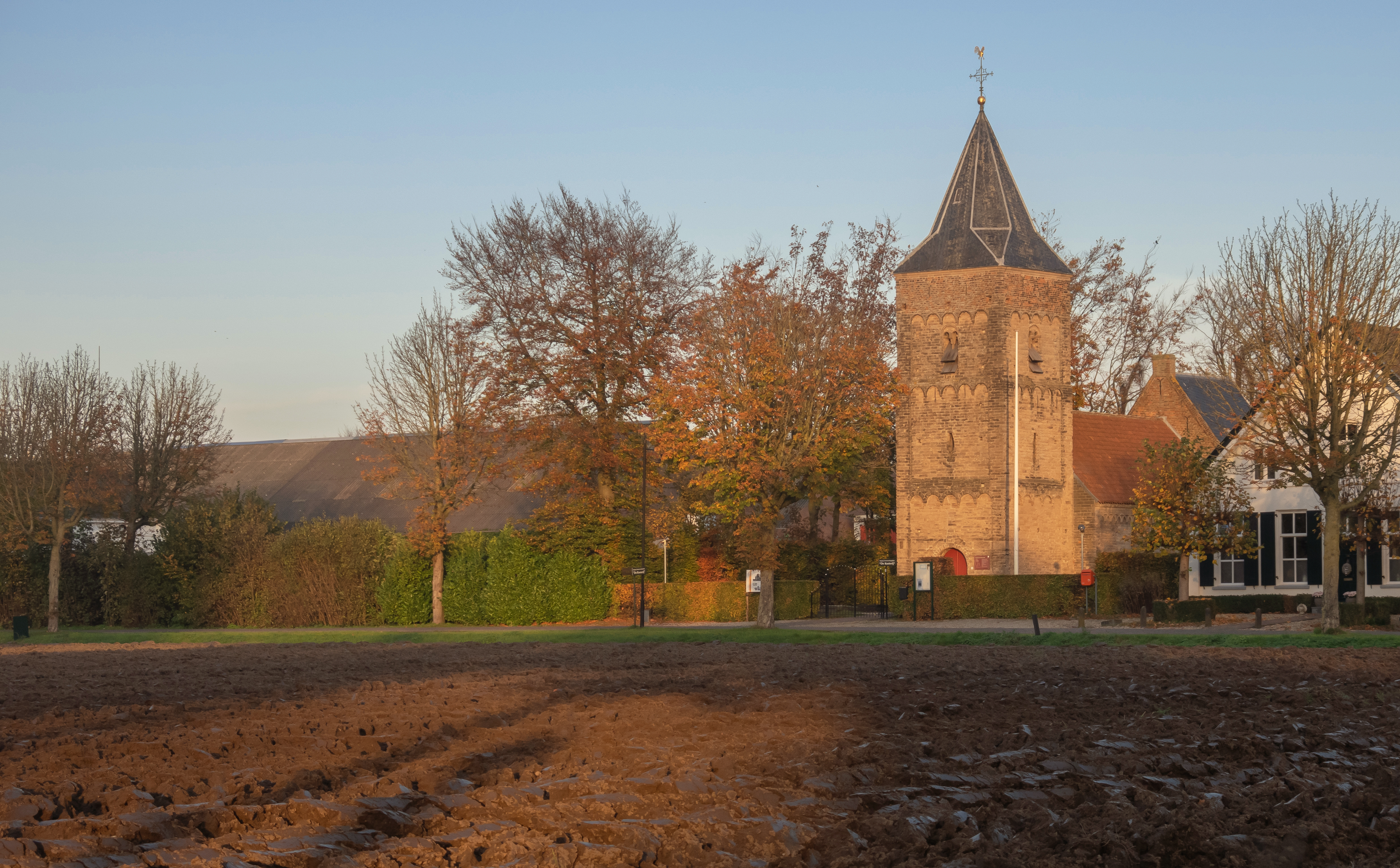
Ressen, reformed church from the Hoeksehofstraat

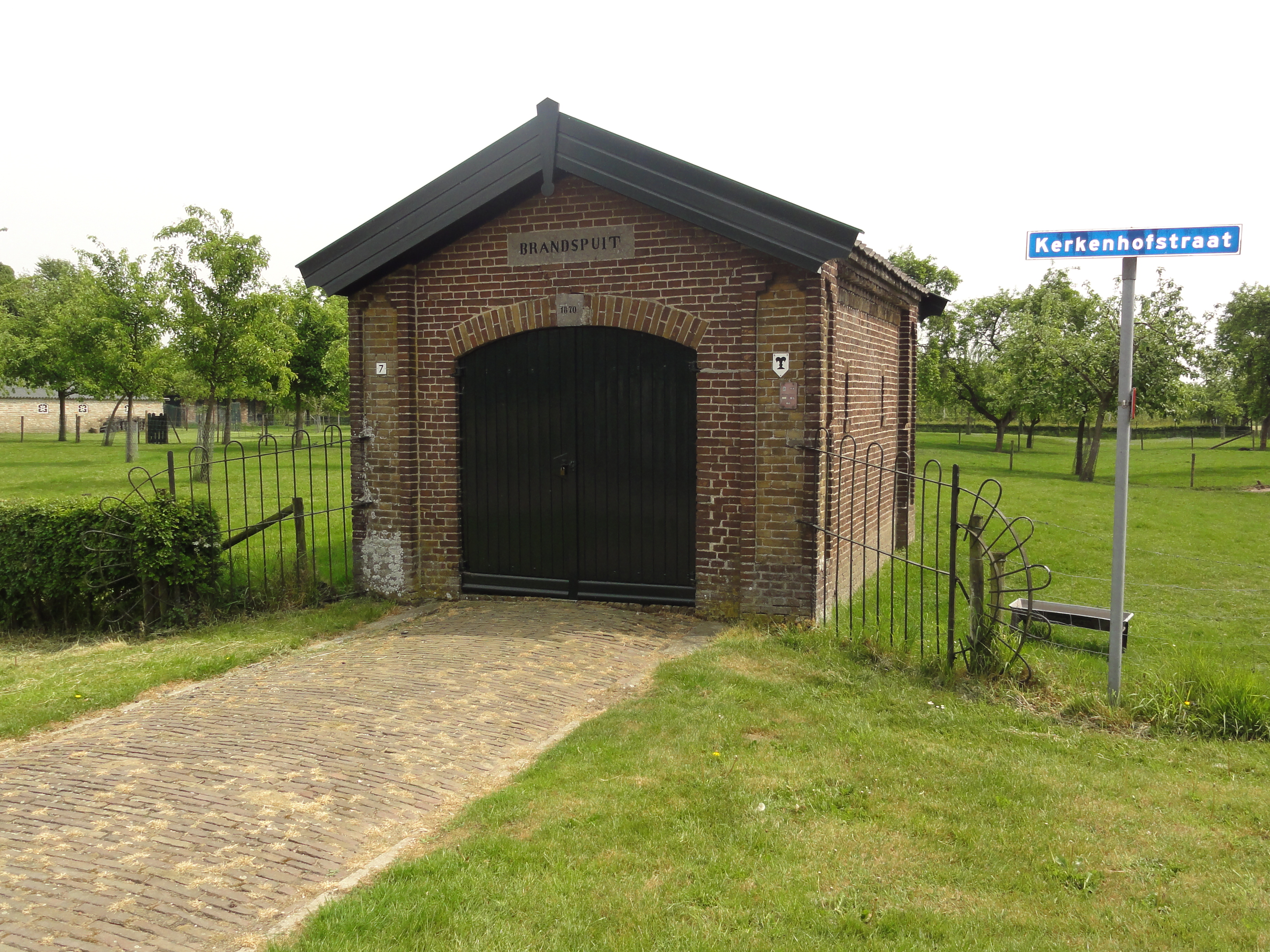
The Brandspuithuisje (monument) in Ressen

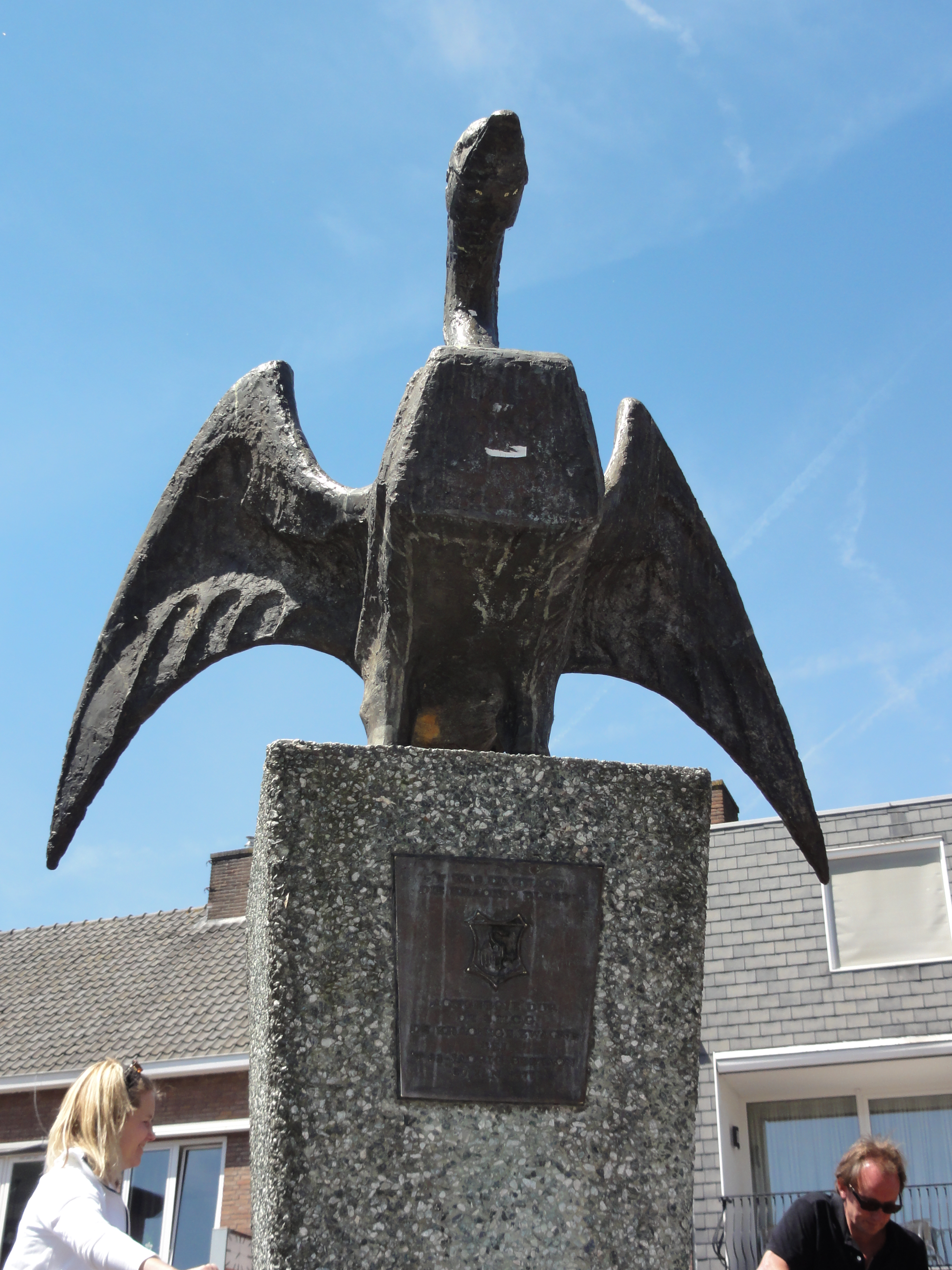
The Swan (statue), town square, Huissen

== Twin town ==
From 2009 to 2014, Lingewaard was twinned with:

- Mizil, Prahova County, Romania
