= Ressen, Nijmegen =

Neighbourhood in Nijmegen, the Netherlands

Coordinates: 51.8870°N 5.8543°E

Ressen is a part of the village with the same name, that was incorporated into the city of Nijmegen in the province of Gelderland, the Netherlands. It is now a Quarter of this city.
