= Loo, Duiven =

Loo
- Village
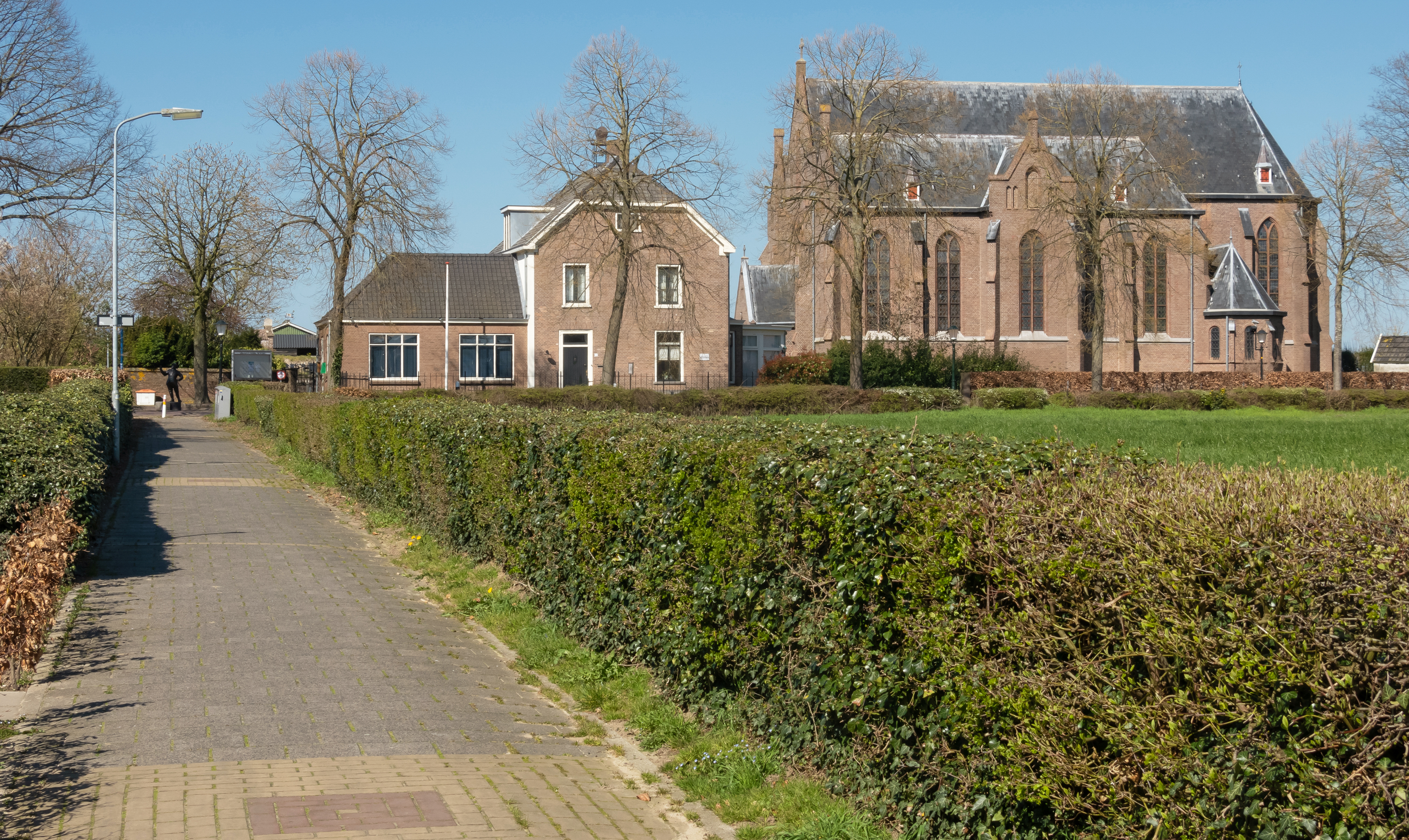
- Sint-Antonius Church

- Location in the Netherlands Loo (Netherlands)
- Coordinates: 51.929°N 5.989°E
- Country: Netherlands
- Province: Gelderland
- Municipality: Duiven; Lingewaard

Area
  - Total: 5.33 km^{2} (2.06 sq mi)
- Elevation: 11 m (36 ft)

Population (2021)
  - Total: 1,135
  - Density: 213/km^{2} (552/sq mi)
- Time zone: UTC+1 (CET)
  - Summer (DST): UTC+2 (CEST)
- Postal code: 6924
- Dialing code: 0316

Loo is a village in the municipality of Duiven in the province of Gelderland, the Netherlands. The village has a ferry connection to Huissen. A couple of houses of Loo are part of Huissen, Lingewaard, because they were on a former river island which used to belong the Duchy of Cleves.

== History ==
It was first mentioned in 1294 or 1295 as Loy, and means forest. The village developed near the Rhine. A chapel was built in the 15th century, and was replaced by the St. Antonius Church in 1875. The havezate Lowaard was first mentioned in 1467. It was extensively rebuilt between 1558 and 1569. In 1742, it was transformed into a farm. In 1840, Loo was home to 242 people.

== Gallery ==
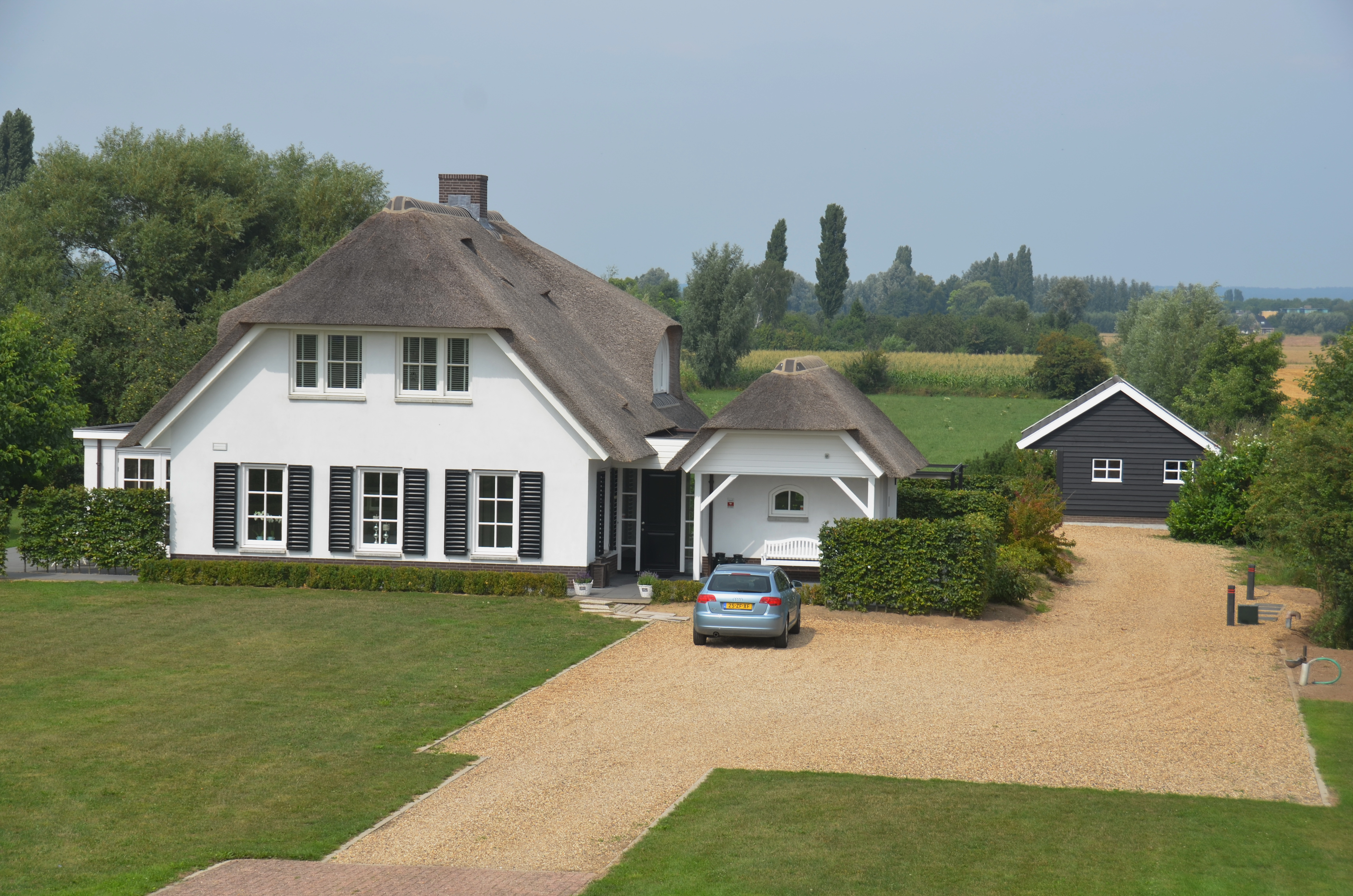
Farm in Loo

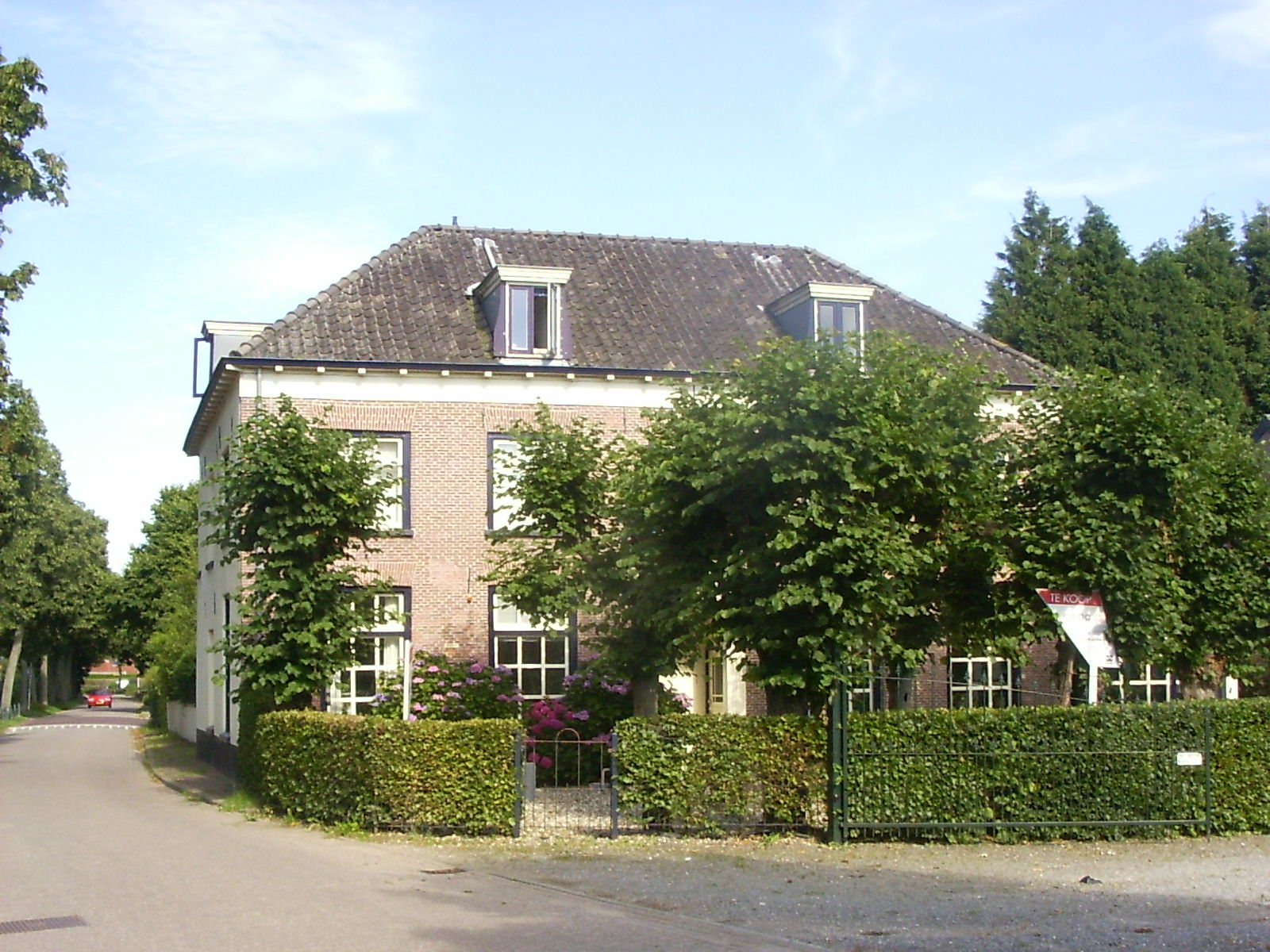
Villa in Loo

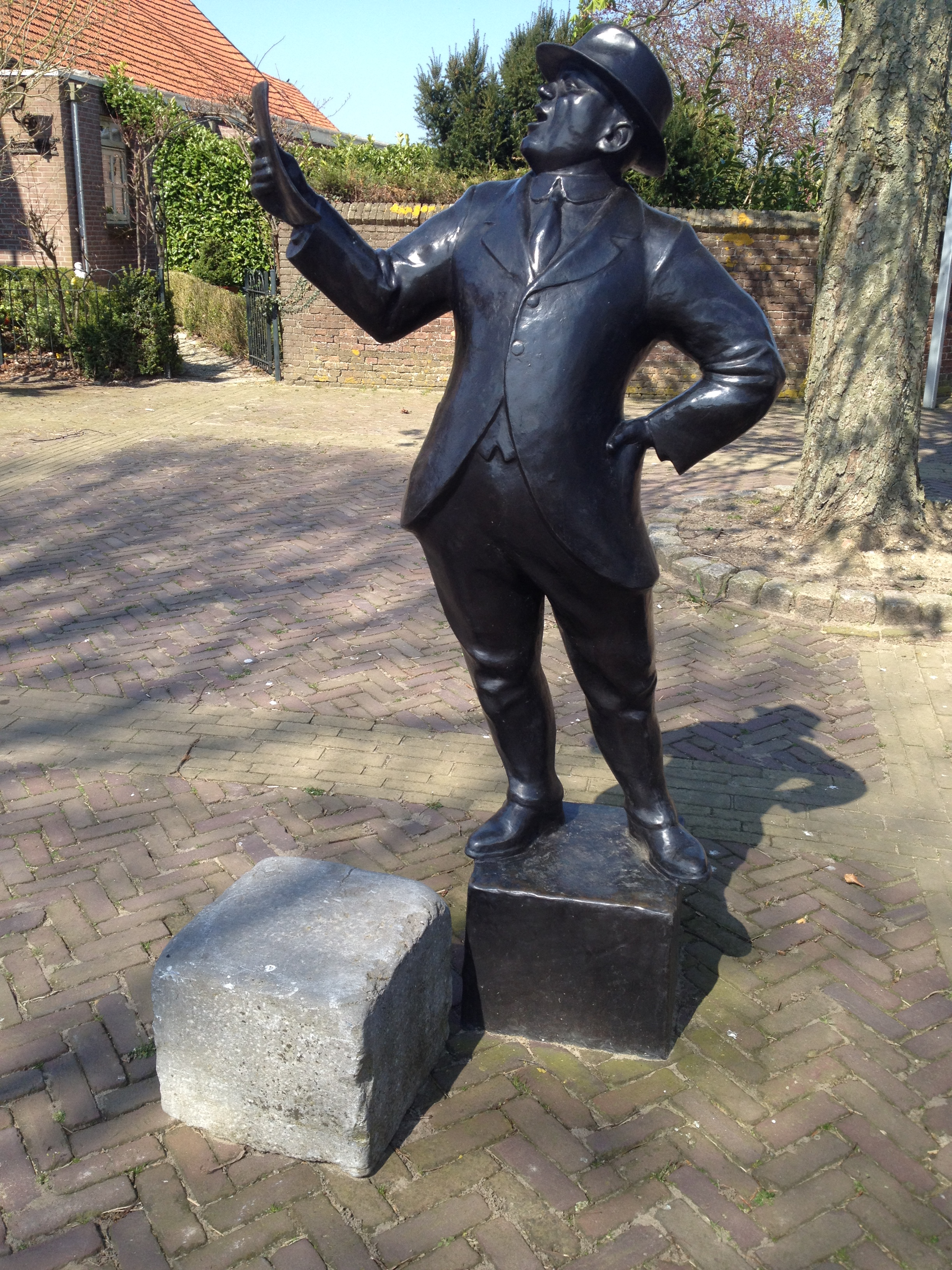
Statue of the village announcer

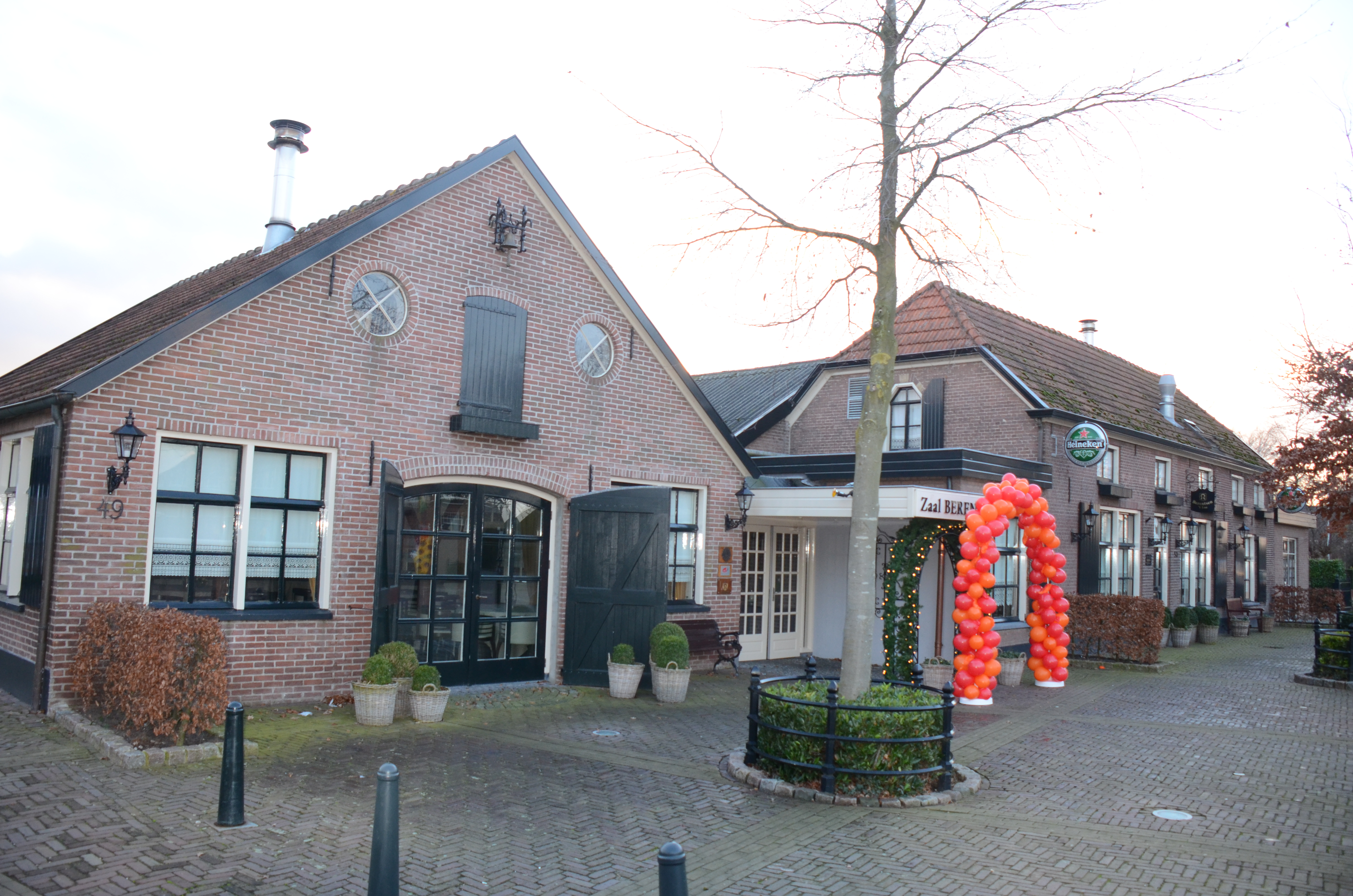
Party centre
