= Ressen =

- Village and neighbourhood
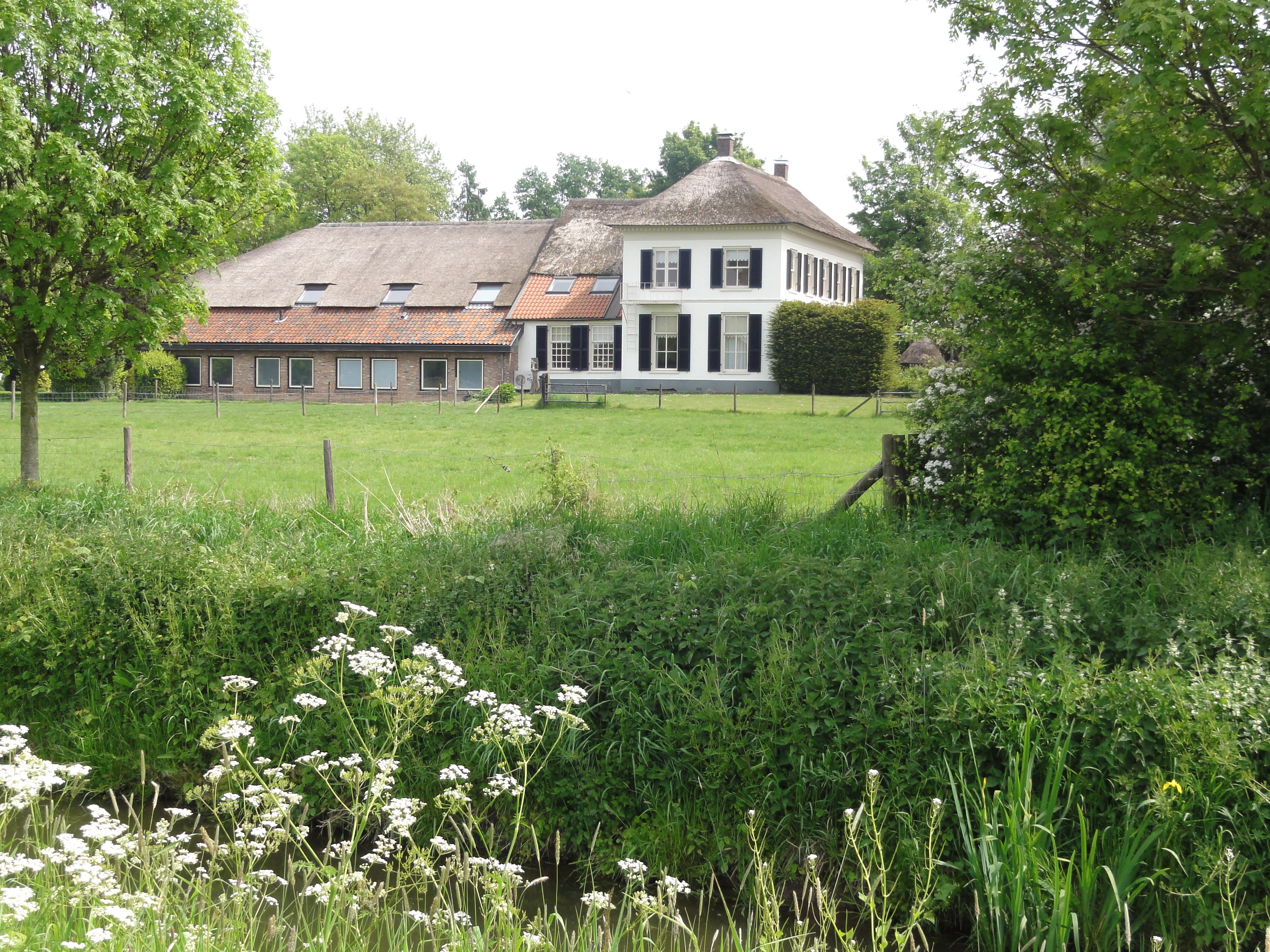
- Het Grote Meer

- Location in the Netherlands Ressen (Netherlands)
- Coordinates: 51.891°N 5.868°E
- Country: Netherlands
- Province: Gelderland
- Municipality: Lingewaard; Nijmegen

Area
  - Total: 1.63 km^{2} (0.63 sq mi)
- Elevation: 10 m (33 ft)

Population (2021)
  - Total: 130
  - Density: 80/km^{2} (210/sq mi)
- Time zone: UTC+1 (CET)
  - Summer (DST): UTC+2 (CEST)
- Postal code: 6684
- Dialing code: 0481

Ressen (Dutch pronunciation: [ˈrɛsə(n)]) is a village in the municipality of Lingewaard in the province of Gelderland, the Netherlands. Part of Ressen is now a neighbourhood of Nijmegen.

== History ==
Ressen was first mentioned in 1150 as Rexnam. The etymology is unknown and may not be Germanic. In 1840, it was home to 200 people. In 1997, a part of Ressen was transferred to Nijmegen for the Waalsprong neighbourhood. For a short period, it had the place name Ressen (Nijmegen), however it has become an integral part of the new neighbourhood.

== Gallery ==
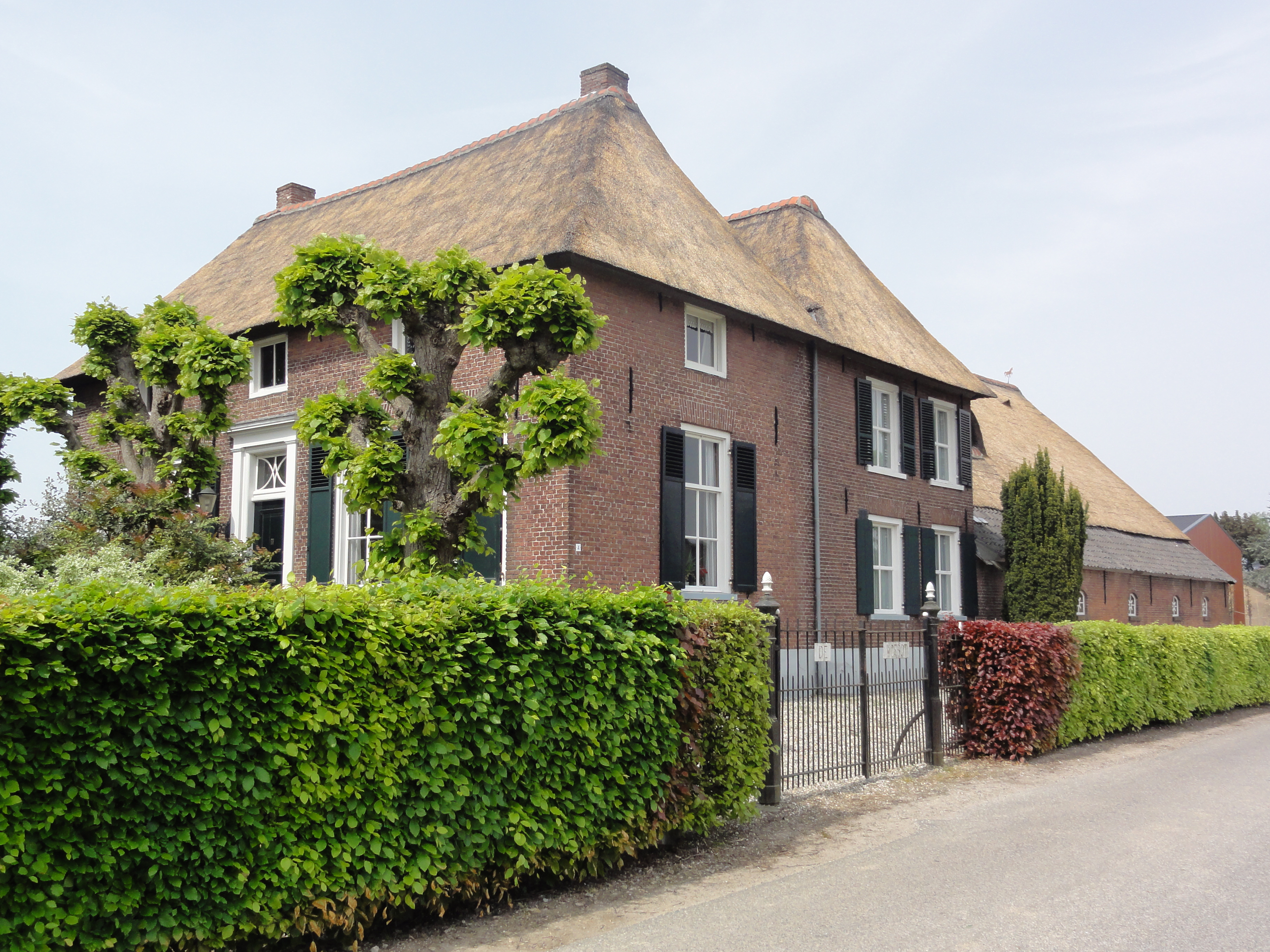
De Woerdt

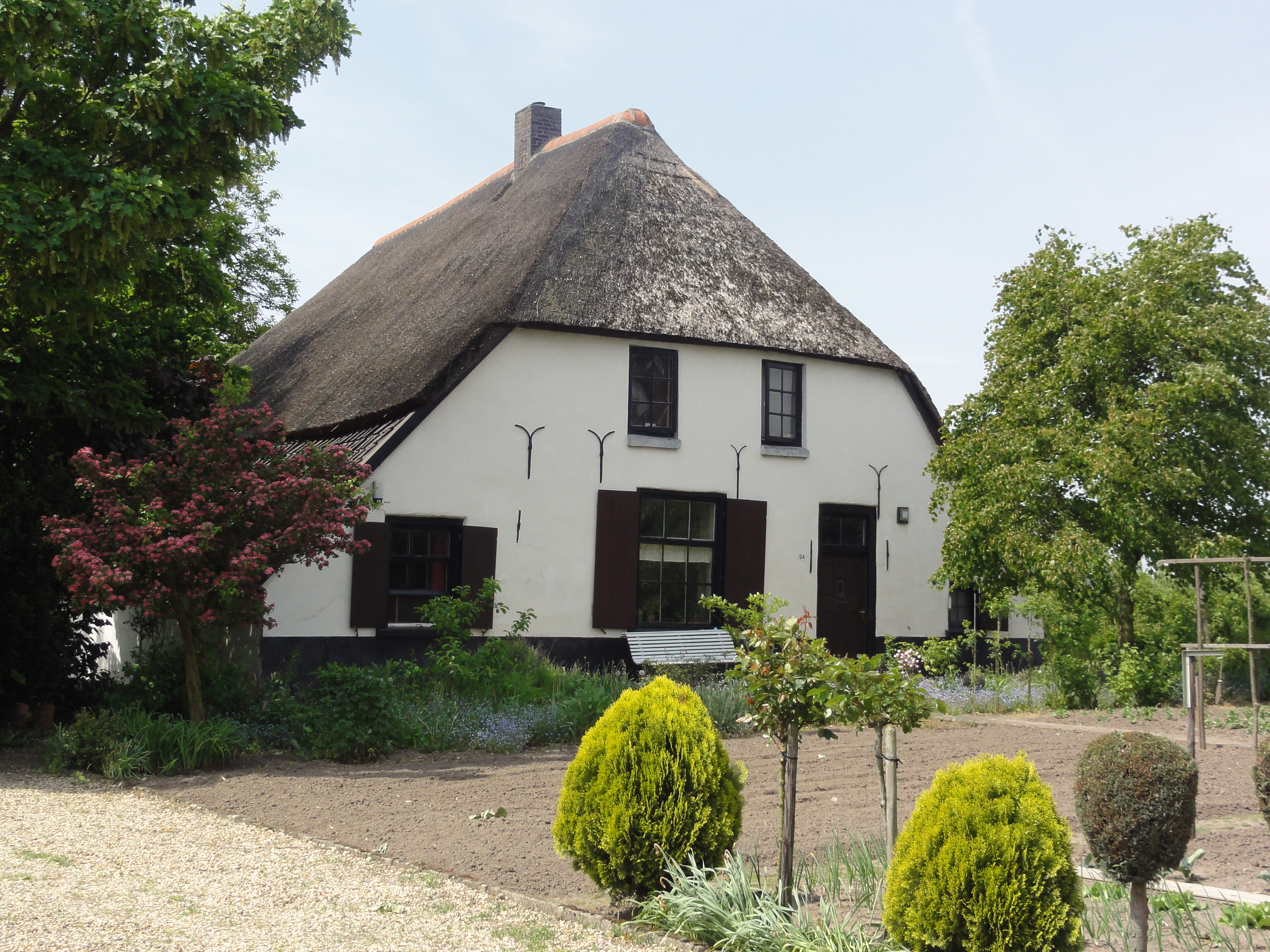
De Kleine Lucht

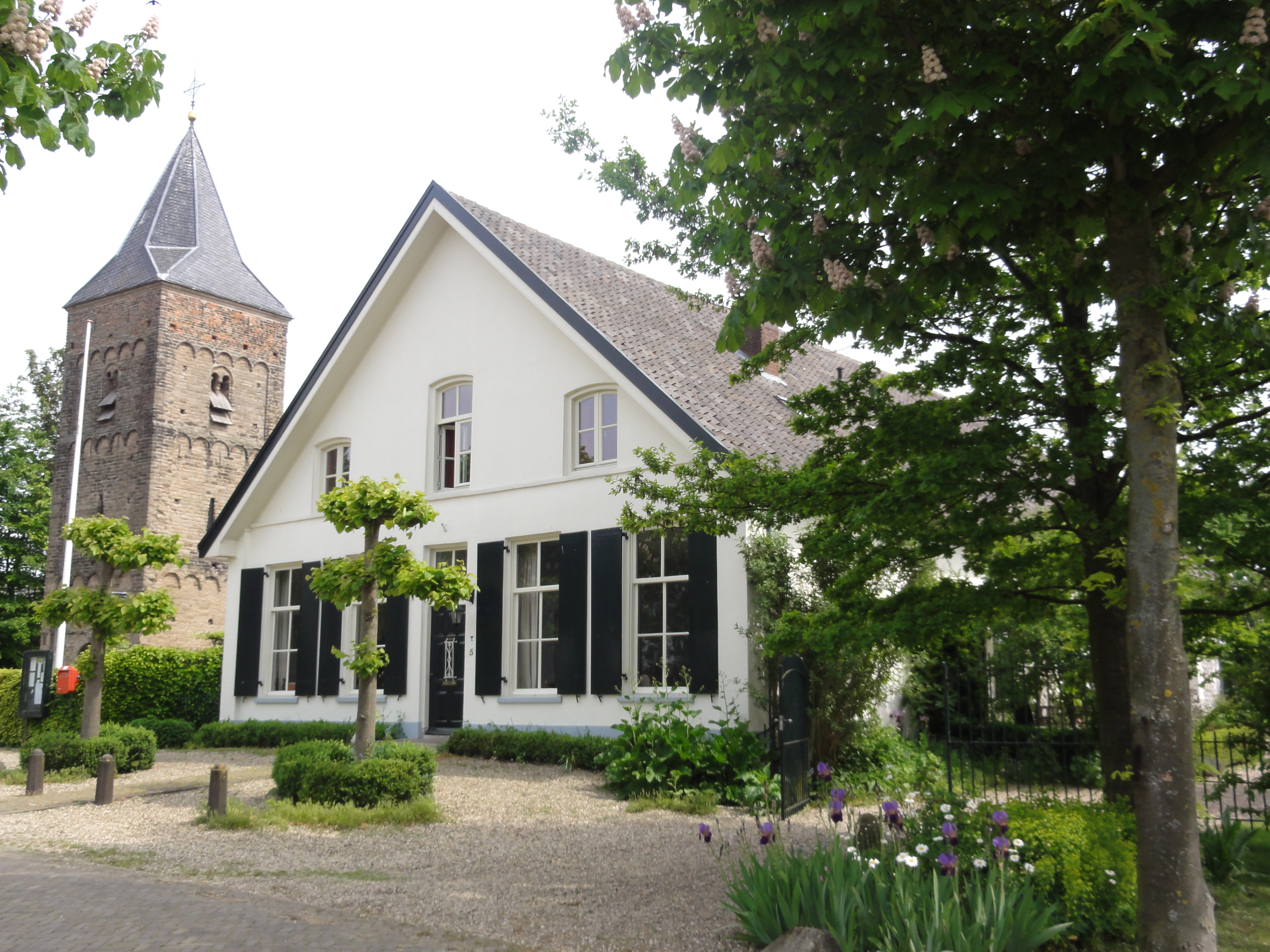
De Kosterij

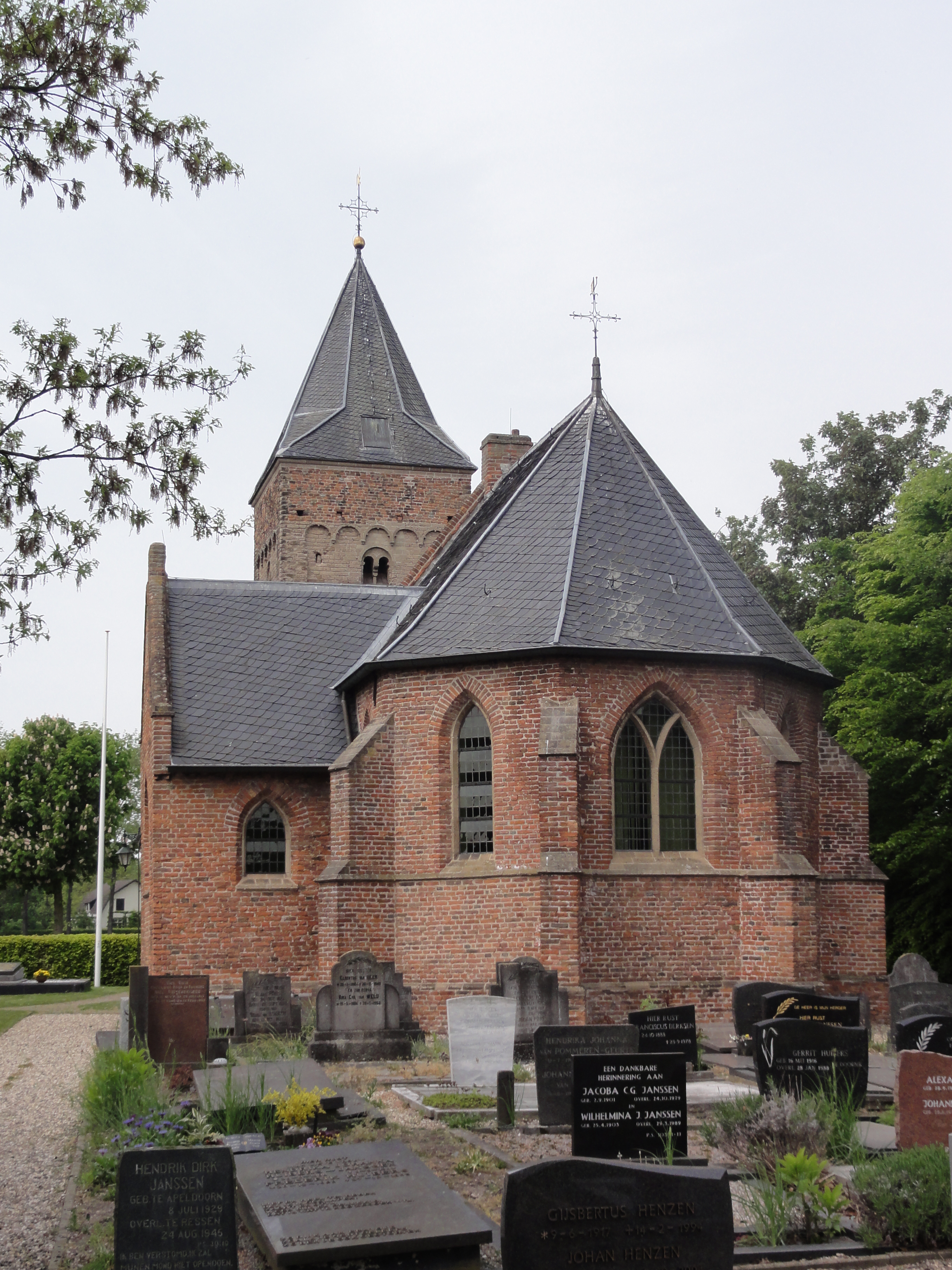
Church

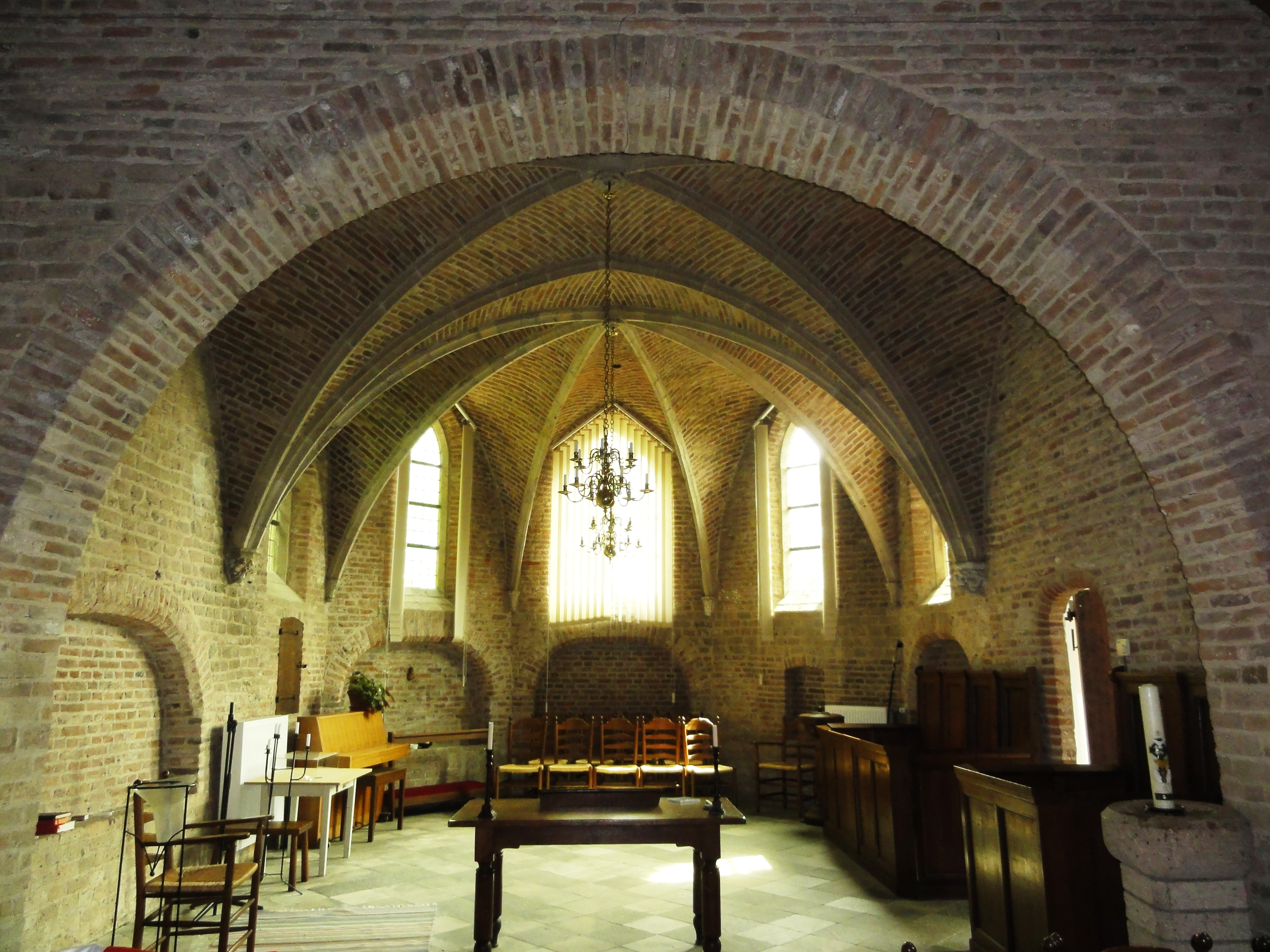
Church

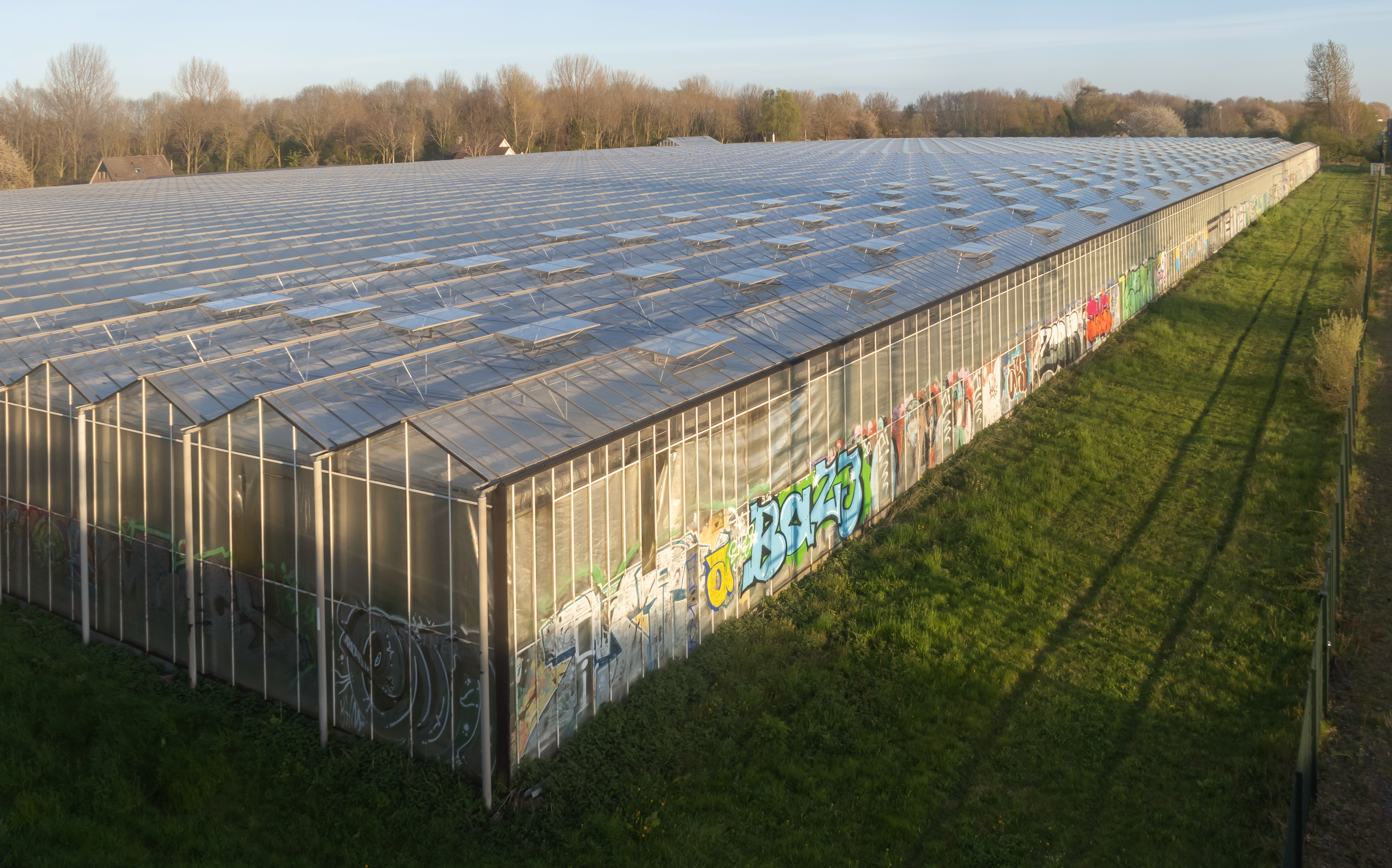
Greenhouses in Ressen
