= Batavia (region) =

Historical and geographical region in the Rhine–Meuse delta

- *Batawjō (reconstructed)
- Betuwe (modern region)
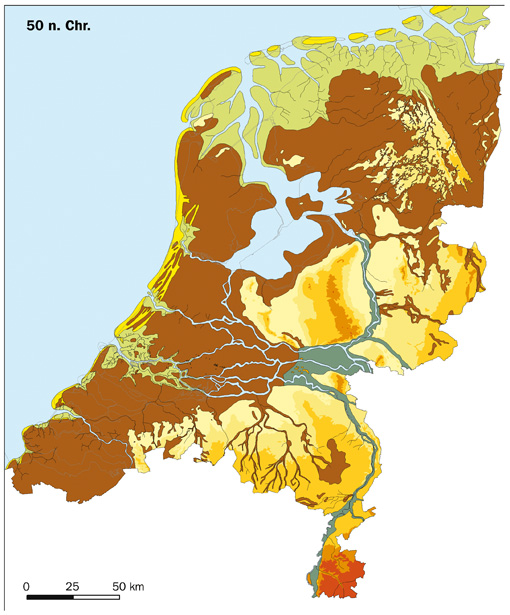
- The Netherlands c. 50 AD. The river island of Batavia can be seen directly below the large round river island in the center. Thin, it stretched from the country's centre to the German border, with roughly a third of its western side fens (indicated in brown) and two thirds of its eastern side river valleys (green). The modern Betuwe region corresponds greatly with it.
- Interactive map of Batavia
- Type: Historical tribal land
- Cultures: Batavi
- Satellite of: Roman Empire (after 80 AD)
- Location: Netherlands
- Region: Gelderland
- Part of: Germania

History
- Event: Batavian Revolt

Batavia (/bəˈteɪviə/ bə-TAY-vee-ə), known in Dutch as Betuwe (Dutch pronunciation: [ˈbeːtyu.ə]), is a historical and geographical region in the Netherlands, composed of large fertile islands in the river delta formed by the waters of the Rhine (Dutch: Rijn) and Meuse (Dutch: Maas) rivers. During the Roman Empire, it was an important frontier region and source of imperial soldiers. Its name is possibly pre-Roman.

The name Batavia derives directly from the Roman term for the region, and is related to the name of the Batavi or Batavians who lived in the area under Roman rule, until the third century AD. Administratively, the modern version, Betuwe, is a part of the Dutch province of Gelderland, and although the rivers and provinces have changed over history it is roughly the same. Today it includes the Waal river on the south and the Lek and Nederrijn in the north (all rivers which start in the delta itself and are branches of the Rhine). Historically, the former municipality of Rijnwaarden belonged to Betuwe, now in Zevenaar, which was cut off by the building of the Pannerdens Kanaal.

A major freight railroad, the Betuweroute, passes through the Betuwe. It was opened in 2007 after many years of controversy.

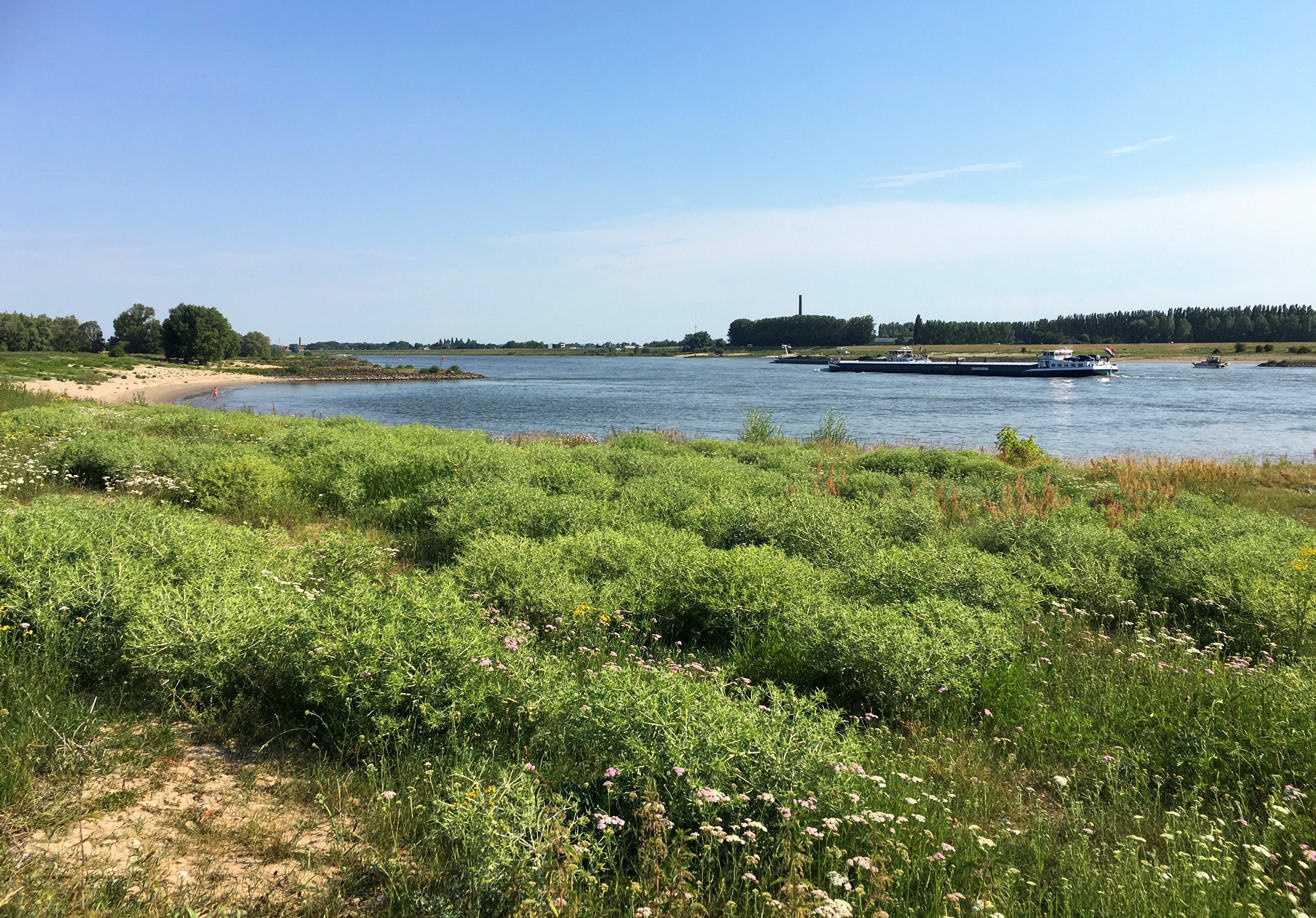
Lingewaard riverscape

Today's Betuwe region is divided into nine municipalities: Lingewaard, Arnhem (southern part), Nijmegen (northern part), Overbetuwe, Neder-Betuwe, Buren, Tiel, Culemborg and West Betuwe. The region is characterised by its many orchards, and has been known for centuries as the fruit garden of the Netherlands.

== Pre-Roman ==
The "Batavian island" in the Rhine river was mentioned by Julius Caesar in his commentary Commentarii de Bello Gallico. The island's easternmost point is at a split in the Rhine, one arm being the Waal and the other the Lower Rhine/Old Rhine (hence the Latin name Insula Batavorum, "Island of the Batavi"). Much later Tacitus wrote that the Batavians who lived there had originally been a part of the Chatti, a tribe in Germany never mentioned by Caesar, who were forced by internal dissension to move to their new home.

Tacitus also reports that before their arrival the area had been "an uninhabited district on the extremity of the coast of Gaul, and also of a neighbouring island, surrounded by the ocean in front, and by the river Rhine in the rear and on either side". In a more detailed description he writes:

The island of the Batavi was the appointed rendezvous because of its easy landing-places, and its convenience for receiving the army and carrying the war across the river. For the Rhine after flowing continuously in a single channel or encircling merely insignificant islands, divides itself, so to say, where the Batavian territory begins, into two rivers, retaining its name and the rapidity of its course in the stream which washes Germany, till it mingles with the ocean. On the Gallic bank, its flow is broader and gentler; it is called by an altered name, the Vahal, by the inhabitants of its shore. Soon that name too is changed for the Mosa river, through whose vast mouth it empties itself into the same ocean.

Modern archaeologists disagree with Tacitus, noting that that island had a pre-Roman and pre-Germanic population, apparently already called the Batavians. Caesar indeed had not only implied the existence of pre-Roman Batavians, but also mentioned that the Belgic Menapii of the Flemish coast had settlements stretching as far as the beginning of the delta, near the modern border with Germany.

== Roman era ==
During the Roman Empire there was a civitas of the Batavians, a Germanic tribe. It was described as a large island between rivers in the Rhine-Meuse delta, roughly equivalent to modern Betuwe. The Batavians shared the island with the Germanic Canninefates, to their west near the coast. The Romans founded Nijmegen during the first century B.C., atop a military encampment they had established there.

The name Batavia was also mentioned by Pliny the Elder, and it played a role in the account by Tacitus of the Germanic uprising of 68. He said that "In the Rhine itself, nearly 100 miles [160 kilometres] in length, Batavia is the most famous island of the Batavi and the Canninefates".

Its later Roman history is attested by Ammianus Marcellinus, who mentions the Frankish Salians as a people living there. Zosimus is the only classical author who claims that they had first crossed the Rhine during the Roman upheavals and subsequent Germanic breakthrough in 260 AD. Both authors agree that the Salians were pushed south from Batavia into Toxandria.

== Medieval ==
In the Carolingian and Ottonian periods in the early Middle Ages, Batavia, called Batua by the Franks, was an example of a Frankish gau that was based on much older Roman pagi. Several counts are recorded as having their counties there, and it is mentioned in the treaties such as the Treaty of Meerssen, that divided up Europe among the different Frankish kingdoms.

Later, it was mainly absorbed into the newer county of Guelders which had become established to the southeast.

== Renaissance ==
In the Renaissance, the Dutch wanted to rediscover their pre-medieval Batavi culture and history. This common history raised Batavi to the status of cultural ancestors to all Dutch people (see The Batavian revival). They occasionally called themselves, or their things (Batavia), Batavians, resulting even in a short-lived Batavian Republic. The name Batavia was also taken to the colonies such as the Dutch East Indies, where they renamed the city of Jayakarta to become Batavia from 1619 until about 1942, when its name was changed to Djakarta (short for the former name Jayakarta, later respelt Jakarta; see: History of Jakarta). The name was also used in Suriname, where they founded Batavia, Suriname, and in the United States where the Holland Land Company founded the city and the town of Batavia, New York. This name spread further west in the United States to such places as Batavia, Illinois, near Chicago, and Batavia, Ohio.

When the Pannerdens Kanaal was dug between 1701 and 1709, the easternmost tip of the Betuwe (including the towns of Pannerden and Lobith) was cut off from the rest of the region.

== 20th century ==
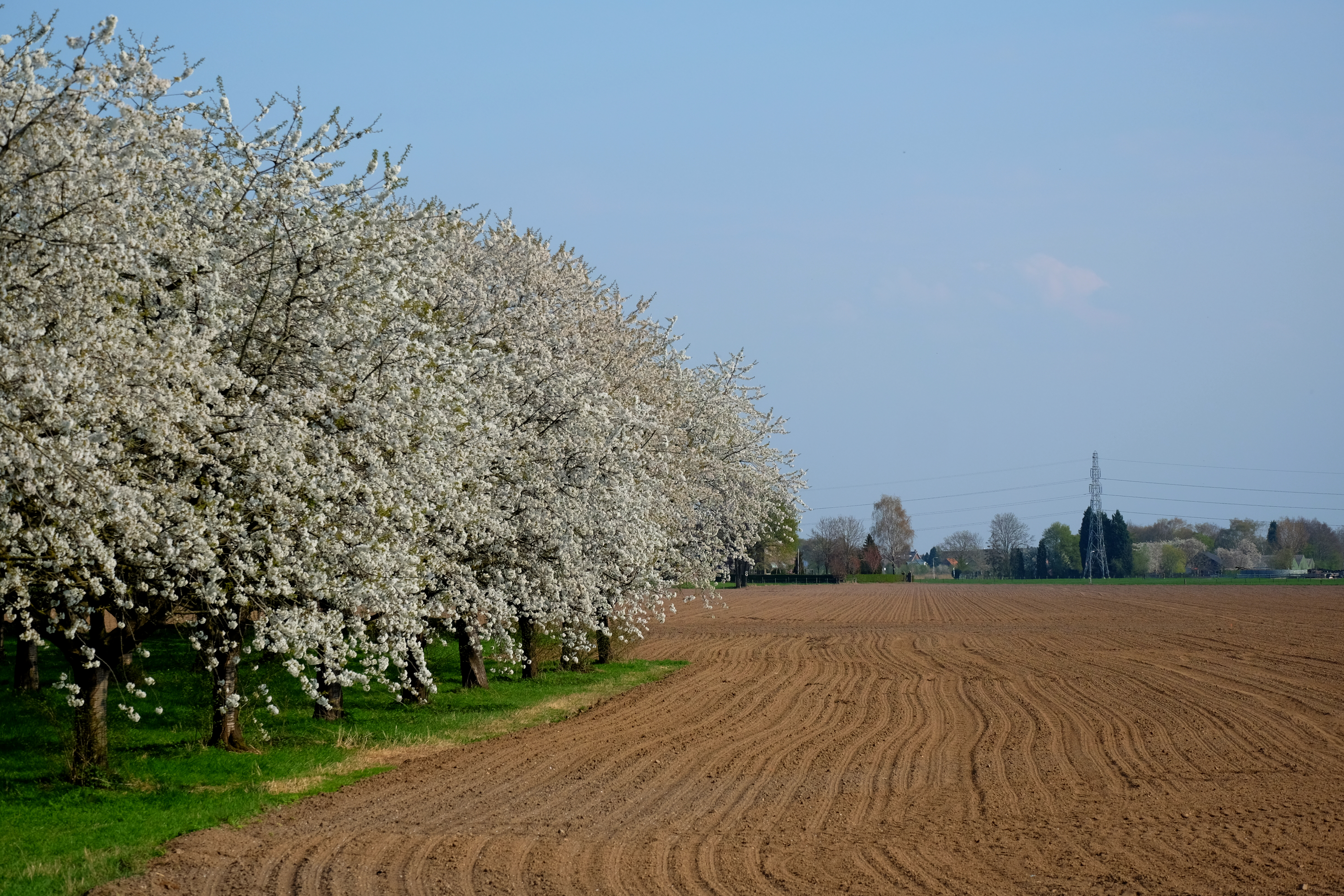
A landscape in today's Betuwe, shaped for centuries by fruit orchards

In the aftermath of the failed allied Operation Market Garden, the Germans attempted to retake the Allied gains during the Battle of the Nijmegen salient but were unsuccessful.

In the period 1940-1990, land consolidation took place throughout the area. This made further economies of scale and departmentalisation in fruit production possible.

In 1995, a large part of this area had to be evacuated because the rivers threatened to overflow. They did not, but the incident raised the debate again about whether to reinforce the dikes.
