= Pannerdens Kanaal =

Canal in the Netherlands

Coordinates: 51°54′03″N 6°00′56″E

The Pannerdens Kanaal (Pannerden Canal) is a canal in the Netherlands that was dredged between 1701 and 1709 to cut off a large, shallow bend of the river Rhine for improving river traffic and water regulation.

The canal begins at the Pannerdensche Kop, where the Boven-Rijn splits into the Waal and the Pannerdensch Kanaal. It flows past the towns of Pannerden (right bank), which gives the canal its name, and Angeren (left bank) and continues to the Nederrijn at Angeren, where the Pannerdensch Kanaal becomes the Nederrijn. The former upper course of the Rhine, cut off when the Pannerdensch Kanaal was constructed, survives as the Oude Rijn.

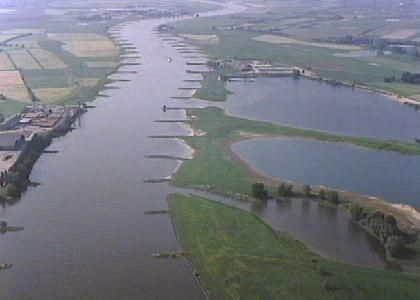
