= Battle of the Nijmegen salient =

Battle in the Netherlands during WW2

- Part of the Western Front of World War II
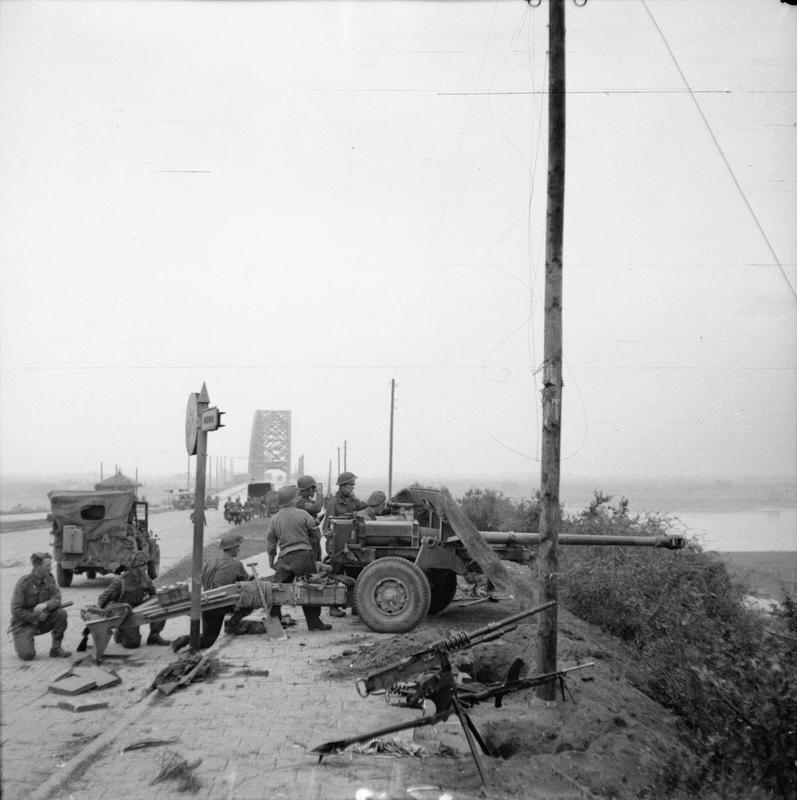
- A British 17-pounder anti tank gun on the road embankment South of the Nijmegen road bridge
Date	30 September – 8 October 1944
Location	Betuwe, Netherlands 51°55′N 5°51′E
Result	Allied victory

Belligerents
United Kingdom; United States	Germany

Commanders and leaders
(United Kingdom) Bernard Montgomery (United Kingdom) Ivor Thomas	(Nazi Germany) Walther Model (Nazi Germany) Wilhelm Bittrich

Units involved
(United Kingdom): XXX Corps	(Nazi Germany): II SS Panzer Korps Supported by; II Fallschirmkorps; XII SS Corps

The Battle of the Nijmegen salient or the Defence of the Nijmegen bridgehead was a series of engagements that took place in the Netherlands during World War II between 30 September and 8 October 1944. The battle occurred in the aftermath of Operation Market Garden, a failed attempt by the Allies to cut off German forces in the Netherlands and end the war quickly.

Walter Model who commanded German forces during Market Garden attempted to regain the Nijmegen salient which had been seized by the allies to contain the offensive and drive them off the Betuwe, which became known as 'the Island'. Wilhelm Bittrich led the II SS Panzer Korps in the counter-offensive, in particular with the aim of retaking Nijmegen and its bridges. German forces were not prepared to make assaults and many units were without tank support. The 21st Army Group (General Bernard Montgomery) commanded the area from Southern Holland to the North sea. British forces on the island were led by General Ivor Thomas who commanded an ad hoc force assembled to defend the area. Despite losing some ground, the British managed to repel all the attacks. British troops then counter-attacked from 4 October, and managed to recapture all of the lost ground and gained a number of villages. The British were then reinforced by the US 101st Airborne Division and further German efforts were again defeated. When the Arnhem road bridge was destroyed by US medium bombers on 7 October, sporadic fighting continued for a further three days but the Germans called off the attack. The Germans suffered many casualties in infantry and tanks. The 21st Army Group, already committed to the defence of the salient, sent resources for the Battle of the Scheldt.

== Background ==
In September 1944, the Allies had launched Operation Market Garden, an offensive from the Dutch-Belgian border across the south of the Netherlands through Eindhoven and Nijmegen toward the Rhine bridge at Arnhem. The goal was to cross the Rhine and bypass the Siegfried Line in preparation for the final drive towards Berlin but also to cut off the Germans still in the Netherlands. Allied airborne troops managed to take the bridges but delays resulted in the defeat in the Battle of Arnhem. The advance stopped south of the Nederrijn, resulting in a narrow salient that ran from the north of Belgium across the south-east of the Netherlands, and was vulnerable to attack. (Note: The Nederrijn ("Nether Rhine") refers to the section of the Lower Rhine (Dutch: Beneden-Rijn; German: Niederrhein) between the Pannerdens Kanaal (dug in 1701–1709) near Arnhem, and the Lek near Wijk bij Duurstede.) The area between the Rhine and Waal rivers became the new front line on the Betuwe, also known as 'the island' to the allies.

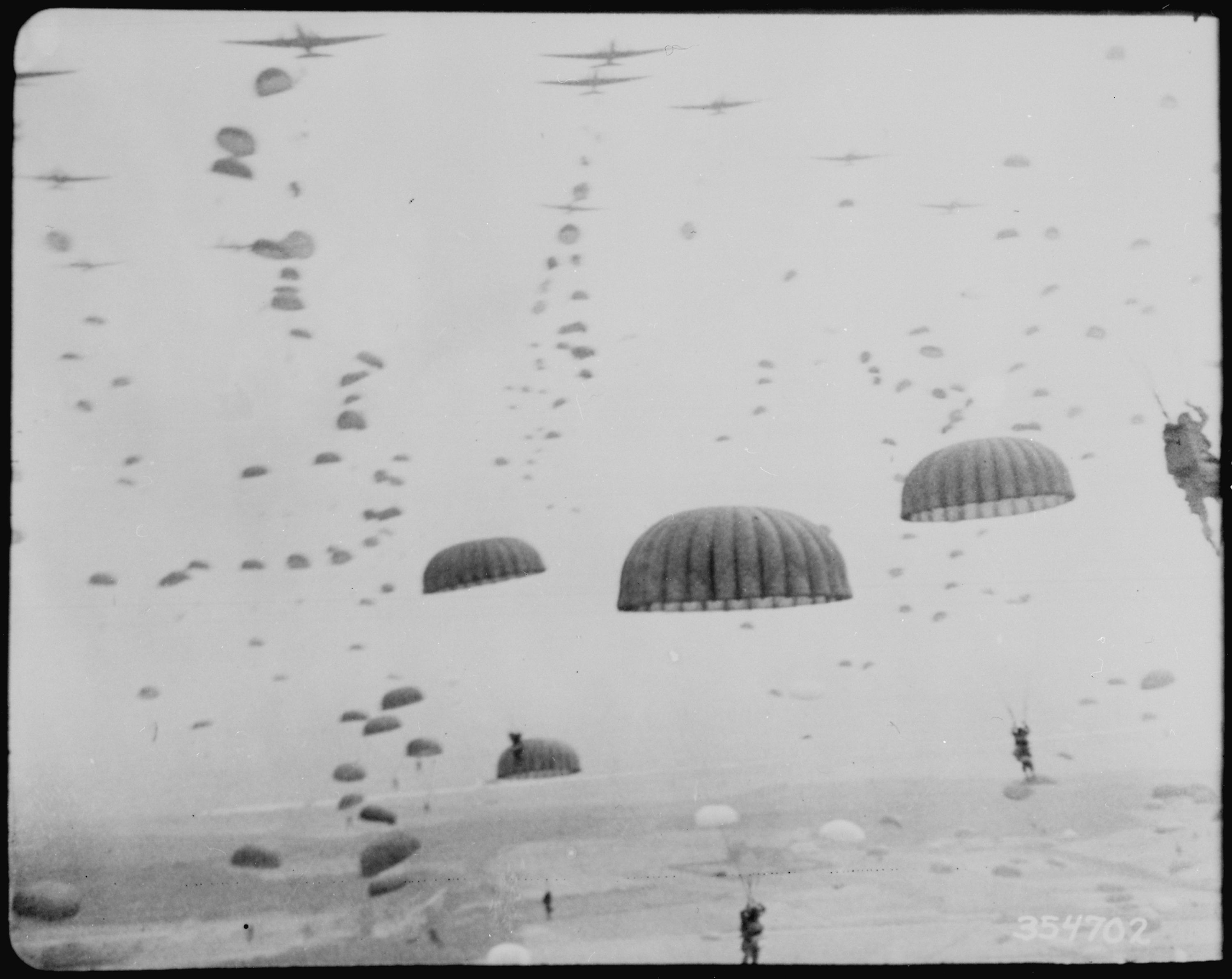
Paratroopers of 1st Allied Airborne Army drop overhead during Operation Market Garden

During the latter stages of Market Garden, the British 43rd Wessex Division had moved up to relieve the Guards Armoured Division. Elements of the 43rd took Oosterhout from the Germans on 22 September and then gained Opheusden and Dodewaard the following day, but they were unable to push the frontline any further. The Household cavalry managed to reach the Polish Parachute Brigade at Driel following which 4th Dorsets attempted to reinforce 1st Airborne Division but suffered many losses after crossing the river. A conference had already been held at Valburg and a decision was made that the 1st Airborne should be evacuated. This was achieved at night in Operation Berlin on 25/26 September. With the completion of the evacuation, Thomas was made responsible for the defence of The Island. The 5th Guards Armoured Brigade and 8th Armoured Brigade as well as the 69th Infantry Brigade were placed under his command. In reserve was the 151st Infantry Brigade and 231st Infantry Brigade from 50th Northumbrian Division which had come up in support.

The German bridgehead on The Island by this time initially encompassed the villages of Elden, Elst, Huissen and Bemmel. Elst was lost on 25 September after several days of bitter street fighting with troops from the 43rd Wessex Division. The following day the Germans crossed the Rhine in battalion strength and managed to gain a small bridgehead at Randwijk. This was only lightly held by the 43rd (Wessex) Reconnaissance Regiment troops but on seeing the Germans they were soon reinforced by the Hampshires and Somersets with additional support from tanks of 8th Armoured Brigade. The British intention was to take the dyke road near Randwijk which was used by the Germans for ferry crossings. Despite interference from the Luftwaffe, the British were able to force the Germans out after a final gun battle in the village church, the Hampshires took 150 prisoners. The German bridgehead south of the Nederrijn was destroyed. On the same day, the 69th Infantry Brigade launched an attack to secure the area in front of them – Bemmel was captured by the 5th East Yorkshire Regiment. The following day the Green Howards secured the area of Heuvel, but were unable to take Baal and Haalderen due to German troops in the brickworks that were able to call in heavy artillery fire including Nebelwerfer fire.

The German High Command (Generalfeldmarschall Walther Model) in command of Heeresgruppe B, regarded the allied bridgehead north of the Waal River as a severe threat. They feared that the Allies could still use the area as a springboard to the north to cut off the 15th Army in the western part of Holland and threaten the plains of north-west Germany. Hitler, in a special Führer Directive issued on 25 September, had ordered the destruction of the allies in the Nijmegen–Arnhem area. For Model, it was imperative to recapture the ground they had lost in the Betuwe by acting quickly, before the Allied front had settled. Model ordered Obergruppenführer Wilhelm Bittrich (II SS-Panzer Corps) to destroy the Allies between the Nederrijn and Waal by coordinated armour and infantry attacks from the north and east. With the 10th SS Panzer Division already engaged on The Island, Bittrich was given the 9th Panzer Division and the 116th Panzer Division for the counter-attack. These latter formations were brought up from the Battle of Aachen, where the US First Army had penetrated the Siegfried Line. Upon arrival the 9th Panzer Division took over command of battlegroups Knaust and Bruhn, ad hoc formations composed of reserve and depot infantry, which had engaged the British 1st Airborne Division. The other armoured formation in the Arnhem area, the 9th SS Panzer Division Hohenstaufen was pulled out of the line for a move to Paderborn for rest and refitting.

=== German objectives ===
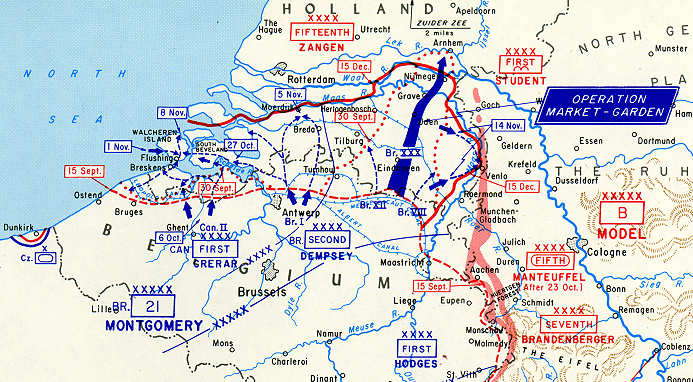
Plan of Operation Market Garden and front lines in October–November 1944

To ensure proper coordination of the counterattack, all German units on The Island were placed under command of Bittrich's II SS Panzer Korps to devote his attention exclusively to the conduct of the upcoming operation. In addition, the headquarters of XII SS Corps now assumed command over all German forces west of Arnhem on 27 September.

Three Army Corps were involved: the II Fallschirmjäger Korps to the east of Nijmegen, the II SS Panzer Korps on the Island and the XII SS korps. The latter operated from the north bank of the Nederrijn west of Arnhem and the south bank near Kesteren and Ochten, the area where the two rivers the Nederrijn and Waal approached to within a few miles of each other. These three army Corps were to launch coordinated attacks that intended to cut off the Allied concentration at Nijmegen through the south of the Waal and Nijmegen, from Groesbeek to the Maas-Waal Canal. II Fallschirm Korps would launch a converging attack north of the Waal against the Nijmegen bridgehead from the east and west of II SS Panzer and XII SS korps respectively. There was also a plan to destroy the Nijmegen road bridge in the hope that it would hamper Allied supplies and reinforcements. Hitler on the news of the failure of its destruction during its capture by the allies ordered an inquiry.

=== Allied objectives ===
The Allies led by Dwight Eisenhower were already having issues with supply lines becoming stretched, and were in need of supplies for the coming winter. The Scheldt estuary needed to be cleared, so that the huge port of Antwerp could be opened to Allied shipping, making supplies easier to get to the new stabilised front line. This had been delayed, not just by Market Garden, but because Boulogne, Calais and Cap Griz Nez remained in German hands, besieged by the First Canadian Army. By the time Market Garden was over, Calais and Cap Gris Nez still hadn't fallen.

On 1 October, Calais and Cap Griz Nez finally fell, but the damage to the port was severe, and the facilities were not available for some time, so Allied eyes lay firmly on Antwerp. The bulk of the 21st Army Group (mainly 1st Canadian army) now concentrated its efforts on taking the Scheldt, Walcheren and Westkapelle. In addition, the thin salient of Market Garden East and West needed to be expanded. These being earmarked in support of the Scheldt operation, and to tie down the Germans in the region.

== Preparation ==
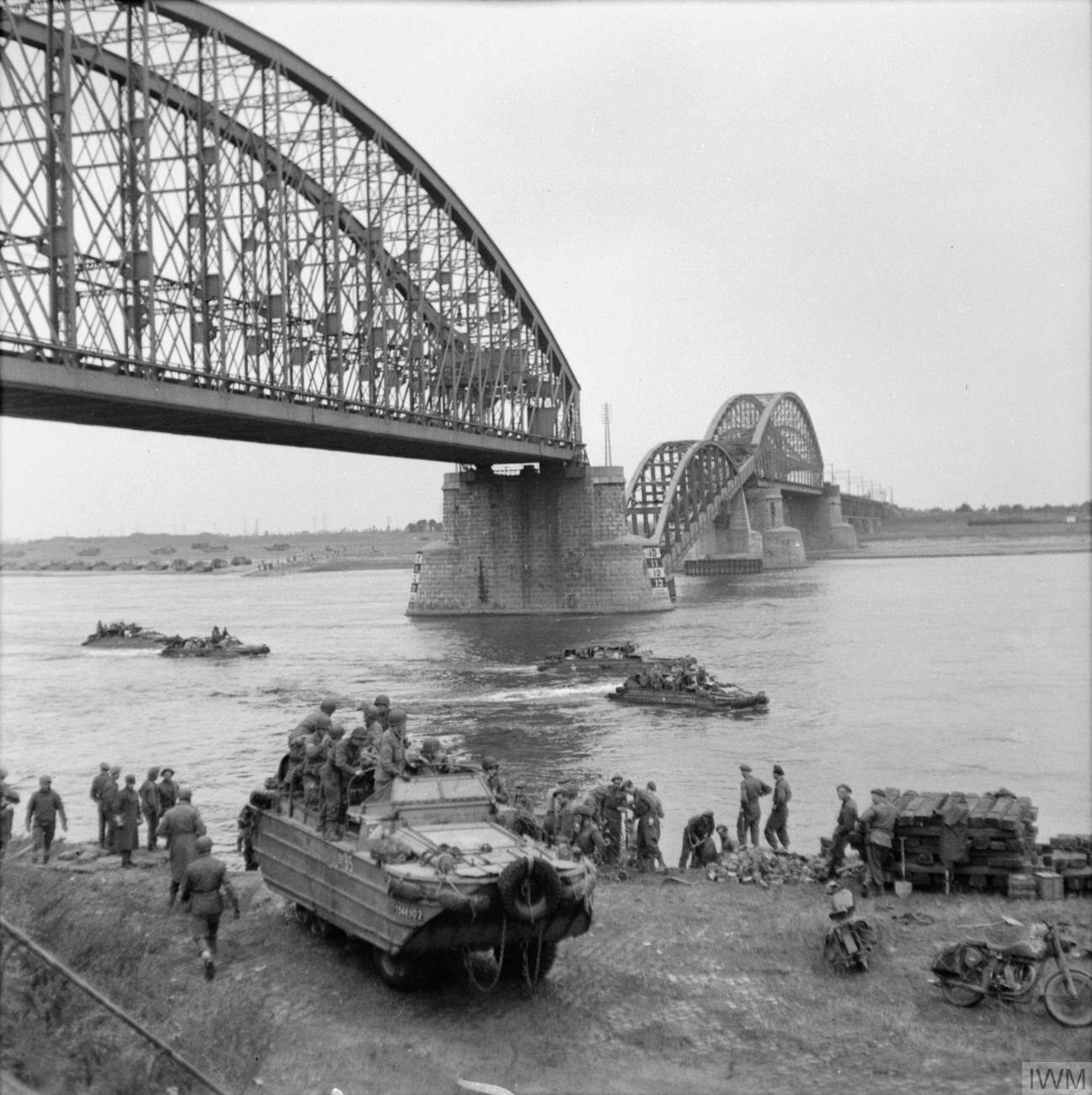
DUKWs transport supplies across the River Waal at Nijmegen, below the railway bridge whose central span was broken by German frogmen using floating mines, 28 September 1944

From 28 September onwards, the II Fallschirmkorps launched a series of assaults from the Reichswald against the Allied positions east of Nijmegen. Delays in the preparations of II SS Panzer Korps however meant these were repelled as they weren't properly supported by XII SS Korps, even though the latter carried out some local diversionary attacks across the Nederijjn towards Doorwerth Castle and Wageningen – these too being repulsed.

=== Nijmegen bridge ===
Before the offensive took place Model ordered both of Nijmegen's bridges to be destroyed so that allied reinforcements could be hindered. The British had already installed a strong anti-aircraft defence there made up of the 100th Anti-Aircraft Brigade. German Luftwaffe fighters launched many sorties to blow the bridges, but this was a costly failure - in one day forty-six fighters were lost to the RAF and anti-aircraft fire. Instead, an attempt to blow the bridge by other means was sought. Frogmen from the German Marine Einsatzkommando said that they could attempt it. On 28 September, three groups of four German frogmen set off from 10 km upstream from the bridges to place explosives under them, and then to continue with the river current 24 km in an attempt to return to their lines. The operation was a partial success - the railway bridge was blown up, a span managed to break away from a section & fell into the river making it totally unusable, but the road bridge was only slightly damaged because the mine had been badly placed. Of the twelve men, three were killed, seven were captured, and two managed to return to their lines. The photo shows DUKW's from 536 Company RASC. The bridges however were repaired albeit temporarily - Royal Engineers were able to span a Bailey bridge both over the railway bridge and the damaged section of the road bridge.

== German counter offensive ==
The start of the operation had to be postponed several times, due to difficulties in assembling the 9th and 116th Panzer Divisions. Allied bombing and a shortage of petrol caused considerable delay in the scheduled assembly of troops and equipment for both divisions. These had to be re-routed by train and road transport from the fighting at Aachen. II SS Panzer Korps' attack, originally set for 29 September, therefore was shifted to the following day. By then however both Panzer Divisions had arrived without their tank units and had to be supported by armoured units already present, and only one regiment of the 116th Panzer Division had arrived. The 9th Panzer Division had organised itself into two assault groups: Kampfgruppe Volker on the left, which consisted of the II/Panzer Grenadier Regiment 11; and Kampfgruppe Reich to the right consisting of II Panzer Grenadier Regiment 10. Volker supported by a company of heavy Tiger II tanks of the 506th Heavy Panzer Battalion, was strike first to the South of Elst near Heuvel. The 9th Panzer Division's primary target was the Elst area, and from there the division was to move further south towards Nijmegen bridge.

On 30 September the counter offensive opened with an attack consisting of seventy tanks and the equivalent of an infantry division were thrown against the East Yorkshires on the outskirts of Bemmel; this attack was repelled easily in the daylight, and the Germans suffered heavy losses mainly to artillery fire. Another pre-emptive strike on British defences beforehand was ordered – an early morning crossing of the Rhine at Doorwerth Castle a mile downstream from Driel was the target. At 0600 crossing in rubber boats the Germans were however shot to pieces by British fire – reinforcements came forward but the rubber boats were all destroyed.

=== Elst and Aam ===
II SS Panzer Corps's main counter-attack began as planned on 1 October, facing them was an ad hoc British force of four battalions: 5th Wiltshire Regiment, 4th Somerset Light Infantry, 3rd Irish Guards and the 7th Green Howards.

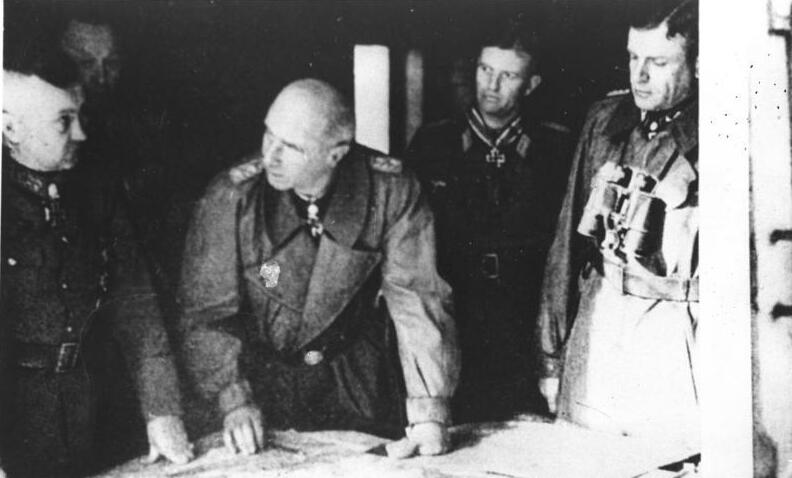
Field Marshal Walter Model (left) conversing with Wilhelm Bittrich in the Arnhem sector

Under a creeping barrage in the morning mist, Kampfgruppe Volker, supported by Tiger II tanks, struck at Heuvel against the 7th Green Howards, the left-hand battalion of the 50th Northumbrian Division's 69th Brigade; here fighting raged all day. Supporting the Howards were the 3rd Battalion Irish Guards who also held the hamlet of Aam – around an unfinished road which was to connect Arnhem with Nijmegen. Meanwhile in Elst the 4th Somersets were defending the town, and managed to repel the German attacks. Saint-Martin Church was used by Royal Artillery FOO's and were targets for the German artillery in return, but the thick walls meant the church suffered moderate damage.

In the afternoon the two battle groups that constituted the 10th SS Panzer Division, the 21st and 22nd SS Panzer Grenadier Regiments, launched an attack against the British right flank at Bemmel from the area of Baal all the way to Haalderen. The latter on Bemmel was supported by tanks which struck the positions of the 6th Highland Light Infantry, which had taken over from the 5th East Yorkshires the previous day and experienced its first day in the frontline. The attack was repelled by 1620 hours having petered out due to heavy British defensive artillery fire and boggy ground which was unsuitable for the tanks.

Kampfgruppe Reich, composing of infantry of the 10th Panzer Grenadier Regiment assaulted the Irish Guards positions on and around the high embankment to the east of the unfinished road near Aam, but this attack was blunted with heavy casualties – with the Shermans and artillery cutting down the German infantry. Later that afternoon, at about 16:30 hours, the East Yorkshires were ordered to relieve the 7th Green Howards, even though severely attacked by German tanks, infantry and subjected to heavy shellfire. The East Yorkshires had to abandon the Heuvel area because of the proximity of the Germans, but this area remained a no man's land, and the British had held off all German attempts to dislodge them. The Germans had lost some eight tanks with two being knocked out the rest having been bogged down or broken down. One Tiger II was destroyed by five PIAT hits.

By the evening the two battalions of Regimentsgruppe Grollmann were ready and launched an attack on Snodenhoek, the area to the north-west of Elst, as their immediate objective. The 2nd Battalion of the 156th Panzergrenadier Regiment, which had formed up near Rijkerswoerd, was to strike to the left of the Arnhem – Elst road (also known as the Griftdijk). It was to be followed shortly after by the 1st Battalion of the same regiment, which was to advance on the right and gain a passage over the railroad level crossing in the area of De Leer. Since the Panzer Division had arrived without its own tanks, five Tiger II tanks of the 506th Heavy Panzer Battalion and four Panthers of the 9th SS Panzer Division were attached in support. The Germans attacked the British defences along the Linge-Wetering Canal hard north of Elst, a position held by the 4th Somersets. Again the attack was a complete failure and the Germans were pushed back. The attack on 5th Wiltshires at the level crossing were supported by tanks which advanced along the railway line. The Wiltshires were supported by Royal Artillery direct fire plans from 5.5 inch guns whom they managed to inflict heavy casualties – a number of tanks were knocked out and one Panther tank fell victim to a PIAT team. The 4th Wiltshires were supporting, and in a combined counter-attack took over 100 prisoners that day.

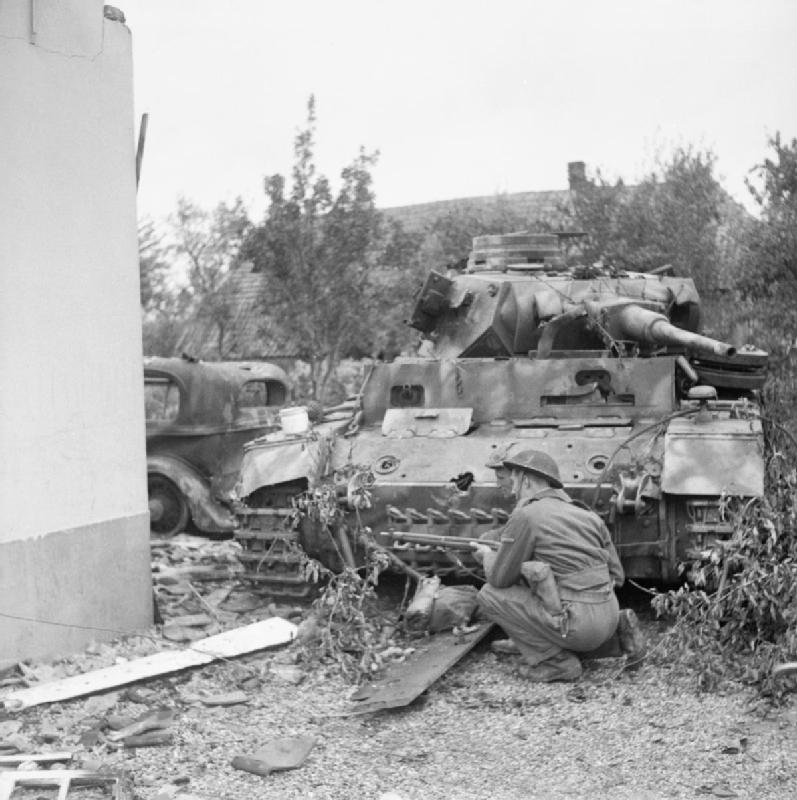
Two soldiers crouch near a knocked-out German PzKpfw III near Nijmegen days after Operation Market Garden had ended

All German attacks on 1 October were repelled after bitter fighting. During the night the Germans maintained their pressure and in the early hours of the following morning, a renewed assault hit the Irish Guards positions. Here the Germans used the unfinished causeway as their axis of advance, and in this second attack on Aam, the German infantry was supported by eight Panther tanks. The Germans used flame throwers which overran a few forward positions – a seventeen pounder was knocked out, but in return three German tanks were destroyed – one by a PIAT, another by a Sherman and a third by a 17 pounder. Again the German attack was a complete failure.

=== Allied air attacks ===
On 2 October 1944, Thomas asked for air support for attacks on the German bridgehead south of Arnhem to disrupt their counter-attacks. In the late afternoon the sky cleared sufficiently for rocket firing RAF Typhoons to scatter German tanks and infantry among the orchards. They also attacked the ferry sites at Huissen and Pannerden, German artillery positions, troop concentration areas and the passage points to the east side of Lower Rhine. The air strikes were also aimed at the Arnhem road bridge. Medium bombers attacked Huissen and the settlement of 't Zand, which were suspected concentration areas for German troops. At around 11:00 am, 24 B-25 Mitchells dropped their bombs in the centre of Huissen and destroyed a large part of the town killing 106 civilians. That afternoon, medium bombers attacked the villages of Angeren, Gendt, Doornenburg and Pannerden causing more civilian losses.

=== Renewal of the offensive ===
Despite the failures on the first few days Heeresgruppe B insisted on a continuation of the offensive. Their commanders including Bittrich realized that, given the poor ground conditions and the strength of the British defences, further attempts to force a breakthrough were pointless. German morale began to plummet – during the daytime of 2 October, three deserters from the 1/156 Panzer Grenadier Regiment came over the railway embankment near the De Laar farm, and divulged the news of another attack taking place that evening to the British – namely 5th Wiltshires. They told their interrogators that their company commander had refused to take further responsibility for another assault, and had been sacked. The renewed attack by the 1/156 in the evening of 2 October did gain a foothold at the level crossing but was halted by heavy British defensive fire. The next day a counter-attack by the 5th Wiltshires threw the Germans back behind the railroad by early afternoon and consolidated their position. The following evening the depleted 5th battalion Wiltshire regiment in the De Laar area having lost twenty-four men killed were relieved by the 4th battalion which until then had been held in 129th brigade reserve.

On the night of 2/3 October a renewed effort against Elst was launched, but again the German infantry were unable to carry the British position, suffering heavy losses– the German attack observed from the church was broken up artillery fire. The next day, 'A Company' of the 4th Somerset Light infantry counterattacked the area to the north of the canal and drove the Germans back to point 9.5, halfway between de 'Oude Tol' and 'De Gouden Klomp' taking 37 prisoners in the process, by the end of the day that number rose to eighty prisoners. In the two day battle the Somersets lost around 150 casualties but in return had inflicted just as many if not more on the Germans.

Meanwhile further North Kampfgruppe Zander, which had only recently arrived at the Arnhem bridgehead made an attempt to try and seize Driel. On 4 October, the Germans had established positions around a farmstead, as troops assembled in nearby open fields. Their objective was to seize the northernmost part of the railway embankment which obstructed all views to the west; this being held by the 1st Dorsets. The Germans launched a two pronged attack on both sides of the railway supported by Panther tanks firing from across the river, but despite gaining a foothold the Germans were eventually repulsed by the Dorsets. The following day renewed assaults brought nothing but more heavy casualties, and the Dorsets remained firm.

On the 5 October near the De Laar farm an effort was made by 4th Wiltshires 'D' Coy, to push back the Germans back that had infiltrated into the area west of the railway. 8 Platoon of 'A' Coy, was placed under command of 'D' Coy for this operation and together with 18 Platoon they succeeded not only routing the Germans in front of them but also took 97 pows. Casualties were heavy however – B and D companies had to be amalgamated into one unit.

=== Bemmel and Haalderen ===
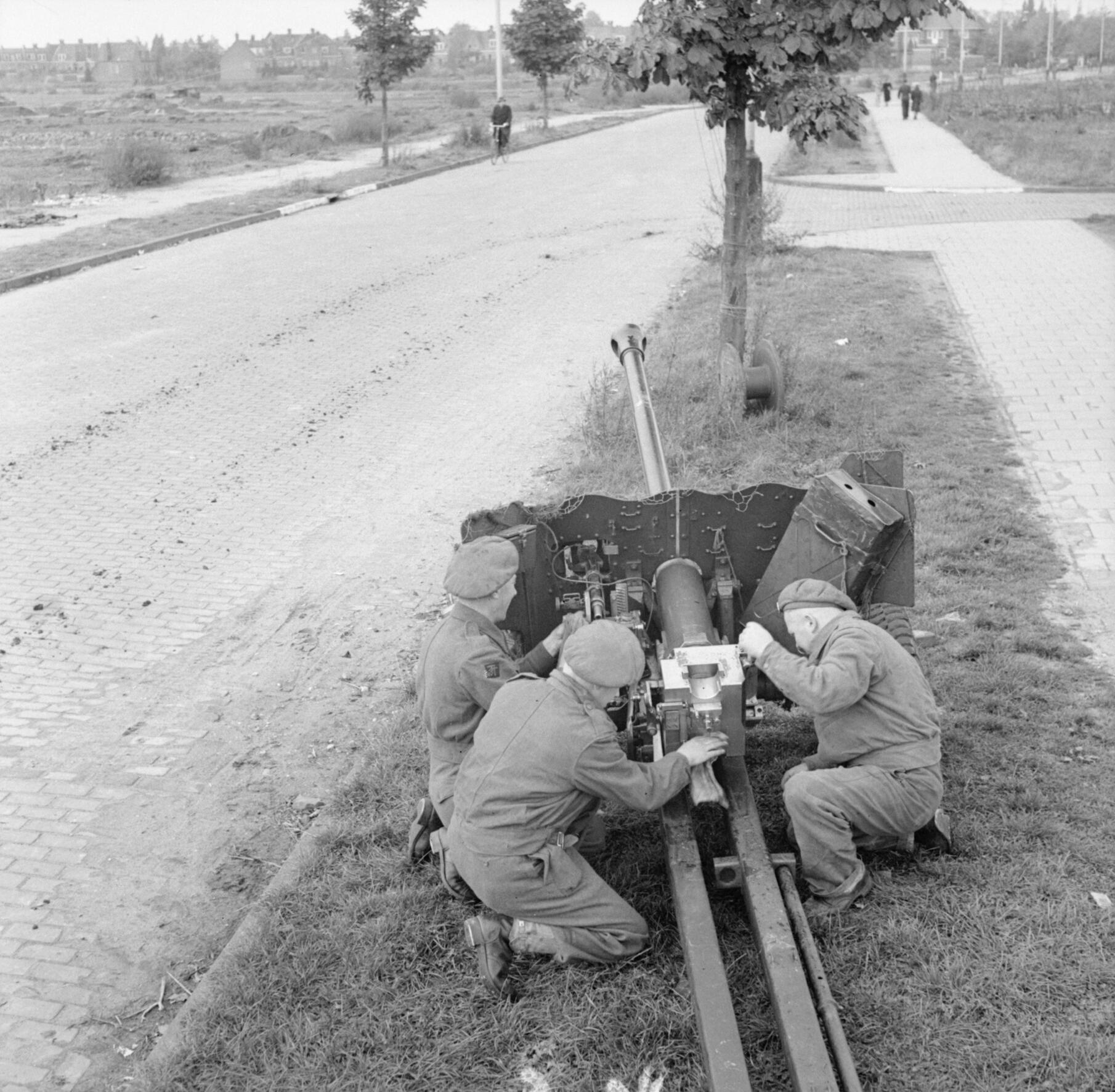
A six pounder anti-tank gun is set up to protect a road near Nijmegen in October 1944

On 3 October Thomas ordered 151st Durham and the 231st brigades to relieve the hard pressed 69th. This new formation was ordered by Thomas to counterattack and drive the Germans from the Bemmel area. In phase I, 231st brigade was to secure the left flank of the division; the area of Heuvel was to be attacked by the 1st Dorsets, while the orchards opposite the Houtakker farm were to be attacked by 1st Hampshires. The 151st were to attack towards Baal (8th Durham Light infantry) and Haalderen (9th DLI). Just before the British could mount an attack the Germans struck first on 3 October – the II SS Panzer Korps attacked that evening in an attempt to secure the Heuvel – Vergert area, Bittrich committed his last reserve, the reconnaissance battalion of the 10th SS, the SS-Panzer-Aufklärungsabteilung 10. A heavy, twenty minute artillery barrage, which hit the entire 231st brigade area preceded the attack. The German attack struck the 2nd Devons and 1st Hampshires hard, and 'C' company of the former was surrounded – the 3rd Squadron of 1st Coldstream Guards fired at muzzle flashes for two hours – the German attack was repelled. A counterattack by 'B' Company of the 2nd Devons, supported by tanks of 3rd squadron restored the position.

The German attack had no impact on the British plans and their counterattack jumped off on schedule at noon on 4 October. Heuvel was attacked by 1st Dorsets as planned and after bitter fighting secured what was left of the hamlet capturing nearly 100 SS soldiers of Kampfgruppe Bruhn who had little over 100 men left. The Dorsets suffered heavy casualties, some 89 in all. The DLI battalions were supported by Sherman tanks of the 4th/7th Royal Dragoon Guards of 8th Armoured brigade. With an artillery barrage and close support from rocket firing Typhoons – 8th DLI managed to capture Haalderen with all objectives taken by 5:30 pm – having suffered 40 wounded. The 9th DLI however encountered heavier resistance at Baal, with 'A' company losing all but one of their officers. A German counter attack consisting of eight tanks was repelled, but the objectives were taken. The 6th Highland Light Infantry were sent south of Haalderen to take positions beyond which included a number of brick factories – their attack was costly partly due to inaccurate maps. Not only that they were struck by friendly fire – a platoon was ambushed with thirty men taken prisoner. Nevertheless the attack succeeded, and the Germans withdrew from the area following which 6th DLI came up to relieve the HLI. The two factories on the banks of the Waal were taken – further opposition melted away in front of them. The Durhams managed to surround two companies of Panzer Grenadiers – 150 prisoners fell into their hands along with mortars, anti-tank guns and Panzershrecks. The Royal Dragoon Guards lost two tanks and seven casualties.

The following day, after the Durham battalions were secure on their objectives, Phase III of counter attack was to start. During the late afternoon and evening the 2nd Devonshire Regiment having struggled against incessant mortar and artillery fire finally succeeded in mopping up the Germans in the orchards around Vergert. More than thirty POWs from the 9th Panzer Division were taken in the process, and the battalion's position was further strengthened by 'D' Coy, which had been relieved by the Coldstream Guards, further to the west. The company thickened up the centre of the position, by occupying the area between 'A' and 'B' companies. The Devons had lost nearly sixty casualties, and reported that the fields north of their positions were littered with German dead.

Reports from British patrols also found that the Germans had withdrawn to the line of the Wettering Canal, their original starting line being their only credible defensive position. The 50th Division's brigades had effectively crippled 10th SS Panzer division. The Guards armoured division was withdrawn on 6 October to Malden four miles South of Nijmegen for a rest.

=== Driel, Randwijk and Opheusden ===
After the attacks of the 9th and 116th Panzer Divisions in his Corps' centre, against Aam and Elst, had been defeated, Bittrich, who was under strong pressure from OB West to continue the assault, decided to change tactics. On the Corps' right, near the Lower Rhine, an effort was made to seize Driel. A diversionary attack was also to be made at Opheusden by the German 363rd Volksgrenadier Division.

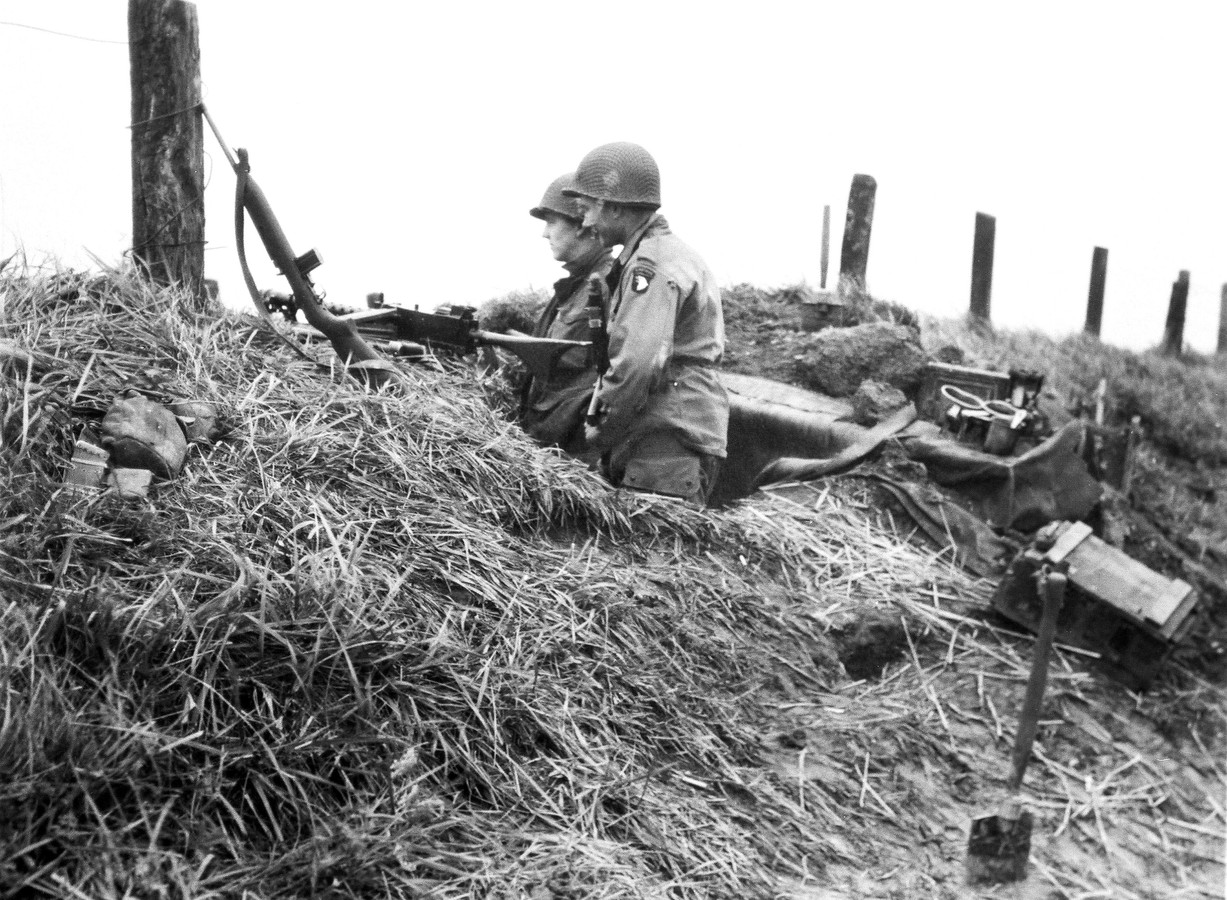
Paratroopers of the 2nd/506th (101st Airborne Division), near Randwijk at the time of the German counter offensive 5 – 6 October

By the early hours of 5 October the 43rd Wessex handed over their positions to the 506th Parachute Infantry Regiment of the US 101st Airborne Division brought up from Eindhoven – they had no heavy artillery themselves but were supported by British artillery units, the 43rd Wessex anti-tank and mortar platoons, elements of the Duke of Cornwall Light Infantry, as well as the divisional reserve. One of the most difficult handovers was with the 1st Dorsets near Driel who were under a continual bombardment and in close proximity with the 116th Panzer Division. That evening another German attack reached the wooded area west of the embankment, and part of this force infiltrated between 'C' and 'D' Coys. After bitter fighting the Germans were thrown back losing some 36 POWs before the Dorsets under great difficulty handing over to the Americans. During the handover the 101st Airborne's commander, Major General Maxwell Taylor, was injured in the backside.

At Driel, by the railway embankment facing north-south, American paratroopers found themselves facing an attack by the 116th Panzer Division with support from two Sturmgeschütz III assault guns. One of these was knocked out by a British six pounder in an underpass while the other withdrew. The infantry attempted to retreat but two companies of Panzer Grenadiers were surrounded and captured by the Americans. The defeat forced the 116th Panzer Division to withdraw behind the embankment.

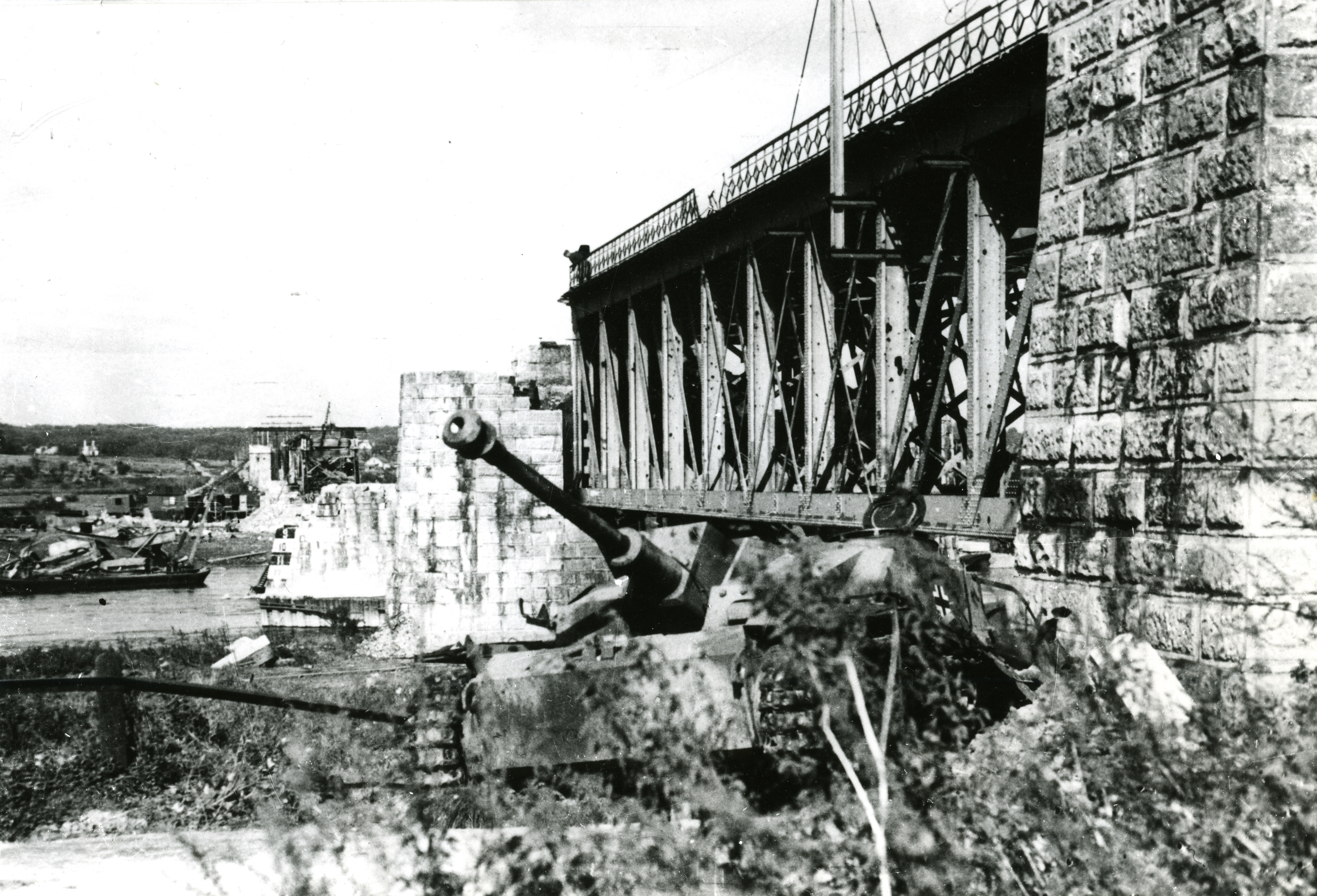
One of the Sturmgeschütz III assault guns knocked out by a six pounder near the Driel railway bridge

Meanwhile at Randwijk, aggressive patrolling by the Americans soon landed themselves head on against a troop concentration of German infantry forming up for an attack. This was a diversionary attack – the main attack was going to be attempted on Opheusden. The area with which the 506th defended included Easy Company – a platoon from which with thirty-five men, routed two German companies of about 300 men. American casualties (including those from Fox Company) were one dead, twenty-two wounded. German casualties were fifty killed, eleven captured, about 100 wounded. On 6 October, the 506th in a day of stiff fighting again supported by British artillery rounded up 150 POWs in the area and inflicted heavy losses which was estimated to consist of 300 men (the equivalent of two and a half companies).

On the morning of 6 October the Germans launched their assault on Opheusden. Opposing the Americans were the 363rd Volksgrenadier Division. They completely surprised the US paratroopers and captured the village. A combined Anglo-American counter attack was attempted with the support of tanks of the Royal Scots Greys and with the assistance of the Duke of Cornwall's Light Infantry. The Germans were pushed out in parts of the village but heavy fighting continued. The Dorpsstraat was one of the streets where bitter house to house fighting took place and the battle on Dalwagenseweg road went on for three days. A windmill belonging to the Aalbers family gave refuge to more than 100 of the seriously injured on all sides. The Americans however began to run out of ammunition and casualties were mounting, and the decision was made to withdraw. The battle of Opheusden turned into a stalemate – the Germans couldn't capture the village whole, and nor could the allies. Over the next two days Opheusden was then pounded by rockets from RAF Typhoons as well as artillery leaving it a smouldering ruins. The supporting 5th battalion Cornwalls also suffered heavy casualties – nearly seventy in all, and were relieved by a fresh US battalion later that day.

=== End of the offensive ===
A lull in the battle now took hold as the Germans attempted to bring more supplies. Allied high command now ordered the destruction of the Arnhem road bridge. After poor weather on 5 and 6 October, an attempt was made on the 7th – seven USAAF Martin Maurauders of the 344th Bombardment Group, dropped their loads with several direct hits being scored on the road bridge, which completely destroyed it. The bombs in fact had set off German explosives that were placed on the bridge; as a result the centre span of the bridge collapsed into the river. The destruction of the road bridge was the final blow for the German offensive – unable to bring heavy armour and artillery up, further operations by the Germans were halted.

Sporadic attacks continued against the allied salient but major fighting ceased on 8 October. Around Opheusden the fighting continued but on a smaller scale – the Germans could get no further and the village remained a no man's land.

== Aftermath ==
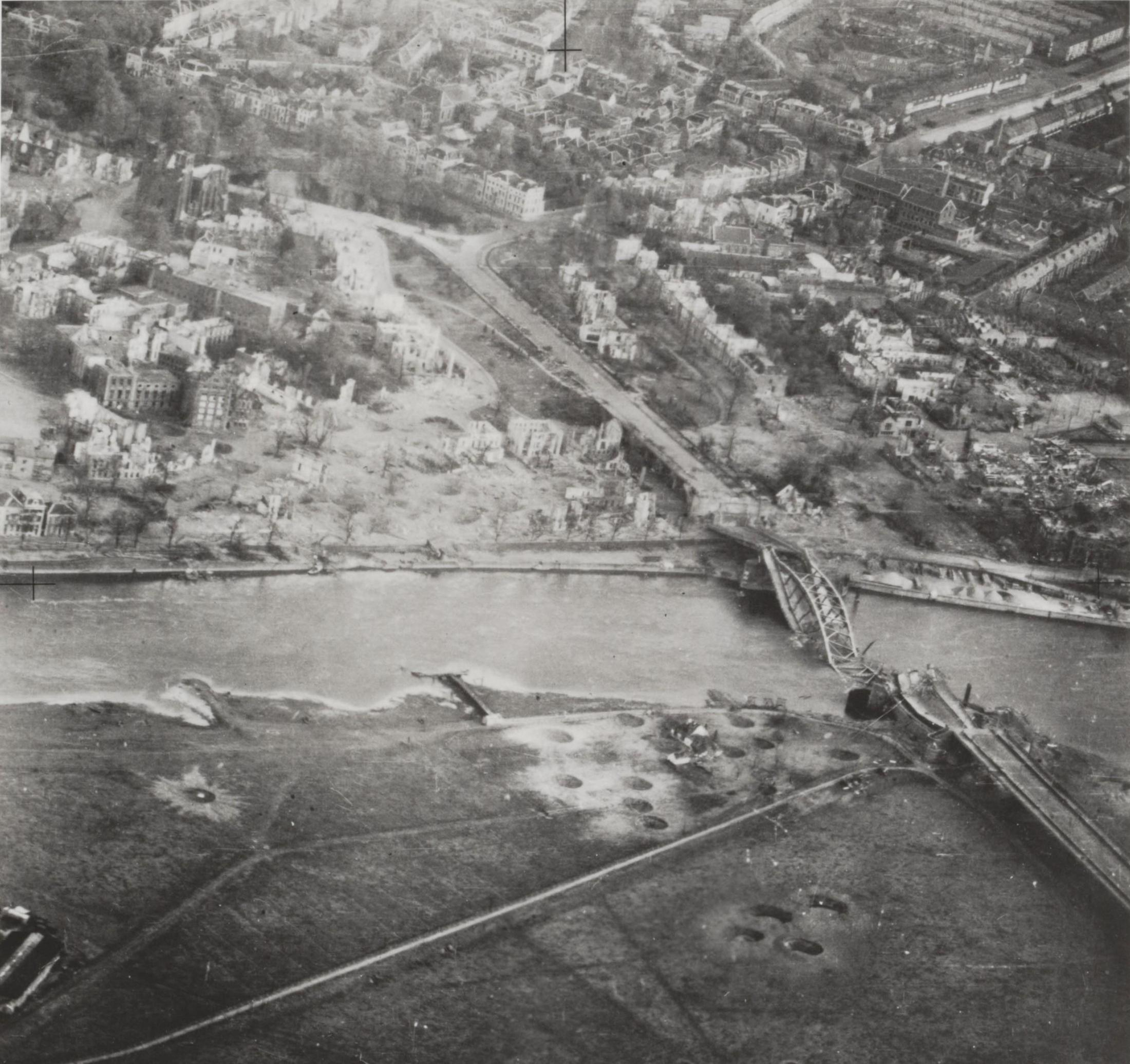
Aerial view of Arnhem showing the road bridge which had been destroyed on 7 October by Allied bombers

The German counter offensive, in particular the 2nd SS Panzer Korps' counterattack, had little to show for, and had suffered heavy losses in men and material. Tanks could give little practical help, as they found cross-country movement in the flat, waterlogged terrain, virtually impossible. Without the close support of armour, the German infantry were thus unable to overcome any position. What's more was that the Germans having initially held the villages of Baal, Heuvel and Haalderen subsequently lost them to British counter-attacks. The 10th SS Panzer Division suffered their worst day on 4 October since their arrival in Holland, and losses were so high that they were unable to mount an attack for some time. The 116th Panzer division had suffered heavy casualties in the attack – around 800. The Germans were now suffering from the lack of new NCOs in replacement of those already lost. British field guns had fired nearly 12,500 rounds on the last day which had inflicted a punishing toll on the Germans. Tank losses were also heavy – the 10th SS lost eight of its supporting Tiger tanks to British anti tank fire as well as mines and artillery fire. The 363rd Volks division was effectively wiped out in the fighting in and around Opheusden.

British losses were moderate but those in the infantry were considerable. Most of these losses were caused by heavy artillery and mortar fire, which was reported as 'intense'. The 4th Somerset Light Infantry had 105 casualties – of these twenty were killed. No further attempts by the allies were made to enlarge the Nijmegen Bridgehead. Reflecting the change in Allied strategy, with emphasis now being placed on operations aimed at the clearing of the Scheldt Estuary. To expand the thin Market Garden salient, Operation Aintree intended to expand Eastwards towards Overloon and the later Operation Pheasant towards North Brabant – both operations were largely successful in their aims.

On 9 October, OB West asked permission to OKW to entirely abandon the Arnhem Bridgehead, but the request was turned down. The 10th SS received orders to establish strong defensive positions south of Arnhem in the Elden area, at Huissen and at Doornenburg, while maintaining a defensive screen close along the Linge Canal. The railway embankment north of Elst was occupied by the Kampfgruppe Harzer, which was renamed Sperrverband (blocking line) Gerhard after its commander, Major Gerhard. By 10 October the remaining Germans abandoned the few brickworks they held due to high casualties and scant supplies. 116th Panzer Division left the Arnhem Bridgehead, its units gradually were ferried across the Nederrijn only at night-time to avoid artillery and aircraft. The Division was eventually transferred to the Aachen front. The 9th Panzer Division was next to be withdrawn and pulled out from 13 October leaving the 10th SS Panzer Division as the sole unit in the bridgehead and remained so until mid-November 1944, when it too was transferred to the Aachen area. The SS-men turned their positions on the Island over to the newly created 6th Fallschirmjäger Division.

Around the same time, British XII Corps took over responsibility of the Nijmegen Bridgehead. The British 50th Division remained in position in the eastern half of the Island until the end of November, assisted for short intervals by the 160th brigade and 71st brigade and 508th U.S. Parachute Regiment of the 82nd US Airborne Division. The 50th was then relieved by the 49th Polar Bear division, while the 51st (Highland) Division took over from the American 101st Airborne.

For the 50th Northumbrian Division, the battle was to be its last. Casualties had been severe: almost 900 of which included twelve officers and 111 other ranks killed in action, thirty officers and 611 other ranks wounded and another 114 missing since the start of the German counterattack. On 29 November the division was relieved and pulled back into Belgium and would return to England as 50th Infantry (Reserve) Division for training.

Gerd von Rundstedt Commander-in-Chief in the West now got permission for Model to abandon the Arnhem bridgehead – the Allies for their part ordered the evacuation of the liberated part of The Island, because they expected that the area would be flooded by the Germans. Model however opted to thin out his forward defences – this happened on 14 October when German units in the bridgehead were reduced to smaller units. Men, women and children were evacuated to southern Holland and Belgium, and the area became known as "Men's Island" or "Manneneiland" with the presence of only soldiers.

=== Further fighting ===
Fighting took place, with two notable actions taking place in winter. In the early hours of 4 December, Generaloberst Kurt Student's Paratroopers, namely the 16th Parachute regiment, launched an assault against the British at Haalderen. The attack fell headlong into well defended positions held by elements of the 49th 'Polar Bear' Division. The paratroopers were repelled with the leading assault company of 160 men wiped out. Another bigger attempt was made on 18 January 1945 by the German 7th Parachute regiment against the British western flank at Zetten. The battle which raged for a few days resulted in bitter fighting, but again the German attack faltered despite gaining a foothold in Zetten. The British, supported by Canadian tanks, counterattacked and surrounded the Germans, resulting in an entire battalion being destroyed – 700 men in all were killed, wounded and (mostly) captured. This was to be the last German attack on the island.

The Island was fully captured in April 1945 during Operation Anger when the 49th 'Polar Bear' Division supported by Canadian armour threw the Germans back over the Rhine. For the civilians returning to The Island however the last nine months of war had left the area in total devastation.

== Legacy ==
The 2001 American war drama HBO miniseries Band of Brothers episode five – 'Crossroads' portrays the German attack on the Driel-Opheusden railroad line near Randwijk on 5 and 6 October.

== Notable participants ==
- Robert Boscawen – a British Conservative politician. As a First Lieutenant commanding No. 2 Troop, No. 2 Squadron of the Coldstream Guards – he was awarded the Military Cross for his actions in supporting the 1st Devons and 2nd Hampshires in helping to repel the German counter attack at Houtakker farm near Bemmel on 3 October.

== Bibliography ==
- Ambrose, Stephen E (2017). Band of Brothers E Company, 506th Regiment, 101st Airborne from Normandy to Hitler's Eagle's Nest. Simon & Schuster. ISBN 9781501179402.
- Barnes, B. S (1999). The Sign of the Double 'T' (The 50th Northumbrian Division – July 1943 to December 1944). Market Weighton: Sentinel Press. ISBN 9780953426201.
- Beevor, Antony (2018). Arnhem The Battle for the Bridges, 1944. Penguin Books Limited. ISBN 9780141941295.
- Berends, Peter (2002). Een andere kijk op de slag om Arnhem: de snelle Duitse reactie. Aspekt. ISBN 9789059110083. (Dutch)
- Boscawen, Robert (2010). Armoured Guardsman A War Diary, June 1944–April 1945. Pen & Sword Books Limited. ISBN 9781848843172.
- Buckley, John (2013). Monty's Men: The British Army and the Liberation of Europe. Yale University Press. ISBN 9780300160352.
- Delaforce, Patrick (2017). Monty's Northern Legions: 50th Northumbrian and 15th Scottish Divisions at War 1939–1945. Fonthill Media. ISBN 9781781553992.
- Delaforce, Patrick (2018). The Fighting Wessex Wyverns: From Normandy to Bremerhaven with the 43rd Wessex Division. Fonthill Media. ISBN 9781781550717.
- Converse, Allan (2011). Armies of Empire: The 9th Australian and 50th British Divisions in Battle 1939–1945. Cambridge University Press. ISBN 9780521194808.
- Ford, Ken (2018). Operation Market-Garden 1944 (3): The British XXX Corps Missions. Bloomsbury Publishing. ISBN 9781472820136.
- Gardner, Richard S; McDonough, James L (1980). Sky Riders History of the 327/401 Glider Infantry. Battery Press. ISBN 9780898390346.
- Greenhous, Brereton (1994). The Crucible of War, 1939–1945, Volume 3 Official history of the Royal Canadian Air Force The Crucible of War, 1939–1945. University of Toronto Press. ISBN 9780802005748.
- Guderian, Heinz Günther (2001). From Normandy to the Ruhr With the 116th Panzer Division in World War II. Aberjona Press. ISBN 9780966638974.
- Hinsley, Francis Harry (1988). British Intelligence in the Second World War: Without special title Volume 3, Issue 2 of British Intelligence in the Second World War: Its Influence on Strategy and Operations. H.M. Stationery Office. p. 393. ISBN 9780521351966.
- Holborn, Andrew (2010). 56th Infantry Brigade and D-Day An Independent Infantry Brigade and the Campaign in North West Europe 1944–1945. Bloomsbury Academic. ISBN 9781441119087.
- Holt, Tonie; Holt, Valmai (2013). Operation Market Garden Leopoldsburg-Eindhoven-Nijmegen-Arnhem-Oosterbeek. Pen & Sword. ISBN 9781473826816.
- Joiner, J. H (1990). One More River To Cross. Pen and Sword. ISBN 9780850527889.
- Lewis, Major P.J; English, Major I.R (2011). 8th Battalion The Durham Light Infantry 1939–1945. Andrews UK Limited. ISBN 9781781515372.
- Lipscomb, Lt.-Col. C. G (2011). History of the 4th Battalion The Somerset Light Infantry (Prince Albert's): in the Campaign in North-West Europe June, 1944–May, 1945. Andrews UK Limited. ISBN 9781781515938.
- Middlebrook, Martin (1994). Arnhem 1944: The Airborne Battle. Viking. ISBN 0-670-83546-3.
- Moses, Harry (2001). The Gateshead Gurkhas A History of the 9th Battalion, the Durham Light Infantry 1859–1967. County Durham Books. ISBN 9781897585658.
- Powell, Geoffrey; Powell, John S. W (2016). The History of the Green Howards. Pen & Sword Books Limited. ISBN 9781473857964.
- Retallack, John (1981). The Welsh Guards – Famous Regiments. Pen and Sword. ISBN 9780723227465.
- Rapport, Leonard; Northwood Jr, Arthur (2015). Rendezvous With Destiny: A History Of The 101st Airborne Division. Lucknow Books. ISBN 9781786254733.
- Saunders, Tim (2008). The Island: Nijmegen to Arnhem Battleground Europe. Pen and Sword. ISBN 9781783037087.
- Stacey, Colonel C. P; Bond, Major C. C. J (1960). The Victory Campaign: The operations in North-West Europe 1944–1945 (PDF). Official History of the Canadian Army in the Second World War. Vol. III. The Queen's Printer and Controller of Stationery Ottawa. OCLC 606015967. Archived from the original (PDF) on 21 December 2020.
- Stenger, Dieter (2017). Panzers East and West: The German 10th SS Panzer Division from the Eastern Front to Normandy. Rowman & Littlefield. ISBN 9780811765909.
- Tieke, Wilhelm (1999). In the Firestorm of the Last Years of the War II. SS-Panzerkorps with the 9. and 10. SS-Divisions "Hohenstaufen" and "Frundsberg". J. J. Fedorowicz. ISBN 9780921991434.
- Tucker-Jones, Anthony (2017). Armoured Warfare and the Waffen-SS 1944–1945. Pen & Sword Books. ISBN 9781473877962.
- Tucker-Jones, Anthony; Caddick-Adams, Peter (2020). The Devil's Bridge The German Victory at Arnhem, 1944. Bloomsbury Publishing. ISBN 9781472839848.
- Waddy, John (2001). A Tour of the Arnhem Battlefields. Pen & Sword Books Limited. ISBN 0-85052-571-3.
