= Baal, Netherlands =

Baal
- Hamlet
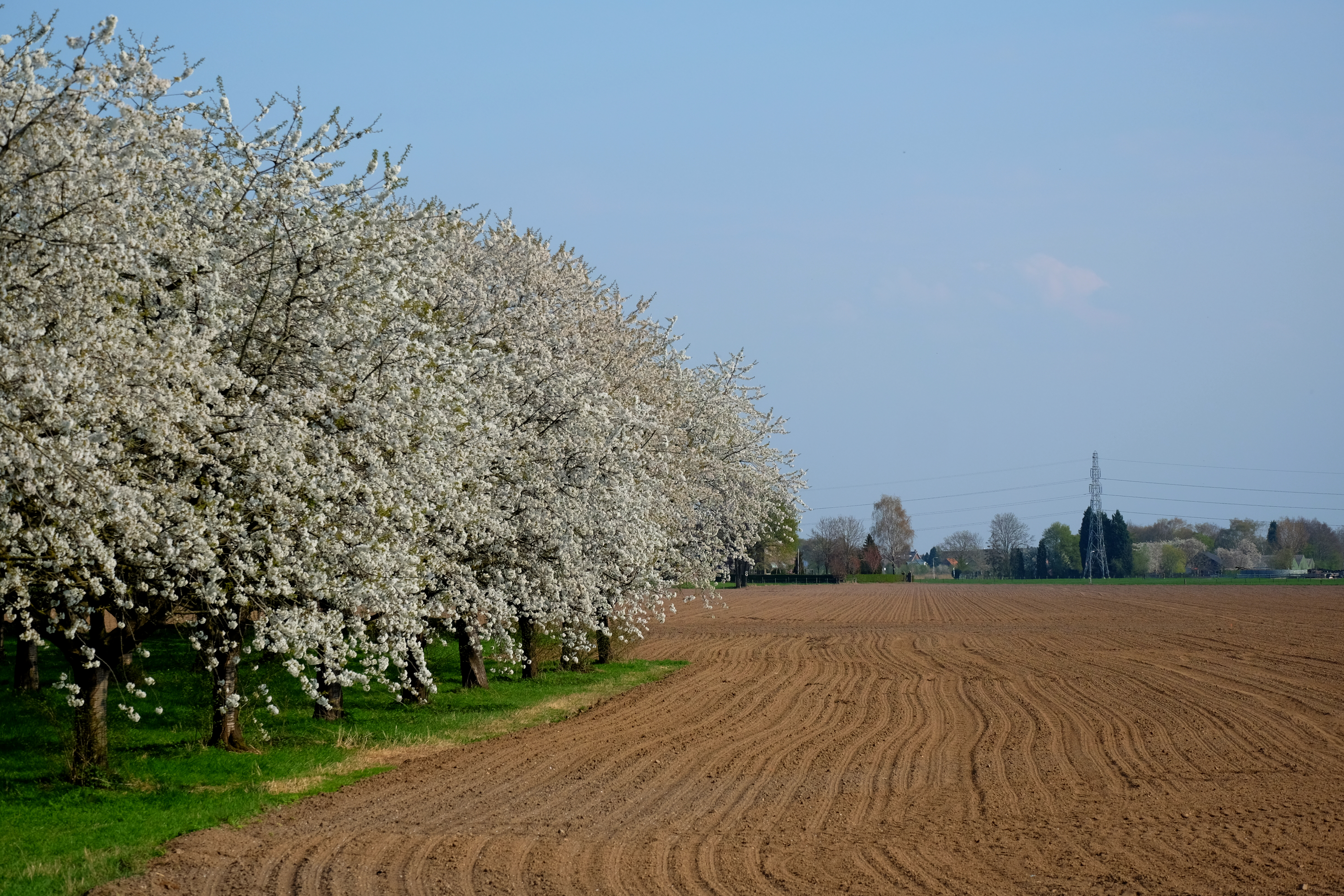
- Cherry trees in Baal

- Location in the Netherlands Baal (Netherlands)
- Coordinates: 51°53′54″N 5°55′10″E
- Country: Netherlands
- Province: Gelderland
- Municipality: Lingewaard
- Elevation: 10 m (33 ft)
- Time zone: UTC+1 (CET)
  - Summer (DST): UTC+2 (CEST)
- Postal code: 6685
- Dialing code: 0481

Baal is a hamlet in the Dutch province of Gelderland. It is located in the municipality of Lingewaard, about 1 km northeast of Bemmel, and located 1 kilometer north of Haalderen and is therefore part of Haalderen.

It was first mentioned in 850 as Barla, and means "bare forest". Baal is not a statistical entity, and the postal authorities have placed it under Haalderen. The hamlet used to have its own place name signs which looked like signs for a build up area, however the municipality removed them in 2017. The villagers have since then put up new signs. In 1840, Baal was home to 46 people. Nowadays, it consists of about 15 houses. There used to be 16 houses. In 1996 a house was destroyed by a Lockheed C-130 Hercules, killing 34 people on board. The house was empty at the time.
