= Elden, Netherlands =

Elden
- Village
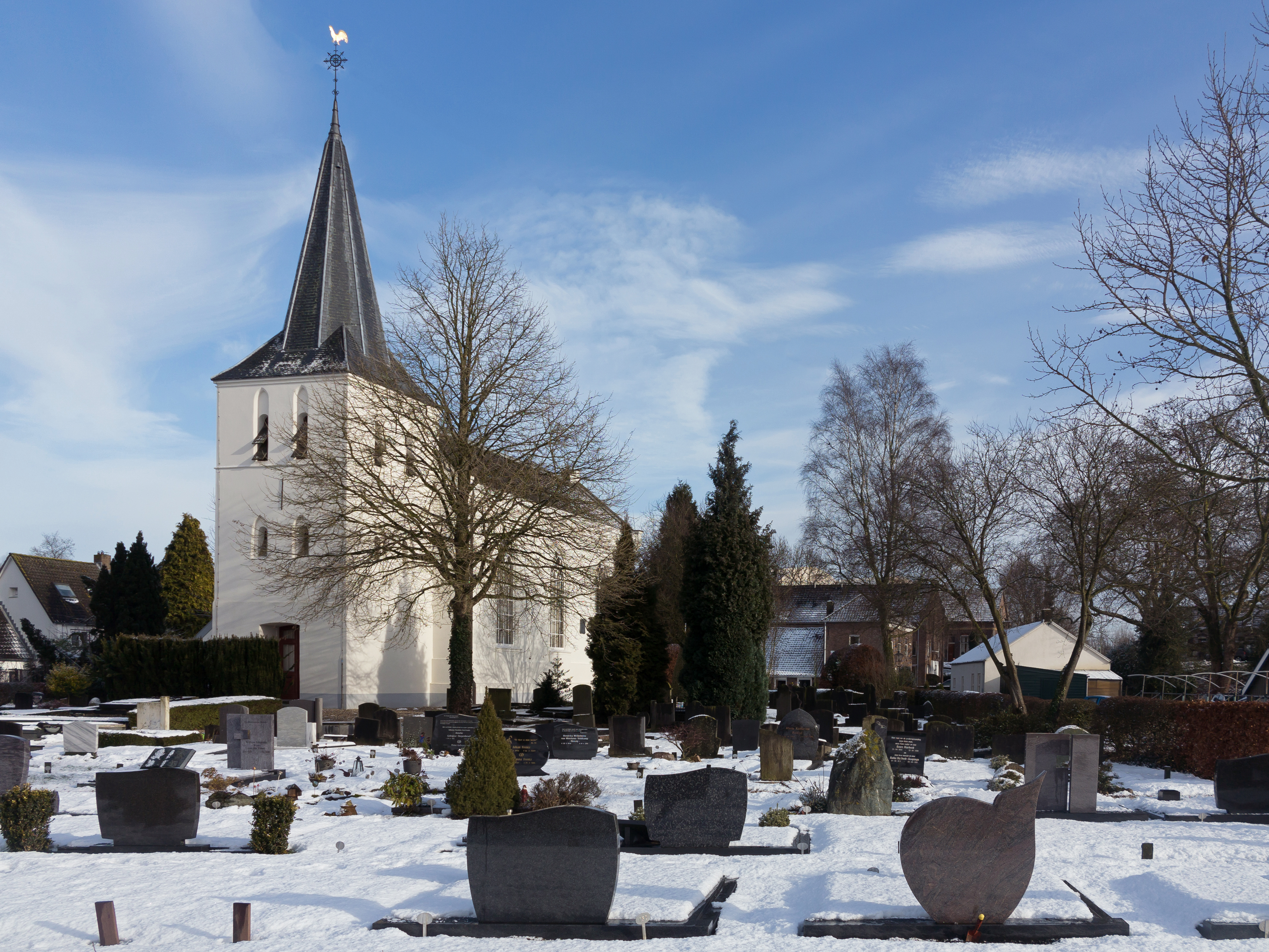
- Elden, church: Bonifaciuskerk

- Flag Coat of arms

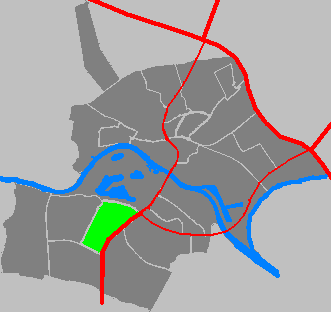
- Location in Arnhem

- Location in the province of Gelderland in the Netherlands Elden (Netherlands)
- Coordinates: 51°58′N 5°53′E
- Country: Netherlands
- Province: Gelderland
- Municipality: Arnhem

Area
  - Total: 1.87 km^{2} (0.72 sq mi)
- Elevation: 10 m (33 ft)

Population (2021)
  - Total: 2,865
  - Density: 1,530/km^{2} (3,970/sq mi)
- Time zone: UTC+1 (CET)
  - Summer (DST): UTC+2 (CEST)
- Postal code: 6842
- Dialing code: 026

Elden is a village in the Dutch province of Gelderland. It is located in the municipality of Arnhem, about 4 km southwest of the city centre.

Elden was a separate municipality between 1813 and 1818, when it was merged with Elst. It became part of Arnhem in 1966.

The village of Elden, on the south side of the Rhine, has now been completely surrounded by neighbourhoods of the city of Arnhem and is now an enclave. The village still has its own place name signs.

== History ==
The village was first mentioned in 855 as Elti. The etymology is unknown. The Saint Boniface dates from the 14th century.

Elden was home to 791 people in 1840. Around 1930, Arnhem started to expand to the other side of the Rhine. In 1935, the bridge over the Rhine which is nowadays called John Frost Bridge was built. Most of the village was destroyed during Operation Market Garden during which 2nd Parachute Battalion commanded by John Frost managed to take the bridge, but found itself surrounded.

== Gallery ==
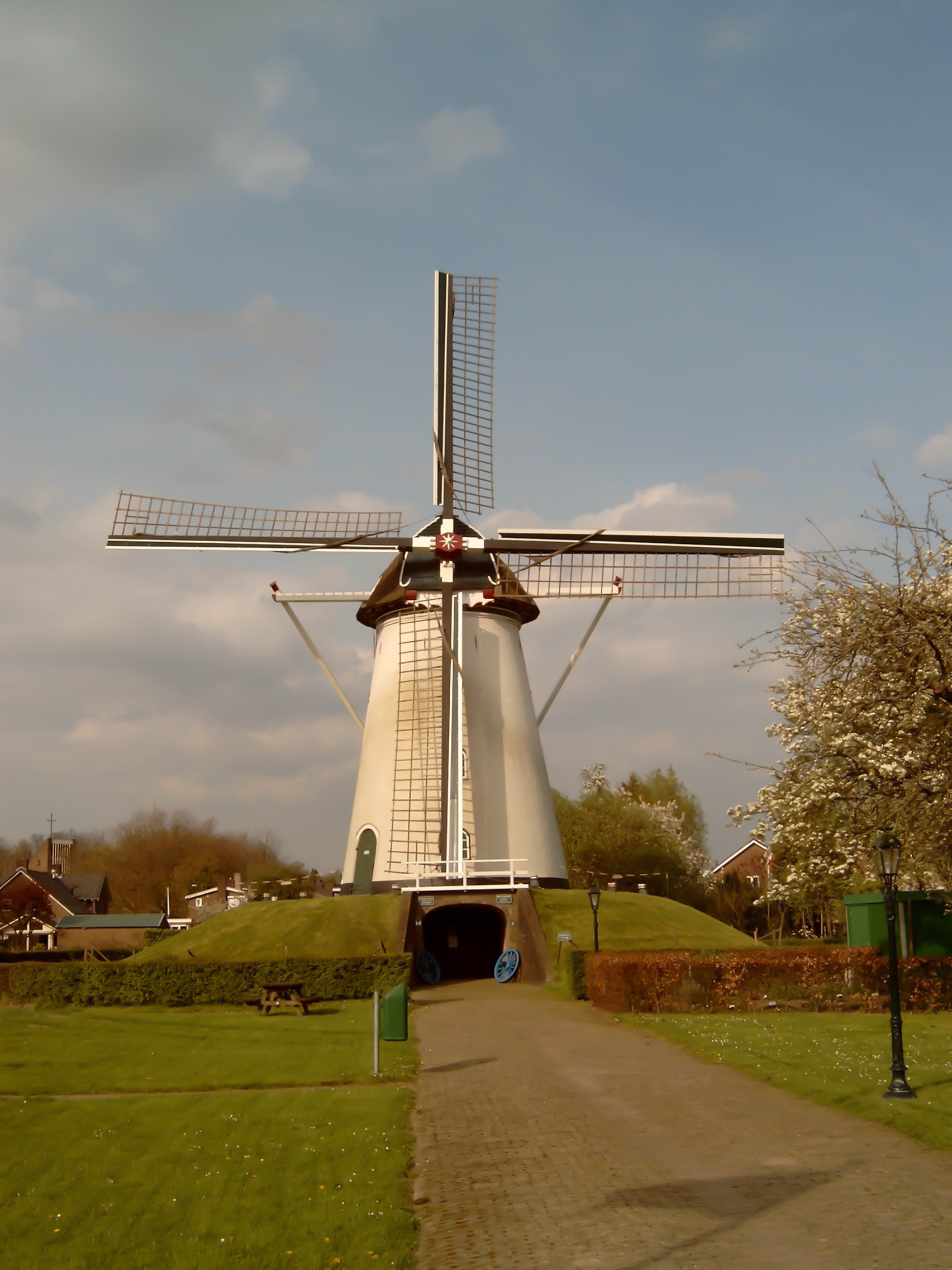
Elden, windmill De Hoop, Elden

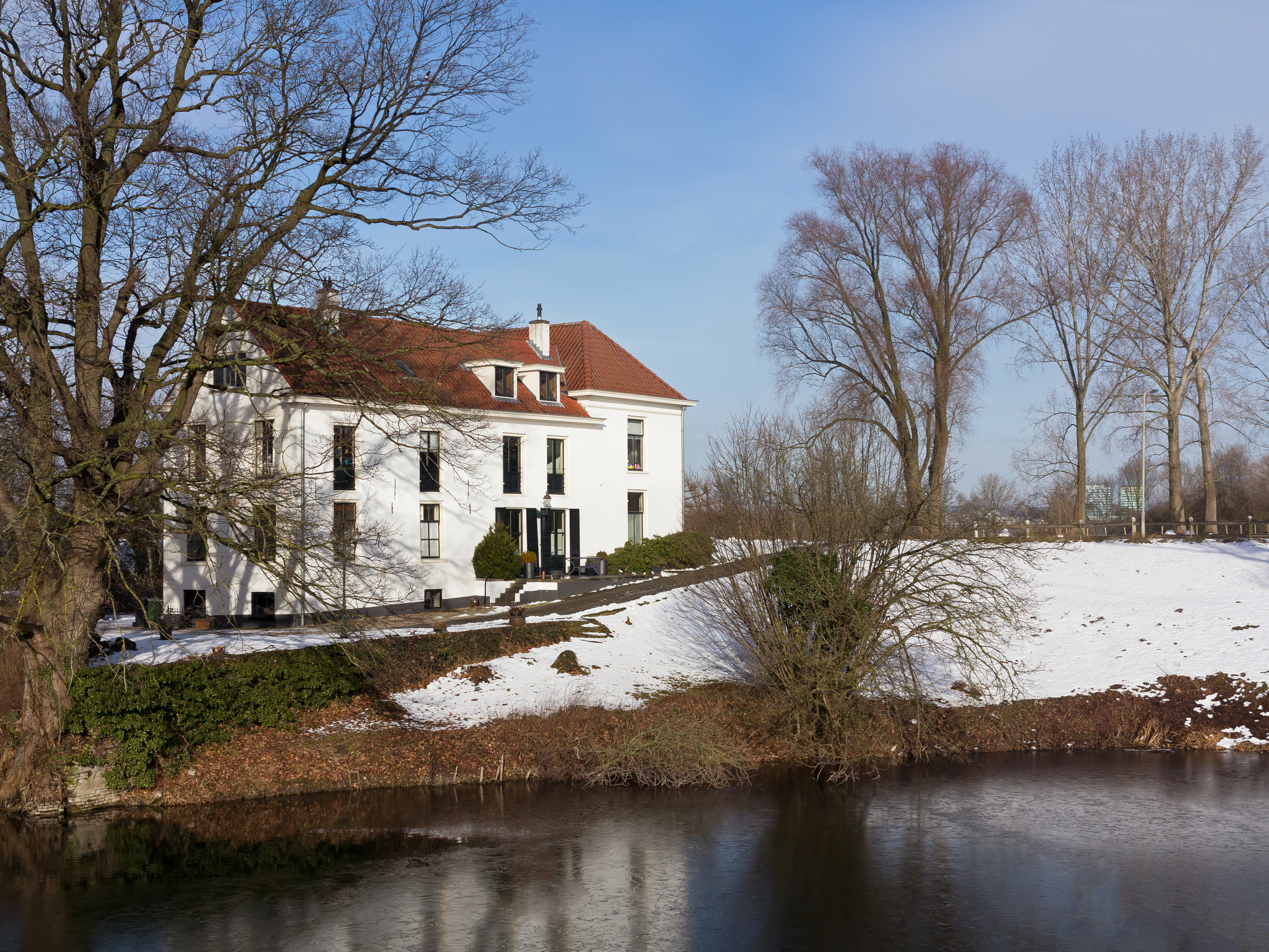
Elden, monumental living-house

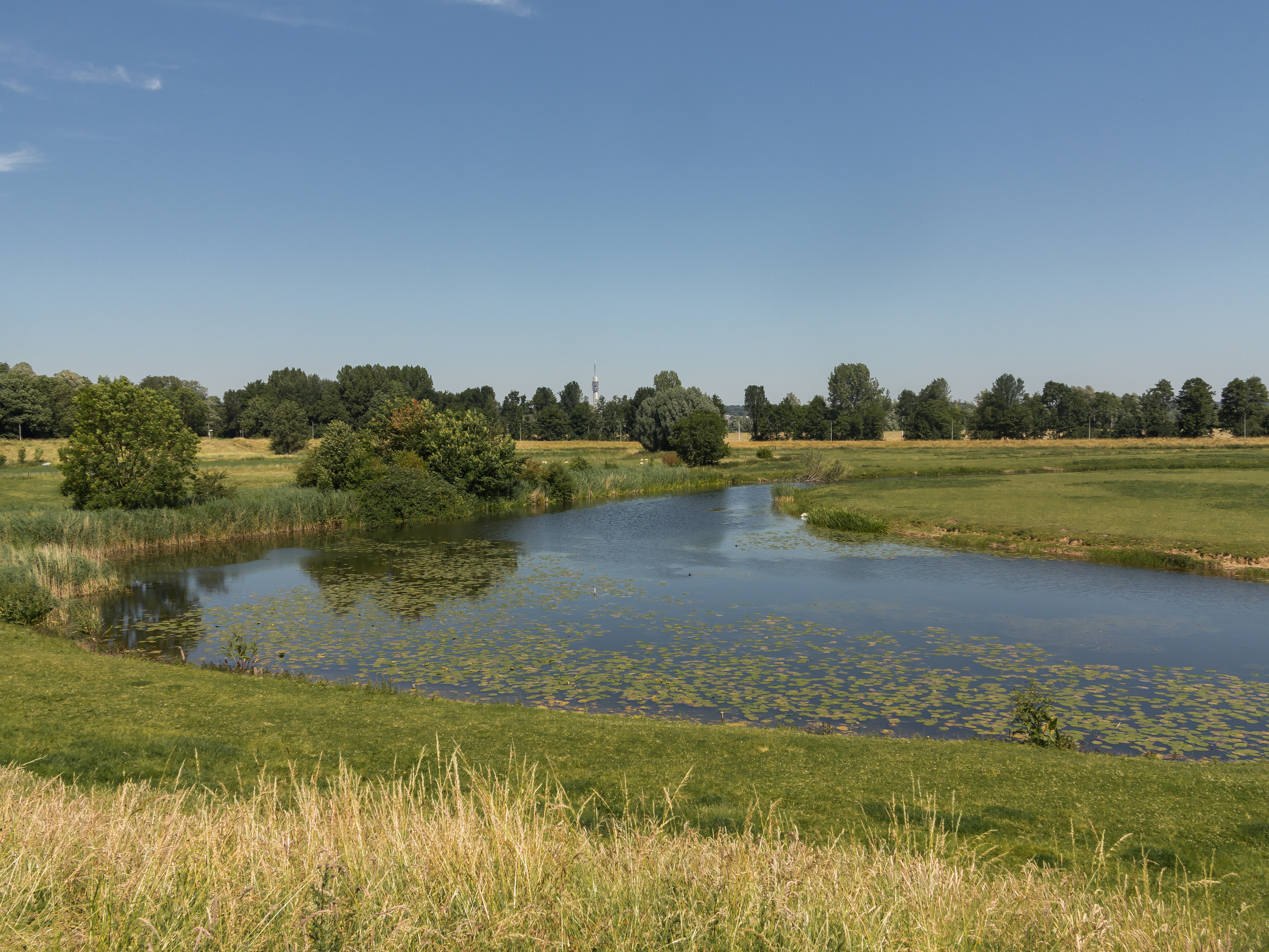
Town lake: Het Hoefijzer

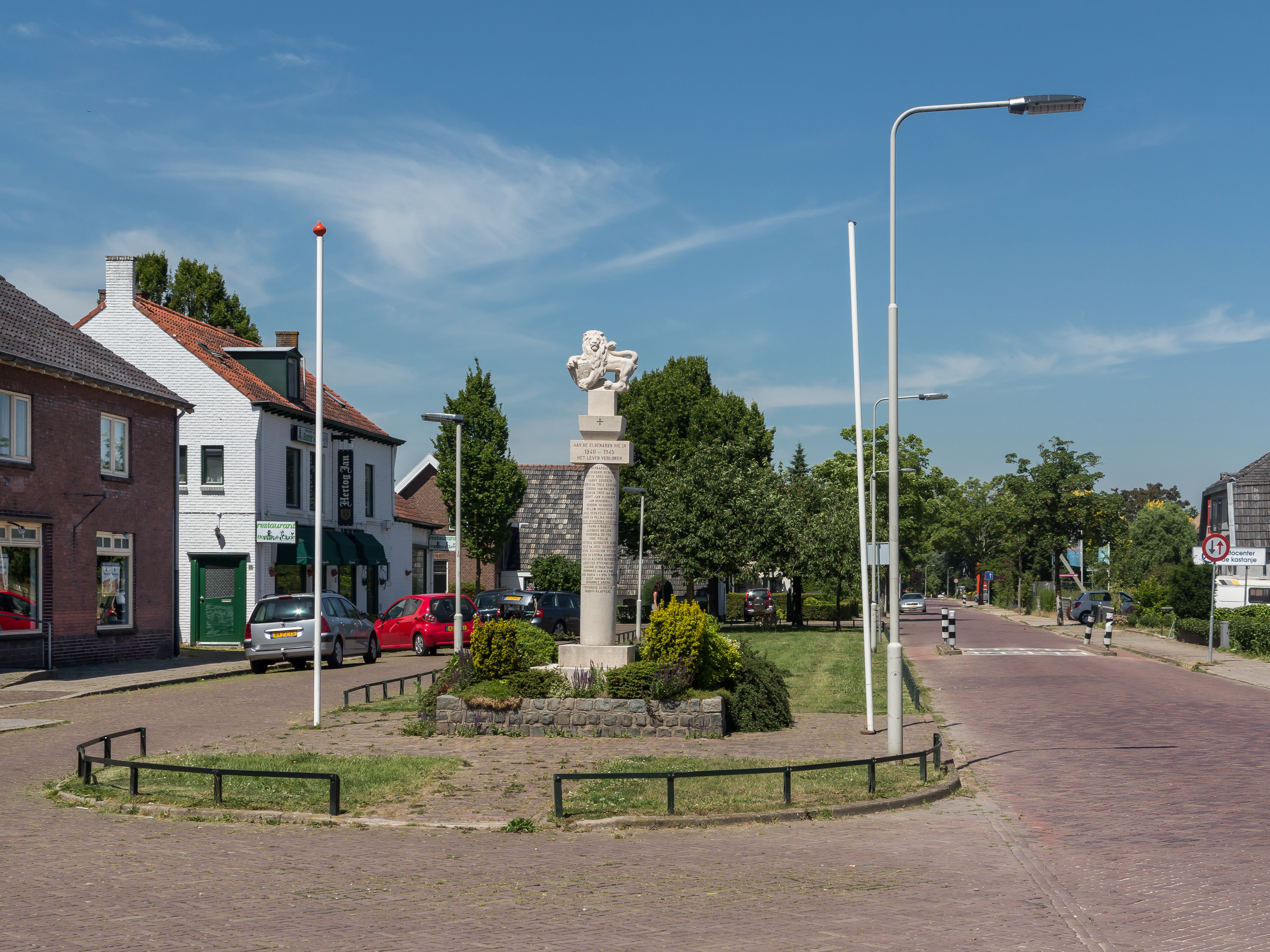
War memorial at de Klapstraat

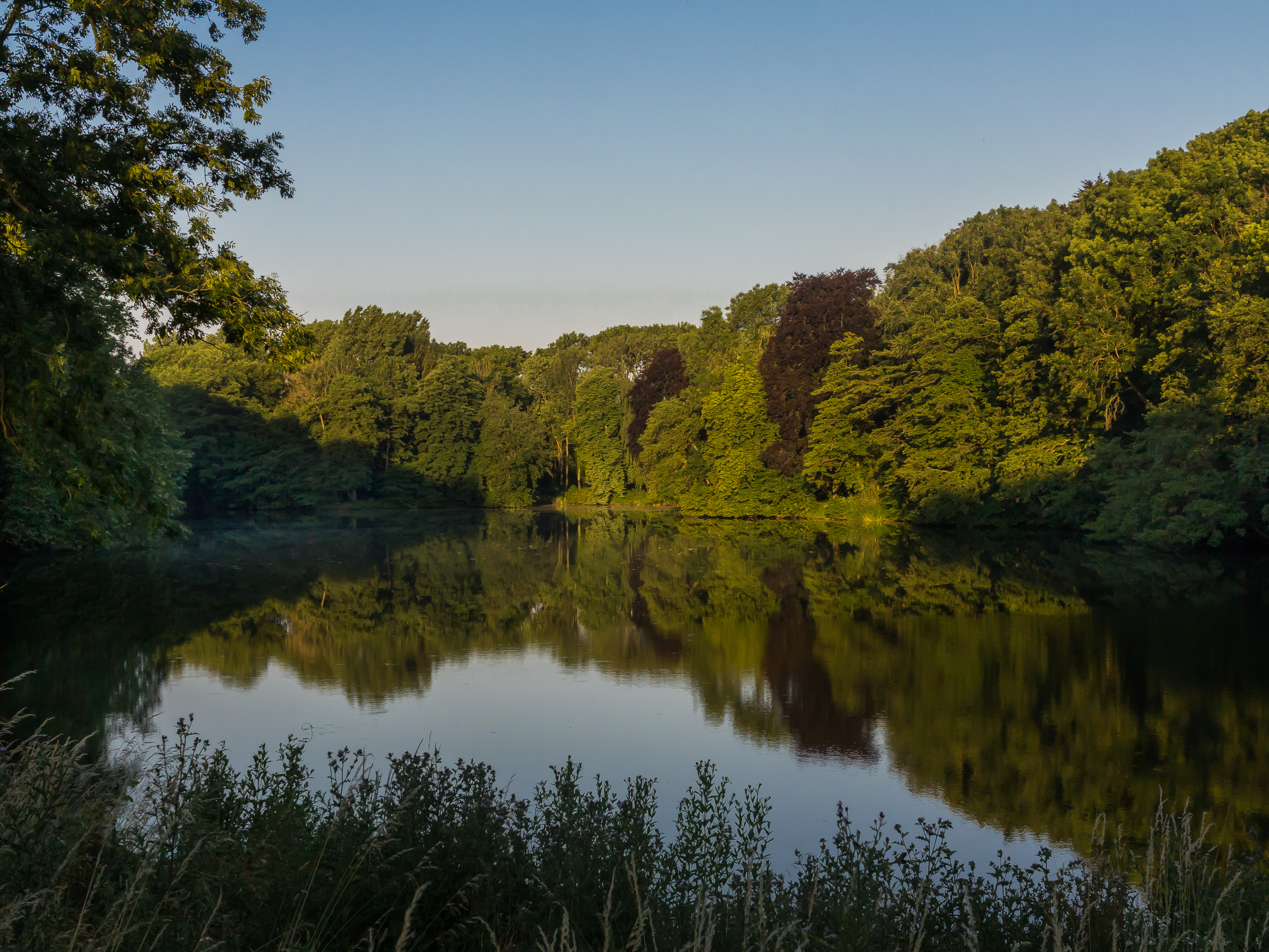
de Westerveldse Kolk - park near Drielsedijk
