= Aam =

Hamlet in Gelderland, Netherlands

- Aam
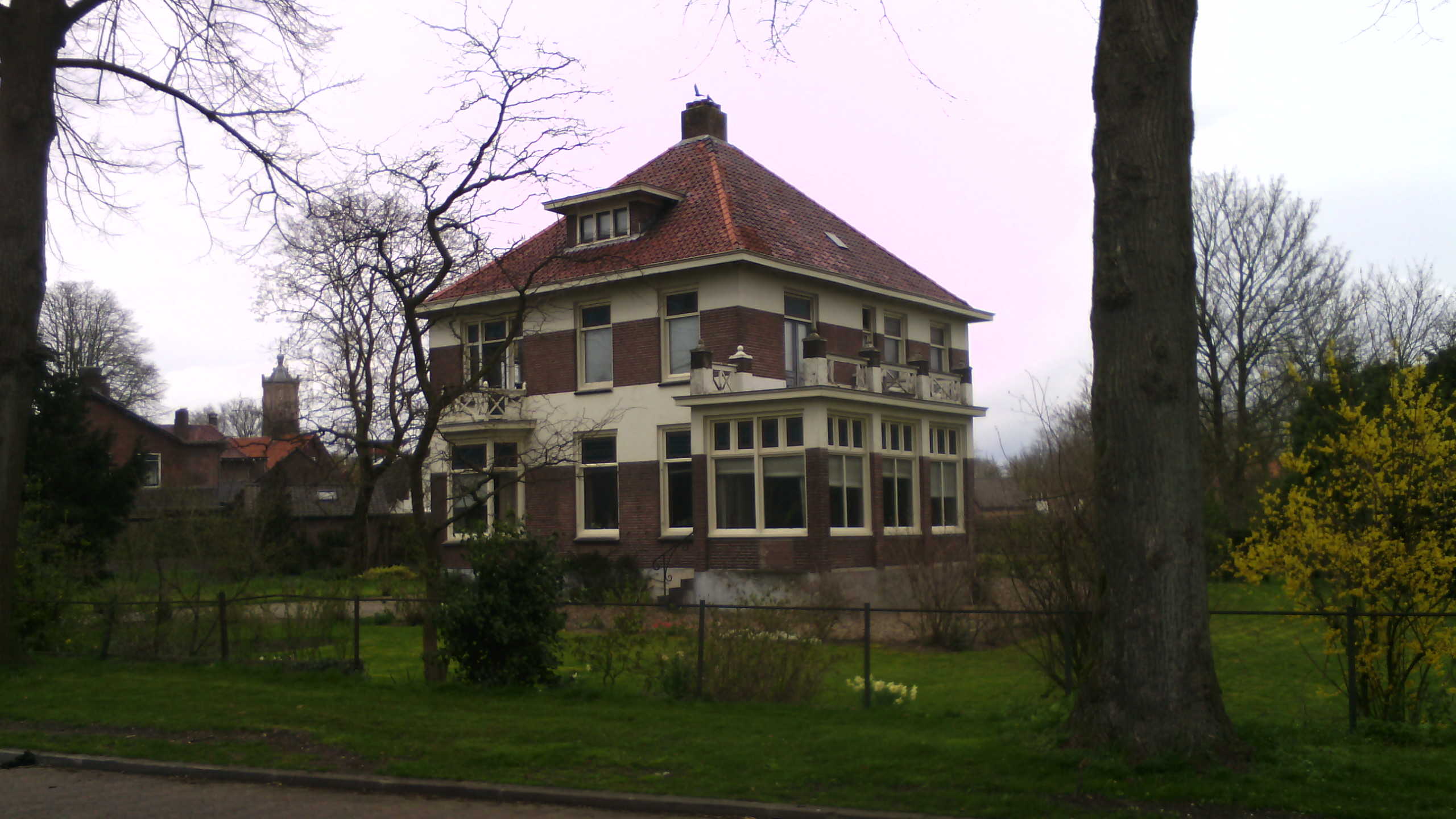
- House in Aam

- Location in the Netherlands Aam (Netherlands)
- Coordinates: 51.9153°N 5.8620°E
- Country: Netherlands
- Province: Gelderland
- Municipality: Overbetuwe

Area
  - Total: 1.52 km^{2} (0.59 sq mi)
- Elevation: 9 m (30 ft)

Population (2021)
  - Total: 135
  - Density: 88.8/km^{2} (230/sq mi)
- Time zone: UTC+1 (CET)
  - Summer (DST): UTC+2 (CEST)
- Postal code: 6662
- Dialing code: 0488

Aam is a hamlet in the Dutch province of Gelderland. It is located in the municipality of Overbetuwe, about 1 km east of the town of Elst. The hamlet is nowadays surrounded by Elst.

It was first mentioned in the 11th century as apud Ambam, and refers to the Amba river. In 1840, it was home to 182 people.
