= Rijkerswoerd =

City district in Arnhem, Netherlands

Coordinates: 51°56′37″N 5°53′29″E

Rijkerswoerd is a new city district in Arnhem, Netherlands, located in the southeastern part of the city between the 'Huissensedijk, A325 / Nijmeegseweg' and the community of Elst. The city district consists of four neighbourhoods: Rijkerswoerd-East, Rijkerswoerd-Middle, Rijkerswoerd-West and 'de Overmaat', where various enterprises are located. Rijkerswoerd is surrounded on three sides by a 'buffer' zone and fields. In Rijkerswoerd are about 5200 houses that accommodate over 13.000 inhabitants. The city district was completed in 2001 with the apartment complex 'Het Bastion'. There are shops, elementary schools, a sports park and an educational farm, 'De Korenmaat'.
