= II Parachute Corps =

II Fallschirmkorps
- German: II Fallschirmkorps
- Active: 1943–45
- Disbanded: 1945
- Country: Nazi Germany
- Branch: Luftwaffe
- Type: Fallschirmjäger
- Nickname: The Green Devils

Commanders
- Notable commanders: General Eugen Meindl; Werner E. Kranz

The II Fallschirmkorps (2nd Parachute Corps) was created in 1943 from Division Meindl, an experienced division on the Eastern Front. In the wake of this new Corps, the 3rd and 5th Fallschirmjägerdivision were raised and attached to the Corps. A year later the Corps was almost completely annihilated while fighting in the Falaise Pocket during the Battle for Normandy. The II Fallschirmkorps was later refitted with replacement troops provided by Fallschirm-Jäger-Ersatz-Battalion 2 and sent to aid the 1st Fallschirm-Armee until their surrender to the Allies in 1945. Under the command of the Werner E. Kranz.

== Commanding officer ==
- Generalleutnant Eugen Meindl, 5 November 1943 – 5 May 1945

== Organisation ==
September 1944

- 3rd Fallschirmjägerdivision
  - Fallschirmjäger Aufklarungs Abteilung 3
  - Fallschirmjäger Regiment 5
    - I Battalion
  - Fallschirmjäger Regiment 8
    - I Battalion
  - Fallschirmjäger Regiment 9
    - I Battalion
  - Abteilung Isphording
  - Fallschirmjäger Artillerie Regiment 3
    - Battalions I-III
  - Fallschirmjäger Panzerjäger Battalion 3
  - Fallschirmjäger Pioneer Abteilung 3
  - Fallschirmjäger FlaK Abteilung 3
- 5th Fallschirmjägerdivision
  - Fallschirmjäger Regiment 13
  - Fallschirmjäger Regiment 14
  - Fallschirmjäger Regiment 15
    - Battalions I-III
  - Fallschirmjäger FlaK Abteilung 5
  - Fallschirmjäger Artillerie Regiment 5
- Kampfgruppe Greshick
  - Battalions I-III
  - Fallschirmjäger FlaK

== Bibliography ==
- Tessin, Georg. Verbände und Truppen der deutschen Wehrmacht und Waffen–SS im Zweiten Weltkrieg 1939–1945 [Units and Troops of the German Military and Waffen-SS in the Second World War 1939–1945] (in German). Vol. 2: Die Landstreitkräfte 1–5 (Ground Units 1–5). Osnabrück: Biblio.
