= Haalderen =

- Village
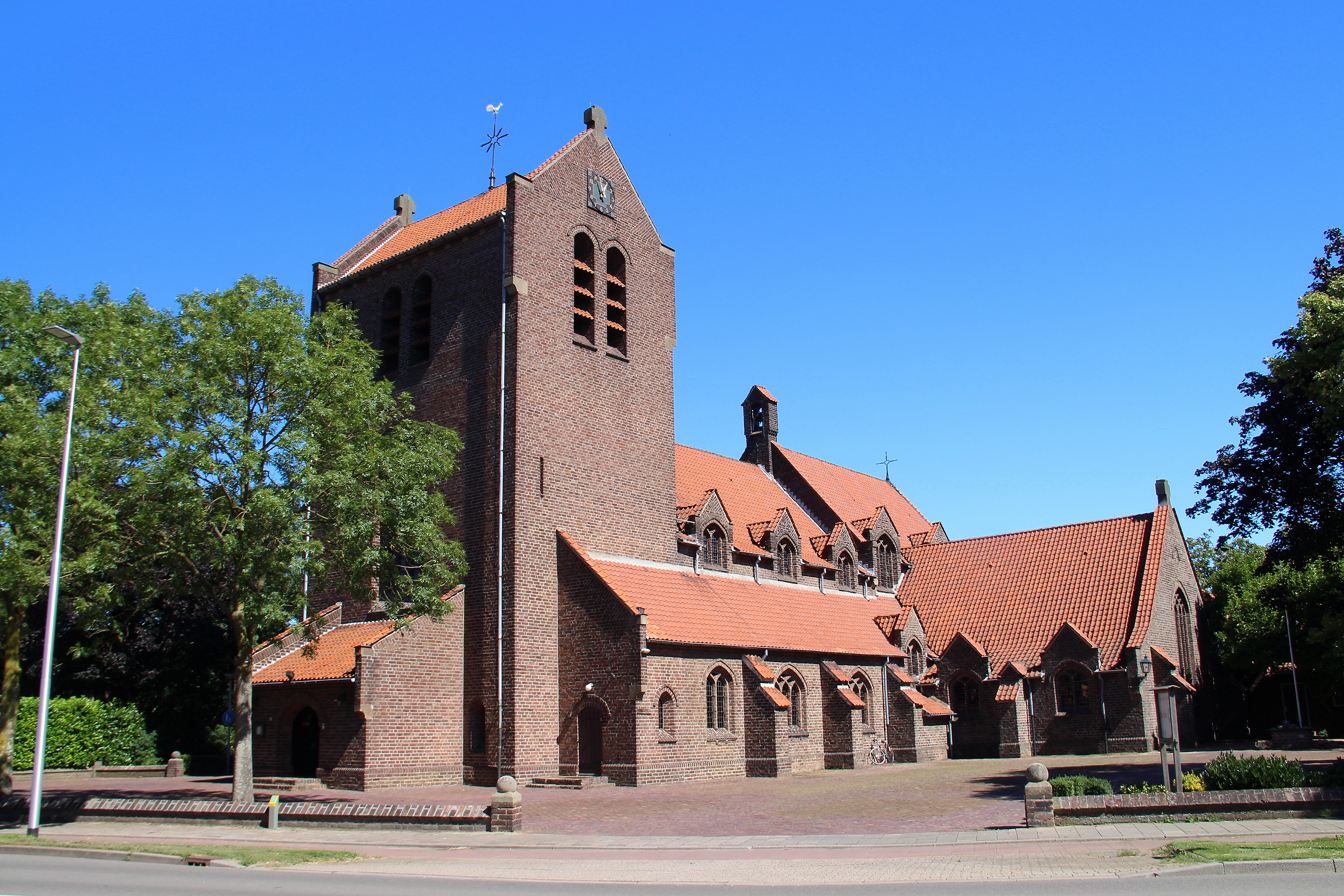
- OLV van Zeven Smartenkerk (church of Haalderen)

- Location in the province of Gelderland in the Netherlands Haalderen (Netherlands)
- Coordinates: 51°53′12″N 5°55′48″E
- Country: Netherlands
- Province: Gelderland
- Municipality: Lingewaard

Area
  - Total: 2.55 km^{2} (0.98 sq mi)
- Elevation: 9 m (30 ft)

Population (2020)
  - Total: 2,061
  - Density: 808/km^{2} (2,090/sq mi)
- Demonym: Haaldernaar

Haalderen (Dutch pronunciation: [ˈɦaːldərə(n)]) is a village in the Netherlands, in the province of Gelderland. The village is located in the Betuwe region, and belongs to the municipality of Lingewaard. Haalderen is situated along the rivers Waal and Linge. It has a population of 2,061 (1 January 2020).

== Physical geography ==
The territory of Haalderen is mainly located on river deposits. In the southwest of Haalderen there are river forelands of the Waal. Due to several levee breaches in the past, tree kolk lakes (named Kleine Kolk Grote Kolk and Groene Kolk) are still clearly visible in the current landscape of Haalderen. There is also a kolk lake in the border area of Haalderen and Bemmel (named Ronduit). Typical herbs that grow along the kolks of Haalderen are Inula britannica and Limosella aquatica.

== Education ==
The village has one primary school: IKC De Wieling. The school has about 250 pupils.

== Notable people ==
- Herman Gerdsen (Haalderen, 16 July 1953 — Nijmegen, 23 March 2024), Dutch Professional football player of Vitesse and NEC Nijmegen.
- Joop Puntman (Haalderen, 20 March 1934 — Nijmegen, 12 December 2013), Dutch ceramist and sculptor.

== Local sights ==
Local places of interest in Haalderen include:

- OLV van Zeven Smartenkerk - The church of the village (a Catholic church)
- Hertenkamp Haalderen - A small deer park near the church, in the middle of the village
- Kleine Kolk, Grote Kolk and Groene Kolk - The three main kolk lakes of Haalderen (remnants of the levee failures)
- Haalders Bos - A small woodlot in the southwest of the village

== Photo gallery ==
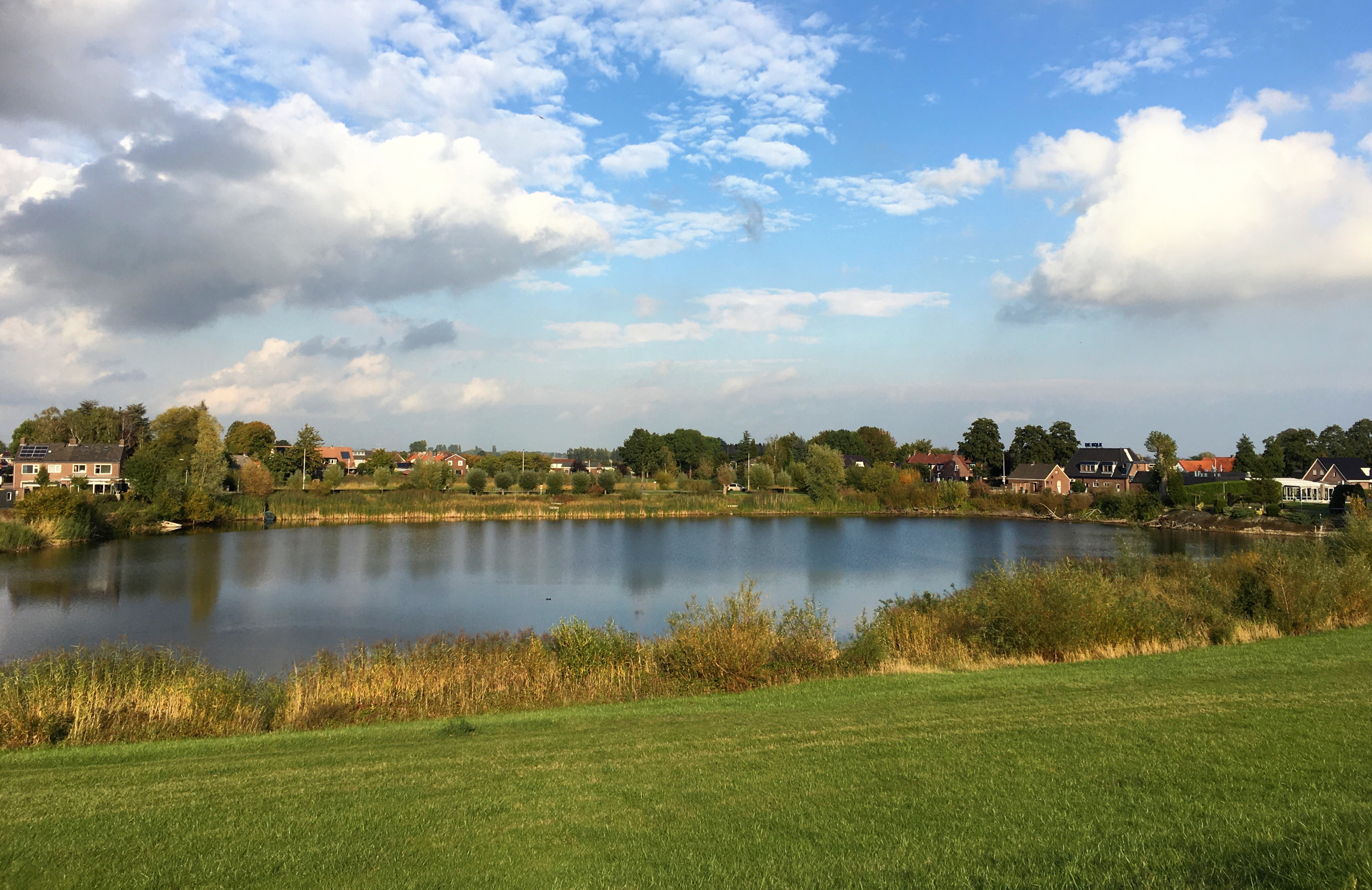
Kleine Kolk (kolk lake)

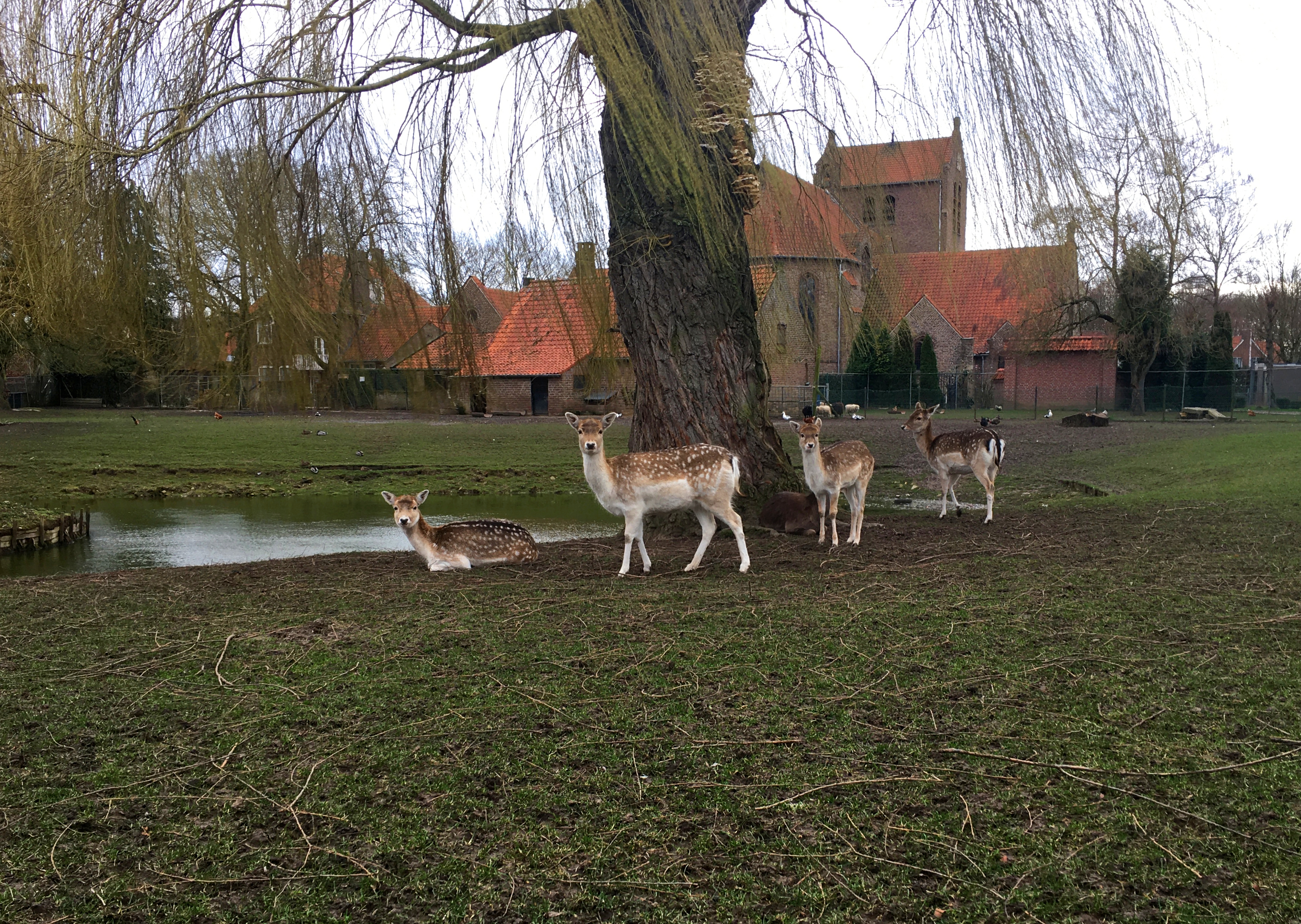
Hertenkamp Haalderen

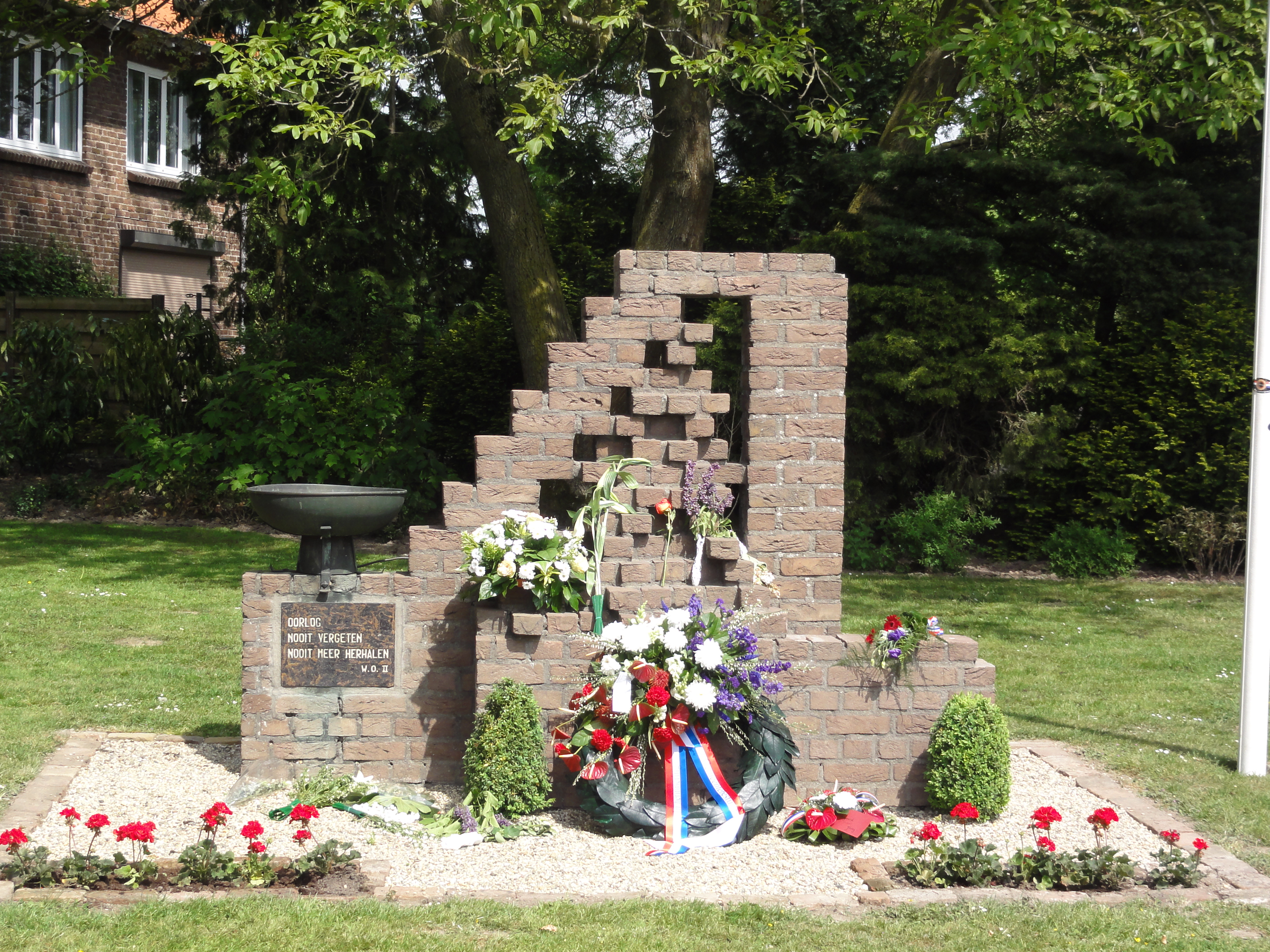
The war memorial

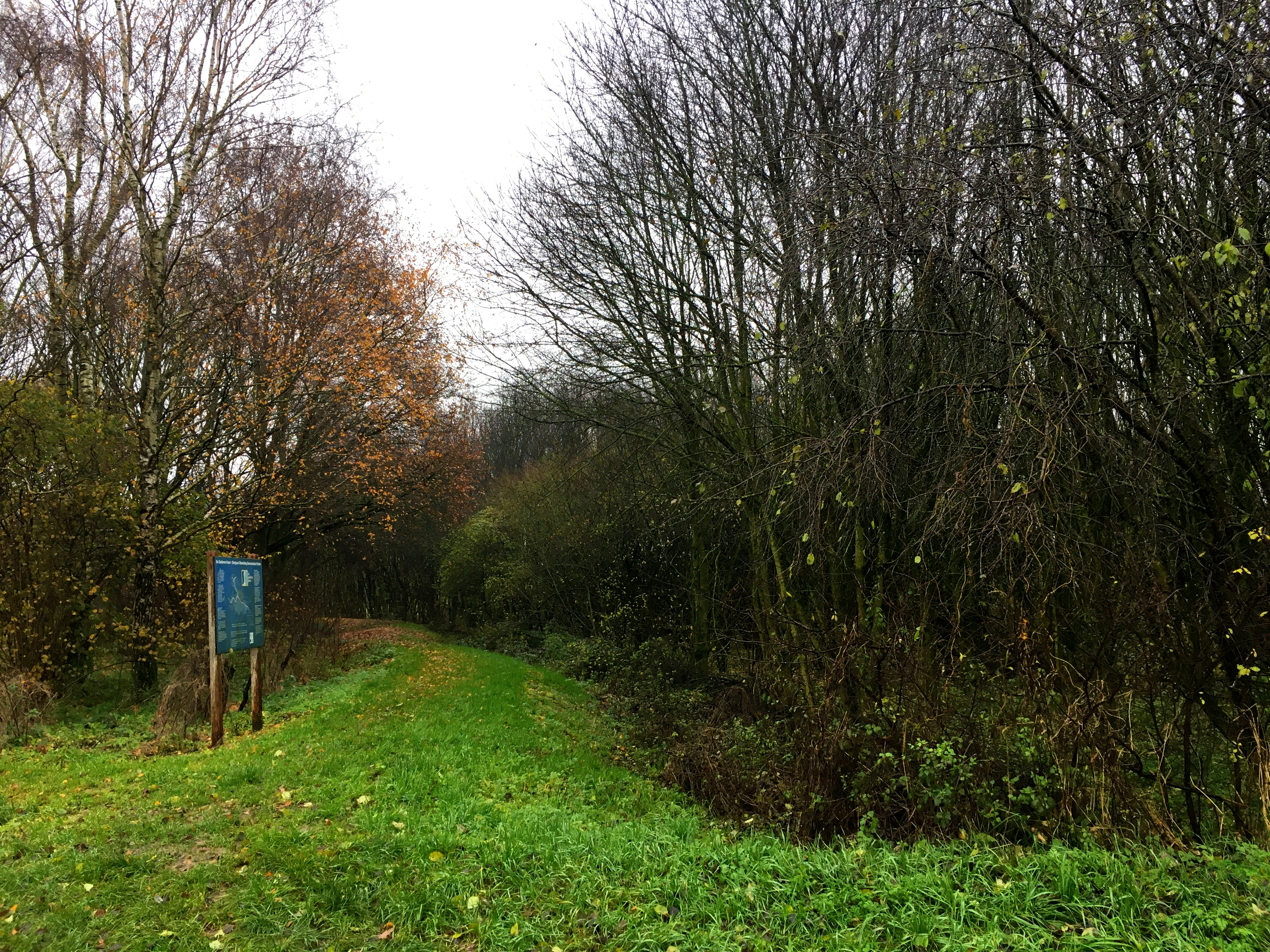
Haalders Bos

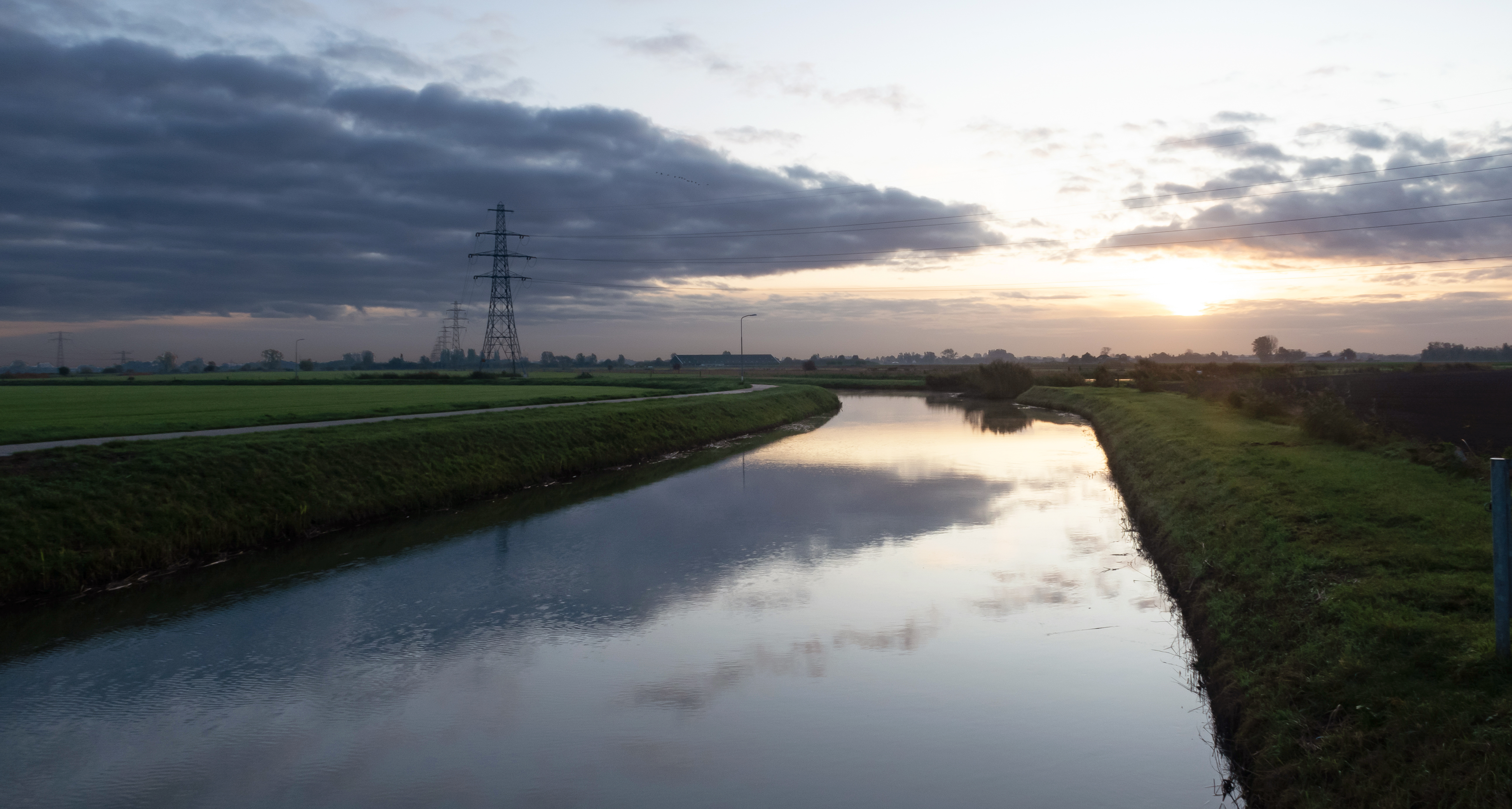
The Linge river
