= Bemmel (disambiguation) =

Bemmel is a town in the Netherlands.

Bemmel may refer to:

== People ==
- Ab van Bemmel (1912–1986), Dutch boxer
- Adriaan Cornelis Valentin van Bemmel (1908–1990), Dutch zoologist
- Eugène Van Bemmel (1824–1880), Belgian author
- Jan van Bemmel (born 1938), Dutch professor
- Jhim van Bemmel (born 1959), Dutch politician
- Peter von Bemmel (1686–1754), German artist
- Willem van Bemmel (1630–1708), Dutch painter

== Other uses ==
- Bemmel Theaterchurch, theater and former church in the Netherlands
- Lekdetec Bemmel, Dutch basketball team
