= Doornik, Gelderland =

Doornik
- Hamlet
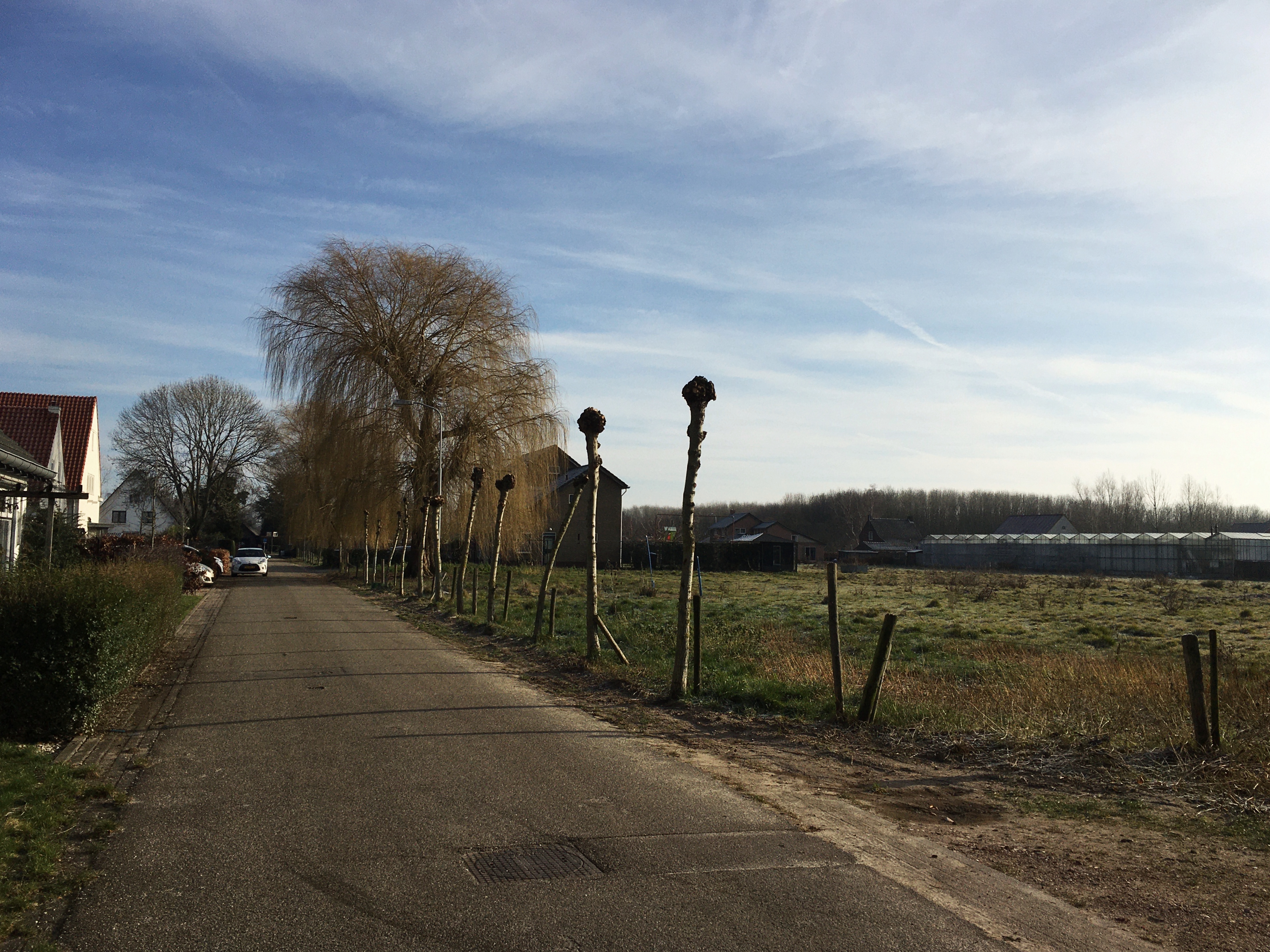
- Street view

- Location in the Netherlands Doornik (Netherlands)
- Coordinates: 51.8722°N 5.8789°E
- Country: Netherlands
- Province: Gelderland
- Municipality: Heerde
- Elevation: 9 m (30 ft)
- Time zone: UTC+1 (CET)
  - Summer (DST): UTC+2 (CEST)
- Postal code: 6681
- Dialing code: 0418

Doornik is a hamlet in the municipality of Lingewaard, between Lent and Bemmel, in the province of Gelderland, the Netherlands. Most of Doornik was destroyed at a Dyke breach in 1799, the village never recovered. Doornik had its own castle which burned down in 1823.

== History ==
It was first mentioned at the end of 11th century as apud Tornacum. The etymology is unknown. Doornik is not a statistical entity, and the postal authorities have placed it under Bemmel.

Doornik used to be an heerlijkheid together with Ressen. It was first mentioned in 1324 and had a castle. The castle had become derelict in 1649.

The town of Bemmel was threatened by the Waal and was flooded several times during the 16th century. In 1648, it was decided to dig a canal to eliminate the bend in the river. The new canal threatened Doornik, and in 1799, the dike breached destroying the village, farms and the castle. Doornik was never rebuilt except for a few farms.

In 1823, the remains of the castle were lost in a fire In 1827, a manor house was built in its place. During World War II, it was used by the Germans to store ammunition, and in 1944, everything exploded destroying the manor house. In 1840, Doornik was home to 94 people. Nowadays, it consists of a handful of houses.

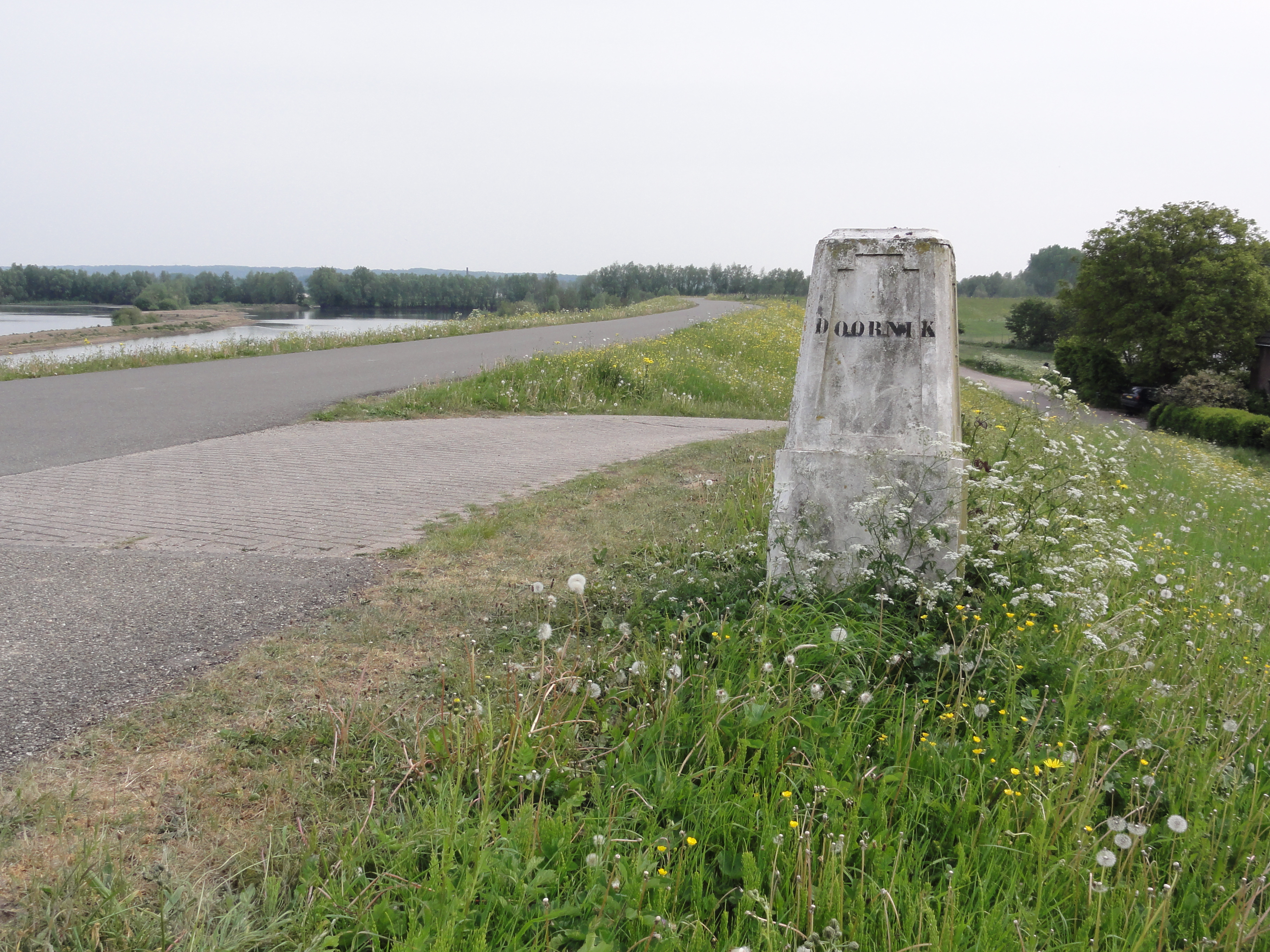
Border pole between Bemmel and Doornik

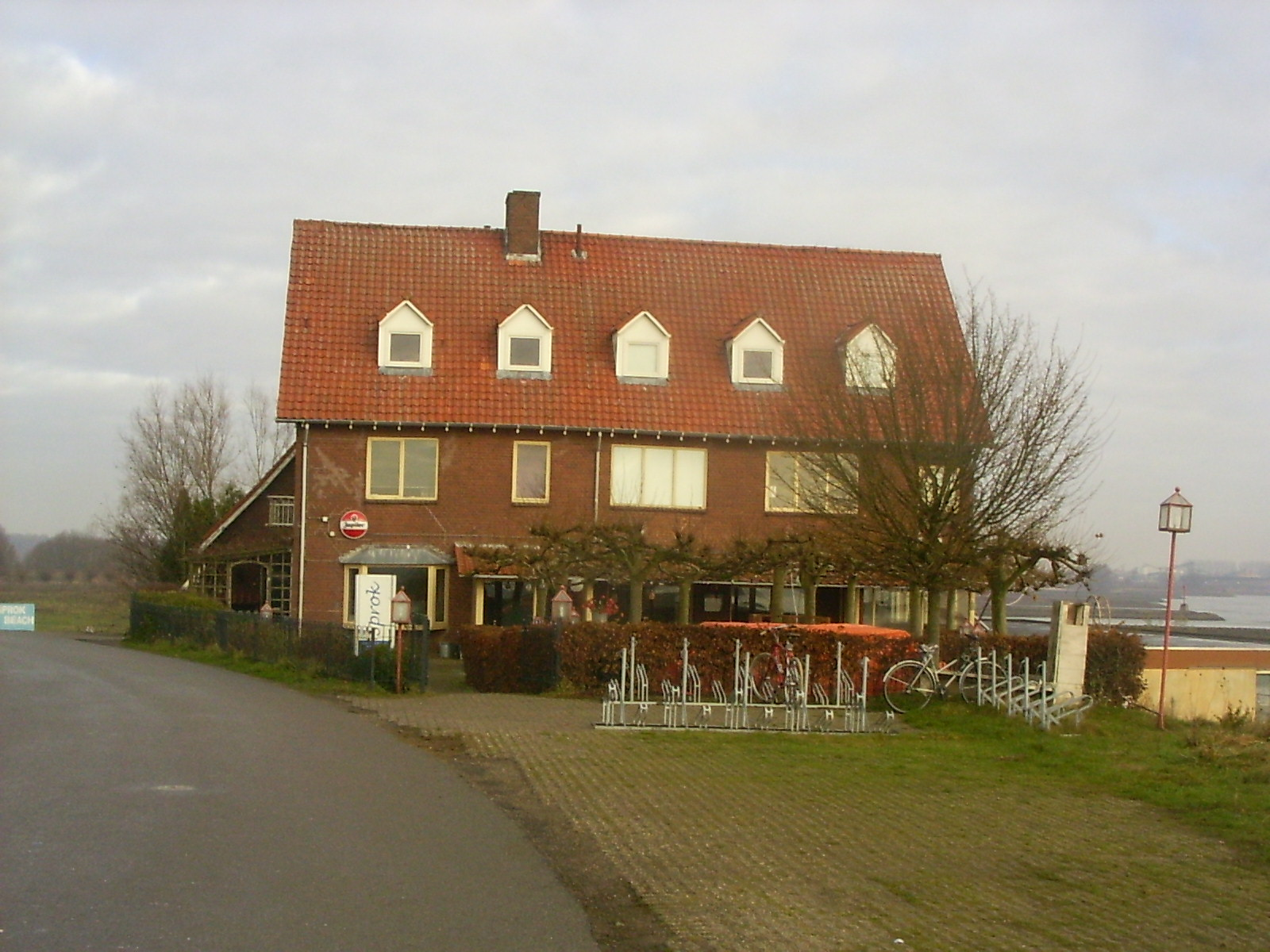
Pub in Doornik

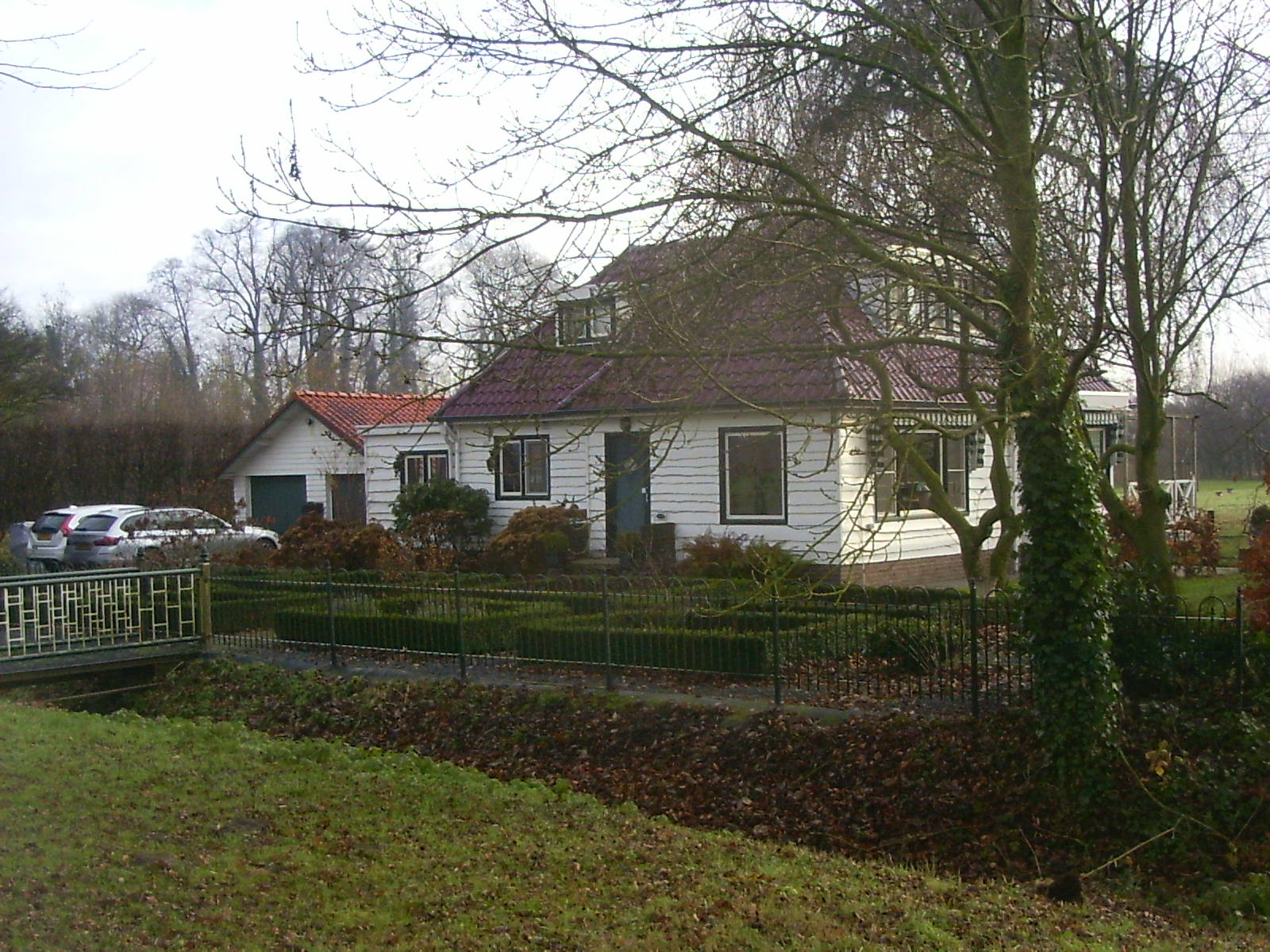
Farm in Doornik

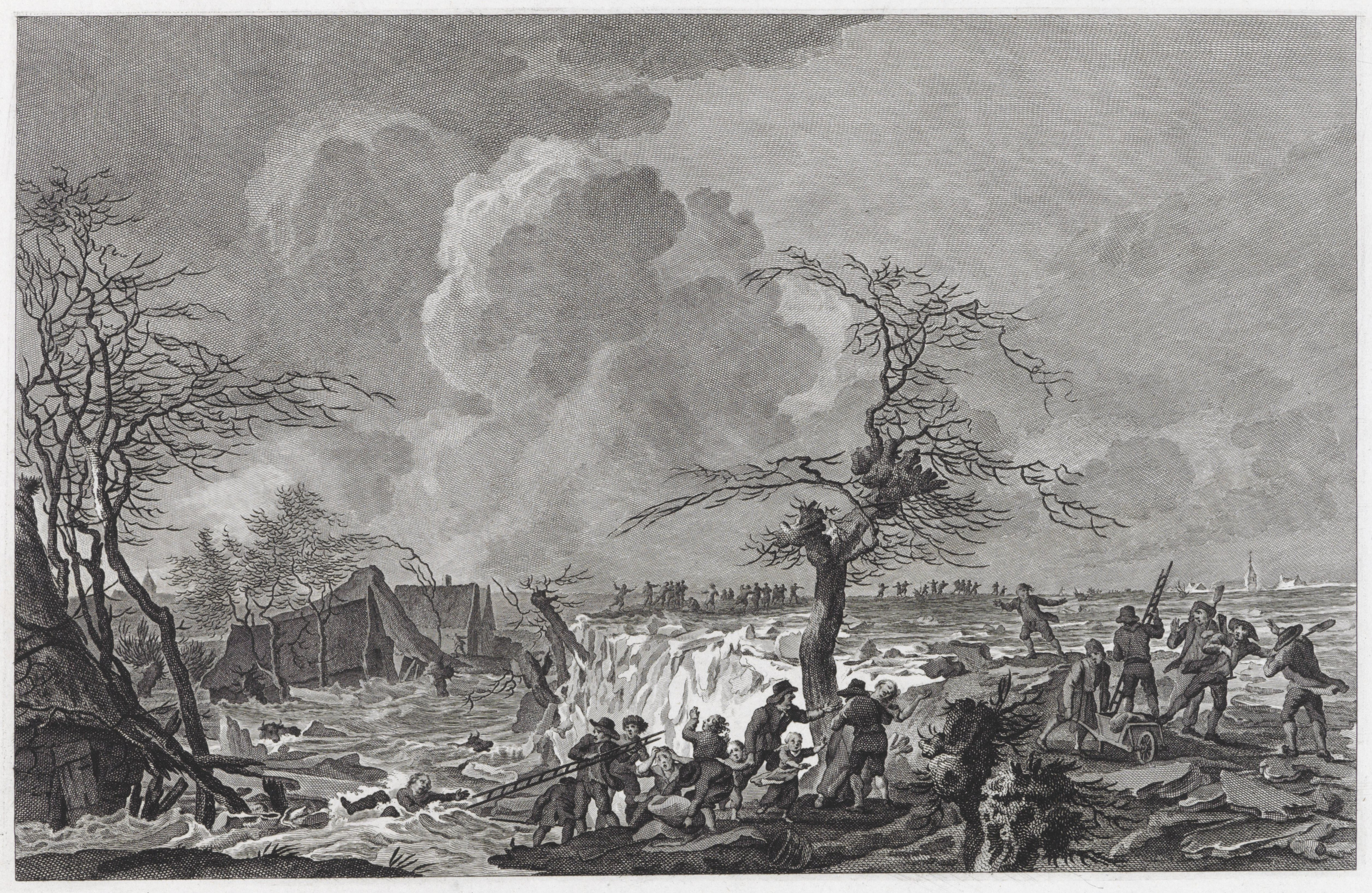
Painting of the 1799 dike breach
