= Cayfano Latupeirissa =

Dutch footballer (born 1991)

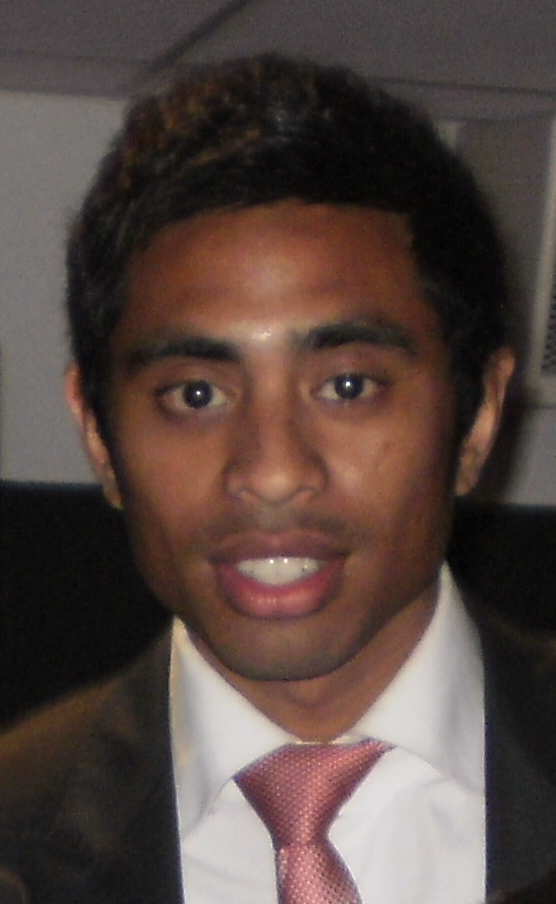

Personal information
- Date of birth: 28 April 1991 (age 35)
- Place of birth: Bemmel, Netherlands
- Height: 1.72 m (5 ft 8 in)
- Position: Winger

Youth career
- SC Bemmel
- 2004–2010: NEC

Senior career*
Years	Team	Apps	(Gls)
2010–2013	NEC	17	(0)
2012–2013	→ FC Oss (loan)	27	(4)
2013–2016	JVC Cuijk	71	(10)
2016–2018	GVVV	47	(9)
2018–2021	VVOG	49	(8)
Total		211	(31)

International career
2005–2006	Netherlands U15	3	(2)
2006–2007	Netherlands U16	5	(1)
2007	Netherlands U17	1	(0)
- * Club domestic league appearances and goals

Cayfano Latupeirissa (born 28 April 1991) is a Dutch former professional footballer who played as a winger. He most notably played for NEC.

== International career ==
Latupeirissahas represented the Netherlands at under-15, under-16 and under-17 level.
