= Bemmel =

- Town
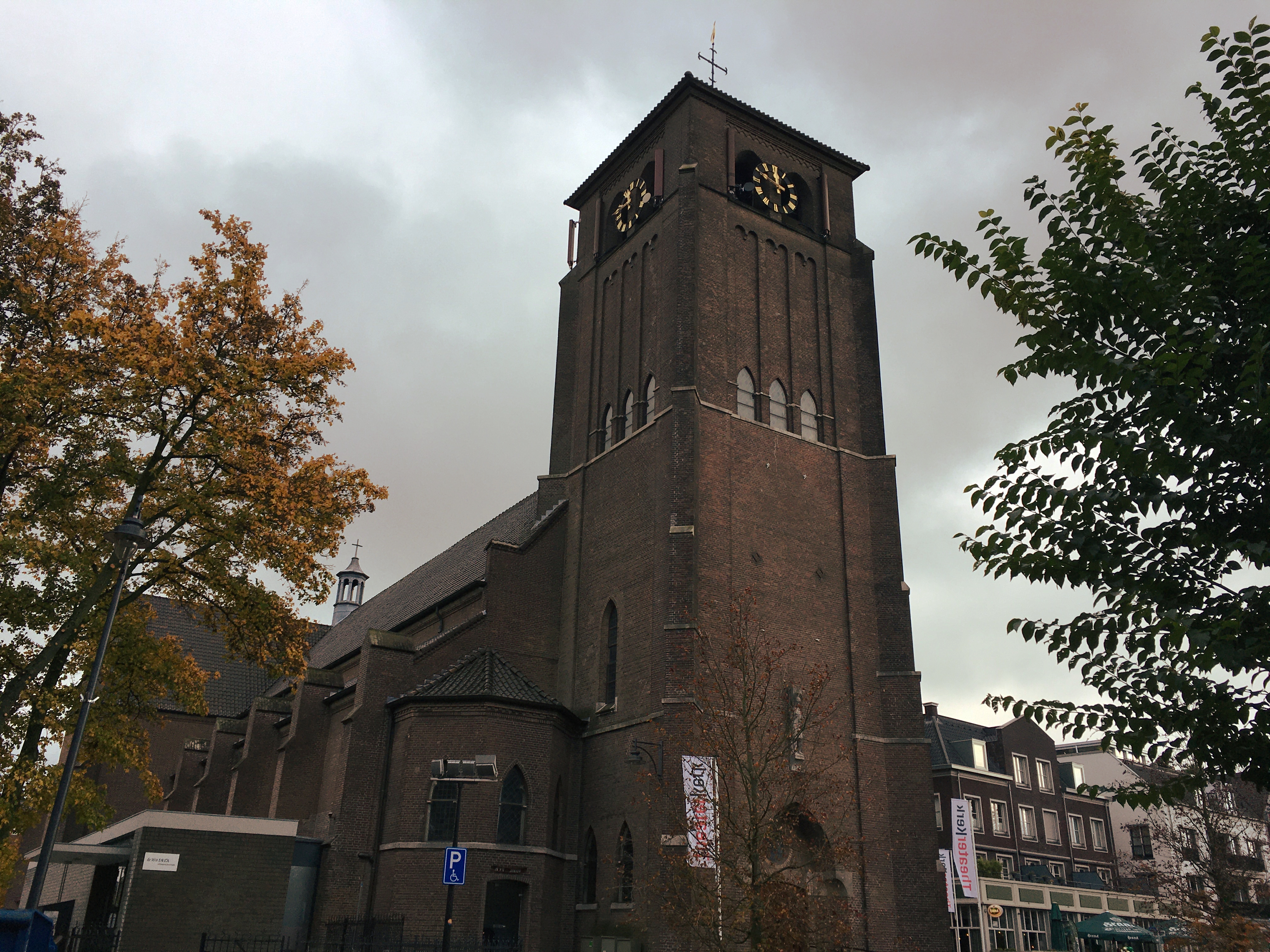
- Bemmel Theaterchurch

- Flag Coat of arms

- Location in the Netherlands Bemmel (Netherlands)
- Coordinates: 51°53′30″N 5°53′45″E
- Country: Netherlands
- Province: Gelderland
- Municipality: Lingewaard

Population (2020)
  - Total: 12,161
- Demonym: Bemmelaar
- Time zone: UTC+1 (CET)
  - Summer (DST): UTC+2 (CEST)
- Postcode: 6681
- Area code: 0481
- Major roads: A15
- Website: beleefbemmel.nl

Bemmel (Dutch pronunciation: [ˈbɛməl]) is a town in the eastern Netherlands, in the province of Gelderland. It is located in the Betuwe region, and falls under the municipality of Lingewaard. The town is situated between the major cities of Arnhem and Nijmegen, and is bordered by the Waal river in the south. Bemmel has a population of 12,161 (as of 1 January 2020).

== History ==
The former municipality of Bemmel merged in 2001 with the former municipalities Huissen and Gendt. In 2003 this merged municipality was renamed Lingewaard. The municipal building of Lingewaard is located in Bemmel.

From 1990 to 2006, Bemmel was considerably expanded with three new housing estates: Klaverkamp, Klein Rome, and Essenpas. The hamlets of Doornik and De Pas are also included with Bemmel. The hamlet of Vossenpels is partly included with Bemmel and partly included with Lent; which became part of the municipality of Nijmegen in 1998.

== Landscape ==
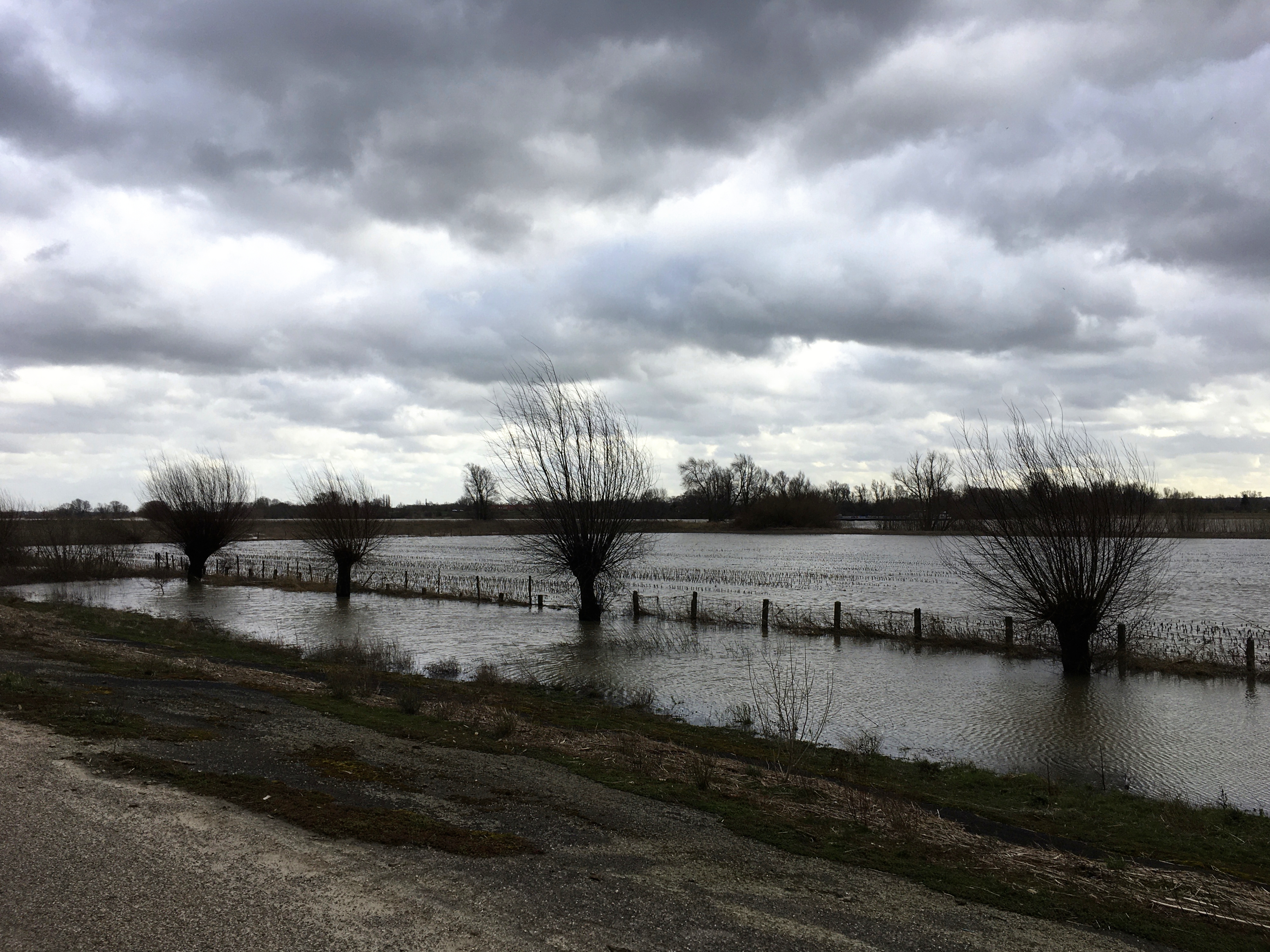
The floodplains of Bemmel during high water

Bemmel is located within the catchment area of the rivers Waal and Linge. It contains mainly fertile soils of nutrient-rich river deposits. The area is well suited for horticulture; it features many greenhouses and orchards.

In the south of Bemmel (outside the dykes) lies Dutch rewilding area the Gelderse Poort, which is managed by Staatsbosbeheer. The area contains typical habitats of the Dutch riverscapes, including: kolks, riparian forests and grasslands. There is a mining company located in the area, which extracts sand and gravel out of the ground.

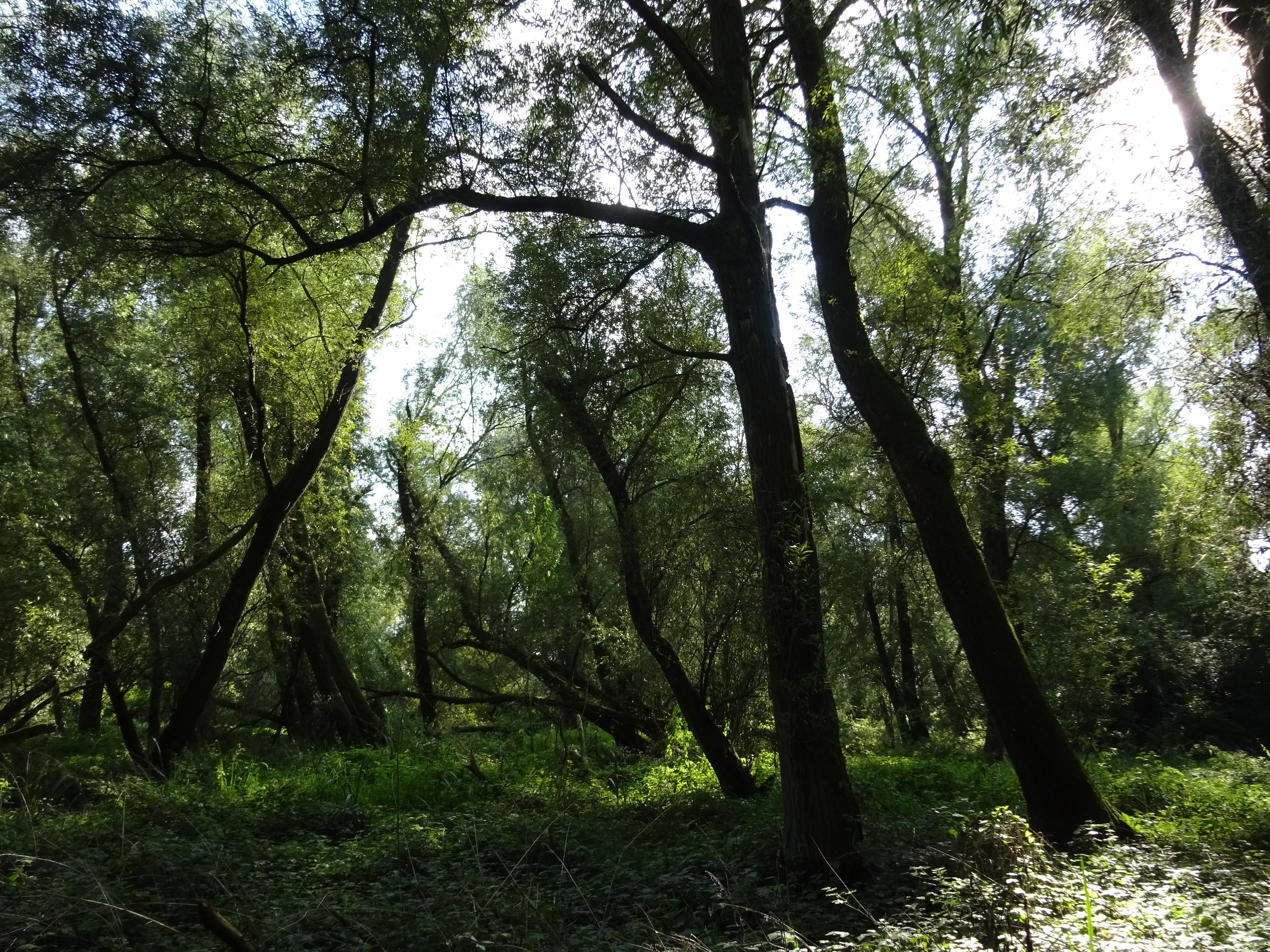
Riparian forests in the floodplains of Bemmel

Along and through the most western part of Bemmel runs Park Lingezegen. This is a Dutch landscape park, located between the cities of Arnhem and Nijmegen. The most notable part of Park Lingezegen that runs through Bemmel is the estate of Doornik. It is an important area for rare Dutch meadow birds, including the grey partridge, yellowhammer, and Eurasian skylark.

== Annual festivals ==
Notable annual festivals and events in Bemmel include:

- International Four Days Marches Nijmegen - A multiple day marching event in mid-July, which comes through Bemmel. Depending on the edition, it will be on the first or the fourth day.
- Bemmelse Dweildag - An international festival for marching bands in Bemmel, on the second Sunday in June.
- Horse Days of Bemmel (Dutch: Bemmelse Paardendagen) - The annual pony market and horserace of the town, around the second Sunday in August.

== Notable people ==
Notable residents in Bemmel include:

- Joop Puntman (1934–2013), Dutch ceramist and sculptor
- Cayfano Latupeirissa (born 1991), Dutch professional football player
- Jesse Schuurman (born 1998), Dutch professional football player
- Veerle Buurman (born 2006), Dutch professional football player

== Photo gallery ==
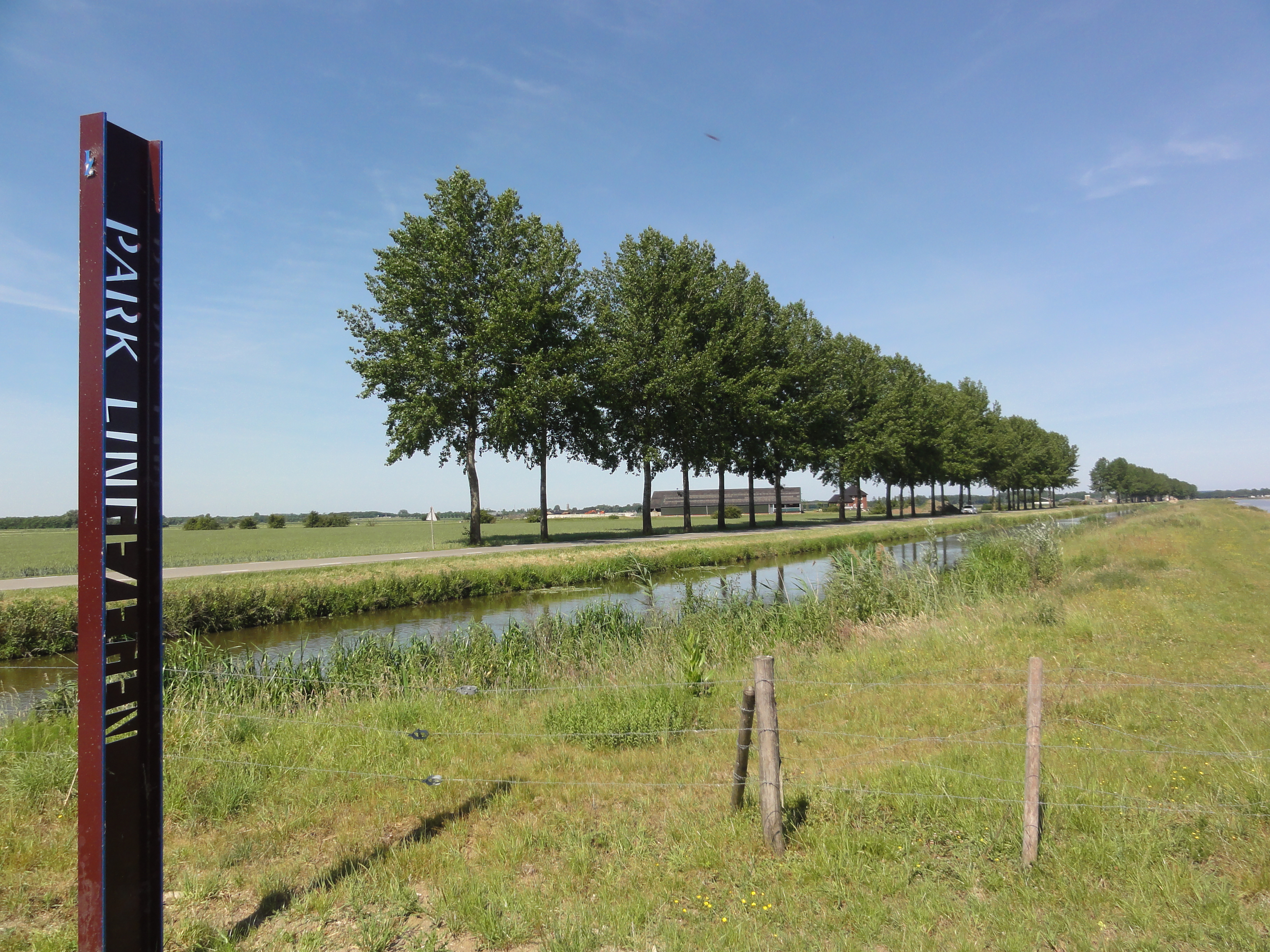
The Linge river at Park Lingezegen, Bemmel

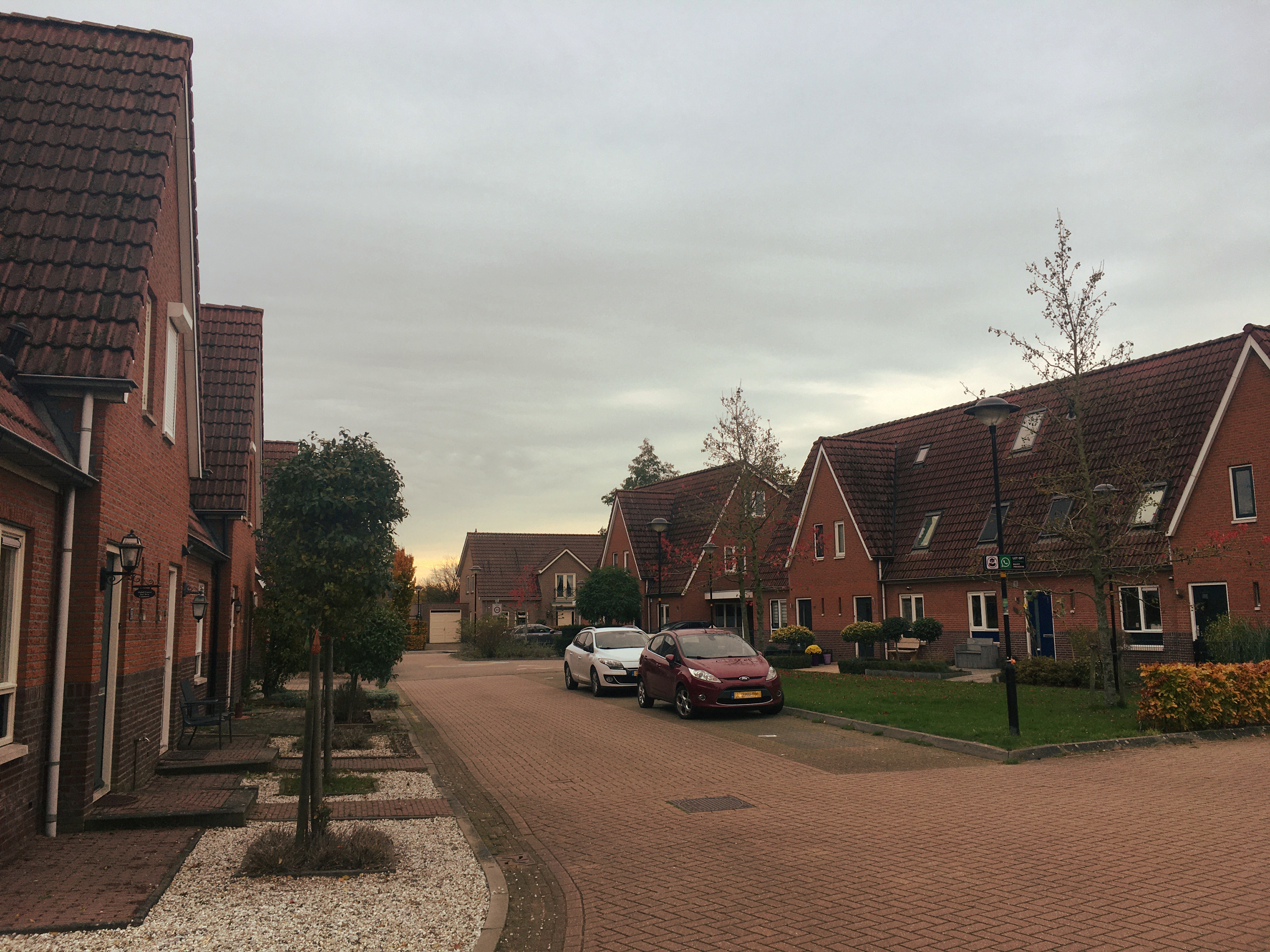
New housing estate the Essenpas, Bemmel

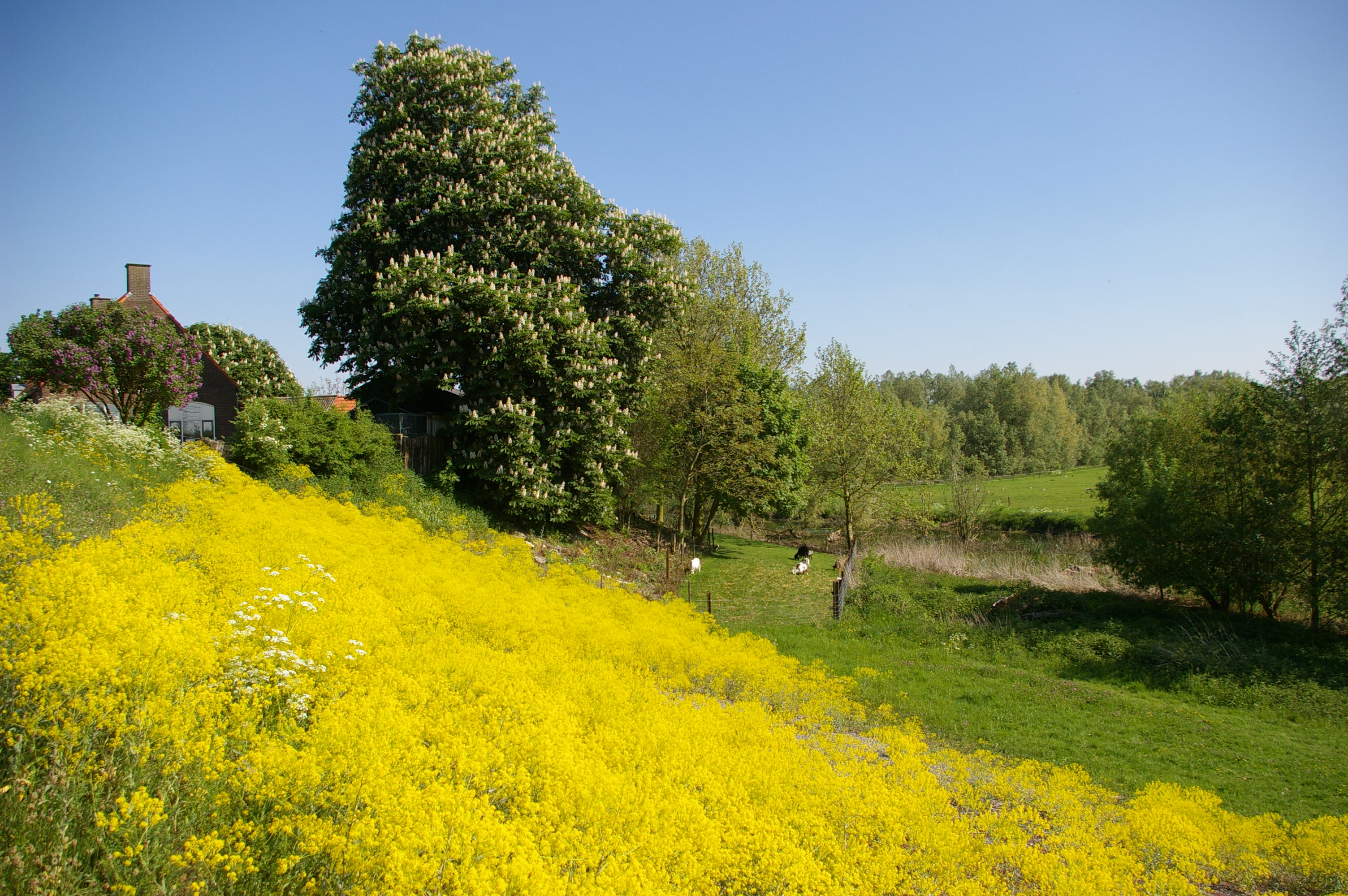
The Waaldike of Bemmel during springtime

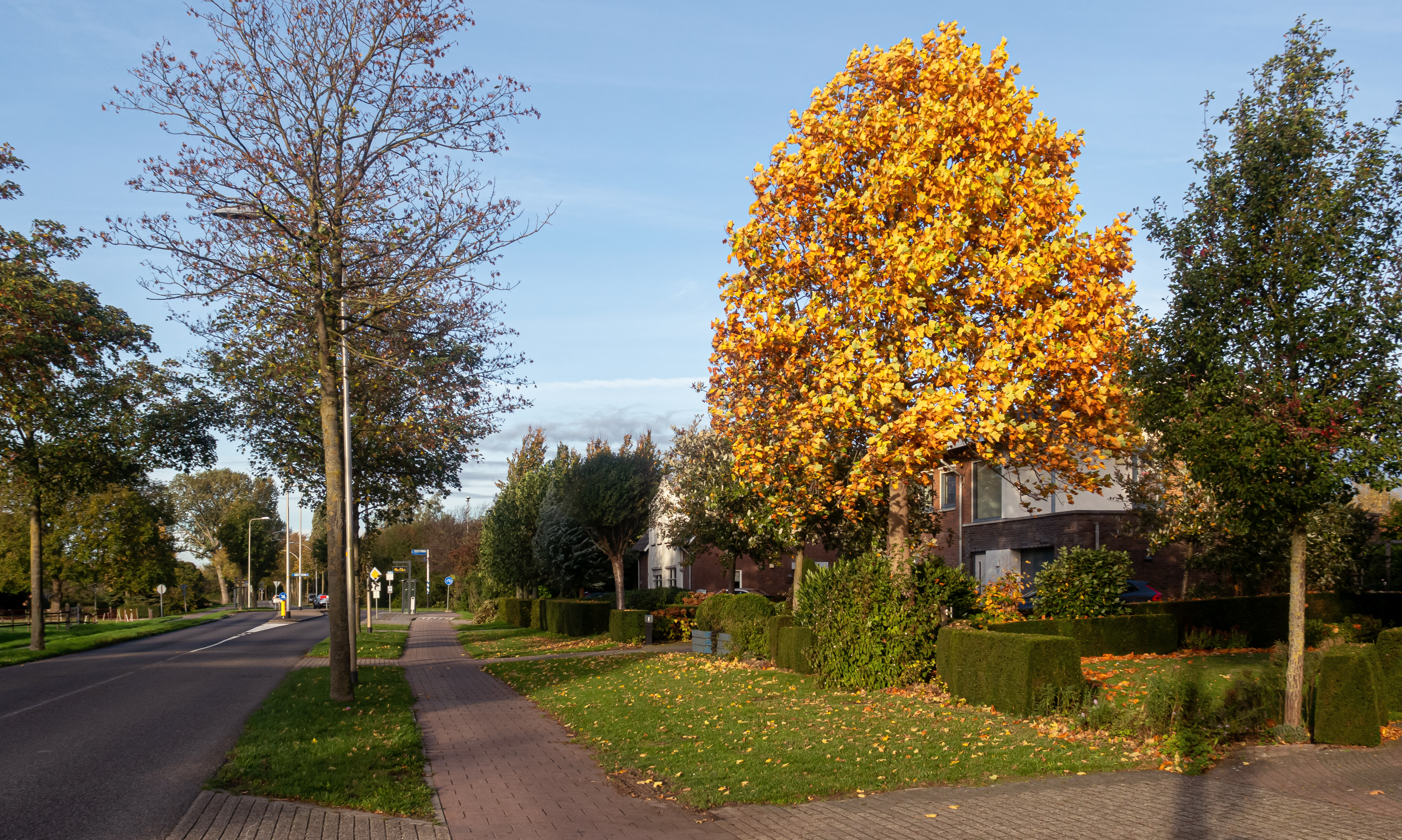
The Ressensestraat during autumn

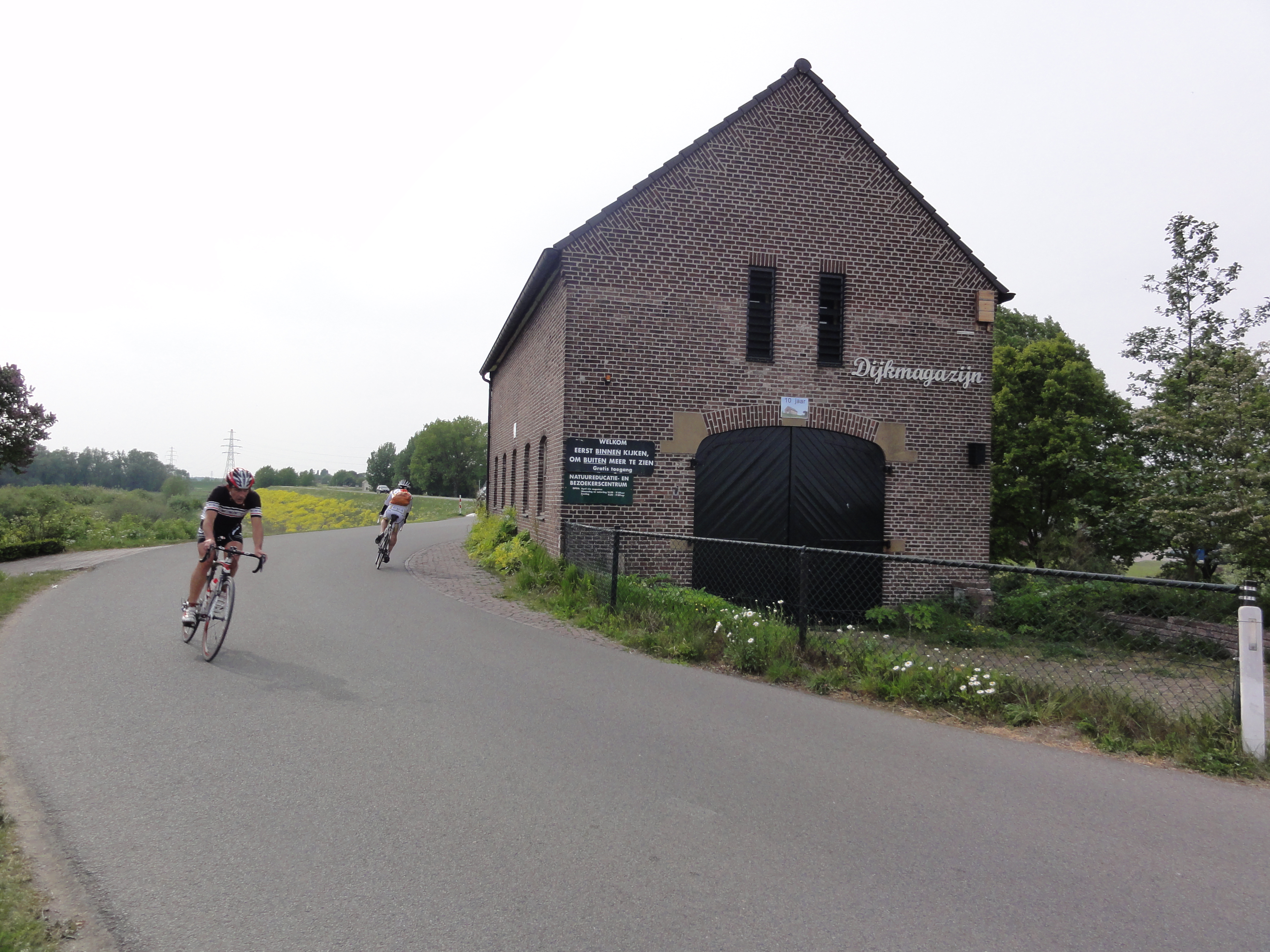
Dijkmagazijn Bemmel, visitor center for nature

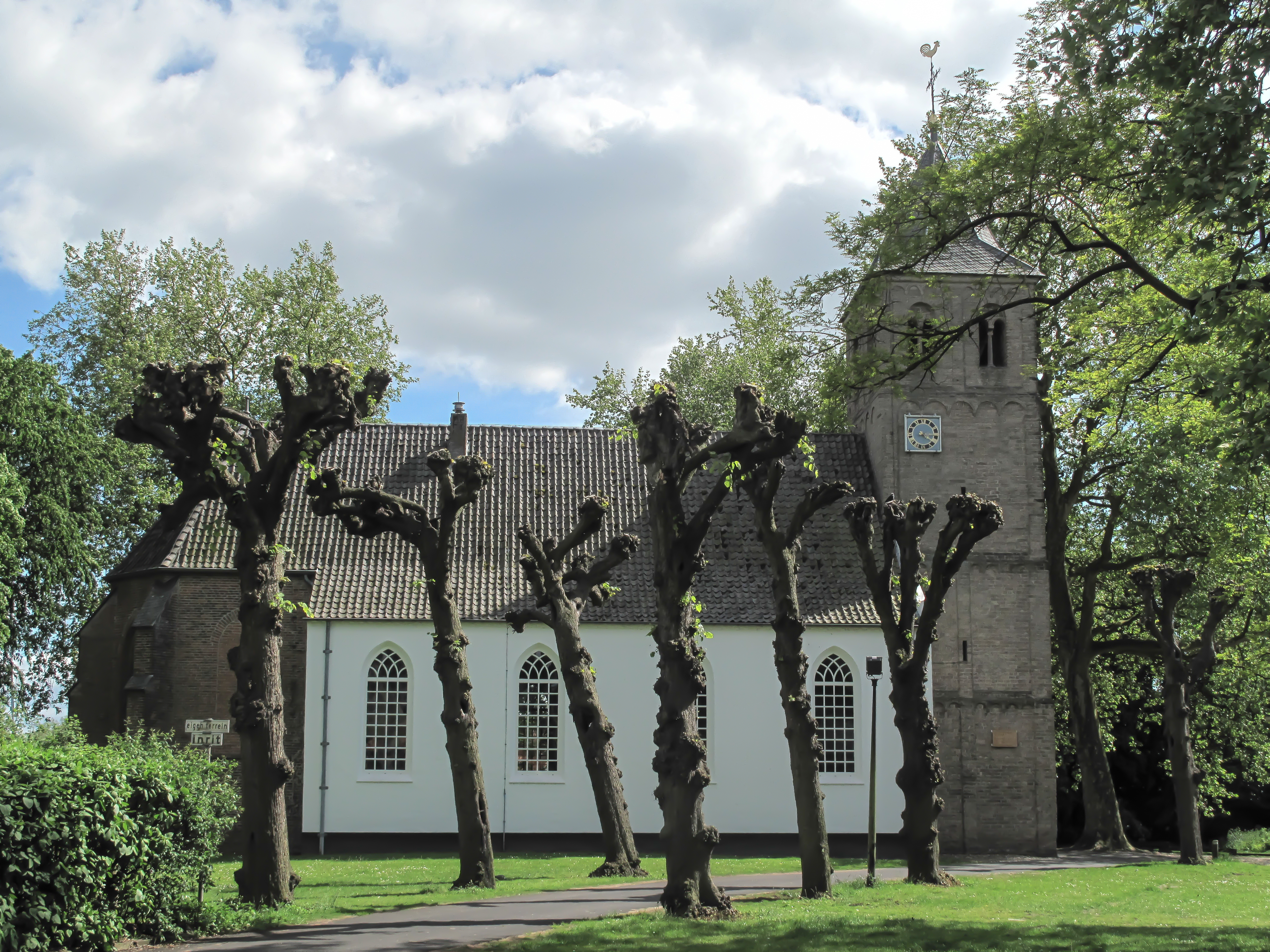
Protestant church of Bemmel (12th century)

== Education ==
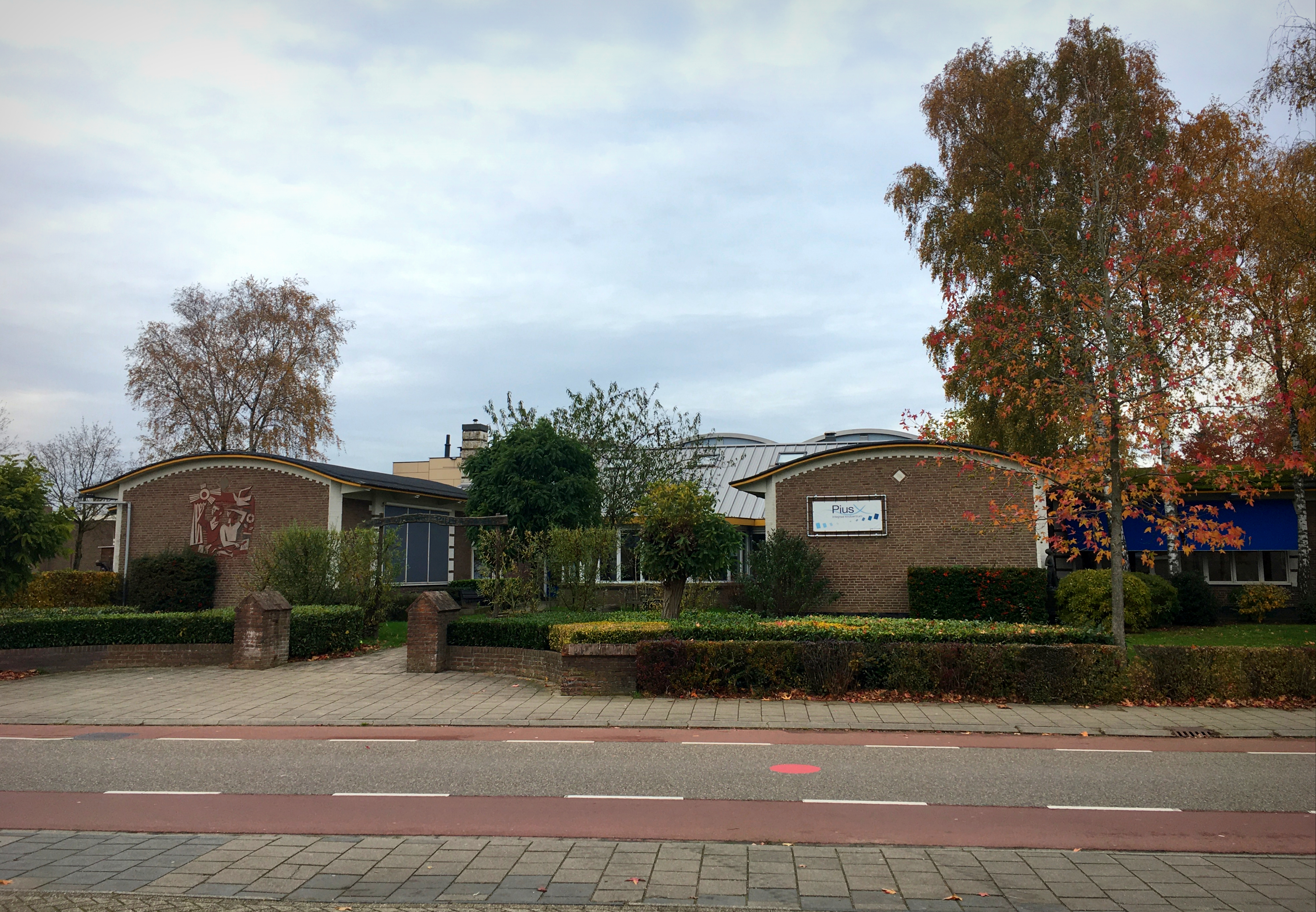
Primary school 'Pius X' in Bemmel

The following educational institutions are located in Bemmel:

Name	Type of institution
Over Betuwe College	High school
Pro College Bemmel	Vocational school
Pius X	Primary school
Borgwal	Primary school
Regenboog	Primary school
Donatushof	Primary school
De Vlinderboom	Primary school

== Sport ==
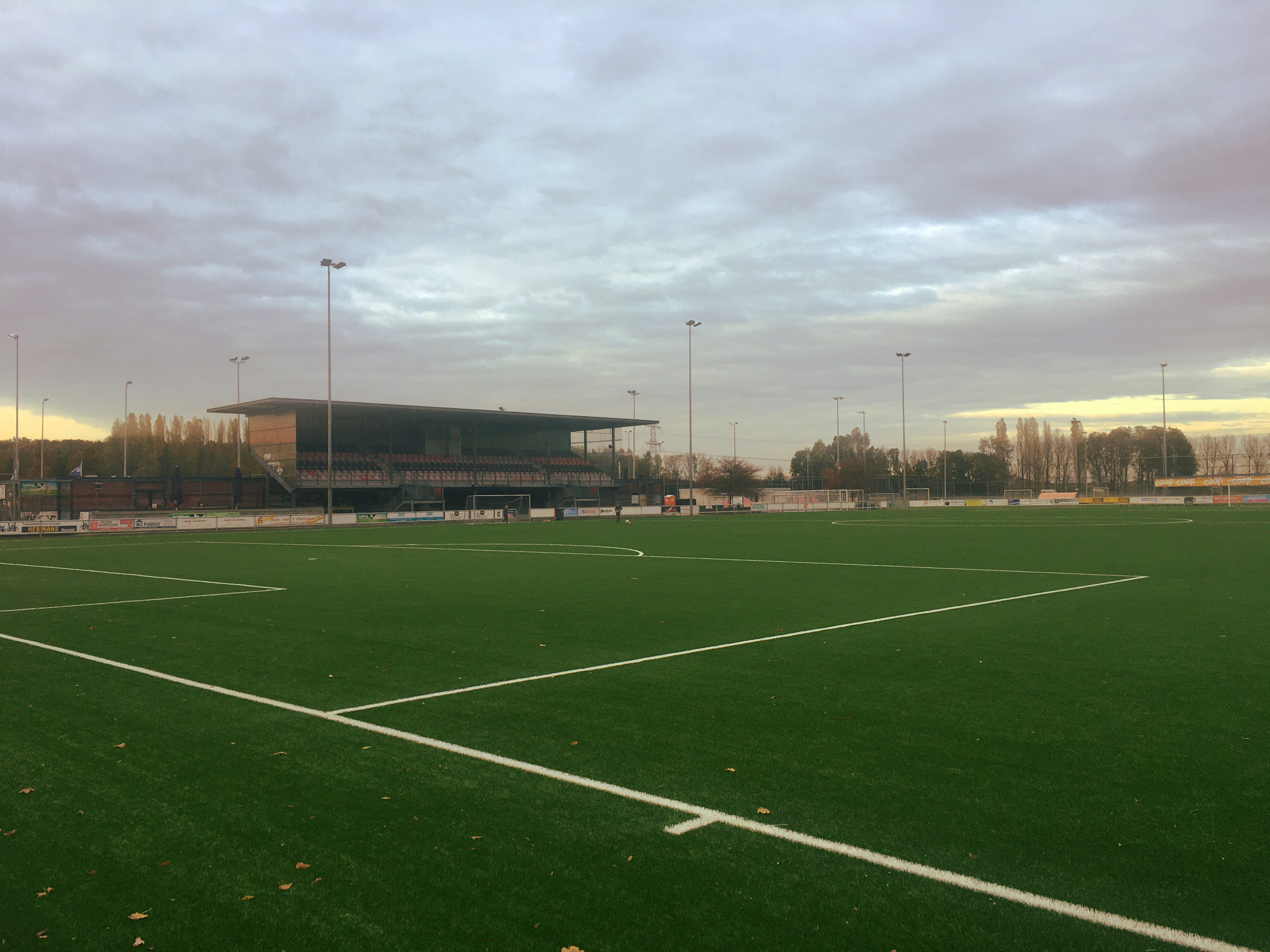
The football stadium of SC Bemmel

Yoast United is a professional basketball team located in Bemmel, playing in the national highest level Dutch Basketball League. The following sport facilities are located in Bemmel:

Name	Type of sport
Yoast United	Basketball
SC Bemmel	Football
MHC Bemmel	Hockey
BV Batouwe	Basketball
Tennisclub Bemmel	Tennis
De Schaapskooi	Physical fitness
TWC 't Verzetje	Cycle sport
Vereniging Kidang	Volleyball
BC Bemmel 72	Badminton
Rugbyclub Betuwe	Rugby football
Ki-Aikido Bemmel	Aikido

== Trivia ==
- Bemmel is often called "Bemmely Hills" by its younger residents. This nickname for the town is often used on social media and is probably derived from the name of the American city Beverly Hills.
- The alternative name of Bemmel during carnaval is: 't Kaokelnest (English: The Cackle Nest)
