= Bemmel Theaterchurch =

- Theaterkerk Bemmel
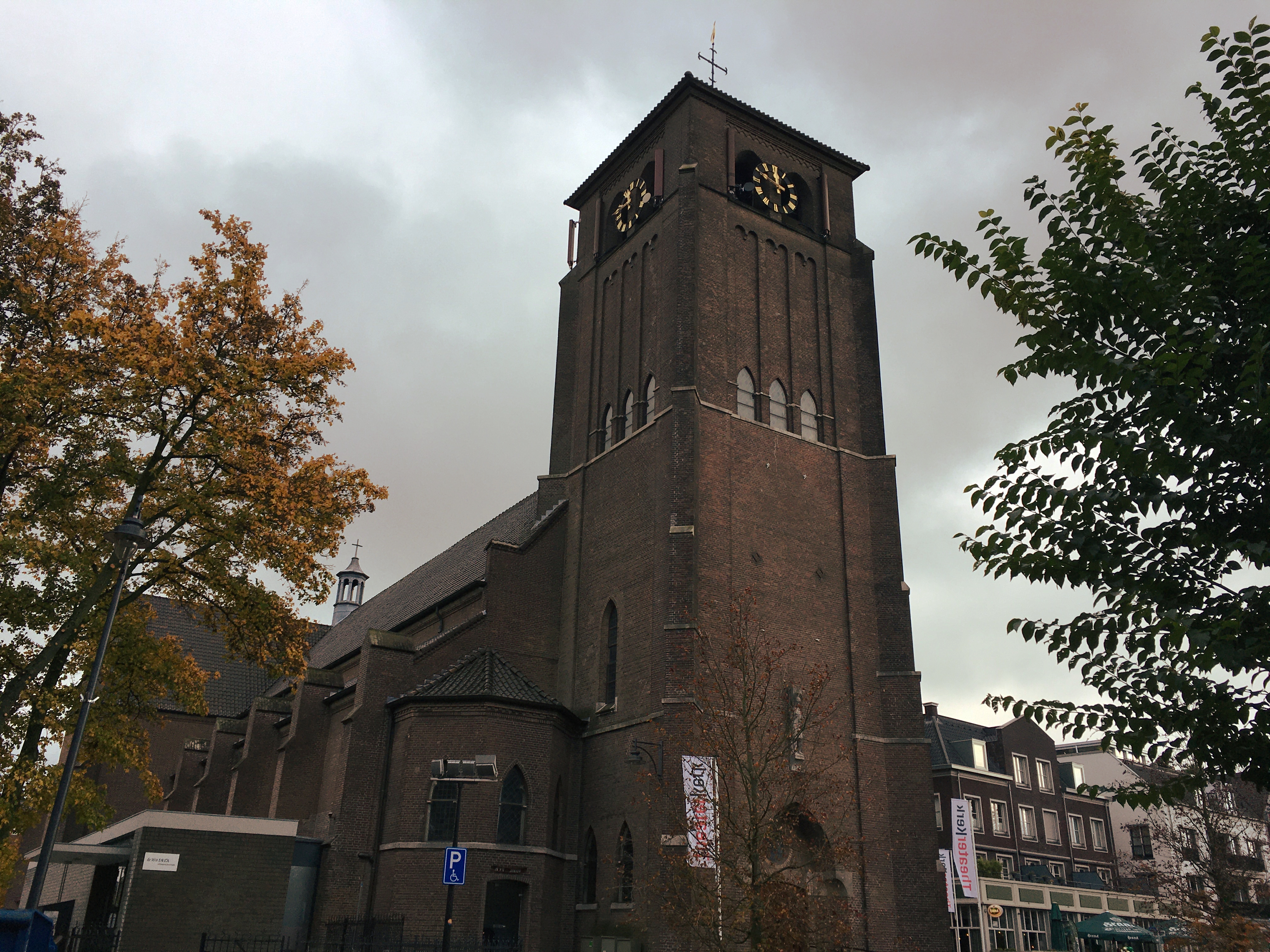
- Side view of the building
- Bemmel Theaterchurch
- 51°53′34″N 5°53′51″E
- Location: Bemmel, Lingewaard
- Website: Theaterkerk.nl

Architecture
- Architect(s): H.J. Wennekers & J. Sluijmer
- Style: Gothic Revival

The Bemmel Theaterchurch (Dutch: Theaterkerk Bemmel) is a theater and former Catholic church building in Bemmel, Netherlands.

== History ==
The church building was built in the period 1872–1873; it was dedicated to Saint Donatus of Arezzo. It was opened in 1873, on August 7: the feast day of Saint Donatus. The building then bore the name 'Holy Donatus Church' (Dutch: Heilige Donatuskerk).

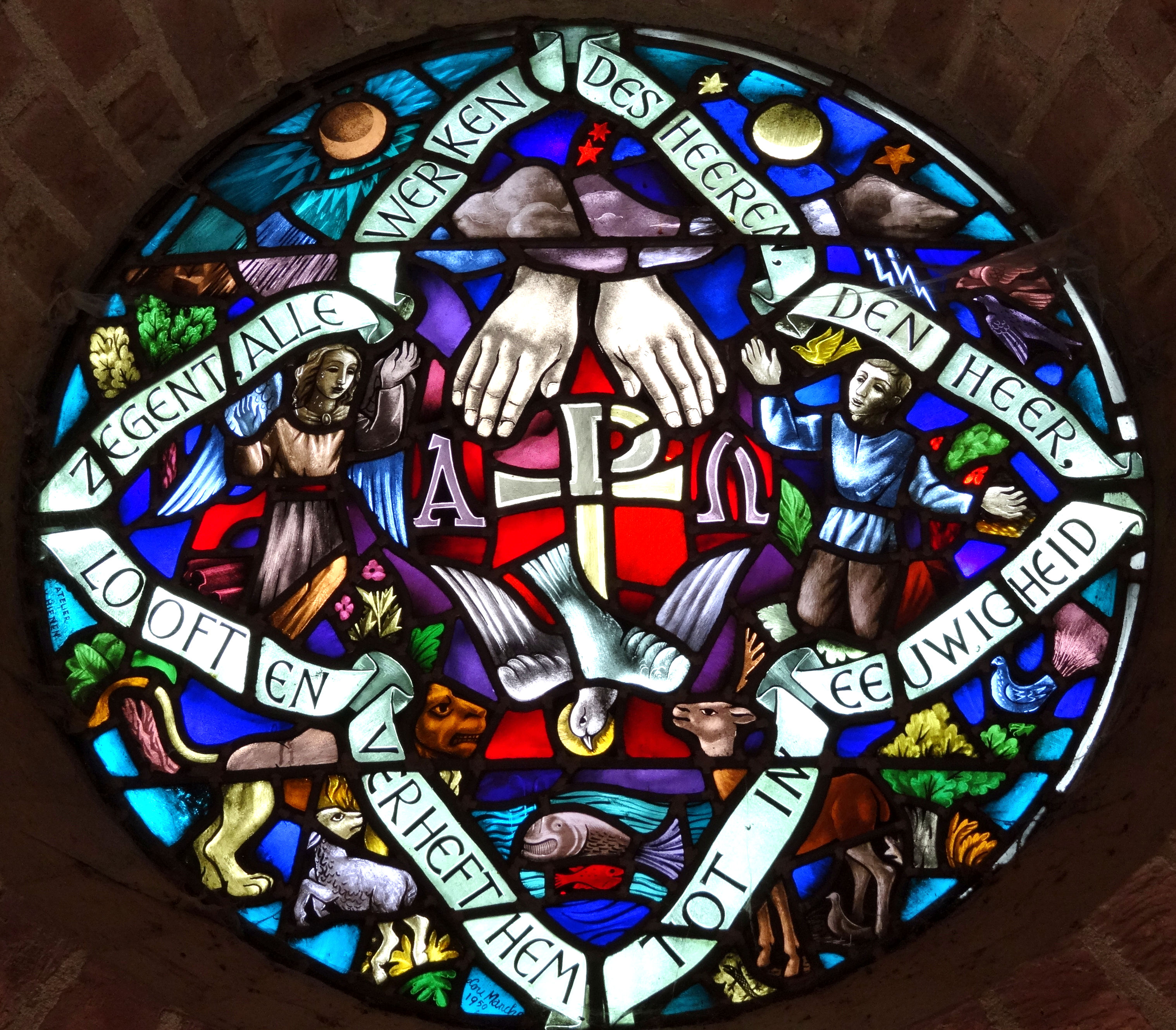
Leadlight church window by Lou Manche (1950)

From 2015 to 2016, the church was converted into a multifunctional building with a theater hall, an entrance hall with a bar, and a few smaller rooms. The building was renamed 'Bemmel Theaterchurch' (Dutch: Theaterkerk Bemmel) and was opened in October 2016.

== Gallery ==
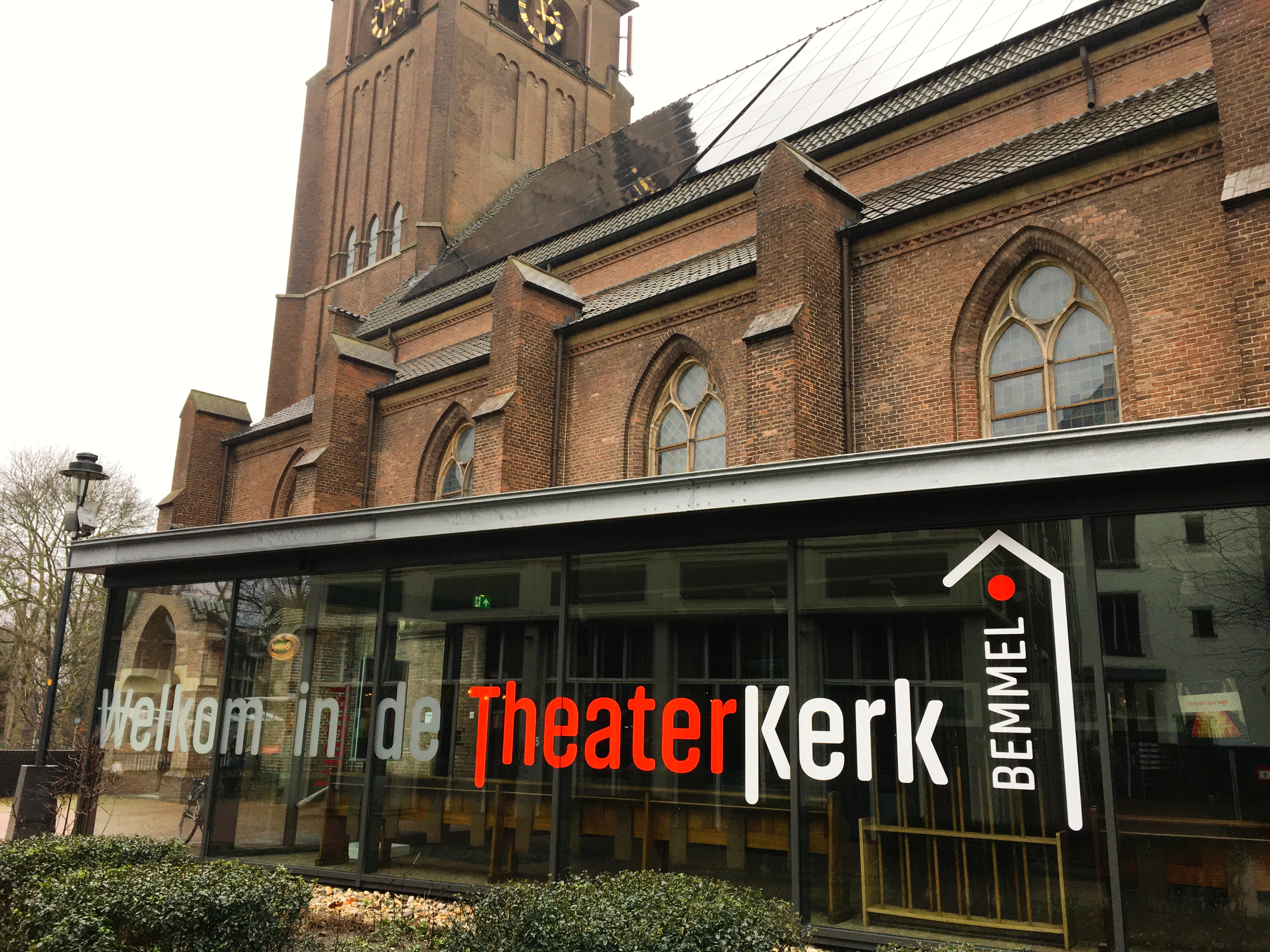
Entrance of the theater (east wing)

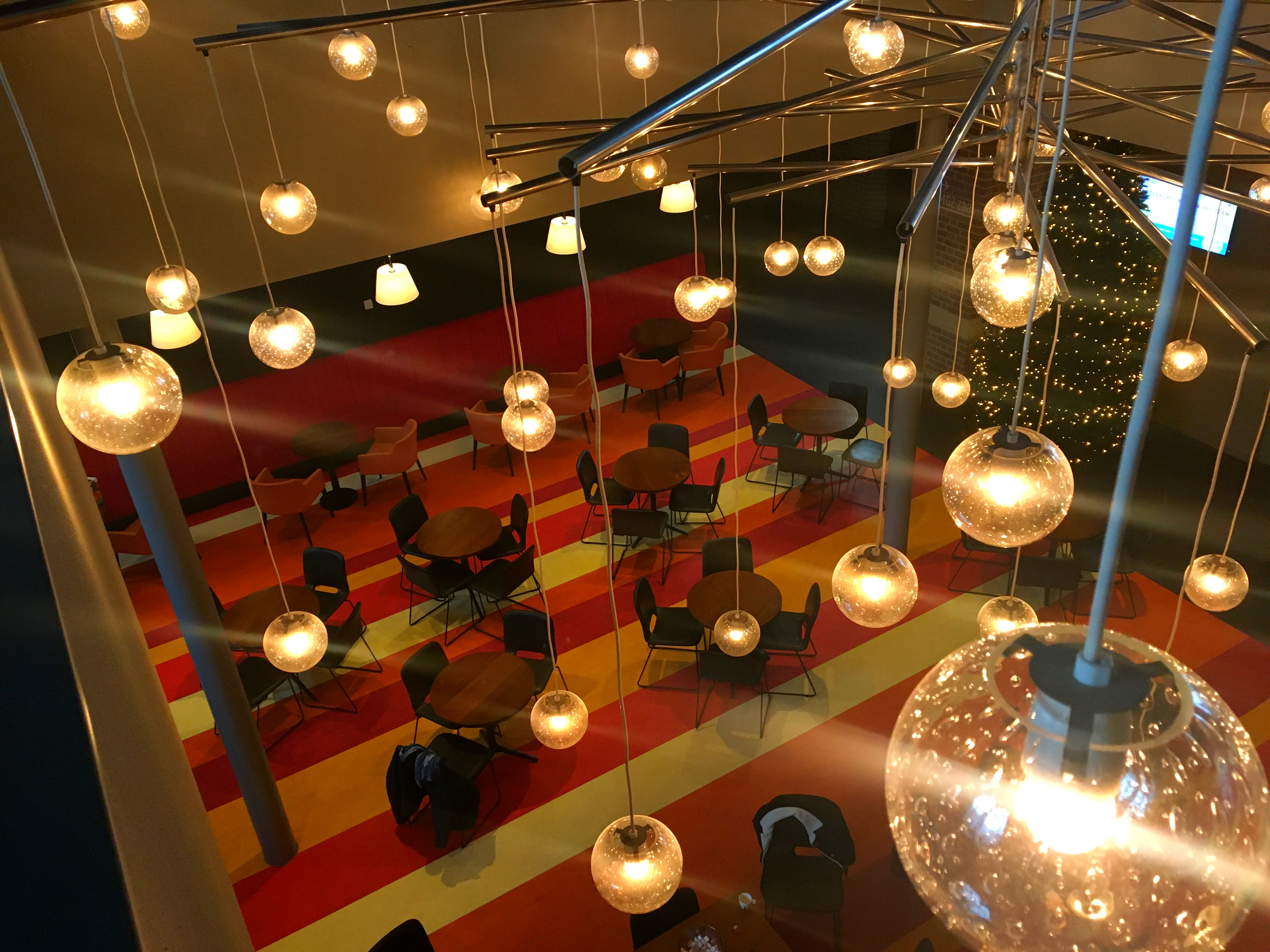
The entrance hall

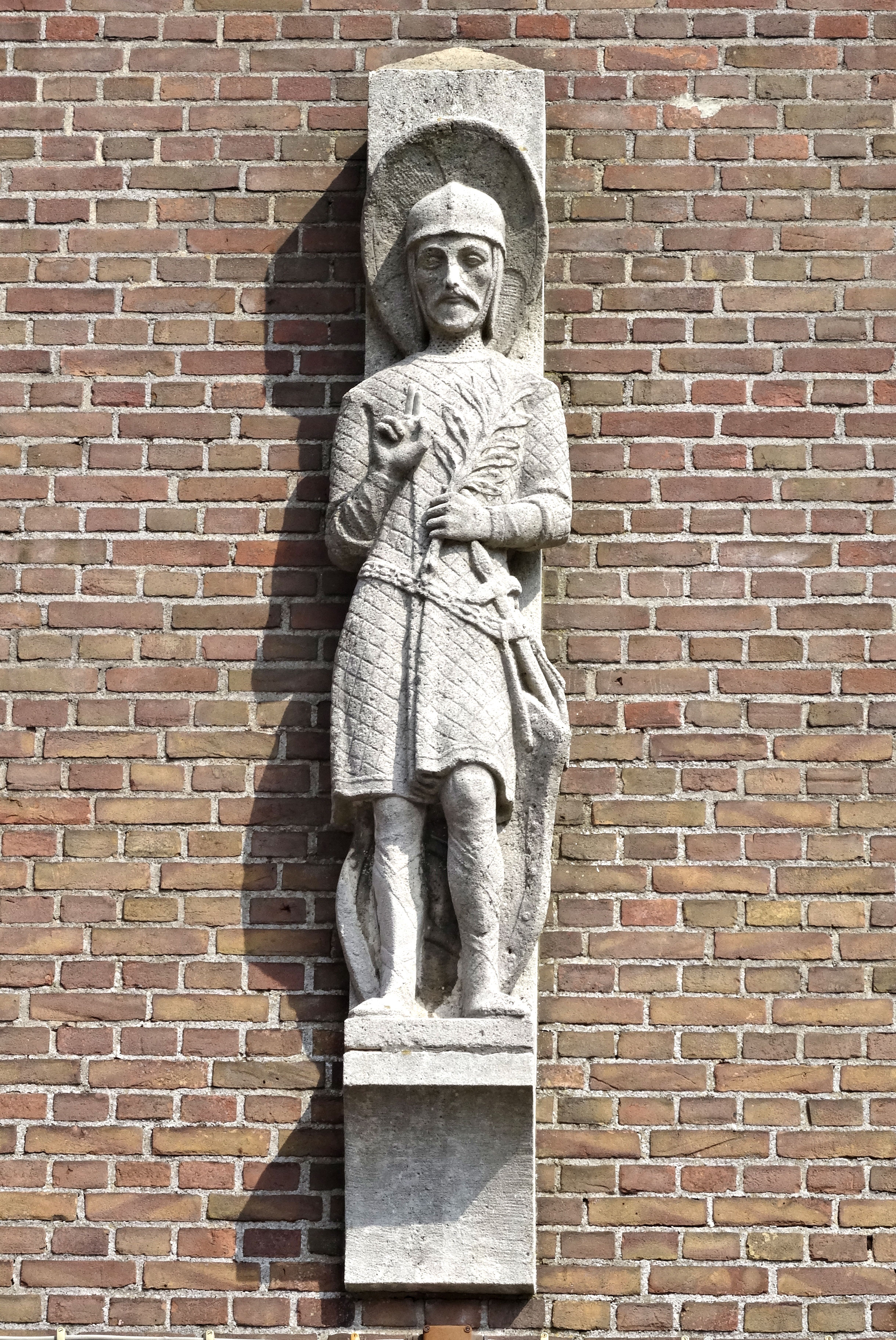
Facade statue of Saint Donatus of Arezzo

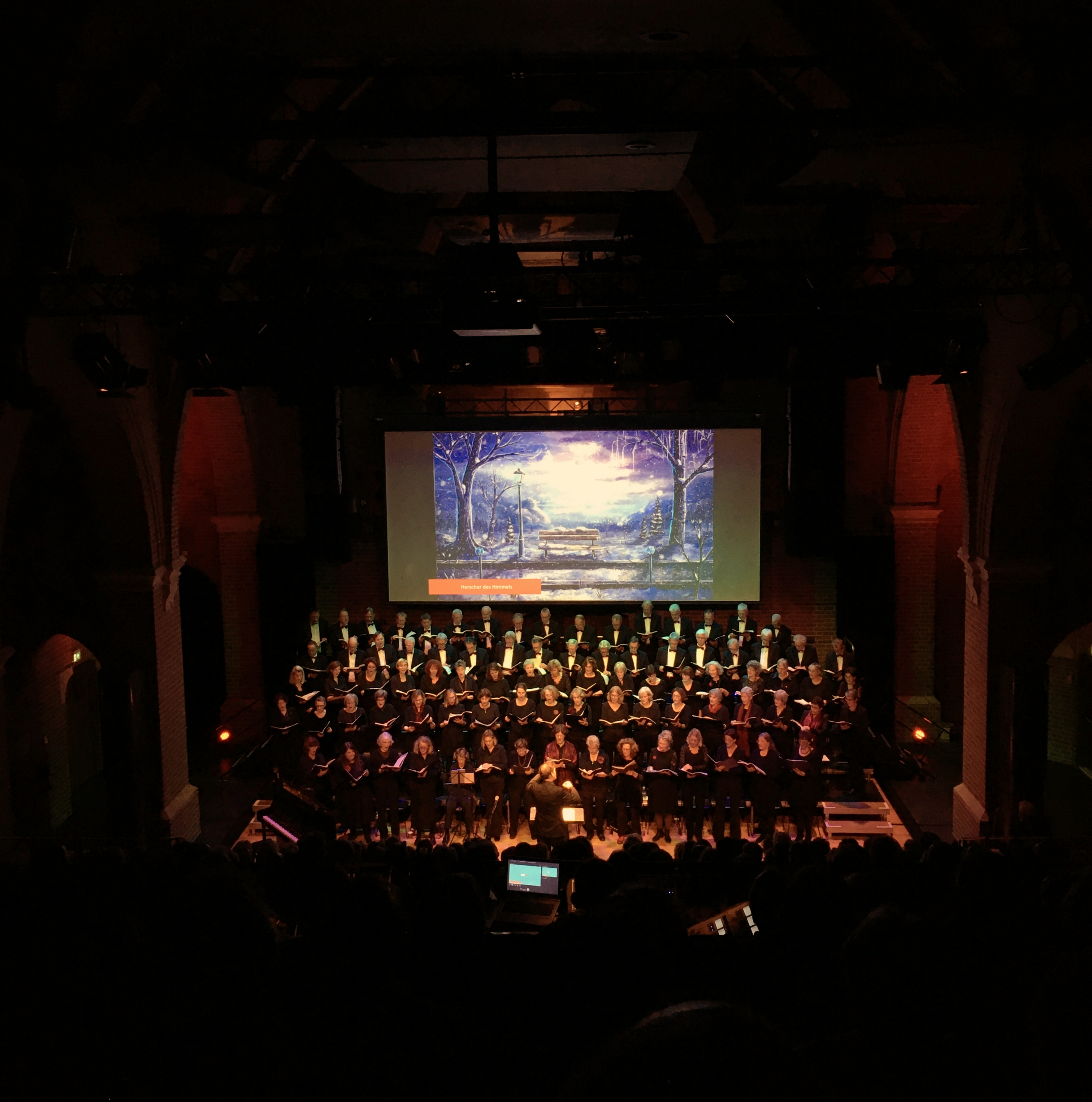
Concert of the Bach Choir of Nijmegen (2019)

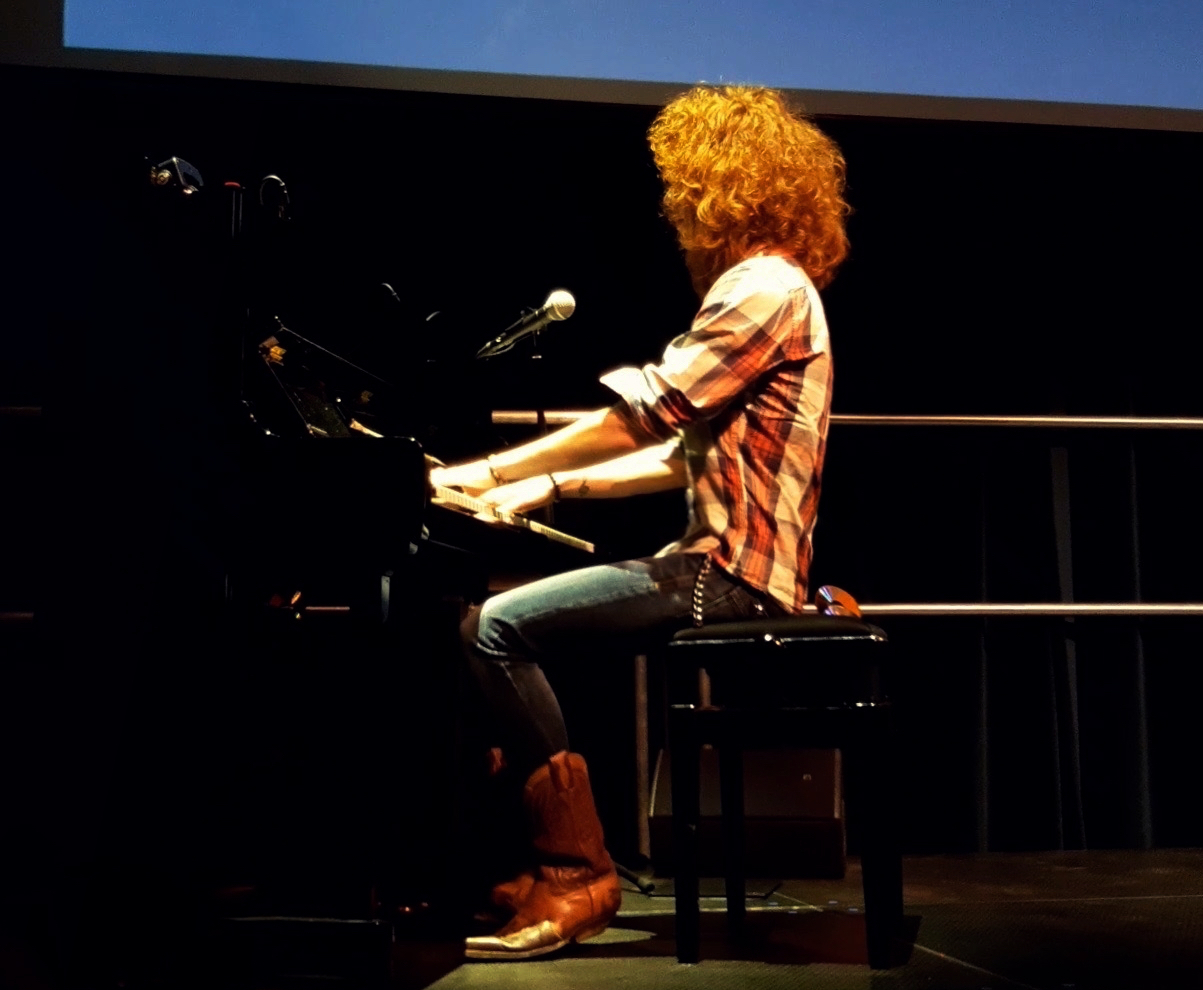
Performance of Dutch rock artist Nuva Macare (2020)

== See also ==
- Kinkelenburg Castle
- Fort Pannerden
