= List of cities, towns and villages in Gelderland =

This is a list of cities, towns and villages in the province of Gelderland, in the Netherlands.

Name	Municipality	Coordinates
Aalst	Buren	51°57′N 5°33′E
Aalst	Zaltbommel	51°47′N 5°08′E
Aalten	Aalten	51°56′N 6°35′E
Aam	Overbetuwe	51°55′N 5°52′E
Achter de Vree	Oldebroek	52°26′N 5°57′E
Achterdrempt	Bronckhorst	52°01′N 6°11′E
Achterhoek	Nijkerk	52°13′N 5°25′E
Achterstehoek	Duiven	51°57′N 6°01′E
Acquoy	Geldermalsen	51°53′N 5°08′E
Aerdt	Zevenaar	51°54′N 6°05′E
Afferden	Druten	51°53′N 5°38′E
Alem	Maasdriel	51°47′N 5°21′E
Almen	Lochem	52°09′N 6°18′E
Alphen	West Maas en Waal	51°49′N 5°28′E
Altforst	West Maas en Waal	51°51′N 5°34′E
Alverna	Wijchen	51°48′N 5°46′E
Ammerzoden	Maasdriel	51°45′N 5°13′E
Ampsen	Lochem	52°10′N 6°26′E
Andelst	Overbetuwe	51°54′N 5°44′E
Angeren	Lingewaard	51°55′N 5°58′E
Angerlo	Zevenaar	52°00′N 6°08′E
Apeldoorn	Apeldoorn	52°13′N 5°58′E
Aperloo	Elburg	52°26′N 5°52′E
Appel	Nijkerk	52°11′N 5°33′E
Appeltern	West Maas en Waal	51°50′N 5°35′E
Appen	Voorst	52°11′N 6°08′E
Armhoede	Lochem	52°10′N 6°27′E
Arnhem	Arnhem	51°59′N 5°55′E
Asch	Buren	51°56′N 5°19′E
Asperen	Lingewaal	51°54′N 5°07′E
Assel	Apeldoorn	52°12′N 5°50′E
Assendorp	Heerde	52°24′N 6°04′E
Avest	Berkelland	52°04′N 6°35′E
Azewijn	Montferland	51°53′N 6°18′E
Baak	Bronckhorst	52°05′N 6°14′E
Baal	Lingewaard	51°54′N 5°55′E
Babberich	Zevenaar	51°54′N 6°07′E
Bahr	Zevenaar	51°59′N 6°03′E
Bakermark	Bronckhorst	52°04′N 6°14′E
Bakhuisbos	Oldebroek	52°24′N 6°01′E
Balgoij	Wijchen	51°47′N 5°43′E
Barchem	Lochem	52°08′N 6°27′E
Barlo	Aalten	51°58′N 6°36′E
Barneveld	Barneveld	52°08′N 5°35′E
Batenburg	Wijchen	51°49′N 5°38′E
Bato's Erf	Maasdriel	51°50′N 5°24′E
Bato's Erf	Putten	52°13′N 5°39′E
Beek	Berg en Dal	51°50′N 5°56′E
Beek	Montferland	51°54′N 6°11′E
Beekbergen	Apeldoorn	52°09′N 5°58′E
Beemte	Apeldoorn	52°15′N 6°00′E
Beesd	Geldermalsen	51°53′N 5°12′E
Bekveld	Bronckhorst	52°03′N 6°18′E
Beltrum	Berkelland	52°04′N 6°34′E
Bemmel	Lingewaard	51°54′N 5°54′E
Benedeneind	Lingewaal	51°50′N 5°30′E
Beneden-Leeuwen	West Maas en Waal	51°53′N 5°31′E
Bennekom	Ede	52°00′N 5°41′E
Bergakker	Tiel	51°53′N 5°23′E
Berg en Dal	Berg en Dal	51°49′N 5°55′E
Bergerden	Lingewaard	51°55′N 5°55′E
Bergharen	Wijchen	51°51′N 5°40′E
Berghuizen	West Maas en Waal	51°49′N 5°31′E
Berghuizen	Heerde	52°27′N 6°05′E
Berm	Maasdriel	51°47′N 5°19′E
Bern	Zaltbommel	51°45′N 5°10′E
Beuningen	Beuningen	51°52′N 5°47′E
Beusichem	Buren	51°57′N 5°18′E
Bevermeer	Zevenaar	52°00′N 6°10′E
Bijsteren	Putten	52°16′N 5°35′E
Bingerden	Zevenaar	51°59′N 6°06′E
Binnenheurne	Oude IJsselstreek	51°56′N 6°27′E
Blankenberg	Heumen	51°47′N 5°50′E
Blauwesluis	West Maas en Waal	51°50′N 5°33′E
Blekkink	Aalten	51°55′N 6°40′E
Boerenhoek	Lingewaard	51°54′N 5°58′E
Bontebrug	Oude IJsselstreek	51°54′N 6°24′E
Bontemorgen	Buren	51°58′N 5°31′E
Borculo	Berkelland	52°07′N 6°31′E
Boschheurne	Lochem	52°07′N 6°28′E
Boskant	Wijchen	51°47′N 5°46′E
Boshoek	Epe	52°20′N 6°02′E
Boveneind	Lingewaal	51°49′N 5°31′E
Boven-Leeuwen	West Maas en Waal	51°53′N 5°33′E
Bovenstreek	Oldebroek	52°26′N 5°54′E
Bovenveen	Oldebroek	52°26′N 5°54′E
Braamt	Montferland	51°55′N 6°16′E
Brakel	Zaltbommel	51°49′N 5°06′E
Bredelaar	Overbetuwe	51°55′N 5°53′E
Bredevoort	Aalten	51°57′N 6°37′E
Breedeweg	Berg en Dal	51°46′N 5°57′E
Breedenbroek	Oude IJsselstreek	51°53′N 6°28′E
Brinke	Winterswijk	51°57′N 6°41′E
Brinkheurne	Winterswijk	51°57′N 6°44′E
Brinkmanshoek	Berkelland	52°05′N 6°30′E
Broekdijk	Oldebroek	52°27′N 5°56′E
Broeke	Berkelland	52°09′N 6°30′E
Broekkant	Nijmegen	51°48′N 5°50′E
Broekland	Apeldoorn	52°16′N 6°01′E
Bronkhorst	Bronckhorst	52°05′N 6°11′E
Bronsbergen	Zutphen	52°07′N 6°12′E
Brouwershoek	Berkelland	52°06′N 6°28′E
Bruchem	Zaltbommel	51°47′N 5°14′E
Bruil	Berkelland	52°04′N 6°27′E
Brummen	Brummen	52°06′N 6°10′E
Bullenkamp	Wijchen	51°47′N 5°47′E
Buren	Buren	51°55′N 5°20′E
Bussloo	Voorst	52°12′N 6°08′E
Buurmalsen	Geldermalsen	51°54′N 5°18′E
Californië	Maasdriel	51°55′N 5°14′E
Coldenhove	Brummen	52°06′N 6°03′E
Colonjes	Berg en Dal	51°46′N 5°56′E
Corle	Winterswijk	51°58′N 6°40′E
Cortenoever	Brummen	52°06′N 6°12′E
Covik	Bronckhorst	52°04′N 6°12′E
Crob	Neerijnen	51°49′N 5°12′E
Culemborg	Culemborg	51°57′N 5°14′E
Dale	Aalten	51°57′N 6°34′E
De Beek, Apeldoorn	Apeldoorn	52°15′N 5°45′E
De Bosjes	Buren	51°57′N 5°17′E
De Delle	Oldebroek	52°24′N 6°00′E
De Dennenhoek	Berkelland	52°10′N 6°34′E
De Droo	Duiven	51°57′N 6°01′E
Deelen	Ede	52°04′N 5°54′E
De Emmer	Bronckhorst	52°04′N 6°10′E
Deest	Druten	51°53′N 5°40′E
De Ginkel	Ede	52°02′N 5°44′E
De Glind	Barneveld	52°07′N 5°30′E
De Haar	Berkelland	52°04′N 6°26′E
De Heurne	Berkelland	51°53′N 6°30′E
De Heuvel	Buren	51°57′N 5°17′E
De Horst	Berkelland	52°09′N 6°31′E
De Horst	Berg en Dal	51°47′N 5°58′E
Deil	Geldermalsen	51°53′N 5°15′E
De Kade	Ede	52°01′N 5°36′E
De Kar	Voorst	52°12′N 6°03′E
De Klomp	Ede	52°03′N 5°35′E
De Kraats	Ede	52°01′N 5°38′E
De Krim	Apeldoorn	52°07′N 5°54′E
De Laar	Arnhem	51°57′N 5°51′E
Delden	Bronckhorst	52°05′N 6°17′E
De Leuke	Bronckhorst	52°06′N 6°20′E
Delwijnen	Zaltbommel	51°46′N 5°11′E
De Mars	Buren	51°57′N 5°32′E
De Meene	Bronckhorst	52°01′N 6°23′E
Den Akker	Neder-Betuwe	51°54′N 5°28′E
Den Eng	Buren	51°57′N 5°30′E
Den Hoef	Wijchen	51°50′N 5°38′E
De Pas	Lingewaard	51°54′N 6°01′E
De Pas	Arnhem	51°58′N 5°52′E
De Peppeld	Wageningen	51°58′N 5°40′E
De Rietschoof	Zaltbommel	51°46′N 5°08′E
De Schatkuil	Heumen	51°47′N 5°48′E
De Schoolt	Lochem	52°13′N 6°21′E
De Schutterij	Oost Gelre	51°59′N 6°32′E
De Steeg	Rheden	52°01′N 6°03′E
De Tuut	West Maas en Waal	51°50′N 5°36′E
De Valk (township)	Ede	52°08′N 5°41′E
De Vecht	Voorst	52°16′N 6°02′E
De Veenhuis	Nijkerk	52°13′N 5°26′E
De Voorwaarts	Apeldoorn	52°13′N 6°01′E
De Wijk	Voorst	52°13′N 6°07′E
De Woerd	Buren	51°54′N 5°23′E
De Wopereis	Oost Gelre	52°00′N 6°30′E
De Zoom	Nunspeet	52°23′N 5°49′E
Dichteren	Doetinchem	51°57′N 6°16′E
Didam	Montferland	51°56′N 6°08′E
Dieren	Rheden	52°03′N 6°08′E
Diermen	Putten	52°15′N 5°30′E
Dijkhoek	Berkelland	52°06′N 6°31′E
Dijkhuizen	Epe	52°21′N 6°01′E
Dinxperlo	Aalten	51°52′N 6°29′E
Dodewaard	Neder-Betuwe	51°55′N 5°39′E
Doesburg	Doesburg	52°01′N 6°08′E
Doesburg	Ede	52°04′N 5°37′E
Doesburgerbuurt	Ede	52°03′N 5°39′E
Doetinchem	Doetinchem	51°58′N 6°18′E
Doornenburg	Lingewaard	51°53′N 6°00′E
Doornik	Lingewaard	51°53′N 5°53′E
Doorning	Maasdriel	51°48′N 5°20′E
Doornspijk	Elburg	52°25′N 5°49′E
Doornsteeg	Nijkerk	52°14′N 5°28′E
Doorwerth	Renkum	51°59′N 5°48′E
Drempt	Bronckhorst	52°00′N 6°10′E
Dreumel	West Maas en Waal	51°51′N 5°26′E
Drie	Ermelo	52°16′N 5°41′E
Driedorp	Nijkerk	52°12′N 5°31′E
Drieënhuizen	Barneveld	52°09′N 5°42′E
Driel	Overbetuwe	51°58′N 5°49′E
Driesprong	Ede	52°04′N 5°42′E
Droge	Heumen	51°47′N 5°51′E
Druten	Druten	51°53′N 5°37′E
Duinen	Harderwijk	52°21′N 5°41′E
Duistervoorde	Voorst	52°14′N 6°06′E
Duiven	Duiven	51°57′N 6°01′E
Duivendans	Oldebroek	52°28′N 5°59′E
Dunsborg	Bronckhorst	52°02′N 6°19′E
Echteld	Neder-Betuwe	51°55′N 5°30′E
Eck en Wiel	Buren	51°58′N 5°27′E
Ede	Ede	52°02′N 5°40′E
Ederveen	Ede	52°04′N 5°35′E
Eefde	Lochem	52°10′N 6°14′E
Eefsele	Oost Gelre	52°02′N 6°36′E
Eekt	Oldebroek	52°27′N 5°53′E
Eerbeek	Brummen	52°06′N 6°04′E
Eibergen	Berkelland	52°06′N 6°39′E
Eimeren	Overbetuwe	51°54′N 5°49′E
Elburg	Elburg	52°27′N 5°50′E
Elden	Arnhem	51°58′N 5°53′E
Eldik	Neder-Betuwe	51°55′N 5°36′E
Eldrik	Bronckhorst	51°59′N 6°11′E
Ellecom	Rheden	52°02′N 6°06′E
Elspeet	Nunspeet	52°18′N 5°47′E
Elst	Overbetuwe	51°55′N 5°51′E
Empe	Voorst	52°09′N 6°09′E
Emst	Epe	52°19′N 5°59′E
Eng	Duiven	51°57′N 6°01′E
Engbergen	Oude IJsselstreek	51°53′N 6°24′E
Engeland	Apeldoorn	52°10′N 5°57′E
Engeland	Oldebroek	52°27′N 5°58′E
Enspijk	Geldermalsen	51°53′N 5°13′E
Epe	Epe	52°21′N 5°59′E
Epse	Lochem	52°13′N 6°12′E
Erichem	Buren	51°54′N 5°21′E
Erlecom	Berg en Dal	51°51′N 5°58′E
Ermelo	Ermelo	52°18′N 5°37′E
Eschoten	Ede	52°07′N 5°45′E
Essebroek	Buren	51°58′N 5°29′E
Essen	Barneveld	52°10′N 5°41′E
Est	Neerijnen	51°51′N 5°19′E
Esveld	Barneveld	52°08′N 5°36′E
Etten	Oude IJsselstreek	51°55′N 6°20′E
Everwenninkhoek	Bronckhorst	52°06′N 6°25′E
Ewijk	Heumen	51°46′N 5°46′E
Ewijk	Beuningen	51°52′N 5°44′E
Exel	Lochem	52°11′N 6°25′E
Exel-Tol	Lochem	52°11′N 6°23′E
Flieren	Lingewaard	51°54′N 5°58′E
Friezenwijk	Lingewaal	51°52′N 5°04′E
Frankrijk	Harderwijk	52°21′N 5°39′E
Gaanderen	Oude IJsselstreek	51°56′N 6°21′E
Gameren	Zaltbommel	51°48′N 5°12′E
Ganzert	Buren	51°58′N 5°28′E
Garderbroek	Barneveld	52°10′N 5°40′E
Garderen	Barneveld	52°14′N 5°43′E
Geenweide	Maasdriel	51°47′N 5°17′E
Geerstraat	Epe	52°18′N 6°01′E
Geesteren	Berkelland	52°08′N 6°32′E
Geitenwaard	Zevenaar	51°53′N 6°05′E
Geldermalsen	Geldermalsen	51°53′N 5°18′E
Gellicum	Geldermalsen	51°53′N 5°09′E
Gelselaar	Berkelland	52°10′N 6°32′E
Gendringen	Oude IJsselstreek	51°52′N 6°23′E
Gendt	Lingewaard	51°53′N 5°58′E
Gerven	Putten	52°13′N 5°36′E
Giesbeek	Zevenaar	52°00′N 6°04′E
Gietelo	Voorst	52°11′N 6°08′E
Glinden	Barneveld	52°07′N 5°33′E
Goilberdingen	Culemborg	51°57′N 5°11′E
Gooi	Bronckhorst	52°02′N 6°16′E
Gorssel	Lochem	52°12′N 6°12′E
Gortel	Epe	52°19′N 5°54′E
Grafwegen	Berg en Dal	51°45′N 5°57′E
Greffeling	West Maas en Waal	51°50′N 5°29′E
Greffelkamp	Montferland	51°57′N 6°07′E
Grieth	Zevenaar	51°55′N 6°07′E
Groenendaal	Apeldoorn	52°05′N 5°57′E
Groenlanden	Berg en Dal	51°52′N 5°55′E
Groenlo	Oost Gelre	52°03′N 6°37′E
Groesbeek	Berg en Dal	51°47′N 5°56′E
Groessen	Duiven	51°56′N 6°02′E
Groot Breedenbroek	Oude IJsselstreek	51°54′N 6°27′E
Groot Deunk	Oost Gelre	51°58′N 6°36′E
Groot Dochteren	Lochem	52°10′N 6°22′E
Groot Entink	Oude IJsselstreek	51°56′N 6°30′E
Grote Kolonie	Nunspeet	52°18′N 5°46′E
Haaften	Neerijnen	51°49′N 5°13′E
Haalderen	Lingewaard	51°53′N 5°56′E
Haarlo	Berkelland	52°07′N 6°35′E
Haart	Aalten	51°55′N 6°38′E
Hall	Brummen	52°07′N 6°06′E
Halle	Bronckhorst	51°59′N 6°26′E
Halle-Heide	Bronckhorst	52°01′N 6°27′E
Halle-Nijman	Bronckhorst	51°59′N 6°25′E
Halvinkhuizen	Putten	52°15′N 5°36′E
Harderwijk	Harderwijk	52°21′N 5°38′E
Harfsen	Lochem	52°12′N 6°18′E
Harreveld	Oost Gelre	51°59′N 6°31′E
Harselaar	Barneveld	52°10′N 5°34′E
Harskamp	Ede	52°08′N 5°45′E
Hattelaar	Neerijnen	51°51′N 5°22′E
Hattem	Hattem	52°28′N 6°04′E
Hattemerbroek	Oldebroek	52°28′N 6°02′E
Hedel	Maasdriel	51°45′N 5°16′E
Heegh	Montferland	51°56′N 6°09′E
Heelsum	Renkum	51°59′N 5°45′E
Heelweg	Oude IJsselstreek	51°58′N 6°28′E
Heerde	Heerde	52°23′N 6°03′E
's Heerenberg	Montferland	51°53′N 6°15′E
Heerewaarden	Maasdriel	51°49′N 5°24′E
Hees	Nijmegen	51°50′N 5°50′E
Heesselt	Neerijnen	51°49′N 5°21′E
Hegge	Epe	52°18′N 5°58′E
Heide	Heumen	51°47′N 5°49′E
Heide	Montferland	51°56′N 6°10′E
Heidekant	Doetinchem	51°57′N 6°12′E
Heidenhoek	Bronckhorst	51°59′N 6°21′E
Heikant	Berg en Dal	51°47′N 5°57′E
Heilig Landstichting	Berg en Dal	51°49′N 5°54′E
Heiveld	Wijchen	51°48′N 5°47′E
Helhoek	Duiven	51°56′N 6°02′E
Hell	Putten	52°14′N 5°32′E
Hellouw	Neerijnen	51°50′N 5°11′E
Hemmen	Overbetuwe	51°56′N 5°42′E
Hengelo	Bronckhorst	52°03′N 6°19′E
Hengstdal	Nijmegen	51°50′N 5°53′E
Henxel	Winterswijk	51°59′N 6°45′E
Heppert	West Maas en Waal	51°51′N 5°35′E
Hernen	Wijchen	51°50′N 5°41′E
Herveld	Overbetuwe	51°54′N 5°45′E
Herwen	Zevenaar	51°53′N 6°06′E
Herwijnen	Lingewaal	51°49′N 5°08′E
Het Beggelder	Aalten	51°52′N 6°28′E
Het Broek	Doetinchem	51°57′N 6°15′E
Heteren	Overbetuwe	51°58′N 5°45′E
Het Hoog	Lingewaard	51°54′N 5°54′E
Het Vels	Aalten	51°54′N 6°34′E
Heukelum	Lingewaal	51°53′N 5°04′E
Heumen	Heumen	51°46′N 5°51′E
Heure	Berkelland	52°07′N 6°30′E
Heurne	Aalten	51°54′N 6°34′E
Heurne	Bronckhorst	52°02′N 6°27′E
Heuven	Doetinchem	51°56′N 6°19′E
Heveadorp	Renkum	51°58′N 5°49′E
Hien	Neder-Betuwe	51°55′N 5°40′E
Hierden	Harderwijk	52°21′N 5°40′E
Hoef	Putten	52°15′N 5°34′E
Hoek	Beuningen	51°53′N 5°42′E
Hoekelum	Ede	52°01′N 5°40′E
Hoenderloo	Apeldoorn	52°07′N 5°53′E
Hoenzadriel	Maasdriel	51°45′N 5°20′E
Hoeve	Beuningen	51°52′N 5°44′E
Hoevelaken	Nijkerk	52°10′N 5°28′E
Hoge Enk	Elburg	52°26′N 5°51′E
Holk	Nijkerk	52°13′N 5°27′E
Holkerveen	Nijkerk	52°12′N 5°27′E
Hollenberg	Aalten	51°57′N 6°36′E
Holterhoek	Berkelland	52°05′N 6°40′E
Holthuizen	Zevenaar	51°55′N 6°06′E
Holthuizen	Montferland	51°57′N 6°10′E
Homoet	Overbetuwe	51°56′N 5°48′E
Honderdmorgen	Lingewaard	51°54′N 6°00′E
Hoog-Baarlo	Apeldoorn	52°07′N 5°53′E
Hoogbroek	Neder-Betuwe	51°55′N 5°30′E
Hoog-Buurlo	Apeldoorn	52°11′N 5°51′E
Hooge Bijssel	Nunspeet	52°23′N 5°44′E
Hoogeind	Westervoort	51°57′N 5°58′E
Hoog Kana	Buren	51°58′N 5°30′E
Hoog-Keppel	Bronckhorst	52°00′N 6°12′E
Hoogmeien	Buren	51°56′N 5°30′E
Hoog-Soeren	Apeldoorn	52°13′N 5°53′E
Hooilanden	Apeldoorn	52°10′N 6°02′E
Hoonte	Berkelland	52°07′N 6°37′E
Hoophuizen	Nunspeet	52°23′N 5°43′E
Hoorn	Heerde	52°24′N 6°04′E
Hoornerveen	Heerde	52°24′N 6°02′E
Hoorzik	Maasdriel	51°47′N 5°19′E
Horssen	West Maas en Waal	51°51′N 5°37′E
Horst	Ermelo	52°18′N 5°35′E
Horsthoek	Epe	52°22′N 6°02′E
Horsthoekerveld	Epe	52°23′N 6°01′E
Houtdorp	Ermelo	52°15′N 5°43′E
Huinen	Putten	52°14′N 5°36′E
Huinerbroek	Putten	52°14′N 5°35′E
Huinerwal	Putten	52°14′N 5°36′E
Huissen	Lingewaard	51°56′N 5°56′E
Hulhuizen	Lingewaard	51°53′N 6°00′E
Hulshorst	Nunspeet	52°22′N 5°44′E
Hummelo	Bronckhorst	52°00′N 6°14′E
Huppel	Winterswijk	52°00′N 6°45′E
Hupsel	Berkelland	52°05′N 6°37′E
Hurwenen	Maasdriel	51°49′N 5°19′E
IJsselhunten	Oude IJsselstreek	51°53′N 6°19′E
IJzendoorn	Neder-Betuwe	51°54′N 5°32′E
IJzerlo	Aalten	51°53′N 6°32′E
IJzevoorde	Doetinchem	51°58′N 6°22′E
Imbosch	Rozendaal	52°04′N 5°59′E
Indoornik	Overbetuwe	51°57′N 5°43′E
Ingen	Buren	51°58′N 5°29′E
Jonas	Epe	52°17′N 6°00′E
Joppe	Lochem	52°12′N 6°14′E
Kallenbroek	Barneveld	52°09′N 5°32′E
Kamp	Berg en Dal	51°47′N 5°56′E
Kampernieuwstad	Oldebroek	52°31′N 5°53′E
Kapel	Lingewaard	51°53′N 5°58′E
Kapel-Avezaath	Tiel	51°53′N 5°23′E
Katgershoek	Lochem	52°11′N 6°21′E
Keijenborg	Bronckhorst	52°02′N 6°18′E
Kekerdom	Berg en Dal	51°52′N 6°00′E
Kerk-Avezaath	Buren	51°54′N 5°23′E
Kerkdorp	Oldebroek	52°29′N 5°54′E
Kerkdriel	Maasdriel	51°46′N 5°20′E
Kerkwijk	Zaltbommel	51°47′N 5°13′E
Kesteren	Neder-Betuwe	51°56′N 5°34′E
Keulse Kamp	Overbetuwe	51°57′N 5°49′E
Kievitsdel	Renkum	51°59′N 5°47′E
Kilder	Montferland	51°56′N 6°14′E
Klaarwater	Nijkerk	52°10′N 5°29′E
Klarenbeek	Apeldoorn	52°10′N 6°05′E
Klarenbeek	Voorst	52°10′N 6°05′E
Klein Amsterdam	Voorst	52°09′N 6°06′E
Klein-Azewijn	Montferland	51°54′N 6°18′E
Klein Baal	Lingewaard	51°54′N 5°55′E
Klein Dochteren	Lochem	52°09′N 6°22′E
Kleindorp	Doetinchem	51°58′N 6°12′E
Kleine Kolonie	Nunspeet	52°17′N 5°46′E
Klein Heidekamp	Arnhem	52°02′N 5°54′E
Klinkenberg	Buren	51°58′N 5°30′E
Kluis	Berg en Dal	51°48′N 5°51′E
Kolthoorn	Heerde	52°24′N 6°02′E
Kommerdijk	Lingewaard	51°52′N 5°57′E
Kootwijk	Barneveld	52°11′N 5°46′E
Kootwijkerbroek	Barneveld	52°09′N 5°40′E
Kotten	Winterswijk	51°56′N 6°46′E
Koudenhoek	Nijmegen	51°52′N 5°51′E
Koudhoorn	Putten	52°14′N 5°40′E
Krachtighuizen	Putten	52°14′N 5°37′E
Kranenburg	Bronckhorst	52°06′N 6°22′E
Kreel	Ede	52°03′N 5°43′E
Kring van Dorth	Lochem	52°13′N 6°16′E
Kruisberg	Doetinchem	51°59′N 6°18′E
Kruishaar	Nijkerk	52°12′N 5°33′E
Kulsdom	Lochem	52°09′N 6°29′E
Kwartier	Montferland	51°55′N 6°09′E
Laageinde	Geldermalsen	51°52′N 5°16′E
Laag-Keppel	Bronckhorst	52°00′N 6°13′E
Laag-Soeren	Rheden	52°05′N 6°04′E
Laak	Wijchen	51°50′N 5°37′E
Laarstraat	Epe	52°20′N 5°59′E
Lage Bijssel	Nunspeet	52°24′N 5°47′E
Lagewald	Berg en Dal	51°48′N 5°58′E
Lakemond	Overbetuwe	51°57′N 5°39′E
Lammers	Winterswijk	51°55′N 6°44′E
Langelaar	Barneveld	52°06′N 5°31′E
Langen	Lochem	52°09′N 6°27′E
Langerak	Doetinchem	51°59′N 6°15′E
Lapstreek	Oldebroek	52°27′N 5°57′E
Laren	Lochem	52°12′N 6°22′E
Larense Broek	Lochem	52°13′N 6°22′E
Lathum	Zevenaar	51°59′N 6°01′E
Lede en Oudewaard	Neder-Betuwe	51°57′N 5°33′E
Leesten	Zutphen	52°08′N 6°14′E
Leeuwen	Wageningen	51°58′N 5°41′E
Lemperhoek	Berkelland	52°09′N 6°31′E
Lengel	Montferland	51°53′N 6°16′E
Lent	Nijmegen	51°52′N 5°52′E
Leo-Stichting	Berkelland	52°06′N 6°30′E
Leur	Wijchen	51°49′N 5°42′E
Leutes	Buren	51°56′N 5°33′E
Leuth	Berg en Dal	51°50′N 5°59′E
Leuven	Lingewaal	51°51′N 5°06′E
Leuvenheim	Brummen	52°05′N 6°08′E
Leuvenum	Ermelo	52°18′N 5°43′E
Lichtenberg	Oude IJsselstreek	51°54′N 6°24′E
Lichtenvoorde	Oost Gelre	51°59′N 6°34′E
Lienden	Wijchen	51°49′N 5°40′E
Lienden	Buren	51°57′N 5°31′E
Lieren	Apeldoorn	52°10′N 6°00′E
Lievelde	Oost Gelre	52°01′N 6°36′E
Lijnden	Overbetuwe	51°55′N 5°49′E
Linde	Bronckhorst	52°05′N 6°21′E
Lintelo	Aalten	51°56′N 6°31′E
Lintvelde	Berkelland	52°05′N 6°33′E
Lobith	Zevenaar	51°52′N 6°07′E
Lochem	Lochem	52°10′N 6°25′E
Lochuizen	Berkelland	52°09′N 6°37′E
Loenen	Overbetuwe	51°53′N 5°47′E
Loenen	Apeldoorn	52°07′N 6°01′E
Loerbeek	Montferland	51°56′N 6°13′E
Loil	Montferland	51°57′N 6°09′E
Loo	Duiven	51°56′N 5°59′E
Loo	Berkelland	52°07′N 6°41′E
Loobrink	Epe	52°19′N 6°00′E
Looveer	Lingewaard	51°56′N 5°58′E
Luchtenburg	Buren	51°58′N 5°30′E
Lunen	Wijchen	51°47′N 5°45′E
Lunteren	Ede	52°05′N 5°37′E
Lutterveld	Buren	51°54′N 5°22′E
Maasbommel	West Maas en Waal	51°49′N 5°32′E
Malburgen	Arnhem	51°58′N 5°55′E
Malden	Heumen	51°47′N 5°51′E
Mallem	Berkelland	52°07′N 6°40′E
Manen	Ede	52°02′N 5°38′E
Mariënboom	Berg en Dal	51°50′N 5°53′E
Mariënvelde	Oost Gelre	52°01′N 6°28′E
Mariënwaard	Geldermalsen	51°53′N 5°13′E
Markluiden	Epe	52°22′N 6°03′E
Mark	Geldermalsen	51°51′N 5°17′E
Maurik	Buren	51°58′N 5°25′E
Meddo	Winterswijk	52°01′N 6°42′E
Medel	Tiel	51°54′N 5°29′E
Meerenbroek	Doetinchem	51°58′N 6°14′E
Meerten	Buren	51°57′N 5°31′E
Meertenwei	Buren	51°56′N 5°31′E
Meerveld	Apeldoorn	52°14′N 5°46′E
Meerwijk	Berg en Dal	51°49′N 5°55′E
Megchelen	Oude IJsselstreek	51°50′N 6°24′E
Merm	Overbetuwe	51°55′N 5°52′E
Meteren	Geldermalsen	51°52′N 5°17′E
Meulunteren	Ede	52°06′N 5°40′E
Millingen aan de Rijn	Berg en Dal	51°52′N 6°03′E
Milt	Oude IJsselstreek	51°53′N 6°21′E
Miste	Winterswijk	51°57′N 6°39′E
Molecaten	Hattem	52°28′N 6°03′E
Moleneind	West Maas en Waal	51°49′N 5°28′E
Molenhoek	Heumen	51°46′N 5°46′E
Moordhuizen	West Maas en Waal	51°49′N 5°26′E
Moorst	Barneveld	52°06′N 5°29′E
Moorst	Scherpenzeel	52°06′N 5°29′E
Mossel	Bronckhorst	52°07′N 6°23′E
Mullegen	Oldebroek	52°26′N 5°56′E
Mun	West Maas en Waal	51°50′N 5°34′E
Nederasselt	Heumen	51°46′N 5°45′E
Nederbiel	Berkelland	52°08′N 6°33′E
Nederhemert	Zaltbommel	51°46′N 5°10′E
Nederwoud	Ede	52°06′N 5°35′E
Neede	Berkelland	52°08′N 6°37′E
Neerbosch	Nijmegen	51°50′N 5°49′E
Neerbosch West	Nijmegen	51°50′N 5°48′E
Neerijnen	Neerijnen	51°50′N 5°17′E
Neersteind	Druten	51°51′N 5°36′E
Neijenkamp	Bronckhorst	51°59′N 6°24′E
Nekkeveld	Nijkerk	52°15′N 5°24′E
Nergena	Ede	52°00′N 5°39′E
Nettelhorst	Lochem	52°10′N 6°29′E
Netterden	Oude IJsselstreek	51°51′N 6°19′E
Niersen	Epe	52°17′N 5°54′E
Nieuwaal	Zaltbommel	51°48′N 5°11′E
Nieuw-Dijk	Montferland	51°56′N 6°09′E
Nieuwenhuishoek	Berkelland	52°05′N 6°29′E
Nieuwe Schans	West Maas en Waal	51°50′N 5°30′E
Nieuwgraaf	Duiven	51°59′N 6°00′E
Nieuw-Milligen	Apeldoorn	52°13′N 5°47′E
Nieuw Oostendorp	Oude IJsselstreek	51°55′N 6°26′E
Nieuw-Reemst	Ede	52°03′N 5°46′E
Nieuwstad	Elburg	52°27′N 5°50′E
Nieuw-Wehl	Doetinchem	51°58′N 6°10′E
Niftrik	Wijchen	51°48′N 5°40′E
Nijbroek	Voorst	52°18′N 6°04′E
Nijkerk	Nijkerk	52°13′N 5°29′E
Nijkerkerveen	Nijkerk	52°12′N 5°28′E
Nijmegen	Nijmegen	51°50′N 5°52′E
Noordeinde	Oldebroek	52°31′N 5°53′E
Noord-Empe	Voorst	52°10′N 6°07′E
Noordijk	Berkelland	52°09′N 6°34′E
Noordijkerveld	Berkelland	52°08′N 6°36′E
Noordink	Bronckhorst	52°04′N 6°19′E
Norden	Putten	52°16′N 5°35′E
Nude	Wageningen	51°58′N 5°38′E
Nunspeet	Nunspeet	52°23′N 5°48′E
Ochten	Neder-Betuwe	51°54′N 5°34′E
Oeken	Brummen	52°07′N 6°09′E
Oene	Epe	52°21′N 6°03′E
Oenerdijk	Epe	52°21′N 6°03′E
Oensel	Zaltbommel	51°48′N 5°17′E
Olburgen	Bronckhorst	52°03′N 6°08′E
Oldebroek	Oldebroek	52°27′N 5°54′E
Olden Eibergen	Berkelland	52°06′N 6°37′E
Oldhorst	Oldebroek	52°28′N 5°58′E
Ommeren	Buren	51°57′N 5°30′E
Ommerenveld	Buren	51°56′N 5°29′E
Ooij	Berg en Dal	51°52′N 5°56′E
Ooij	Neder-Betuwe	51°54′N 5°30′E
Ooij	Zevenaar	51°55′N 6°04′E
Oolde	Lochem	52°13′N 6°21′E
Oosseld	Doetinchem	51°57′N 6°19′E
Oostendorp	Elburg	52°27′N 5°52′E
Oosterbeek	Renkum	51°59′N 5°51′E
Oosterhof	Epe	52°17′N 5°59′E
Oosterhout	Nijmegen	51°53′N 5°50′E
Oosterhout	Overbetuwe	51°53′N 5°50′E
Oosterhuizen	Apeldoorn	52°09′N 6°00′E
Ooster Oene	Epe	52°21′N 6°03′E
Oosterwijk	Bronckhorst	52°01′N 6°20′E
Oosterwolde	Oldebroek	52°27′N 5°54′E
Ooyerhoek	Zutphen	52°08′N 6°14′E
Ophemert	Neerijnen	51°51′N 5°23′E
Opheusden	Neder-Betuwe	51°56′N 5°38′E
Opijnen	Neerijnen	51°50′N 5°18′E
Ossenwaard	Zevenaar	51°53′N 6°06′E
Otterlo	Ede	52°06′N 5°47′E
Oud-Dijk	Montferland	51°56′N 6°08′E
Oude Maasdijk	West Maas en Waal	51°50′N 5°26′E
Oud-Milligen	Barneveld	52°13′N 5°43′E
Oud-Reemst	Ede	52°03′N 5°49′E
Oud-Zevenaar	Zevenaar	51°55′N 6°05′E
Ouwendorp	Barneveld	52°14′N 5°44′E
Overasselt	Heumen	51°46′N 5°47′E
Overbiel	Berkelland	52°07′N 6°33′E
Overwoud	Barneveld	52°07′N 5°38′E
Palestina	Nijkerk	52°13′N 5°26′E
Pals	Westervoort	51°57′N 5°58′E
Pannerden	Zevenaar	51°53′N 6°03′E
Passerot	Wijchen	51°49′N 5°43′E
Passewaaij	Tiel	51°52′N 5°25′E
Persingen	Berg en Dal	51°50′28″N 5°55′4″E
Plak	Berg en Dal	51°46′N 5°59′E
Plantage	Doetinchem	51°57′N 6°13′E
Poederoijen	Zaltbommel	51°47′N 5°05′E
Poederoijenschehoek	Zaltbommel	51°47′N 5°04′E
Pol	Oude IJsselstreek	51°56′N 6°20′E
Posterenk	Voorst	52°13′N 6°07′E
Posthoorn	Oldebroek	52°29′N 5°56′E
Praets	Arnhem	51°57′N 5°53′E
Priesterink	Bronckhorst	51°59′N 6°22′E
Prinsenkamp	Nijkerk	52°12′N 5°37′E
Puiflijk	Druten	51°53′N 5°35′E
Putten	Putten	52°16′N 5°37′E
Quatre Bras	Lochem	52°11′N 6°13′E
Raayen	Overbetuwe	51°56′N 5°50′E
Radio Kootwijk	Apeldoorn	52°11′N 5°50′E
Rafelder	Oude IJsselstreek	51°54′N 6°20′E
Randwijk	Overbetuwe	51°57′N 5°43′E
Ratum	Winterswijk	51°59′N 6°49′E
Ravenswaaij	Buren	51°57′N 5°20′E
Redichem	Culemborg	51°58′N 5°17′E
Reeth	Overbetuwe	51°54′N 5°50′E
Rekken	Berkelland	52°06′N 6°43′E
Renkum	Renkum	51°58′N 5°44′E
Renselaar	Nijkerk	52°13′N 5°33′E
Respelhoek	Berkelland	52°08′N 6°31′E
Ressen	Lingewaard	51°54′N 5°52′E
Ressen	Nijmegen	51°54′N 5°52′E
Rha	Bronckhorst	52°03′N 6°09′E
Rheden	Rheden	52°00′N 6°01′E
Rhenoy	Geldermalsen	51°53′N 5°09′E
Rhienderen	Brummen	52°06′N 6°09′E
Rietmolen	Berkelland	52°09′N 6°40′E
Rijkerswoerd	Arnhem	51°56′N 5°53′E
Rijswijk	Buren	51°58′N 5°21′E
Roekel	Ede	52°06′N 5°44′E
Rome	Maasdriel	51°48′N 5°19′E
Rossum	Maasdriel	51°48′N 5°20′E
Rozendaal	Rozendaal	52°01′N 5°58′E
Rumpt	Geldermalsen	51°53′N 5°11′E
Ruurlo	Berkelland	52°05′N 6°27′E
Ruurlosche Broek	Berkelland	52°03′N 6°29′E
Schaarsbergen	Arnhem	52°02′N 5°52′E
Schans	Westervoort	51°57′N 5°58′E
Schaveren	Epe	52°19′N 5°57′E
Scherpenzeel	Scherpenzeel	52°05′N 5°29′E
Schoonenburg	Heumen	51°46′N 5°47′E
's-Heerenberg	Montferland	51°53′N 6°15′E
Silvolde	Oude IJsselstreek	51°55′N 6°23′E
Silvolderbuurt	Oude IJsselstreek	51°55′N 6°24′E
Sinderen	Oude IJsselstreek	51°54′N 6°28′E
Sint Andries	Maasdriel	51°48′N 5°22′E
Sleeburg	Heumen	51°46′N 5°48′E
Slichtenhorst	Nijkerk	52°12′N 5°30′E
Slijk-Ewijk	Overbetuwe	51°53′N 5°48′E
Slijkwell	Maasdriel	51°45′N 5°11′E
Snelleveld	Neerijnen	51°51′N 5°17′E
Snodenhoek	Overbetuwe	51°56′N 5°50′E
Spankeren	Rheden	52°03′N 6°07′E
Spekhoek	Voorst	52°15′N 6°08′E
Speuld	Ermelo	52°16′N 5°43′E
Spijk	West Betuwe	51°51′N 5°00′E
Spijk	Zevenaar	51°51′N 6°09′E
Spronk	Oldebroek	52°27′N 5°56′E
Staverden	Ermelo	52°17′N 5°44′E
Steenderen	Bronckhorst	52°04′N 6°11′E
Steenenkamer	Voorst	52°15′N 6°09′E
Steenenkamer	Putten	52°16′N 5°33′E
Sterrenschans	Lingewaard	51°54′N 6°01′E
Stokkum	Montferland	51°53′N 6°13′E
Stroe	Barneveld	52°11′N 5°43′E
Teersdijk	Wijchen	51°49′N 5°46′E
Telgt	Ermelo	52°18′N 5°35′E
Terborg	Oude IJsselstreek	51°55′N 6°21′E
Terlet	Rozendaal	52°04′N 5°57′E
Terschuur	Barneveld	52°10′N 5°31′E
Terwolde	Voorst	52°17′N 6°06′E
Teuge	Voorst	52°14′N 6°03′E
't Harde	Elburg	52°25′N 5°53′E
Tiel	Tiel	51°53′N 5°26′E
Tiengeboden	Berg en Dal	51°52′N 5°54′E
't Klooster	Aalten	51°58′N 6°38′E
't Laar	Epe	52°18′N 5°57′E
't Loo	Lingewaard	52°27′N 5°58′E
't Oever	Putten	52°17′N 5°33′E
Toldijk	Bronckhorst	52°03′N 6°13′E
Tolkamer	Zevenaar	51°51′N 6°06′E
Tonden	Brummen	52°08′N 6°08′E
Tongeren	Epe	52°21′N 5°56′E
Tonsel	Harderwijk	52°20′N 5°37′E
Tricht	Geldermalsen	51°53′N 5°16′E
Tuil	Neerijnen	51°49′N 5°14′E
Tuindorp	Zevenaar	51°51′N 6°06′E
't Villeken	Aalten	51°57′N 6°34′E
't Vlot	Overbetuwe	51°57′N 5°50′E
Tweesluizen	Buren	51°53′N 5°22′E
Twello	Voorst	52°14′N 6°06′E
't Woud	Nijkerk	52°12′N 5°33′E
't Zand	Lingewaard	51°53′N 5°53′E
't Zand	Oldebroek	52°30′N 6°01′E
Ubbergen	Berg en Dal	51°50′N 5°55′E
Uddel	Apeldoorn	52°16′N 5°47′E
Ugchelen	Apeldoorn	52°11′N 5°56′E
Ulft	Oude IJsselstreek	51°54′N 6°23′E
Vaassen	Epe	52°17′N 5°58′E
Vaassense Broek	Epe	52°17′N 6°00′E
Valburg	Overbetuwe	51°55′N 5°48′E
Valenberg	Heumen	51°47′N 5°47′E
Valentijn	Buren	51°58′N 5°26′E
Varik	Neerijnen	51°49′N 5°22′E
Varssel	Bronckhorst	52°04′N 6°23′E
Varsselder	Oude IJsselstreek	51°53′N 6°21′E
Varsseveld	Oude IJsselstreek	51°57′N 6°28′E
Veenhuizen	Nijkerk	52°13′N 5°26′E
Veenhuizerveld	Putten	52°13′N 5°38′E
Veessen	Heerde	52°23′N 6°05′E
Velddijk	West Maas en Waal	51°50′N 5°32′E
Velddriel	Maasdriel	51°46′N 5°18′E
Veldhoek	Bronckhorst	52°03′N 6°25′E
Veldhoek	Lochem	52°03′N 6°25′E
Veldhunten	Oude IJsselstreek	51°53′N 6°21′E
Veldwijk	Bronckhorst	52°07′N 6°19′E
Velp	Rheden	52°00′N 6°00′E
Velswijk	Bronckhorst	52°01′N 6°18′E
Veluwe	Maasdriel	51°50′N 5°24′E
Vemde	Epe	52°22′N 6°00′E
Verwolde	Lochem	52°13′N 6°25′E
Verwoldse Broek	Lochem	52°13′N 6°23′E
Vethuizen	Montferland	51°55′N 6°18′E
Vierakker	Bronckhorst	52°06′N 6°14′E
Vierhouten	Nunspeet	52°20′N 5°50′E
Vinkwijk	Montferland	51°54′N 6°16′E
Vogelenzang	Heumen	51°46′N 5°50′E
Vogelswerf	Lingewaal	51°51′N 5°03′E
Voordrempt	Bronckhorst	52°00′N 6°10′E
Voorne	Maasdriel	51°49′N 5°25′E
Voorst	Oude IJsselstreek	51°53′N 6°25′E
Voorst	Voorst	52°10′N 6°09′E
Voorstonden	Brummen	52°08′N 6°09′E
Voorthuizen	Barneveld	52°11′N 5°37′E
Vorchten	Heerde	52°24′N 6°07′E
Vorden	Bronckhorst	52°06′N 6°19′E
Voskuil	Oldebroek	52°29′N 6°00′E
Vossen	Barneveld	52°13′N 5°45′E
Vosseneind	Heumen	51°46′N 5°50′E
Vossenpels	Lingewaard	51°53′N 5°53′E
Vragender	Oost Gelre	51°59′N 6°37′E
Vredenburg	Arnhem	51°57′N 5°54′E
Vuren	Lingewaal	51°49′N 5°03′E
Waardenburg	Neerijnen	51°50′N 5°16′E
Wadenoijen	Tiel	51°52′N 5°22′E
Wageningen	Wageningen	51°58′N 5°40′E
Wageningen-Hoog	Wageningen	51°59′N 5°42′E
Walderveen	Barneveld	52°07′N 5°33′E
Wals	Oude IJsselstreek	51°52′N 6°21′E
Wamel	West Maas en Waal	51°53′N 5°28′E
Wapenveld	Heerde	52°26′N 6°04′E
Warken	Zutphen	52°08′N 6°16′E
Warm	Oude IJsselstreek	51°55′N 6°19′E
Warnsveld	Zutphen	52°09′N 6°14′E
Wassinkbrink	Bronckhorst	51°59′N 6°18′E
Waterhoek	Berkelland	52°06′N 6°33′E
Wehl	Doetinchem	51°58′N 6°13′E
Wekerom	Ede	52°07′N 5°43′E
Well	Maasdriel	51°45′N 5°12′E
Wellseind	Maasdriel	51°46′N 5°11′E
Wely	Neder-Betuwe	51°54′N 5°42′E
Wenum	Apeldoorn	52°15′N 5°57′E
Wercheren	Berg en Dal	51°51′N 5°57′E
Werfhorst	Elburg	52°25′N 5°49′E
Wessel	Barneveld	52°09′N 5°38′E
Wessinge	Elburg	52°24′N 5°50′E
Westendorp	Oude IJsselstreek	51°57′N 6°25′E
Westendorp	Epe	52°19′N 5°59′E
Westeneng	Ede	52°08′N 5°43′E
Westervoort	Westervoort	51°58′N 5°58′E
Weurt	Beuningen	51°51′N 5°49′E
Wezel	Wijchen	51°50′N 5°44′E
Wezep	Oldebroek	52°28′N 6°00′E
Wichmond	Bronckhorst	52°05′N 6°15′E
Wieken	Oude IJsselstreek	51°52′N 6°21′E
Wiesel	Apeldoorn	52°16′N 5°56′E
Wijchen	Wijchen	51°49′N 5°44′E
Wijnbergen	Montferland	51°57′N 6°17′E
Wijnbergen	Epe	52°19′N 6°01′E
Wildenbach	Bronckhorst	52°05′N 6°16′E
Wilhelminapark	Brummen	52°06′N 6°04′E
Wilp	Voorst	52°13′N 6°09′E
Wilp-Achterhoek	Voorst	52°13′N 6°05′E
Winkelerhoek	Berkelland	52°04′N 6°27′E
Winkelshoek	Bronckhorst	52°00′N 6°19′E
Winssen	Beuningen	51°53′N 5°43′E
Winterswijk	Winterswijk	51°58′N 6°43′E
Wisch	Oude IJsselstreek	51°56′N 6°19′E
Wissel	Epe	52°21′N 5°58′E
Wissinkhoek	Berkelland	52°04′N 6°28′E
Wittebrink	Bronckhorst	52°00′N 6°17′E
Woerd	West Maas en Waal	51°51′N 5°33′E
Woeste Hoeve	Apeldoorn	52°06′N 5°57′E
Woezik	Wijchen	51°50′N 5°44′E
Wolbert	Heerde	52°25′N 6°05′E
Wolfheze	Renkum	52°00′N 5°47′E
Woold	Winterswijk	51°56′N 6°43′E
Woord	Wijchen	51°48′N 5°44′E
Wordragen	Maasdriel	51°46′N 5°14′E
Worsum	Heumen	51°46′N 5°48′E
Woudhuizen	Apeldoorn	52°13′N 6°03′E
Wullenhoven	Nijkerk	52°13′N 5°31′E
Zaltbommel	Zaltbommel	51°48′N 5°15′E
Zandberg	Buren	51°57′N 5°21′E
Zandheuvel	Lingewaard	51°53′N 5°56′E
Zandvoort	Lingewaard	51°53′N 5°57′E
Zeddam	Montferland	51°54′N 6°16′E
Zeeland	Berg en Dal	51°51′N 6°02′E
Zelhem	Bronckhorst	52°00′N 6°21′E
Zennewijnen	Tiel	51°52′N 5°25′E
Zetten	Overbetuwe	51°56′N 5°43′E
Zeumeren	Barneveld	52°11′N 5°36′E
Zevenaar	Zevenaar	51°56′N 6°04′E
Zevenmorgen	Buren	51°58′N 5°30′E
Ziek	Oude IJsselstreek	51°54′N 6°19′E
Zieuwent	Oost Gelre	52°00′N 6°31′E
Zilven	Brummen	52°06′N 6°02′E
Zoelen	Buren	51°55′N 5°24′E
Zoelmond	Buren	51°56′N 5°19′E
Zuiderrot	Oldebroek	52°27′N 5°53′E
Zuilichem	Zaltbommel	51°49′N 5°08′E
Zutphen	Zutphen	52°08′N 6°12′E
Zuuk	Epe	52°20′N 6°00′E
Zwartebroek	Barneveld	52°11′N 5°31′E
Zwarte Goor	Nunspeet	52°22′N 5°45′E
Zwarte Paard	Buren	51°57′N 5°27′E
Zwarteweg	Oldebroek	52°28′N 5°55′E
Zweekhorst	Zevenaar	51°58′N 6°05′E
Zwiep	Lochem	52°09′N 6°27′E
Zwilbroek	Oost Gelre	52°03′N 6°41′E
Zwolle	Oost Gelre	52°02′N 6°39′E

== Sources ==
- GEOnet Names Server (GNS)
