= Klinkenborg =

Klinkenborg is a surname. Notable people with the surname include:

- Mike Klinkenborg (born 1985), American football player
- Verlyn Klinkenborg (born 1952), American non-fiction author, academic, and newspaper editor

== See also ==
- Klinkenberg (disambiguation)
