= Corble =

Corble is a surname. Notable people with the surname include:

- Archibald Corble (1883–1944), British fencer, great uncle of Simon
- Simon Corble, British playwright, director, and performer

== See also ==
- Corle
