= Klinkenberg =

Klinkenberg may refer to

Villages in the Netherlands

- Klinkenberg (Gelderland)
- Klinkenberg (South Holland)

People

- Dirk Klinkenberg (1709–1799), Dutch astronomer
- Jean-Marie Klinkenberg (born 1944), Belgian linguist and semiotician
- Jeff Klinkenberg, Florida newspaper reporter and author
- Karel Klinkenberg (1852–1924), Dutch painter

Other uses

- Comet C/1743 X1, occasionally referred to as Comet Klinkenberg or Comet Klinkenberg-de Chéseaux
- Asteroid 10427 Klinkenberg (2017 P-L), discovered by Dirk Klinkenberg
- Klinkenberg correction, in petroleum engineering
