= Bontemorgen =

- Hamlet
- Location in the Netherlands Bontemorgen (Netherlands)
- Coordinates: 51°57′47″N 5°31′10″E
- Country: Netherlands
- Province: Gelderland
- Municipality: Buren
- Elevation: 7 m (23 ft)
- Time zone: UTC+1 (CET)
  - Summer (DST): UTC+2 (CEST)
- Postal code: 4033
- Dialing code: 0344

Bontemorgen is a hamlet in the Dutch province of Gelderland. It is a part of the municipality of Buren, and lies about 7 km south of Veenendaal.

Bontemorgen is not a statistical entity, and the postal authorities have placed it under Lienden. It was first mentioned in 1913 as Bontemorgen. Bonte is a references to cows, and morgen is an old land measurement. It consists of about 20 houses.
