= Ommerenveld =

- Hamlet
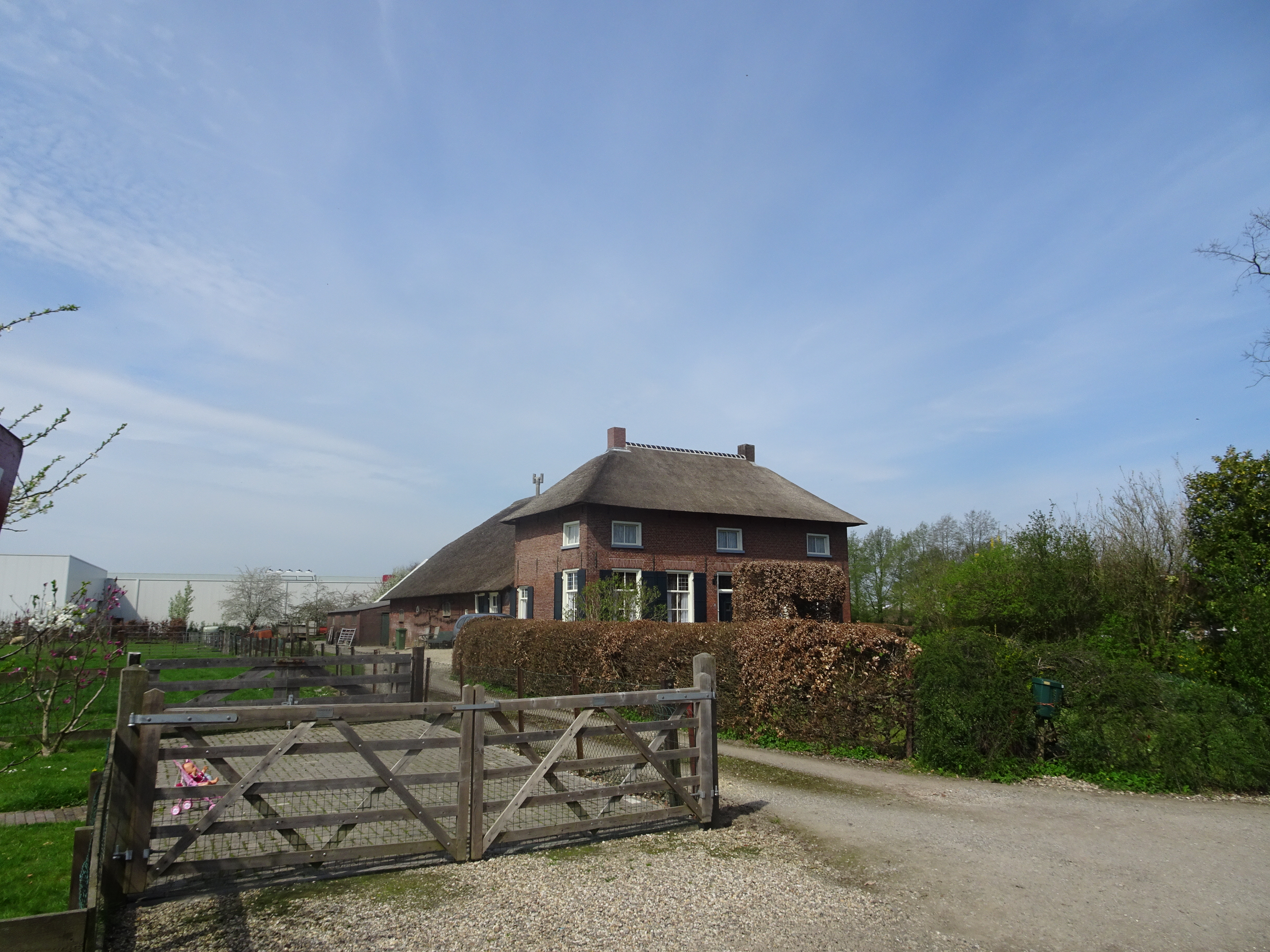
- Farm in Ommerenveld

- Location in the Netherlands Ommerenveld (Netherlands)
- Coordinates: 51°56′05″N 5°29′03″E
- Country: Netherlands
- Province: Gelderland
- Municipality: Buren

Area
  - Total: 9.87 km^{2} (3.81 sq mi)
- Elevation: 7 m (23 ft)

Population (2021)
  - Total: 445
  - Density: 45.1/km^{2} (117/sq mi)
- Time zone: UTC+1 (CET)
  - Summer (DST): UTC+2 (CEST)
- Postal code: 4031 & 4032
- Dialing code: 0344

Ommerenveld is a hamlet in the Dutch province of Gelderland. It is a part of the municipality of Buren, and lies about 6 km northeast of Tiel.

The postal authorities have placed it under Ommeren. Ommerenveld still has a school.
