= Posthoorn =

Coordinates: 52°27′39.34″N 5°2′6.76″E

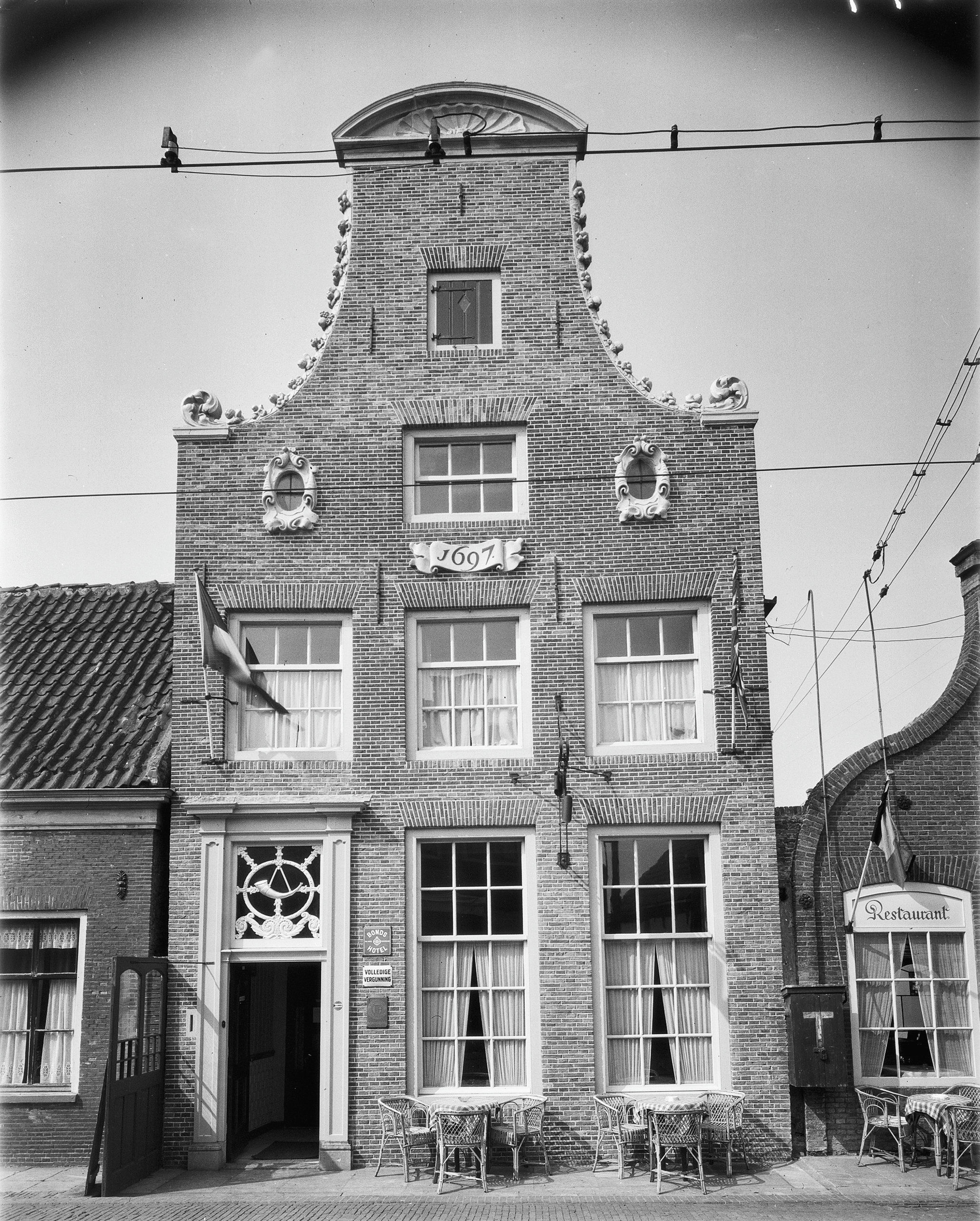
- De Posthoorn as in 1949
- Interactive map of Posthoorn

Restaurant information
- Head chef: Jeroen Bavelaar
- Food type: French, Mediterranean
- Rating: Michelin Guide
- Location: Noordeinde 43, Monnickendam, 1141 AG, Netherlands
- Seating capacity: 50
- Website: Official website

Posthoorn is the restaurant of Suitehotel De Posthoorn in Monnickendam, Netherlands. It is a fine dining restaurant that was awarded one Michelin star in 2009.

In 2011, GaultMillau awarded the restaurant 15 out of 20 points.

As of 2011, the head chef of Posthoorn is Jeroen Bavelaar. He took over from Rogier van Dam, who left the restaurant in 2010.

Hotel De Posthoorn, with its new restaurant, reopened in 2005. The original hotel started as a stable and inn in 1888.

== See also ==
- List of Michelin starred restaurants in the Netherlands
