= De Rietschoof =

- Hamlet
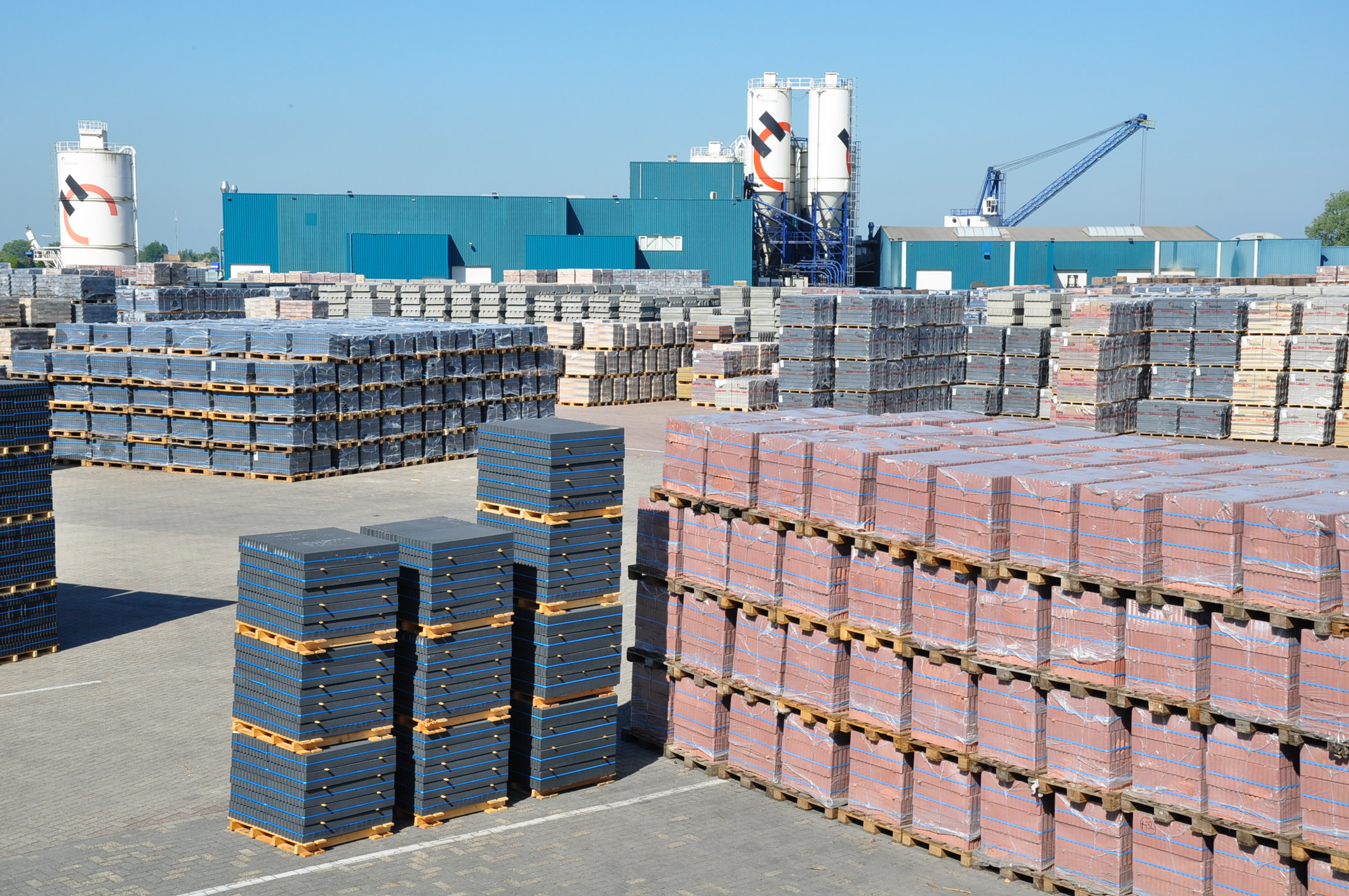
- Brickworks in De Rietschoof

- Location in the Netherlands De Rietschoof (Netherlands)
- Coordinates: 51°46′28″N 5°08′13″E
- Country: Netherlands
- Province: Gelderland
- Municipality: Zaltbommel

Area
  - Total: 0.23 km^{2} (0.089 sq mi)
- Lowest elevation: 4 m (13 ft)

Population (2021)
  - Total: 150
  - Density: 650/km^{2} (1,700/sq mi)
- Time zone: UTC+1 (CET)
  - Summer (DST): UTC+2 (CEST)
- Postal code: 5308
- Dialing code: 0418

De Rietschoof is a hamlet in the Dutch province of Gelderland. It is a part of the municipality of Zaltbommel, and lies about 13 km southeast of Gorinchem.

It was first mentioned in 1847 as Rietschoof, and means bundle of reed (phragmites australis) for thatching. The postal authorities have placed it under Aalst. In 1840, it was home to 100 people. Since 2015, the hamlet has place name signs.
