= Wely =

- Hamlet
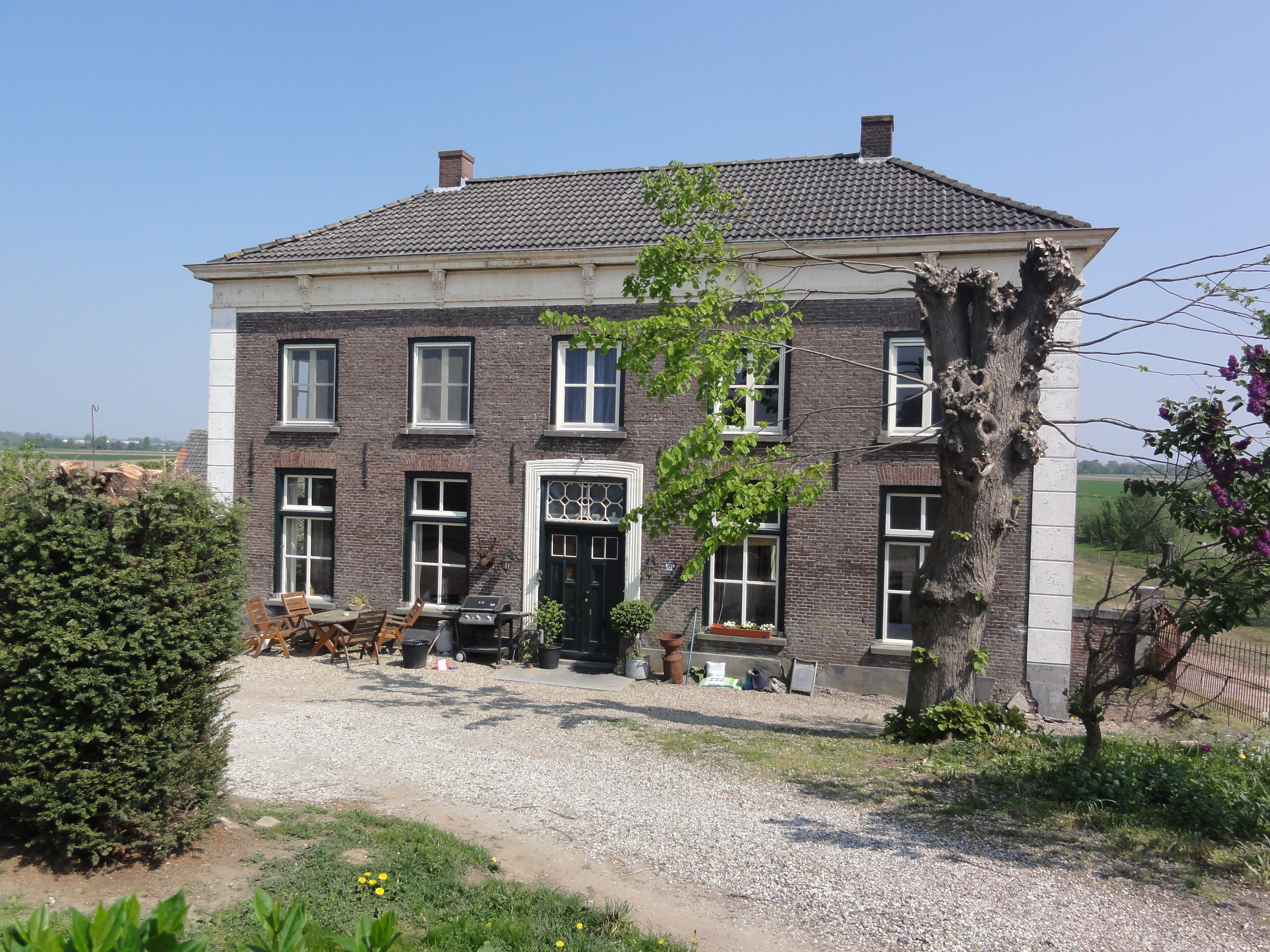
- House in Wely

- Location in the Netherlands Wely (Netherlands)
- Coordinates: 51°54′27″N 5°41′30″E
- Country: Netherlands
- Province: Gelderland
- Municipality: Neder-Betuwe

Area
  - Total: 0.21 km^{2} (0.081 sq mi)
- Elevation: 8 m (26 ft)

Population (2021)
  - Total: 165
  - Density: 790/km^{2} (2,000/sq mi)
- Time zone: UTC+1 (CET)
  - Summer (DST): UTC+2 (CEST)
- Postal code: 6669
- Dialing code: 0488

Wely is a hamlet in the Dutch province of Gelderland. It is a part of the municipality of Neder-Betuwe, and lies about 8 km south of Wageningen.

It was first mentioned in the late 11th century as "apud VUelie". The etymology is unknown. The postal authorities have placed it under Dodewaard.
