= Wageningen-Hoog =

- Township
- Flag
- Interactive map of Wageningen-Hoog
- Coordinates: 51°59′20″N 5°41′35″E
- Country: Netherlands
- Province: Gelderland
- Town: Wageningen

Area
  - Total: 1.57 km^{2} (0.61 sq mi)

Population (2008)
  - Total: 1,180

Wageningen-Hoog is a township in the town of Wageningen in the central Netherlands, in the province of Gelderland.

Wageningen-Hoog is located alongside the Village Bennekom in the town Ede. Wageningen-Hoog is spacious with villa's in a wooded area.
