= Zandberg, Gelderland =

Zandberg
- Hamlet
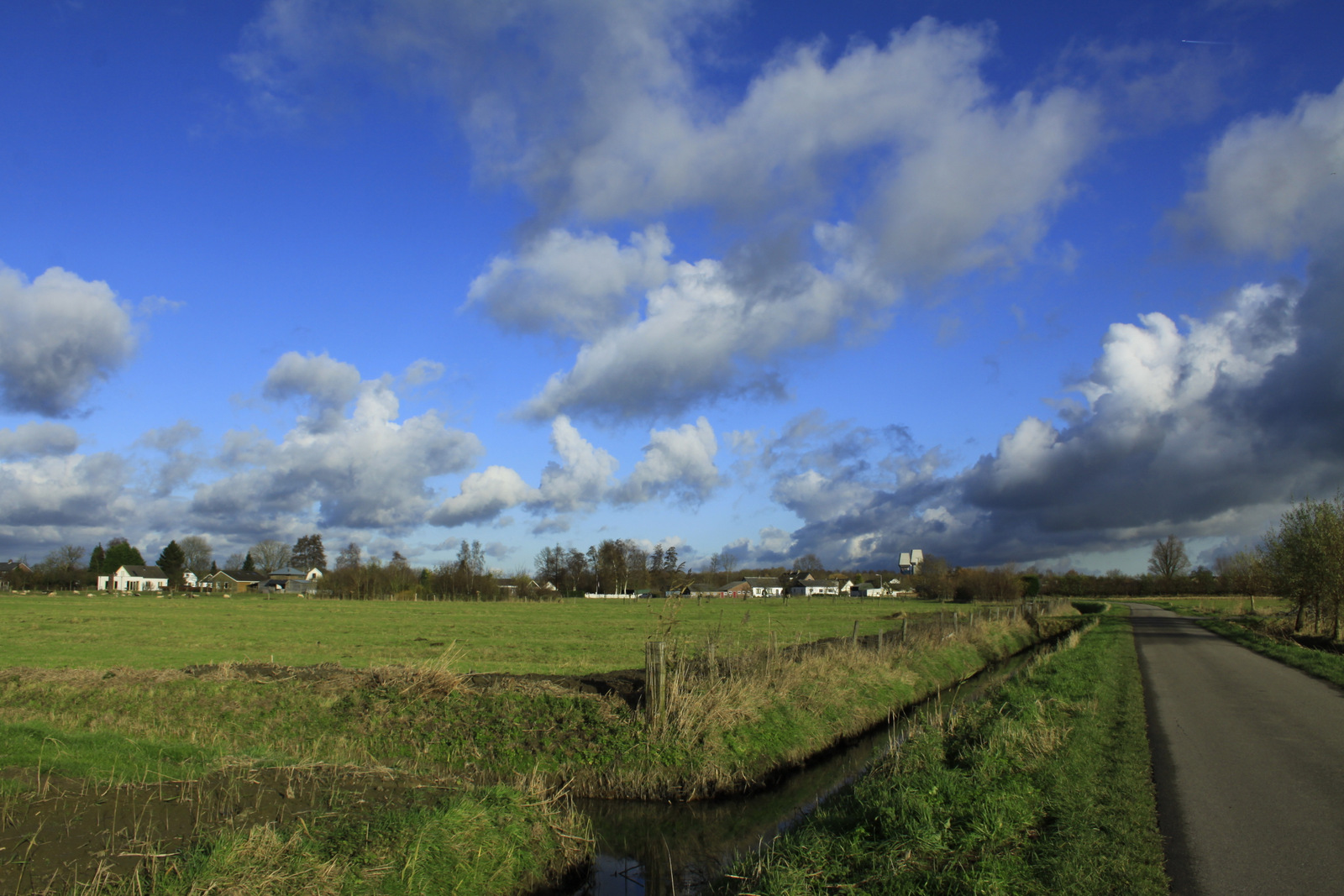
- View on Zandberg

- Location in the Netherlands Zandberg (Netherlands)
- Coordinates: 51°56′56″N 5°20′53″E
- Country: Netherlands
- Province: Gelderland
- Municipality: Buren
- Elevation: 4 m (13 ft)
- Time zone: UTC+1 (CET)
  - Summer (DST): UTC+2 (CEST)
- Postal code: 4023
- Dialing code: 0345

Zandberg is a hamlet in the Dutch province of Gelderland. It is a part of the municipality of Buren, and lies about 9 km northwest of Tiel.

Zandberg is not a statistical entity, and the postal authorities have placed it under Rijswijk. It was first mentioned in 1874 Zandberg and means sand hill. It consists of about 20 houses.
