= Hoog Kana =

- Hamlet
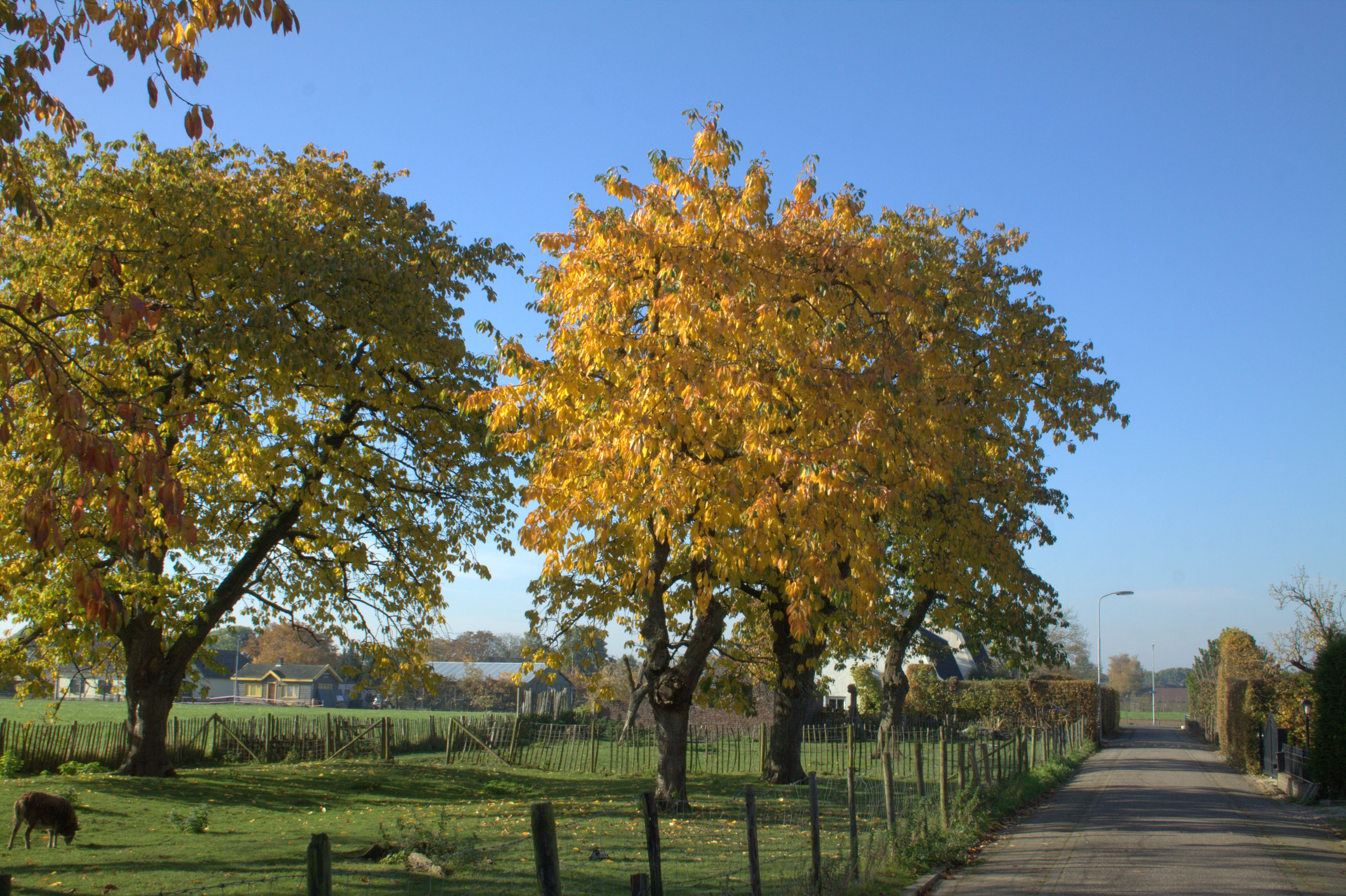
- View on Hoog Kana

- Location in the Netherlands Hoog Kana (Netherlands)
- Coordinates: 51°57′54″N 5°29′44″E
- Country: Netherlands
- Province: Gelderland
- Municipality: Buren
- Elevation: 7 m (23 ft)
- Time zone: UTC+1 (CET)
  - Summer (DST): UTC+2 (CEST)
- Postal code: 4031
- Dialing code: 0344

Hoog Kana is a hamlet in the Dutch province of Gelderland. It is a part of the municipality of Buren, and lies about 7.94 km south of Veenendaal.

It was first mentioned in 1994 as Hoog Kana. Hoog means "high", and Kana is probably a reference to Kafr Kanna where Jesus performed his first miracle. It is not a statistical entity, and the postal authorities have placed it under Ingen. The street name is Hoogkana as one word. The hamlet consists of about 70 houses.
