= Luchtenburg =

- Hamlet
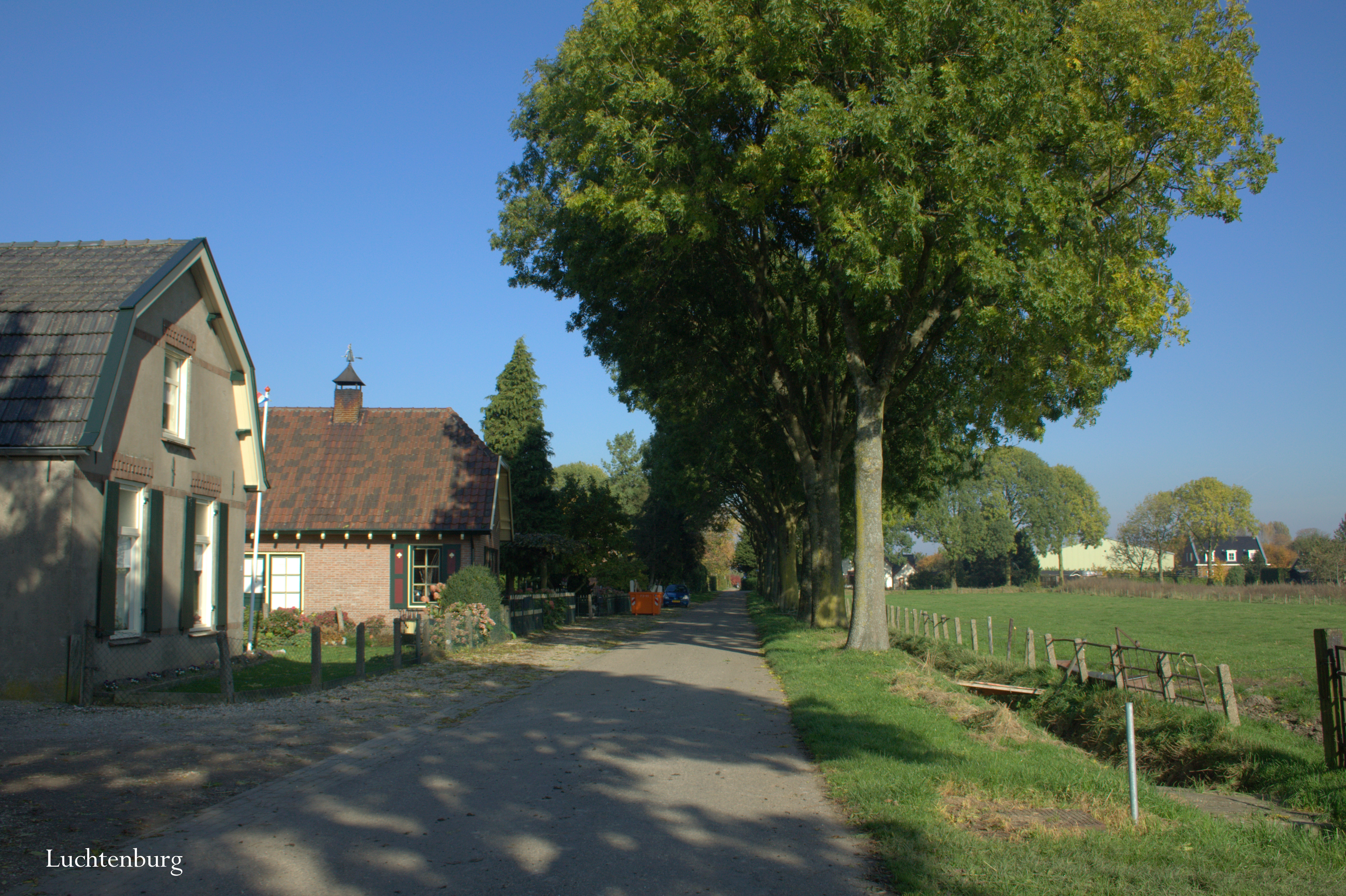
- Street view of Luchtenburg

- Location in the Netherlands Luchtenburg (Netherlands)
- Coordinates: 51°58′11″N 5°29′15″E
- Country: Netherlands
- Province: Gelderland
- Municipality: Buren
- Elevation: 7 m (23 ft)
- Time zone: UTC+1 (CET)
  - Summer (DST): UTC+2 (CEST)
- Postal code: 4031
- Dialing code: 0344

Luchtenburg is a hamlet in the Dutch province of Gelderland. It is a part of the municipality of Buren, and is located in about 8 km southwest of Veenendaal.

Luchtenburg is not a statistical entity, and the postal authorities have placed it under Ingen. The hamlet consists of about 40 houses.

== Gallery ==
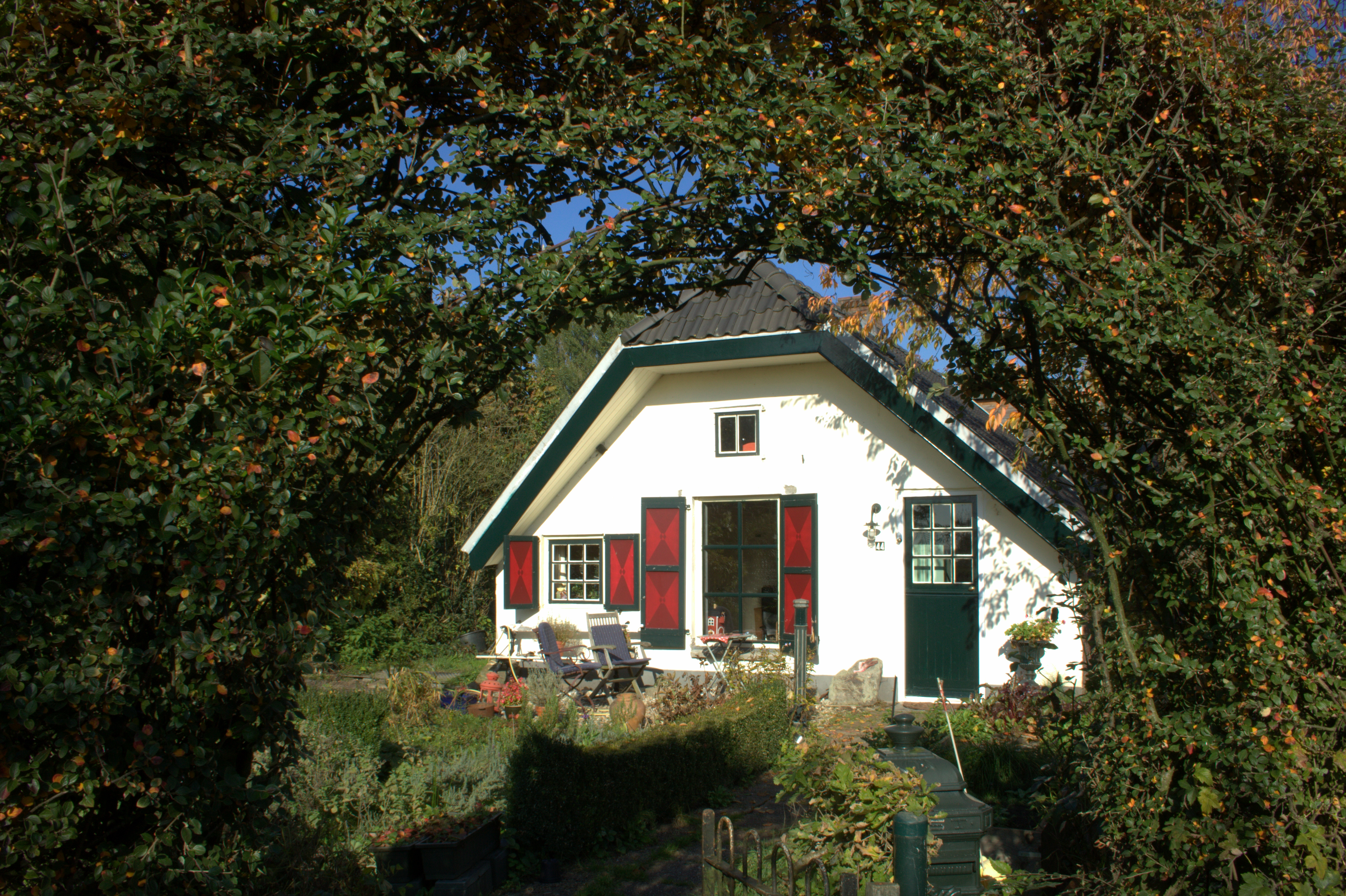
Farm in Luchtenburg

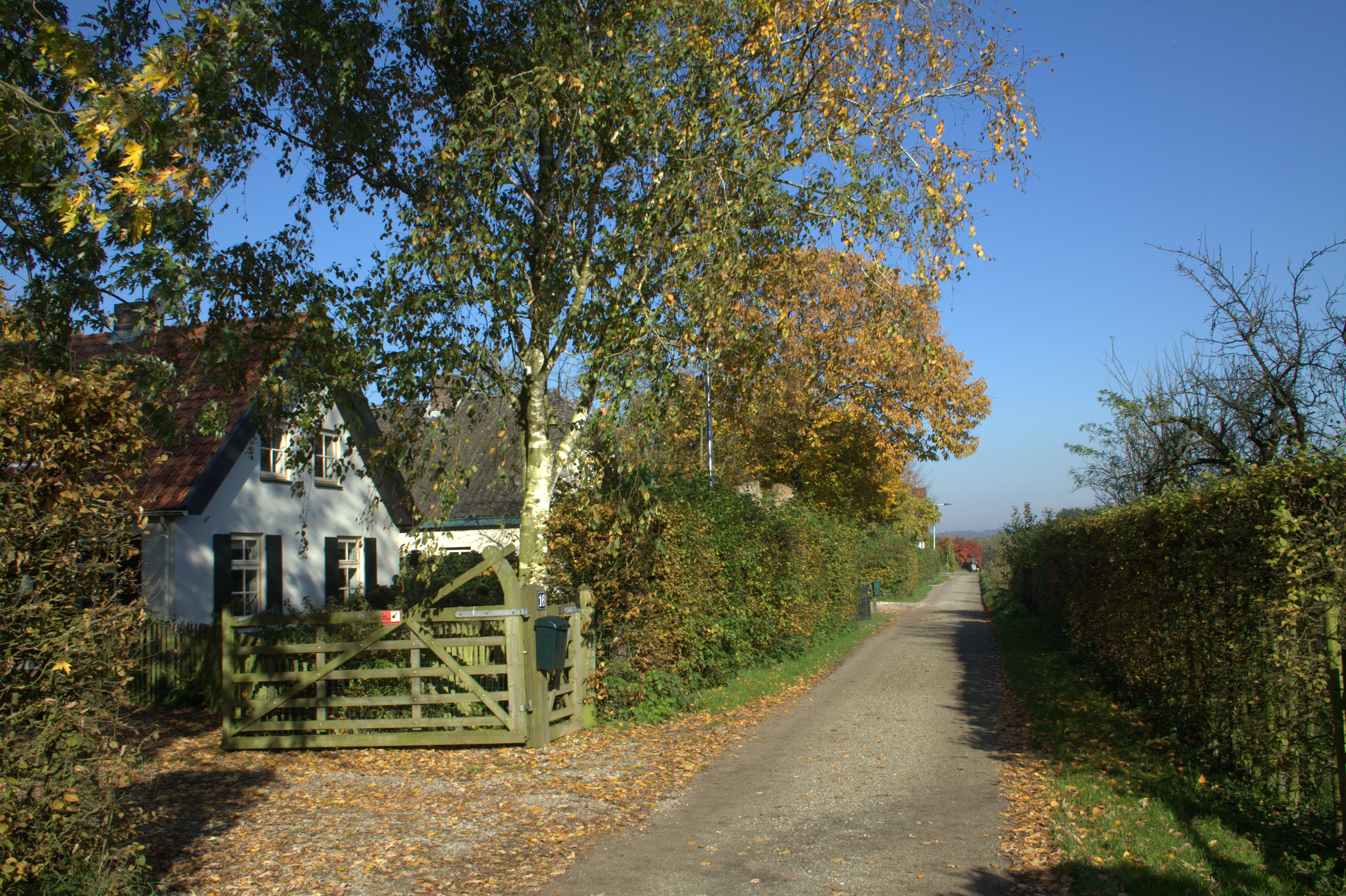
Farm in Luchtenburg
