= Tweesluizen =

- Hamlet
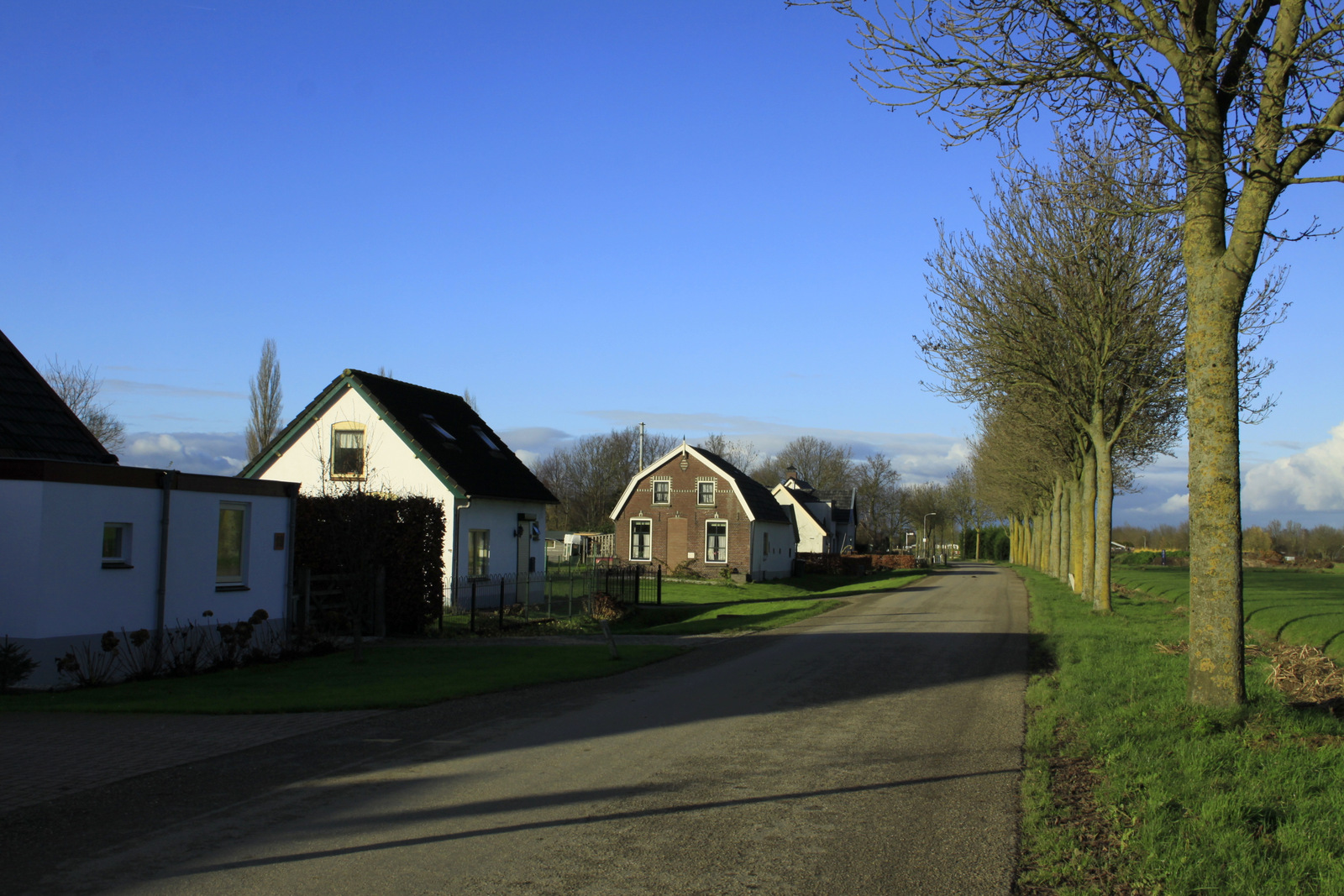
- Streetview

- Location in the Netherlands Tweesluizen (Netherlands)
- Coordinates: 51°53′16″N 5°21′39″E
- Country: Netherlands
- Province: Gelderland
- Municipality: Buren
- Elevation: 4 m (13 ft)
- Time zone: UTC+1 (CET)
  - Summer (DST): UTC+2 (CEST)
- Postal code: 4016
- Dialing code: 0344

Tweesluizen is a hamlet in the Dutch province of Gelderland. It is a part of the municipality of Buren, and lies about 4 km west of Tiel.

Tweesluizen is not a statistical entity, and the postal authorities have placed it under Kapel-Avezaath. It was first mentioned in 1899 as Twee Sluizen, and means two sluices. It consists of about 20 houses.
