= Lede en Oudewaard =

- Hamlet and former municipality
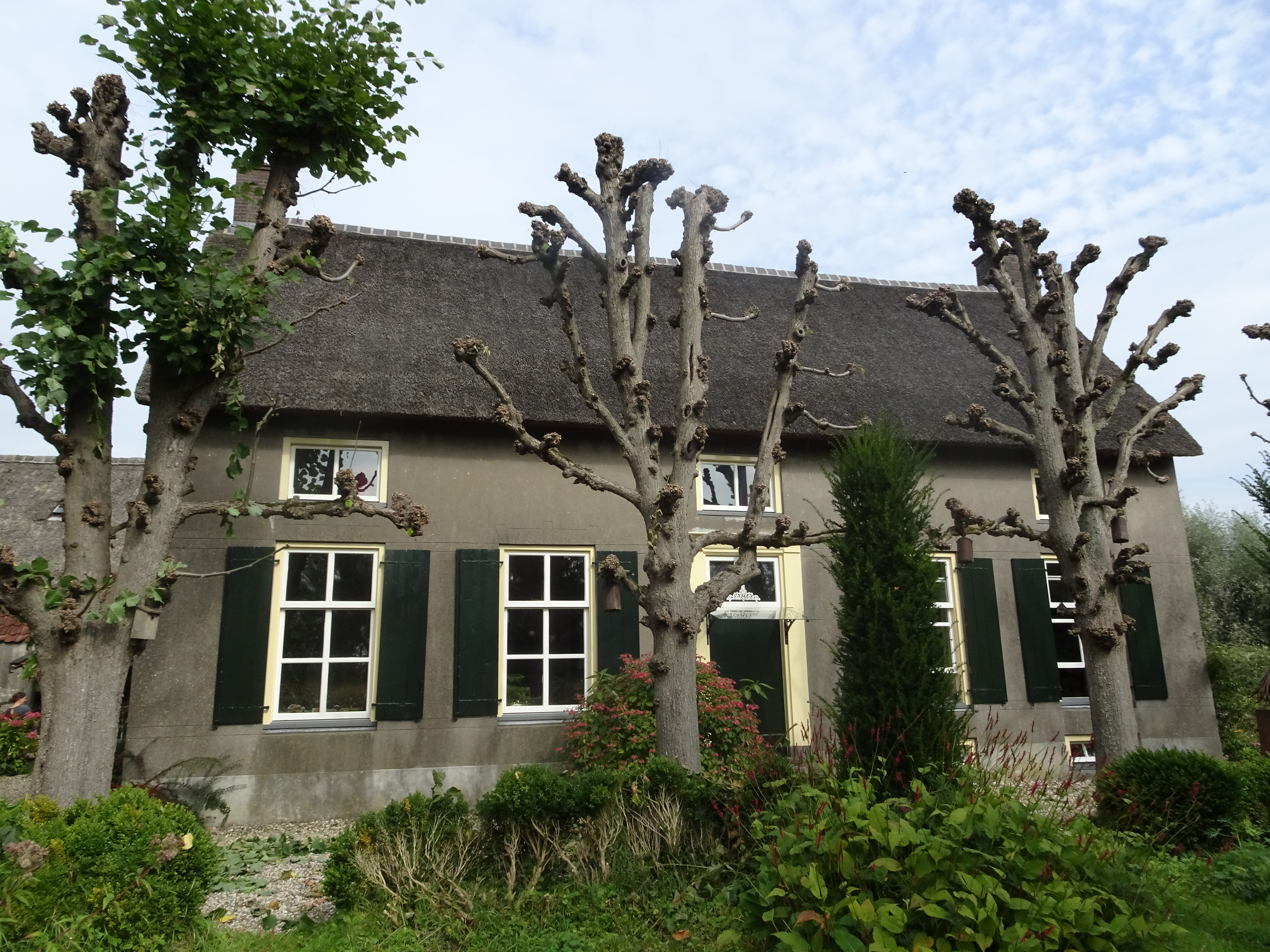
- Farm in Lede en Oudewaard

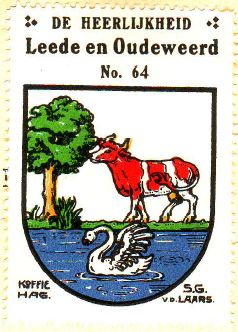
- Coat of arms

- Location in the Netherlands Lede en Oudewaard (Netherlands)
- Coordinates: 51.9403°N 5.5551°E
- Country: Netherlands
- Province: Gelderland
- Municipality: Neder-Betuwe

Area
  - Total: 2.10 km^{2} (0.81 sq mi)
- Elevation: 7 m (23 ft)

Population (2021)
  - Total: 425
  - Density: 202/km^{2} (524/sq mi)
- Time zone: UTC+1 (CET)
  - Summer (DST): UTC+2 (CEST)
- Postal code: 4041
- Dialing code: 0488

Lede en Oudewaard is a hamlet in the Dutch province of Gelderland. It is a part of the municipality of Neder-Betuwe, and lies about 8 km west of Wageningen.

Lede en Oudewaard was a separate municipality between 1818 and 1822, at which time it was merged with Kesteren.

Lede was first mentioned probably in 1235 as ter Lee, and means "dug stream". Oudewaard was first mentioned in 1326 as "de Weert te Kester", and means the old land near water. The postal authorities have placed the hamlet under Kesteren. Until 1800, it was an heerlijkheid. In 1840, it was home to 147 people.
