= Meerten =

- Neighbourhood and former hamlet

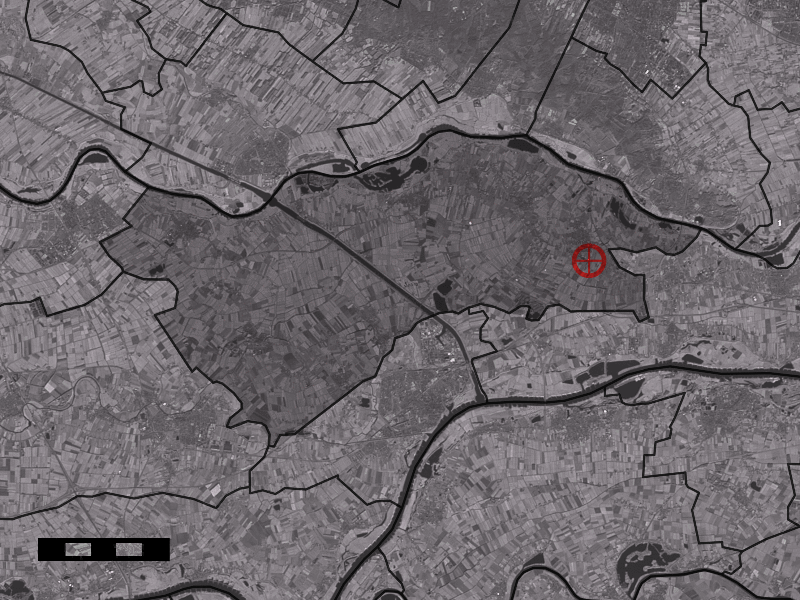
- Meerten in the municipality of Buren.
- Coordinates: 51.93980°N 5.52172°E
- Country: Netherlands
- Province: Gelderland
- Municipality: Buren
- Elevation: 7 m (23 ft)
- Time zone: UTC+1 (CET)
  - Summer (DST): UTC+2 (CEST)
- Postal code: 4033
- Dialing code: 0344

Meerten is a neighbourhood of Lienden and was a hamlet in the Dutch province of Gelderland. It is a part of the municipality of Buren, and lies about 9 km northeast of Tiel.

It was first mentioned in 1145 as Gerardus de Marten. The etymology is unknown. It was annexed by neighbouring Lienden who built an industrial terrain near the hamlet. In 2008, construction began on the new residential neighbourhood Nieuw-Meerten.

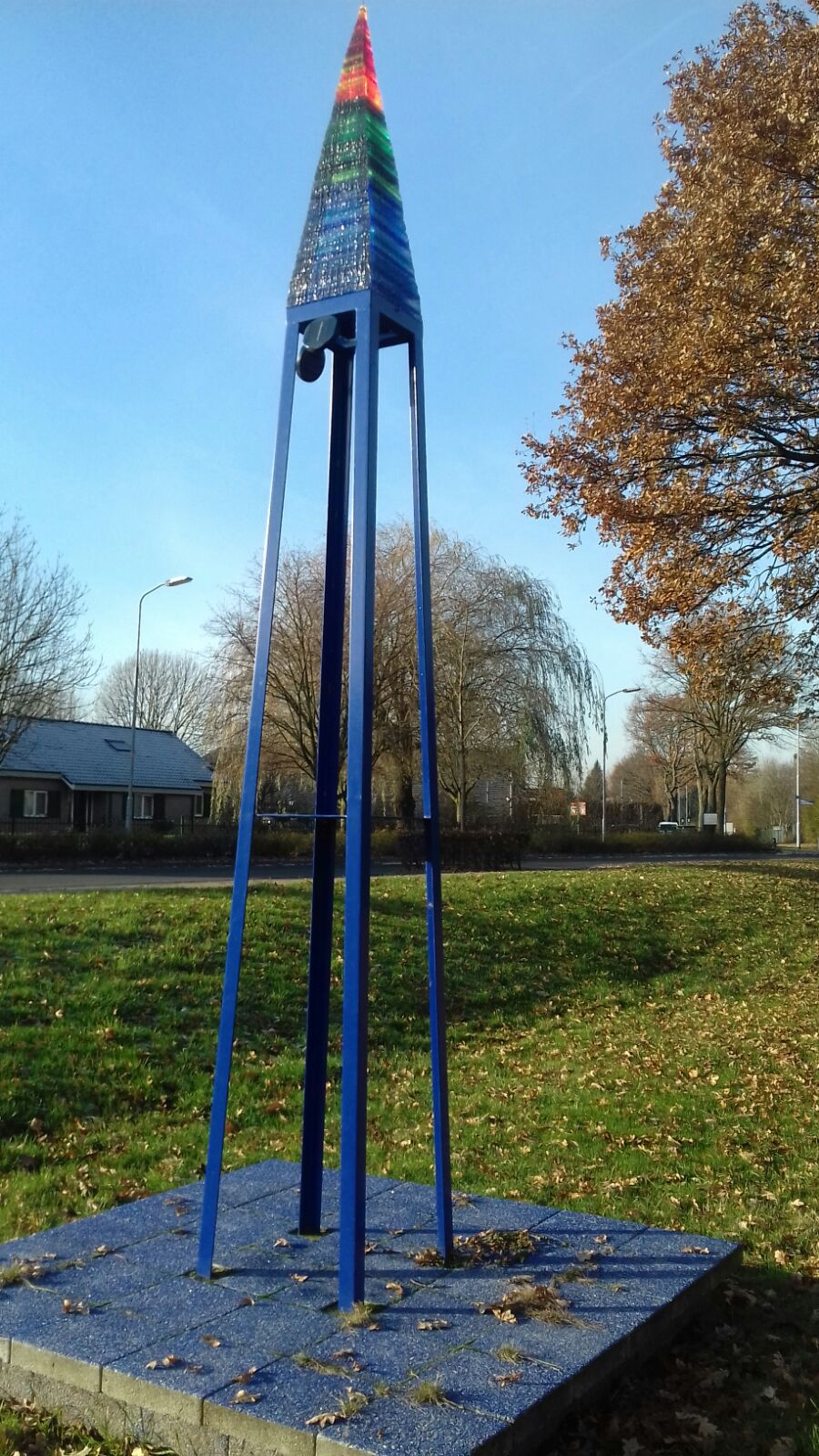
Art in Nieuw-Meerten by Coen Kaayk
