= Hoogmeien =

- Hamlet
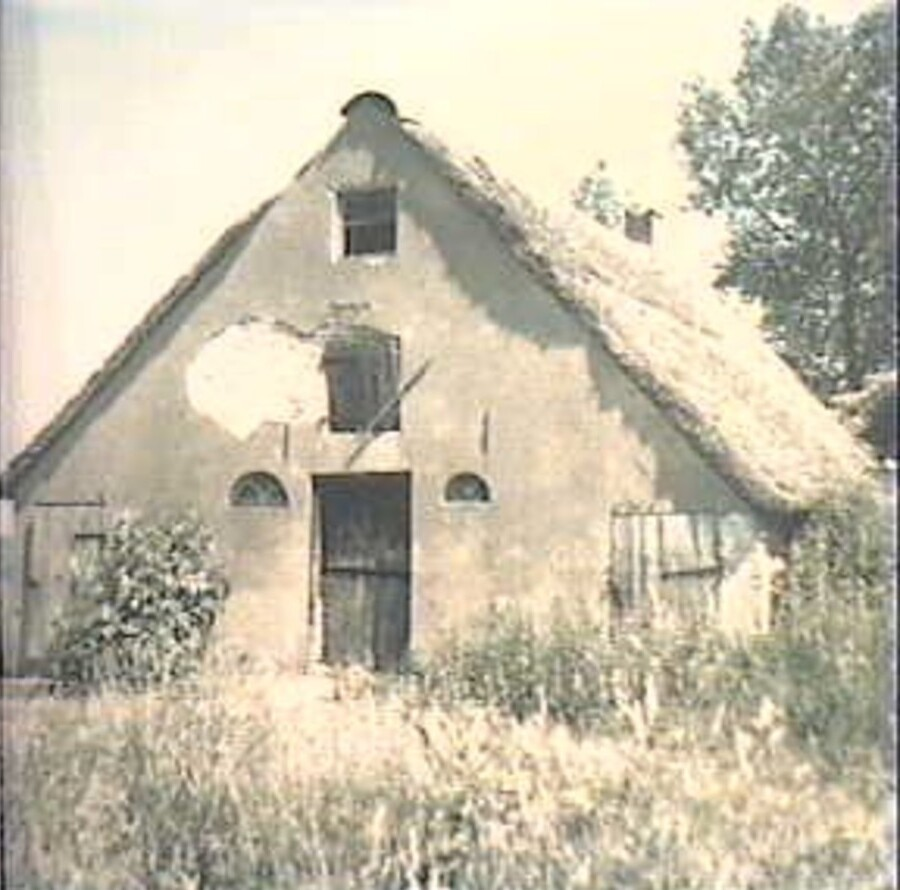
- Farm in Hoogmeien

- Location in the Netherlands Hoogmeien (Netherlands)
- Coordinates: 51°56′05″N 5°30′25″E
- Country: Netherlands
- Province: Gelderland
- Municipality: Buren
- Elevation: 7 m (23 ft)
- Time zone: UTC+1 (CET)
  - Summer (DST): UTC+2 (CEST)
- Postal code: 4033
- Dialing code: 0344

Hoogmeien is a hamlet in the Dutch province of Gelderland. It is a part of the municipality of Buren, and lies about 8 km northeast of Tiel.

It was first mentioned around 1400 as "Homeden en Nedermeden", and means high hay land. It is not a statistical entity, and the postal authorities have placed it under Lienden. It consists of about 25 houses.
