= Ganzert =

- Hamlet
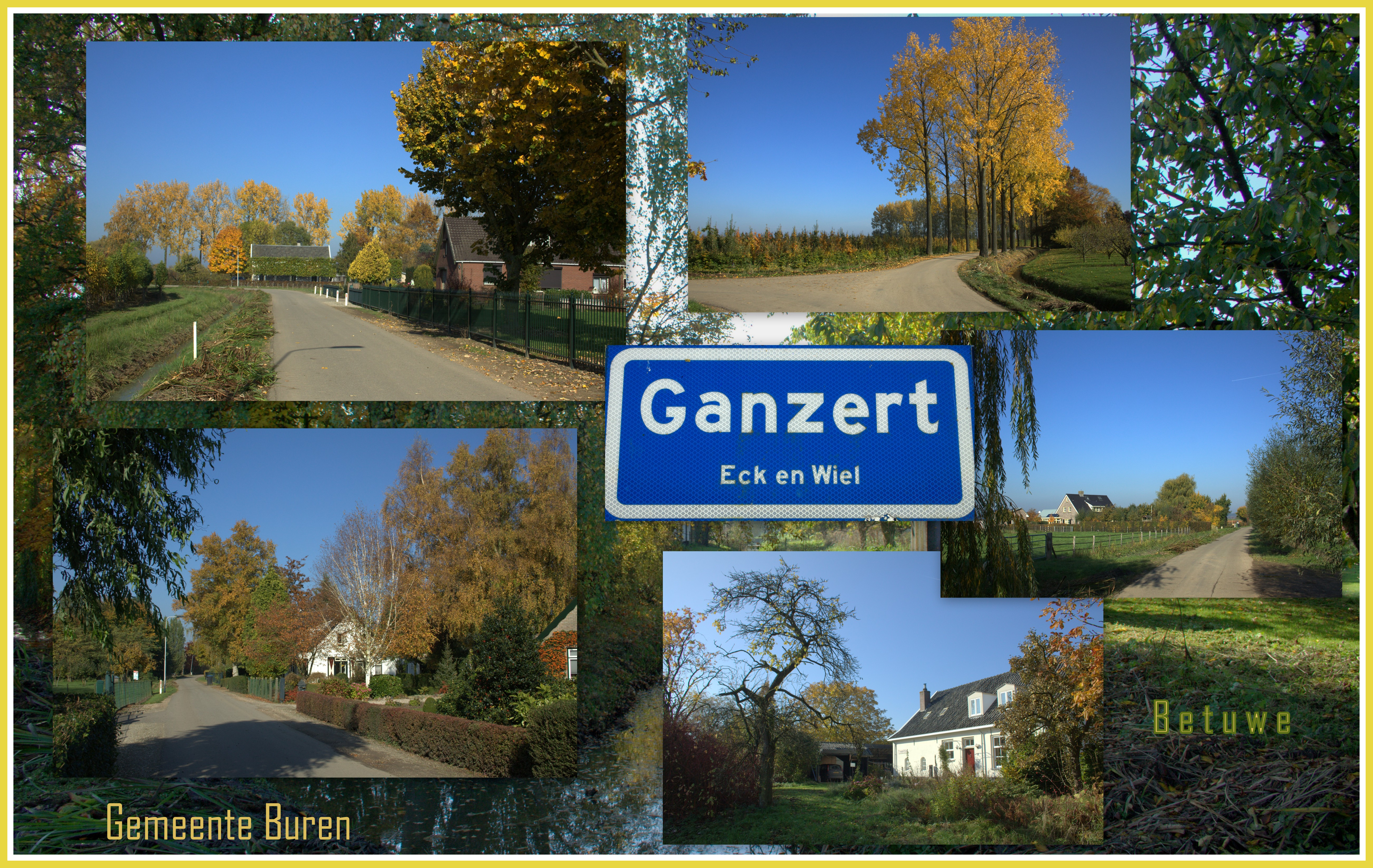
- Postcard from Ganzert

- Location in the Netherlands Ganzert (Netherlands)
- Coordinates: 51°58′0″N 5°28′00″E
- Country: Netherlands
- Province: Gelderland
- Municipality: Buren

Area
  - Total: 0.73 km^{2} (0.28 sq mi)
- Elevation: 7 m (23 ft)

Population (2021)
  - Total: 190
  - Density: 260/km^{2} (670/sq mi)
- Time zone: UTC+1 (CET)
  - Summer (DST): UTC+2 (CEST)
- Postal code: 4031
- Dialing code: 0344

Ganzert is a hamlet in the Dutch province of Gelderland. It is a part of the municipality of Buren, and lies about 8 km southwest of Veenendaal.

It was first mentioned in 1899 as Ganzert (De). The first part means goose, the second part can be either "land near water" or "farmland". The postal authorities have placed it under Ingen. Even though, it is outside the build-up area, it has place name signs with a 30 km/h speed limit.
