= Verwolde =

Coordinates: 52°13′N 6°25′E

Coat of Arms of Heerlijkheid Verwolde

Verwolde is a former municipality in the Dutch province of Gelderland. It existed between 1818 and 1854, when it was merged with Laren. The area is now a part of Lochem.
