= Valentijn =

Valentijn is both a masculine Dutch given name and a surname. It may refer to:

- François Valentijn (1666–1727), Dutch minister, historian and writer
- Jahri Valentijn (born 1984), Dutch footballer
- Marinus Valentijn (1900–1991), Dutch cyclist
- Valentijn Overeem (born 1976), Dutch mixed martial artist and kickboxer
