= De Bosjes =

- Hamlet

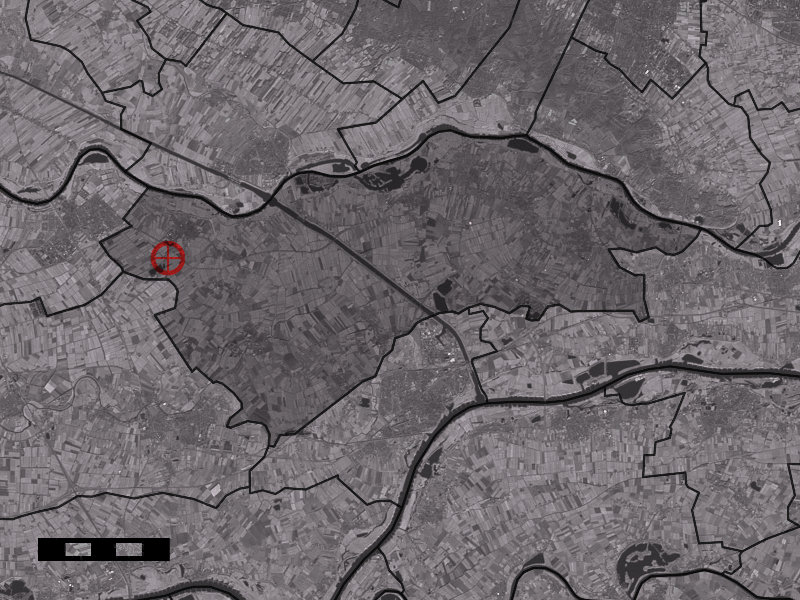
- De Bosjes in the municipality of Buren.
- Coordinates: 51.94080°N 5.28208°E
- Country: Netherlands
- Province: Gelderland
- Municipality: Buren
- Elevation: 3 m (9.8 ft)
- Time zone: UTC+1 (CET)
  - Summer (DST): UTC+2 (CEST)
- Postal code: 4112
- Dialing code: 0345

De Bosjes is a hamlet in the Dutch province of Gelderland. It is a part of the municipality of Buren, and lies about 11 km northwest of Tiel.

De Bosjes is not a statistical entity, and the postal authorities have placed it under Beusichem. The hamlet consists of about 10 houses.
