= Kotten =

- Hamlet
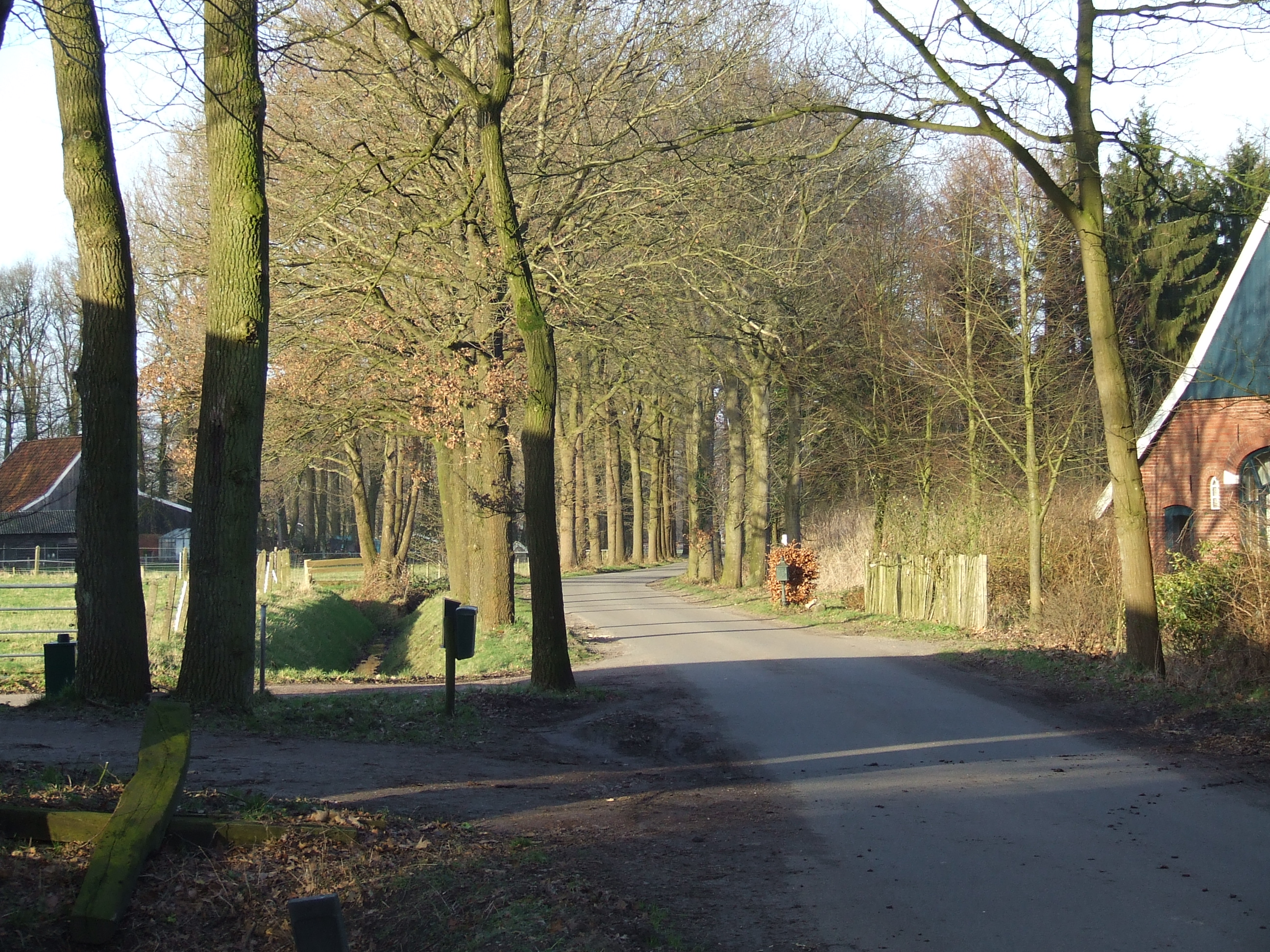
- Geessinkweg in Kotten

- Location in the province of Gelderland in the Netherlands Kotten (Netherlands)
- Coordinates: 51°57′N 6°46′E
- Country: Netherlands
- Province: Gelderland
- Municipality: Winterswijk

Area
  - Total: 11.33 km^{2} (4.37 sq mi)
- Elevation: 42 m (138 ft)

Population (2021)
  - Total: 650
  - Density: 57/km^{2} (150/sq mi)
- Time zone: UTC+1 (CET)
  - Summer (DST): UTC+2 (CEST)
- Postal code: 7107
- Dialing code: 0543

Kotten is a hamlet in the municipality of Winterswijk, in the Netherlands.

It was first mentioned in 1302 as Katen or Koten, and means "little farms/houses".

Kotten was home to 677 people in 1840. Kotten always had good relations with neighbouring Oeding in Germany and both villages used to known for their smuggling activities.

== Notable people ==
- Leonie Hesselink (born 1992), model and television presenter. Miss World Nederland in 1998.

== Gallery ==
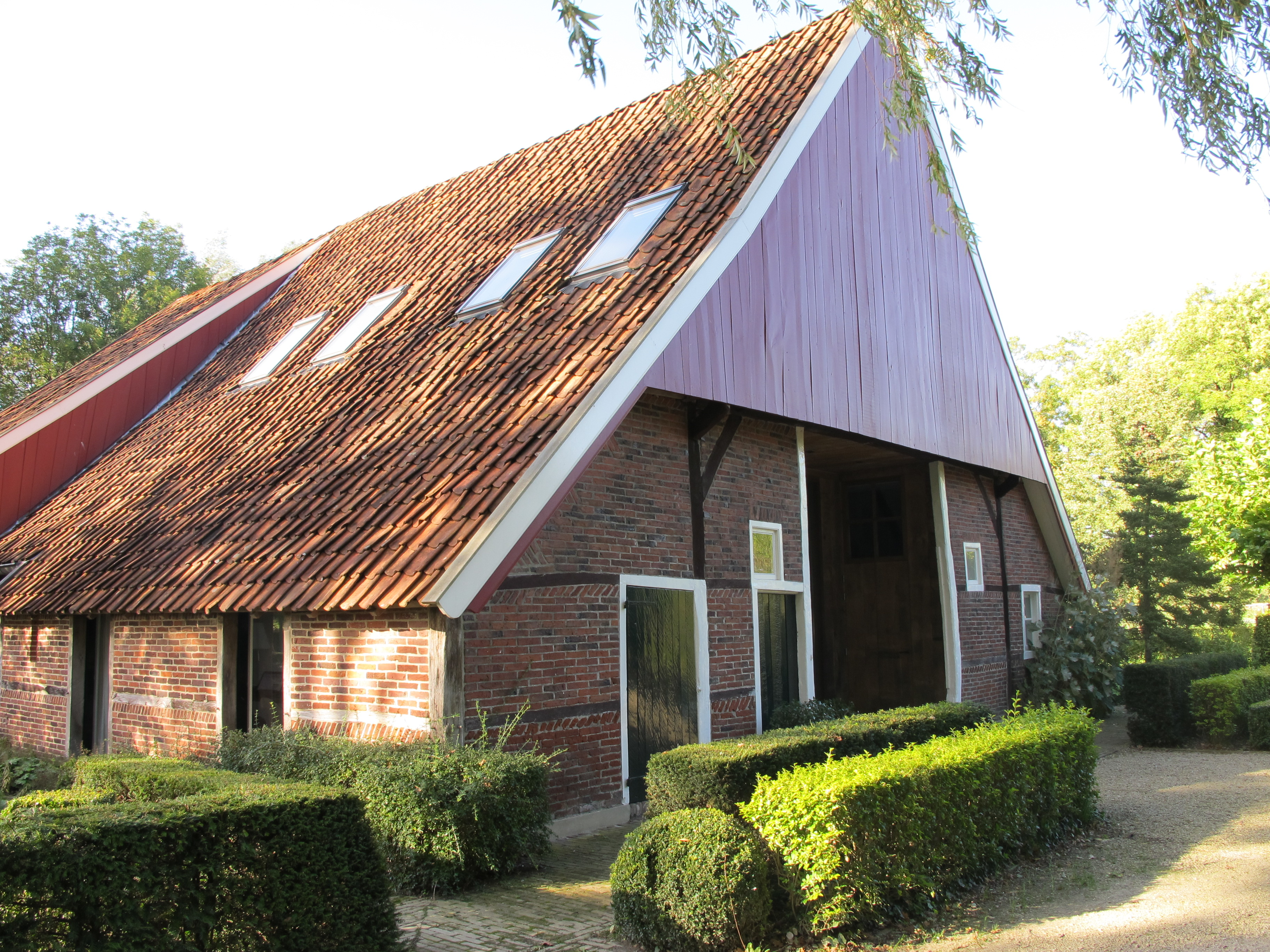
Farm in Kotten

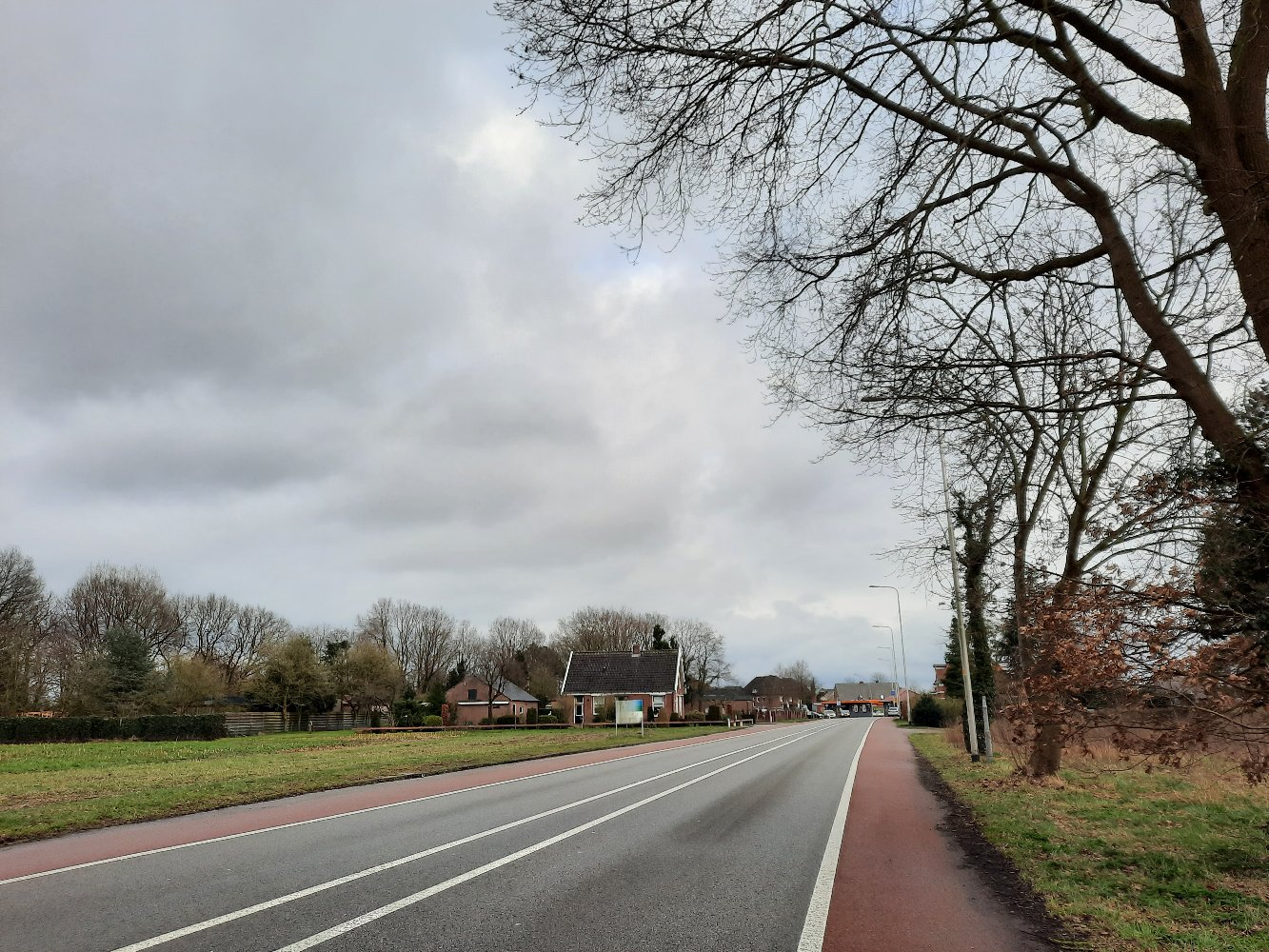
Border crossing

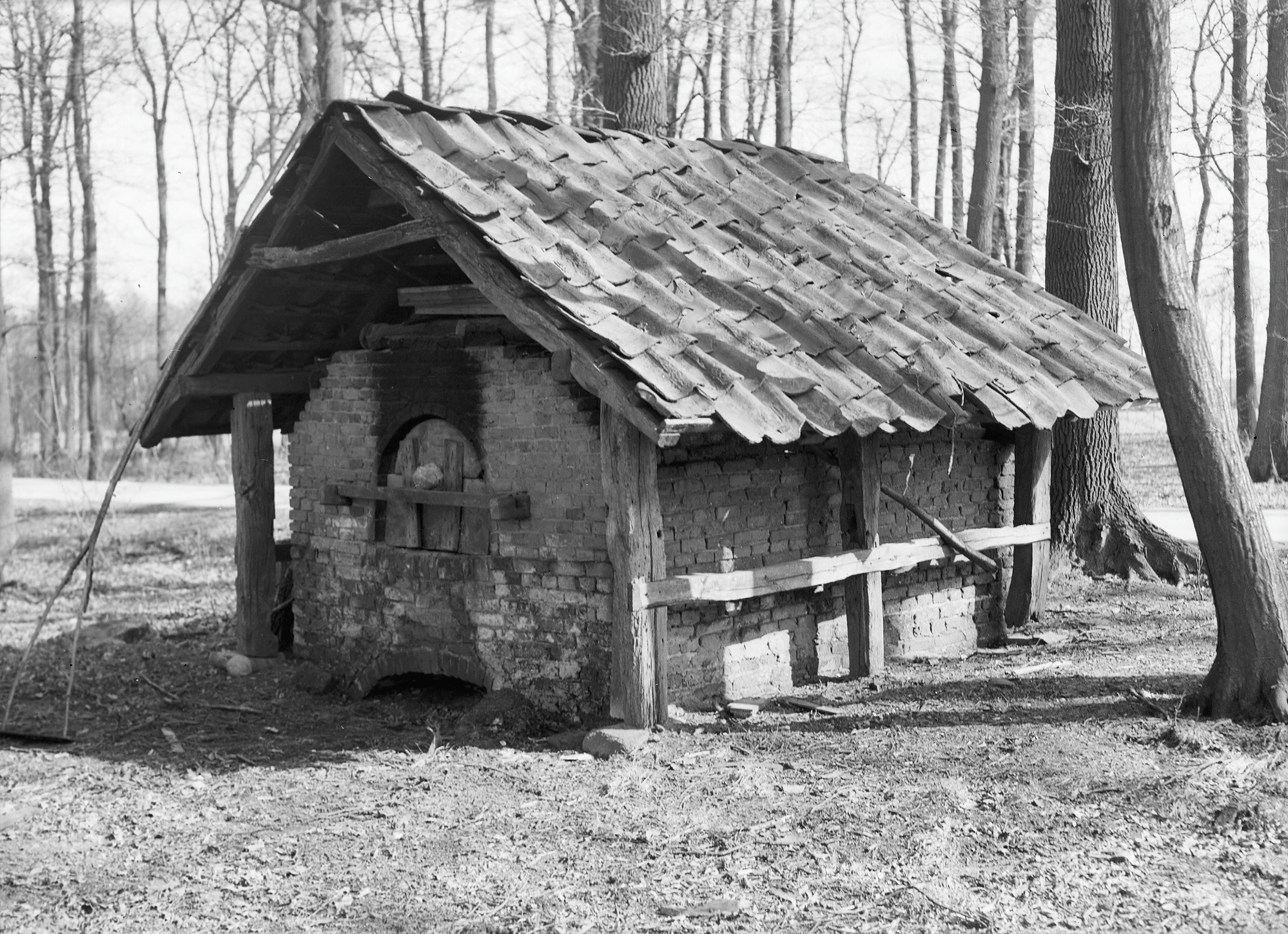
Flax oven

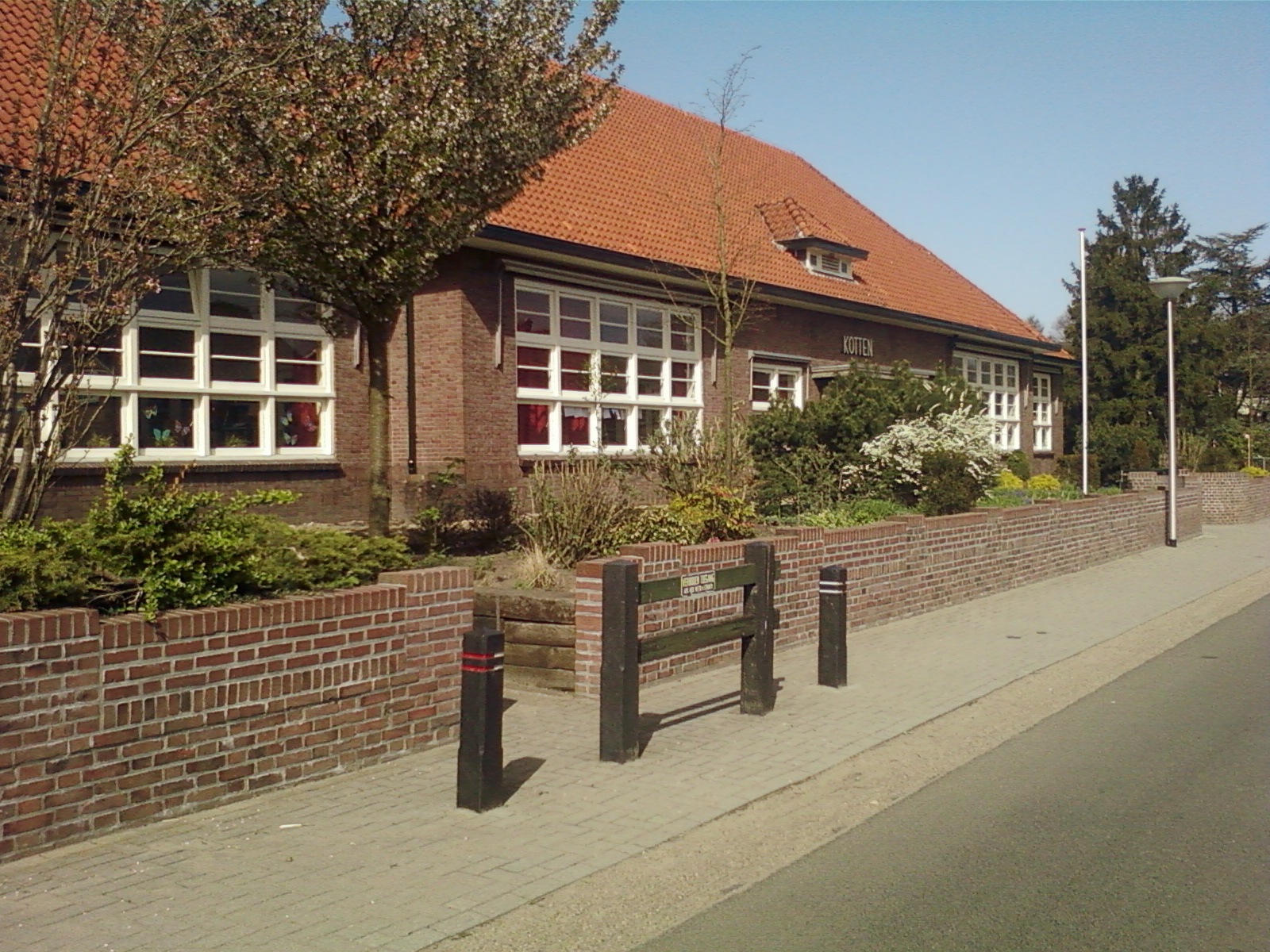
School
