= Zwarte Paard =

- Hamlet
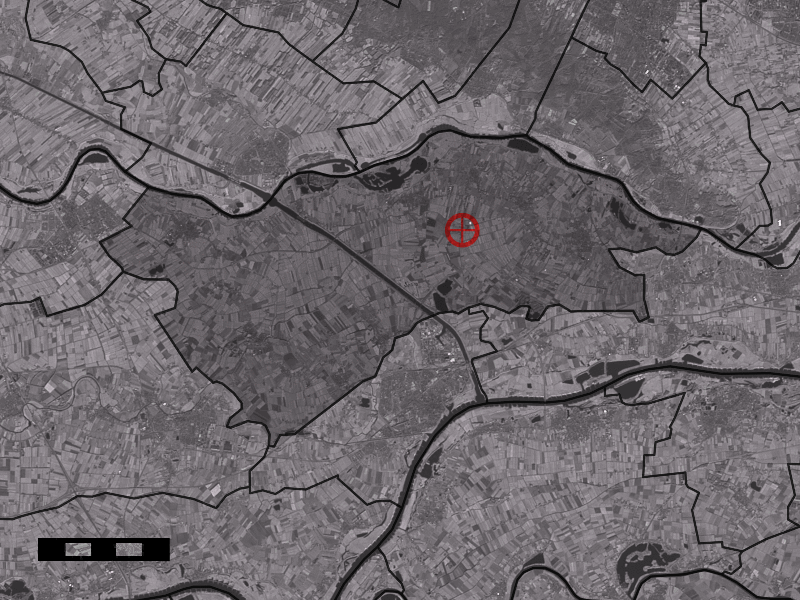

- Location in the Netherlands Zwarte Paard (Netherlands)
- Coordinates: 51°57′03″N 5°27′2″E
- Country: Netherlands
- Province: Gelderland
- Municipality: Buren

Area
  - Total: 5.75 km^{2} (2.22 sq mi)
- Elevation: 7 m (23 ft)

Population (2021)
  - Total: 135
  - Density: 23.5/km^{2} (60.8/sq mi)
- Time zone: UTC+1 (CET)
  - Summer (DST): UTC+2 (CEST)
- Postal code: 4031
- Dialing code: 0344

Zwarte Paard is a hamlet in the Dutch province of Gelderland. It is a part of the municipality of Buren, and lies about 7 km north of Tiel.

It was first mentioned in 1899 as Zwarte Paard, and translates to "black horse", however it is named after a house. The postal authorities have placed Zwarte Paard under Ingen. It consists of about 20 houses.
