= Lutterveld =

- Hamlet
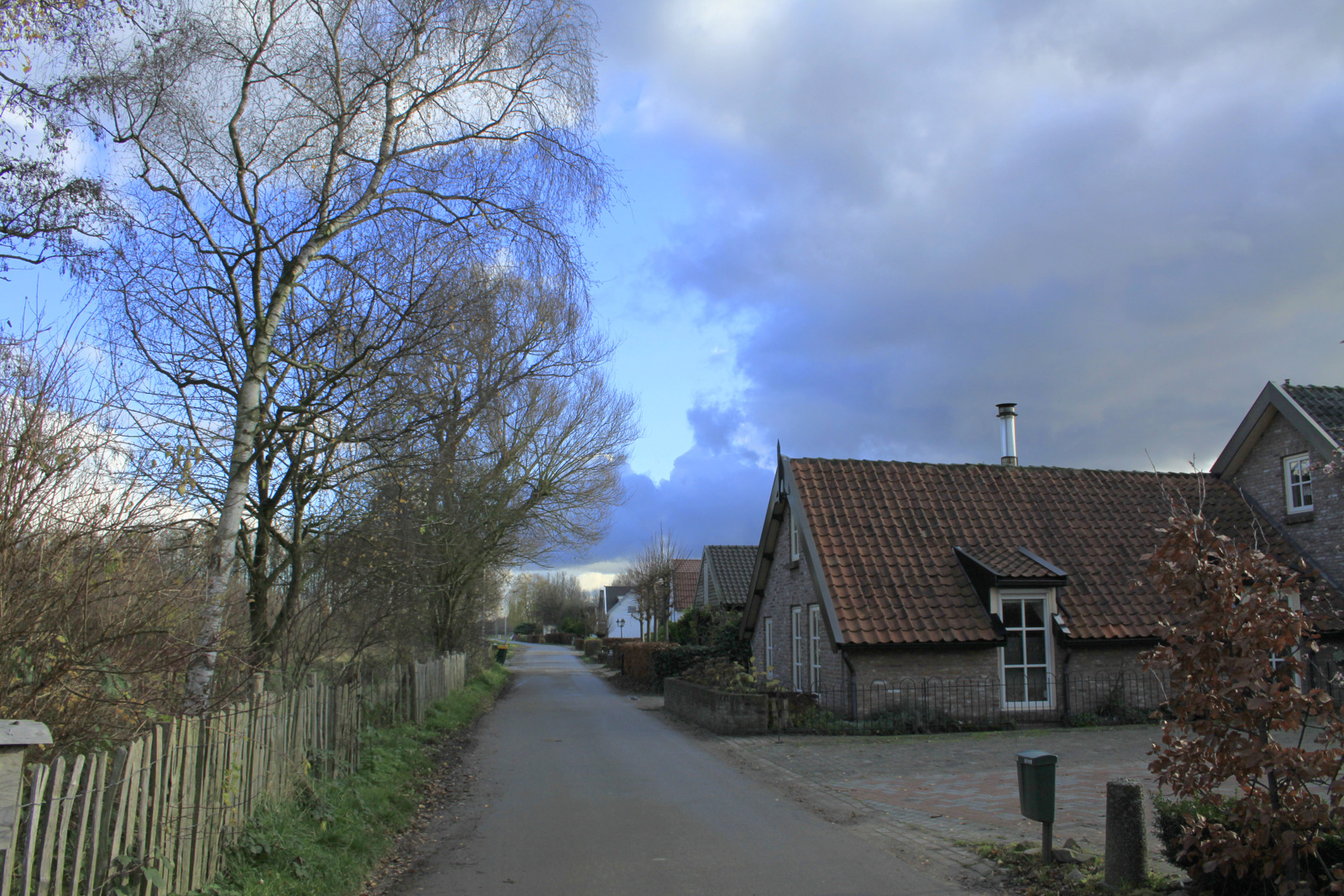
- Street view of Lutterveld

- Location in the Netherlands Lutterveld (Netherlands)
- Coordinates: 51°53′55″N 5°21′09″E
- Country: Netherlands
- Province: Gelderland
- Municipality: Buren
- Elevation: 4 m (13 ft)
- Time zone: UTC+1 (CET)
  - Summer (DST): UTC+2 (CEST)
- Postal code: 4117
- Dialing code: 0345

Lutterveld is a hamlet in the Dutch province of Gelderland. It is a part of the municipality of Buren, and lies about 4 km west of Tiel.

Lutterveld is not a statistical entity, and the postal authorities have placed it under Erichem. It was first mentioned in 1899 as Lutterveld, and means little field to distinguish from Het Grootveld. It consists of about 25 houses.
