= Vossen =

Vossen is a Dutch and German patronymic surname derived from the nickname "Voss" , 'fox'. Notable people with the surname include:

- Elli Vossen, pseudonym of Bep Voskuijl (1919–1983), Dutch secretary who helped conceal Anne Frank
- Jelle Vossen (born 1989), Belgian footballer
- Peter van Vossen (born 1968), Dutch footballer
- Piek Vossen (born 1960), Dutch academic
- Stephan Cohn-Vossen (1902–1936), German mathematician
