= Zevenmorgen =

- Hamlet
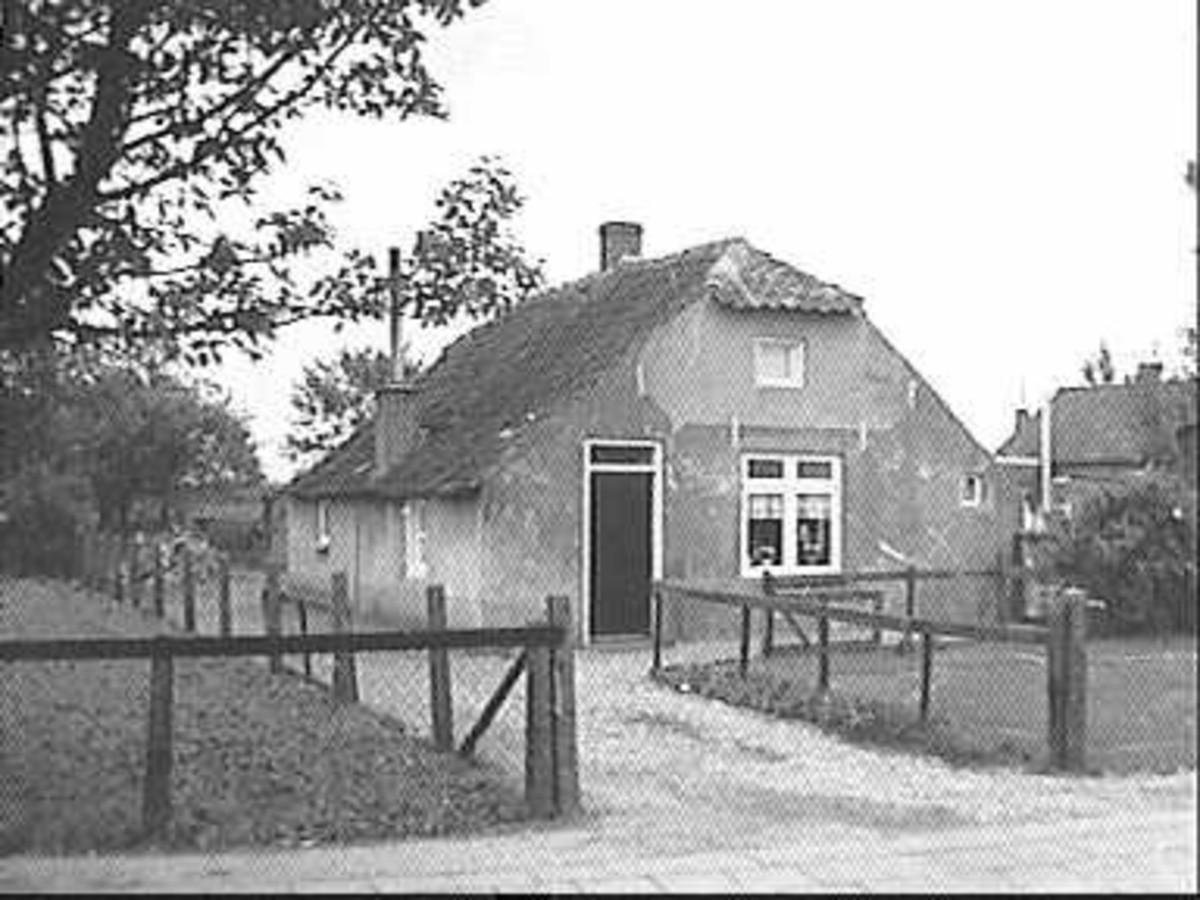
- Farm in Zevenmorgen

- Location in the Netherlands Zevenmorgen (Netherlands)
- Coordinates: 51°57′50″N 5°29′51″E
- Country: Netherlands
- Province: Gelderland
- Municipality: Buren
- Elevation: 7 m (23 ft)
- Time zone: UTC+1 (CET)
  - Summer (DST): UTC+2 (CEST)
- Postal code: 4031
- Dialing code: 0344

Zevenmorgen is a hamlet in the Dutch province of Gelderland. It is a part of the municipality of Buren, and lies about 8 km south of Veenendaal.

Zevenmorgen is not a statistical entity, and the postal authorities have placed it under Ingen. It was first mentioned in 1884 as Zevenmorgen, and means seven morgen (old land measurement unit).
