= Essebroek =

- Hamlet
- Location in the Netherlands Essebroek (Netherlands)
- Coordinates: 51°58′12″N 5°28′44″E
- Country: Netherlands
- Province: Gelderland
- Municipality: Buren
- Elevation: 6 m (20 ft)
- Time zone: UTC+1 (CET)
  - Summer (DST): UTC+2 (CEST)
- Postal code: 4031
- Dialing code: 0341

Essebroek is a hamlet in the Dutch province of Gelderland. It is a part of the municipality of Buren, and lies about 8 km southwest of Veenendaal.

Essebroek is not a statistical entity, and the postal authorities have placed it under Ingen. It was first mentioned in 1913 as Esschenbroek, and means swampy land with ash (Fraxinus excelsior) trees. The hamlet consists of about 20 houses.
