= Meertenwei =

- Hamlet
- Location in the Netherlands Meertenwei (Netherlands)
- Coordinates: 51°56′08″N 5°31′28″E
- Country: Netherlands
- Province: Gelderland
- Municipality: Buren
- Elevation: 7 m (23 ft)
- Time zone: UTC+1 (CET)
  - Summer (DST): UTC+2 (CEST)
- Postal code: 4033
- Dialing code: 0344

Meertenwei is a hamlet in the Dutch province of Gelderland. It is a part of the municipality of Buren, and lies about 9 km northeast of Tiel.

Meertenwei is not a statistical entity, and the postal authorities have placed it under Lienden. The hamlet is located on a dead-end side street of the N320, and consists of about 10 houses.
