= Klinkenberg, South Holland =

Town in the Netherlands

Coordinates: 52.206°N 4.494°E

Klinkenberg is a town in the Dutch province of South Holland. It is located in the municipality of Teylingen, about 2 km southwest of Sassenheim.
