= Klinkenberg, Gelderland =

Klinkenberg
- Hamlet
- Location in the Netherlands Klinkenberg (Netherlands)
- Coordinates: 51°58′02″N 5°29′25″E
- Country: Netherlands
- Province: Gelderland
- Municipality: Buren

Area
  - Total: 6.84 km^{2} (2.64 sq mi)
- Elevation: 7 m (23 ft)

Population (2021)
  - Total: 860
  - Density: 130/km^{2} (330/sq mi)
- Time zone: UTC+1 (CET)
  - Summer (DST): UTC+2 (CEST)
- Postal code: 4031
- Dialing code: 0344

Klinkenberg is a hamlet in the Dutch province of Gelderland. It is a part of the municipality of Buren, and lies about 8 km southwest of Veenendaal.

It was first mentioned in 1845 as Klinkenberg. Both clinge and berg mean hill. The postal authorities have placed it under Ingen.
