= Corle =

Corle is a surname. Notable people with the surname include:

- Edwin Corle (1906–1956), American writer
- Helen Freeman Corle (1886–1960), American actress

== See also ==
- Carle
- Colle (surname)
