= 1998 Dutch municipal reorganization elections =

- 18 November 1998
- 122 of 10,278 municipal seats up for election
- Turnout: 59.06 % (▲0.18pp)

Municipal reorganization elections were held in the Netherlands on 18 November 1998.

== Background ==
The elections took place in sixteen municipalities that were involved in a reorganization operation implemented on 1 January 1999.

The following municipalities were involved in these elections:

- The municipalities of Buren, Lienden, and Maurik: merged into the new municipality of Buren.
- The municipalities of Deventer and Diepenveen: merged into the new municipality of Deventer.
  - Because this reorganization included a change to the border between Bathmen and Deventer, interim elections were also held in Bathmen.
- The municipalities of Gulpen and Wittem: merged into the new municipality of Gulpen-Wittem.
- The municipalities of Ammerzoden, Hedel, Heerewaarden, Maasdriel, and Rossum: merged into the new municipality of Maasdriel.
- The municipalities of Brakel, Kerkwijk, and Zaltbommel: merged into the new municipality of Zaltbommel.

In these municipalities, the regular municipal elections of 4 March 1998 were not held.

As a result of these reorganizations, the number of municipalities in the Netherlands decreased from 548 to 538 as of 1 January 1999.

== Results ==
Results of the 1998 Dutch municipal reorganisation elections
Municipality	Eligible voters	Turn-out	Local lists	CDA	PvdA	VVD	D66	GL	SGP	SP	RPF	GPV	CD	Other	Ref
Bathmen	4 020	69.9 % (2 809)	5 (1 205)	1 (346)	2 (473)	3 (645)	0 (134)	—	—	—	—	—	—	—	
Buren	18 933	54.1 % (10 246)	4 (2 468)	3 (1 577)	4 (2 247)	7 (3 214)	1 (717)	—	—	—	—	—	—	—	
Deventer	63 349	50.8 % (32 202)	7 (6 217)	5 (4 512)	10 (8 645)	7 (5 782)	2 (1 896)	4 (3 400)	1 (927)	1 (1 269)	—	—	—	—	
Gulpen-Wittem	12 220	80.1 % (9 790)	9 (5 490)	4 (2 402)	3 (1 339)	1 (500)	—	—	—	—	—	—	—	—	
Maasdriel	17 465	68.9 % (12 025)	4 (2 634)	8 (4 466)	2 (1 311)	5 (2 574)	0 (263)	0 (355)	0 (402)	—	—	—	—	—	
Zaltbommel	18 543	66.8 % (12 378)	—	4 (2 491)	4 (2 477)	4 (2 456)	1 (702)	1 (814)	3 (2 166)	—	2 (1 263)	—	—	—	
Total	134 530	59.1 % (79 450)	29 (18 014)	25 (15 794)	25 (16 492)	27 (15 171)	4 (3 712)	5 (4 569)	4 (3 495)	1 (1 269)	2 (1 263)	—	—	—	
