= Cees van Bruchem =

Dutch politician (born 1950)

Cornelis "Cees" van Bruchem (born 25 February 1950 in Bruchem) is a former Dutch politician. Until 2008, he was a member of the ChristianUnion (ChristenUnie). Before that he was a member of its predecessor the Reformatory Political Federation (RPF). He was a Senator from 1999 to 2003. Previously he was a councillor from Kerkwijk and Zaltbommel, and also an alderman in last one.
