= Vocalise (Rachmaninoff) =

Song by Sergei Rachmaninoff

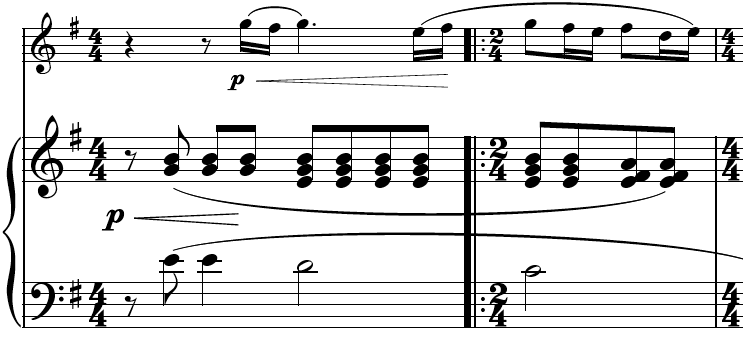
Beginning of the score, transposed into E minor

"Vocalise" is a song by Sergei Rachmaninoff, composed and published in 1915 as the last of his 14 Songs or 14 Romances, Op. 34. Written for high voice (soprano or tenor) with piano accompaniment, it contains no words, but is sung using only one vowel of the singer's choosing (see also vocalise). It was dedicated to soprano singer Antonina Nezhdanova. It is performed in various instrumental arrangements more frequently than in the original vocal version.

== Range ==
Although the original publication stipulates that the song may be sung by either soprano or tenor voice, it is usually performed by a soprano. Though the original composition is in the key signature of C-sharp minor, it is sometimes transposed into a variety of keys, allowing a performer to choose a vocal range more suitable to the natural voice, so that artists who may not have the higher vocal range of a soprano can perform the song.

== Arrangements ==
"Vocalise" transcribed for violin and piano
Performed by Roxana Pavel (violin) and Monica Pavel-Kissinger (piano)

"Vocalise" for orchestra (1929 recording)
Rachmaninoff conducts his own arrangement for orchestra (Philadelphia Orchestra)

"Vocalise" has been arranged for many instrumental and vocal combinations. Examples are:

=== For/with orchestra ===
- for orchestra, arranged by Rachmaninoff himself, also by Morton Gould, Kurt Sanderling
- for soprano and orchestra, also by Rachmaninoff himself
- for choir and orchestra, arranged by Norman Luboff
- for flute and orchestra, arranged by Charles Gerhardt

=== For chamber ensemble ===
- for piano trio (violin, cello and piano), arranged by the Eroica Trio
- for piano trio (soprano, oboe and piano), arranged by Andrew Bayles
- for jazz ensemble, arranged by Don Sebesky

=== For solo instrument and piano ===
- for alto flute and piano, arranged by James Guthrie
- for clarinet and piano, arranged by Stanley Drucker
- for trumpet and piano, arranged by Romain Leleu
- for trombone and piano, arranged by Christian Lindberg
- for euphonium and piano, arranged by Steven Mead
- for violin and piano, arranged by Jascha Heifetz
- for violin and piano, arranged by Karl Gutheil
- for viola and piano, arranged by Leonard Davis, English viola player
- for viola and piano, arranged by Paul Silverthorne
- for cello and piano, arranged by Anatoliy Brandukov
- for cello and piano, arranged by Jascha Heifetz and Mstislav Rostropovich
- for cello and piano, arranged by Raphael Wallfisch
- for double bass and piano, arranged by Stuart Sankey
- for double bass and piano, arranged by Oscar G. Zimmerman (in D minor)
- for saxophone and piano, arranged by John Harle
- for horn and piano, transcribed by Himie Voxman
- for bassoon and piano, arranged by Leonard Sharrow (in C minor)
- for theremin and piano, arranged by Clara Rockmore
- for flute and piano, arranged by Robert Stallman
- for oboe and piano, arranged by Humbert Lucarelli

=== For solo instrument ===
- for solo piano, many arrangements, including by Alexander Siloti, Alan Richardson (1951), Zoltán Kocsis, Earl Wild, Sergio Fiorentino
- for organ, arranged by Cameron Carpenter
- for double bass, arranged by Gary Karr
- for guitar, arranged by Slash
- for saxophone, arranged by Larry Teal
- for theremin, arranged by Thorwald Jørgensen
- for trumpet, arranged by Rolf Smedvig

=== Other ===
- for piano four hands, arranged by Greg Anderson (2009)
- for two pianos, arranged by Vitya Vronsky
- for electronic instruments, arranged by Isao Tomita
- for cello with voice, arranged by Bobby McFerrin and Yo-Yo Ma

== Derivative works ==
Richard Smallwood adopted the main theme of "Vocalise" as the basis for his composition "The Resurrection", the final cut on The Richard Smallwood Singers' debut recording in 1982.

The Pet Shop Boys song "Happiness Is an Option" on their 1999 album Nightlife incorporates a large portion of the "Vocalise" melody in each verse, performed on oboe as background material beneath the spoken text.

In his 1987 album titled I Predict 1990, Christian alternative rock artist Steve Taylor used part of "Vocalise" for the introduction to the last song on the album, "Harder to Believe Than Not To." In 1994, the Christian rock duo Fleming and John covered Taylor's song on the tribute album, I Predict a Clone, and included "Vocalise" in the introduction as well.
