= Nieuwaal =

- Village
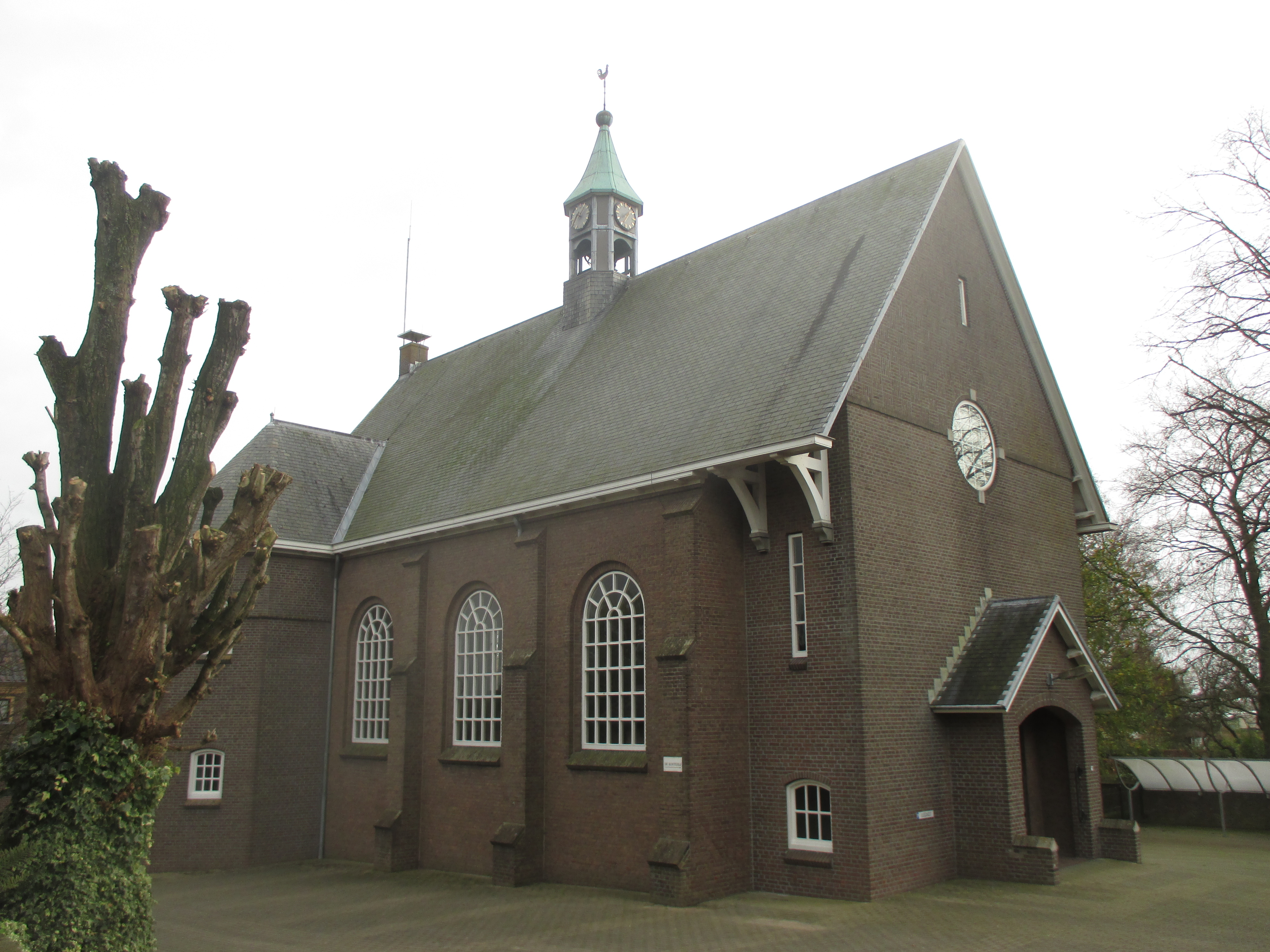
- Protestant Church Nieuwaal

- Location in the Netherlands Nieuwaal (Netherlands)
- Coordinates: 51°48′36″N 5°10′42″E
- Country: Netherlands
- Province: Gelderland
- Municipality: Zaltbommel

Area
  - Total: 12.02 km^{2} (4.64 sq mi)
- Elevation: 4 m (13 ft)

Population (1 January 2010)
  - Total: 1,265
  - Density: 105.2/km^{2} (272.6/sq mi)
- Time zone: UTC+1 (CET)
  - Summer (DST): UTC+2 (CEST)
- Postal code: 5311 & 5315

Nieuwaal is a village in the Dutch province of Gelderland. It is a part of the municipality of Zaltbommel, and lies about 14 km east of Gorinchem.

It was first mentioned in 1146 as Nivelen, and either means "settlement near low-lying land" or "new house". The popular explanation Nieuw Waal (New Waal) is incorrect. In 1840, it was home to 326 people.

== Gallery ==
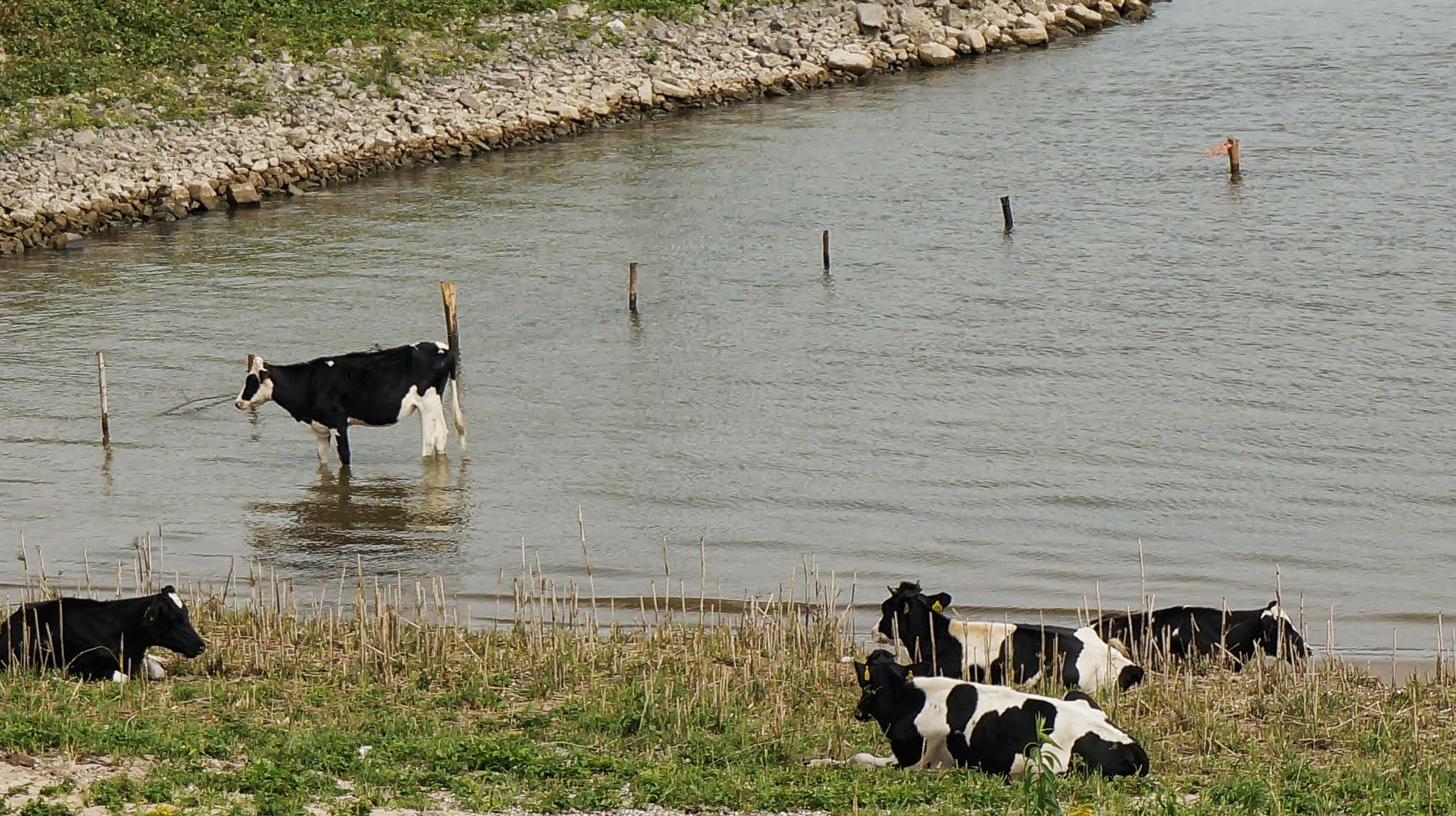
Cows near Nieuwaal

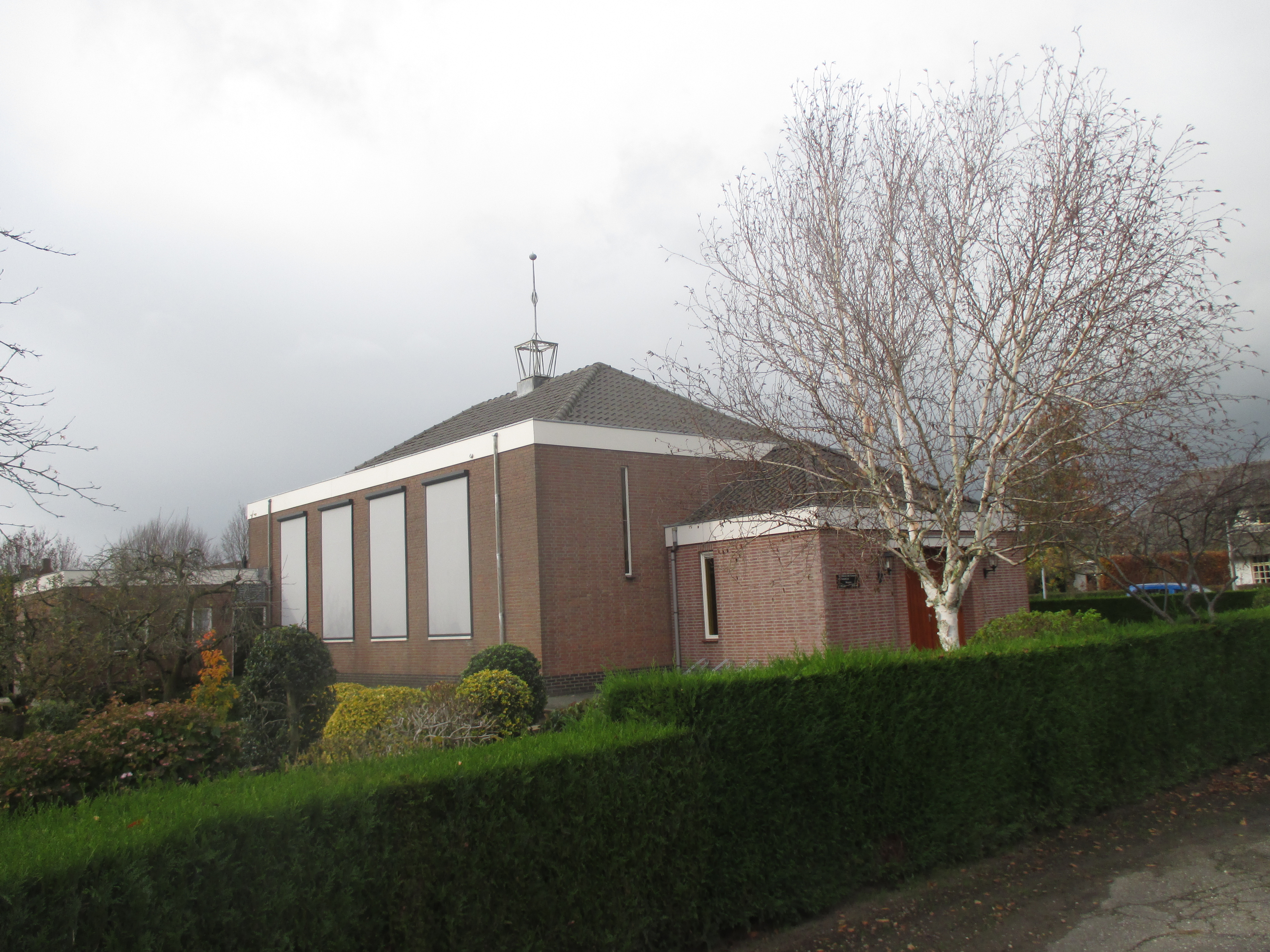
Restored Reformed Church
