= Delwijnen =

- Village
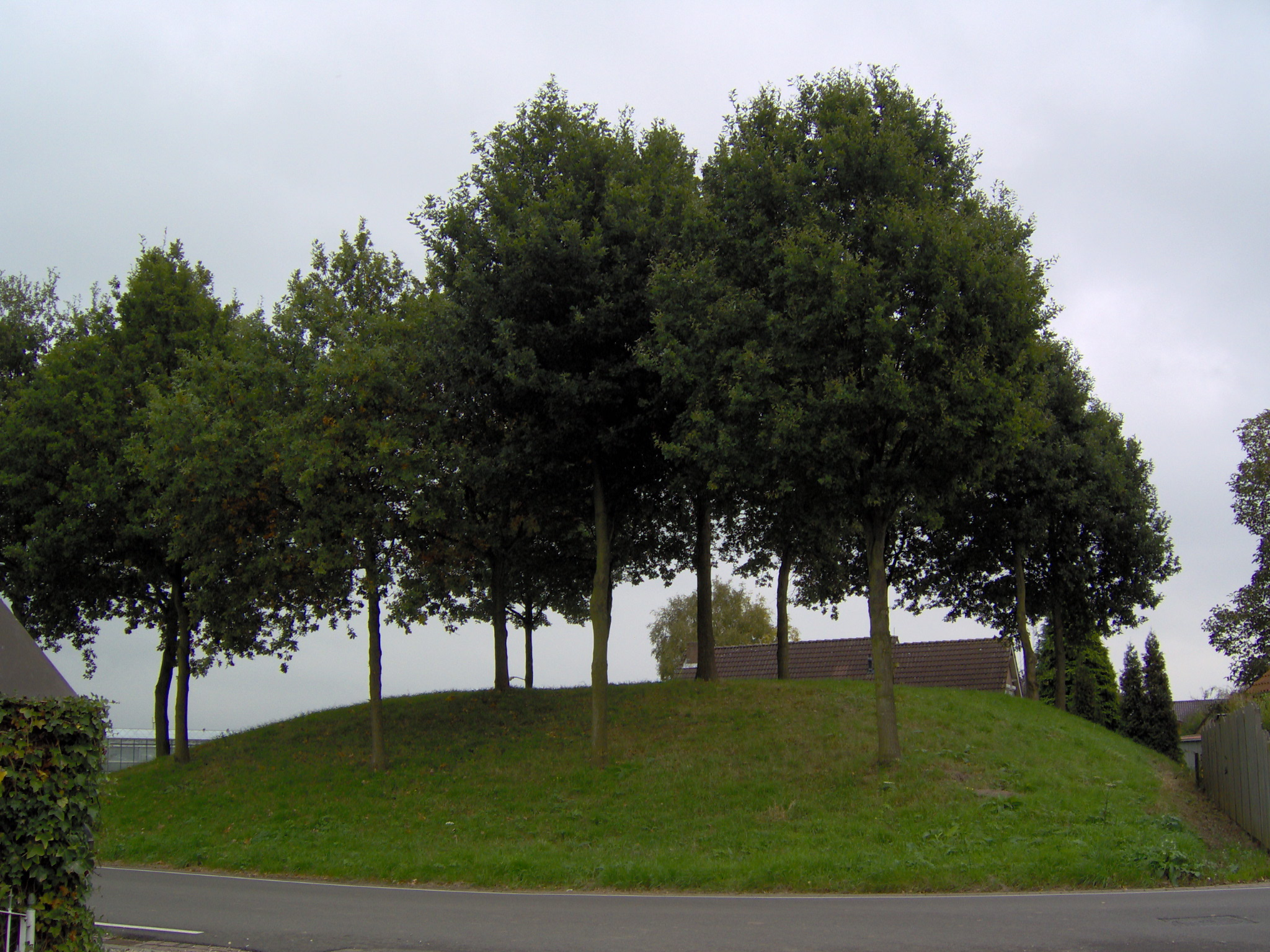
- The hill of Delwijnen

- Location in the Netherlands Delwijnen (Netherlands)
- Coordinates: 51°46′8″N 5°11′14″E
- Country: Netherlands
- Province: Gelderland
- Municipality: Zaltbommel

Area
  - Total: 8.64 km^{2} (3.34 sq mi)
- Elevation: 2 m (6.6 ft)

Population (2021)
  - Total: 535
  - Density: 61.9/km^{2} (160/sq mi)
- Time zone: UTC+1 (CET)
  - Summer (DST): UTC+2 (CEST)
- Postal code: 5316
- Dialing code: 0418

Delwijnen is a village in the Dutch province of Gelderland. It is a part of the municipality of Zaltbommel, and lies about 12 km northwest of 's-Hertogenbosch.

It was first mentioned in the 13the century as Dilevuinne. The etymology is unclear. Raoul de Châtillon was a French knight who moved to Gelre after a dispute with the King of France. Around 1360, the castle Hoge Huys was built near Delwijnen. In 1520, the castle was destroyed by Charles V, Holy Roman Emperor. In 1840, Delwijnen was home to 258 people.
