= Bruchem =

- Village
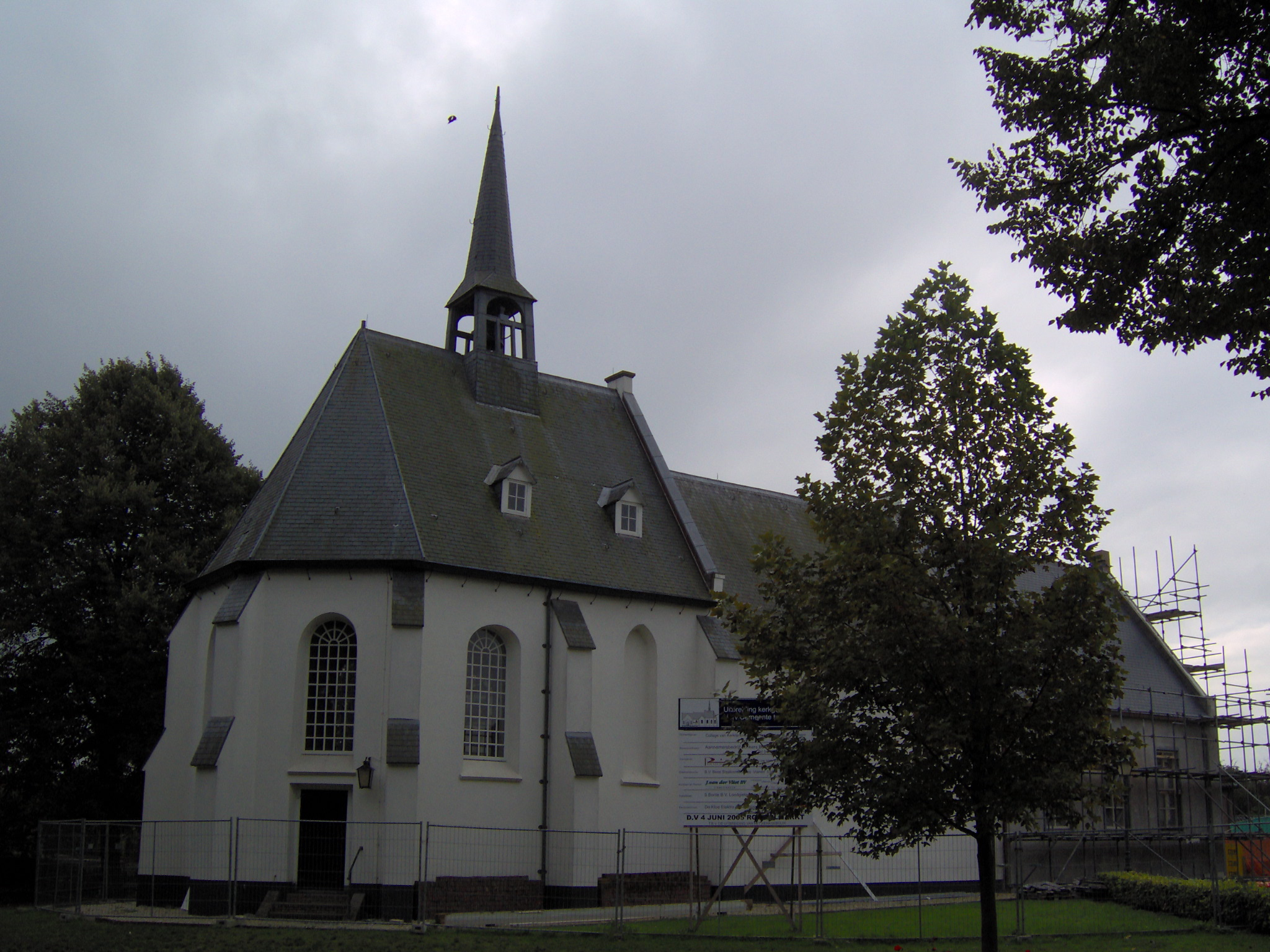

- Location in the Netherlands Bruchem (Netherlands)
- Coordinates: 51°47′7″N 5°14′12″E
- Country: Netherlands
- Province: Gelderland
- Municipality: Zaltbommel

Area
  - Total: 16.23 km^{2} (6.27 sq mi)
- Elevation: 3 m (9.8 ft)

Population (2021)
  - Total: 2,090
  - Density: 129/km^{2} (334/sq mi)
- Time zone: UTC+1 (CET)
  - Summer (DST): UTC+2 (CEST)
- Postal code: 5314
- Dialing code: 0418

Bruchem is a village in the Dutch province of Gelderland. It is a part of the municipality of Zaltbommel, and lies about 11 km north of 's-Hertogenbosch.

Bruchem was a separate municipality, which was renamed in 1818, to "Kerkwijk".

It was first mentioned in the first quarter of the 13th century as Bruchem, and means "settlement on swampy land". There is an 868 reference to Brucheim, however it is not clear whether it is the same settlement. The village developed into a stretched out esdorp. The nave of the Protestant church dates from around 1300, and the choir dates from the 14th century. In 1840, Bruchem was home to 452 people.

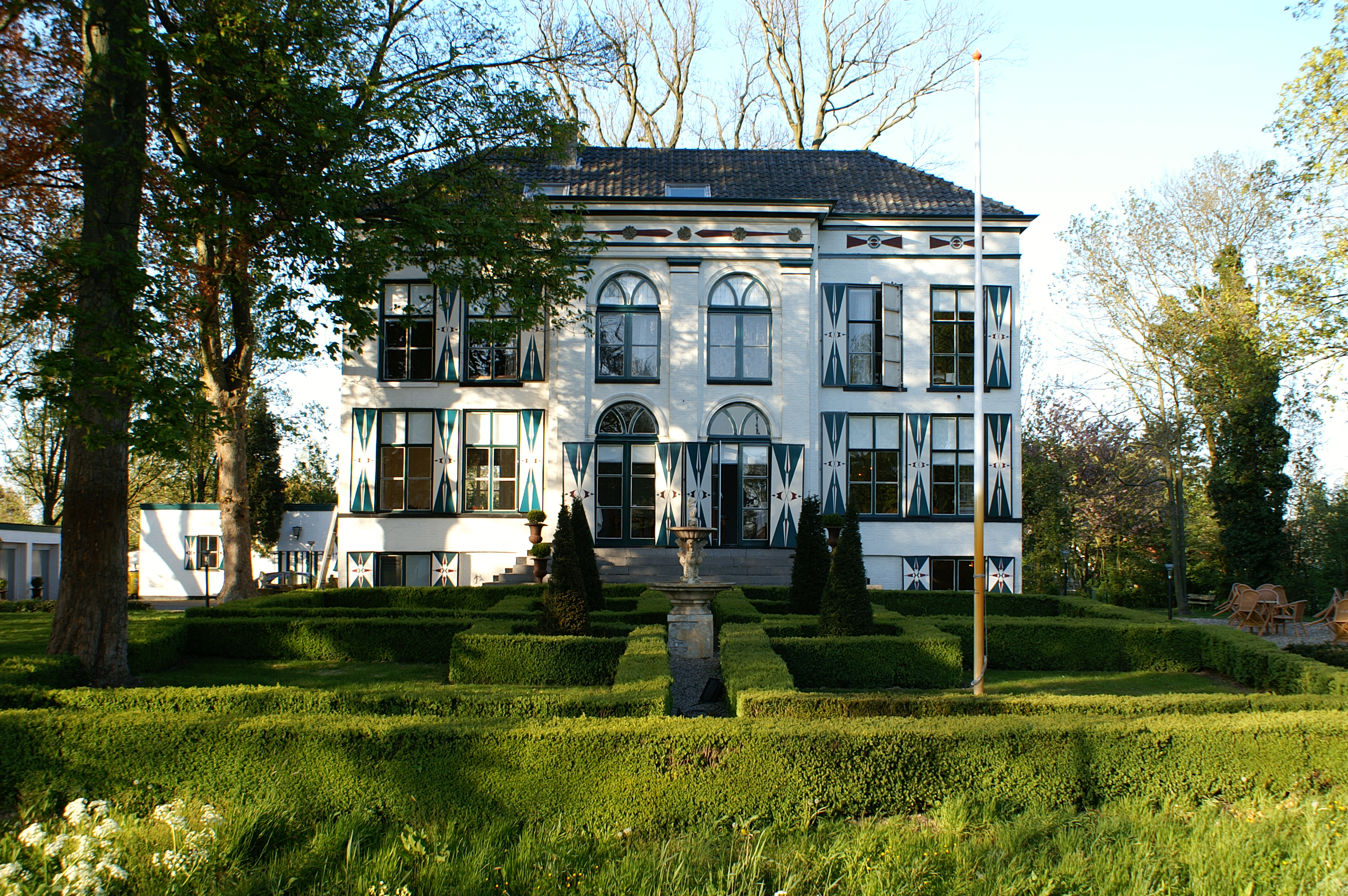
Villa Groenhoven
