= Greg Anderson (pianist) =

American pianist, composer, video producer, and writer

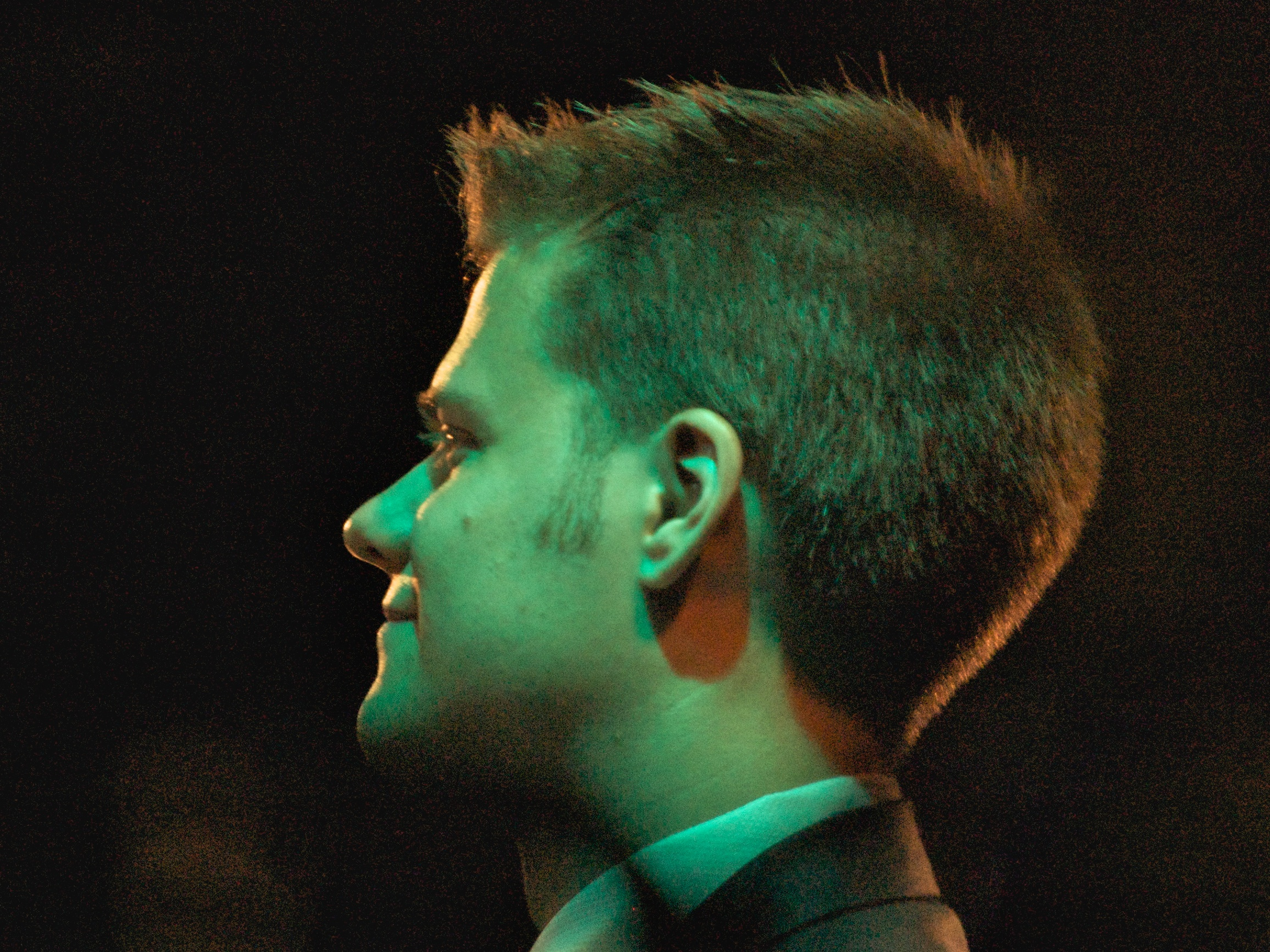
- Anderson playing a recital in Barbados
- Born: Gregory Neil Anderson; September 28, 1981 (age 44); St. Paul, Minnesota, United States
- Education: The Juilliard School, Yale
- Occupations: Pianist, composer, video producer, writer
- Spouse: Carl Berdahl (2010–present)
- Website: gregandersonpiano.com

Greg Anderson (born September 28, 1981) is an American pianist, composer, video producer, and writer. According to his website, Anderson's mission is to "make classical piano music a relevant and powerful force in society."

== Early life ==
Born in St. Paul, Minnesota, Anderson began his piano studies at age seven with Kim Craig, with whom he studied for eleven years, at the Saint Paul Conservatory of Music. He attended the Aspen Music Festival, the Bowdoin International Music Festival, Pianofest in the Hamptons, and the Banff Keyboard Festival.

Anderson studied with Julian Martin at The Juilliard School where he received his Bachelor and Master of Music degrees in Piano Performance in 2004 and 2006. In 2003, Anderson won the Juilliard Concerto Competition, playing Beethoven’s 4th Piano Concerto with the Juilliard Orchestra. He was awarded a scholarship from the Jack Kent Cooke Foundation in 2004. He then studied with Peter Frankl at the Yale School of Music, where he received his Master of Musical Arts (2008) and Doctorate of Musical Arts (2013). Aside from his work in academic settings, Anderson also has a long history of studying with distinguished pianist and pedagogue Aiko Onishi.

== Career ==
=== Solo Pianist ===
As a Steinway Artist, Anderson performs around the world and has released two solo albums.

=== Anderson & Roe piano duo ===
In addition to playing solo performances, Anderson concertizes with his piano duo partner, fellow Steinway Artist Elizabeth Joy Roe. The duo's partnership has been characterized as "the intense synchronization of genius" and "the most dynamic duo of this generation." In the book "Driven: Six Incredible Musical Journeys" Nick Romeo writes, "[Anderson & Roe] hook listeners by putting into practice an expanded concept of what classical music can be: sexy, funny, personal, and interactive." Adrian Daub's book "Four-Handed Monsters" calls Anderson & Roe "one of the most successful piano duos active in the United States," citing the duo's "innovative, frequently pop-inflected repertoire (a few years ago they premiered a four-hand transcription of the Star Wars soundtrack), and their ironic emphasis of the eroticism of four-hand performance."

They are widely known for their daring four-hand piano technique, as described by the Southampton Press: "Their hand movements and the intertwining of arms, and it seemed at times of fingers, was elaborately and brilliantly choreographed. There were times when their hands seemed magically to occupy the same space, though they were playing different notes. The entire process was a small ballet of the hands, as wonderful to watch as to hear."

Their albums on the Steinway Label (When Words Fade, An Amadeus Affair, and The Art of Bach) have spent dozens of weeks at the top of the Billboard Classical Charts.

Anderson & Roe served as webcast hosts for the inaugural Cliburn International Junior Piano Competition and Festival in 2015. They provided competitor information and Competition commentary, and conducted interviews to provide behind-the-scenes insight. Anderson & Roe then served as hosts of the 15th Van Cliburn International Piano Competition and #Cliburn2017 Webcast in 2017.

Anderson & Roe have made orchestral appearances with the San Francisco Symphony, Vancouver Symphony Orchestra, Calgary Philharmonic Orchestra, Rochester Philharmonic Orchestra, Boulder Symphony, Santa Fe Symphony, and Hartford Symphony Orchestra. In 2018 the duo were artists in residence with the Royal Liverpool Philharmonic Orchestra. The duo has performed at Carnegie Hall, David Geffen Hall, Kennedy Center, Herbst Theatre, The National Theater and Concert Hall, Seoul Arts Center, National Centre for the Performing Arts, Auckland Town Hall, Romanian Athenaeum, and Hercules Hall (Herkulessaal) in the Munich Residenz.

In 2017 Anderson & Roe was a recipient of a Club Cumming “YAAAAAAAS” award.

=== Composer ===
Anderson's oeuvre consists of arrangements, fantasies, and original compositions. "[Anderson's] musical paraphrases exhibit many of the traits Franz Liszt developed in his famous paraphrases of Italian opera in the nineteenth century: they're virtuosic and often playful transformations of familiar material into novel forms and styles." Many of the works written for the piano duo are credited in concert programs and on CD notes as being by Anderson & Roe; however, ASCAP and the published scores list Anderson as the sole composer.

Anderson's works have been premiered at the Rose Bowl, Alice Tully Hall, Gilmore Keyboard Festival, and the Grand National Theater in China. His compositions for The 5 Browns and Jenny Lin have appeared on the EMI, Sony/BMG, Steinway, and E1 Entertainment record labels. In 2015, Anderson & Roe premiered Anderson's arrangement of Brahms’ Double Concerto for two pianos and orchestra with the Santa Fe Symphony. His scores are published by Alfred Music on the “Anderson & Roe Duos & Duets Series” and by Awkward Fermata Press.

=== Music video producer ===
Anderson & Roe's self-produced music videos have been showcased at film festivals and nominated for an Emmy Award. Their videos have been viewed over 13 million times on YouTube which, according to Nick Romeo in the book "Driven: Six Incredible Musical Journeys," makes Anderson & Roe "one of the most popular piano duos in the world."

Jay Wilson blogs, Anderson & Roe's music videos "explore the narrative suggested by the music they play, [and they] allow the viewer access to the physical element of piano duetting."

== Discography ==
=== Solo ===
- "Bach & Rachmaninoff" (2014)
- "On Wings of Song" (2006)

=== Duo ===
- "Mother: A Musical Tribute" (2018)
- "Rite of Spring" (2016)
- "The Art of Bach" (2015)
- "An Amadeus Affair" (2014)
- "When Words Fade" (2011)
- "Reimagine" (2008)

=== Other ===
- Anderson G and Kaplan D (2007). "Interior Landscapes I & II" [Audio CD]. Connecticut, USA. Laderman; Bagatelles, op 33 / Beethoven; Concerto op 3 no 9 BWV 972 / [Vivaldi]; arr. Bach; Sarabande / Lully; Menuet in A minor / Rameau.
- A live performance by the Anderson & Roe Piano Duo is featured on the "Sounds of Juilliard" CD celebrating the school's centennial.

== Media Appearances ==
- MTV's Total Request Live in a Harry Potter competition (May 24, 2004)
- WQXR Radio
- WGBH Radio Live Performance on Oct 7, 2010
- NPR’s All Things Considered
- NPR's From the Top
- APM’s Performance Today
- PBS’ Texas Music Cafe
- BBC’s In Tune

== Compositions ==
=== Solo piano ===
- Mathilde, Marieke, et Madeline (2010)
- Variation on "March of the Puritans" from Bellini's I puritani (2009)
- Piano Variations (2004)
- Etude No. 1: "Asimov vs. Huxley" (2003)
- life is more true than reason will deceive (2002)
- Piano Fantasy in D minor (1998)

=== Two piano ===
- Arne: "The Glitt'ring Sun" from The Morning (2010)
- Schumann: "Mondnacht" from Liederkreis, Op. 39 (2010)
- Carmen Fantasy (based on Bizet's Carmen) (2010)
- Mozart: "Soave sia il vento" from Cosi fan tutte (2010)
- Radiohead: "Paranoid Android" (2009)
- Bach: "Aus Liebe will mein Heiland Sterben" from St. Matthew's Passion (2009)
- Saint-Saëns: The Swan (2007)
- Danse macabre: remix (based on music by Saint-Saëns) (2007)
- Schubert: "The Crow" from Winterreise (2007)
- Daquin: The Cuckoo in Sussex (2007)
- Turtle "Stayin' Alive" (based on music by the Bee Gees) (2007)
- The Cat's Fugue (based on a fugue subject by Scarlatti) (2007)
- Williams: Star Wars Fantasy: Four Impressions for two pianos (2006)
- Bach: "Erbarme Dich" from St. Matthew's Passion (2005)

=== Piano Four Hands ===
- Stölzel/Bach: "Bist du bei mir," arranged for piano, four-hands AND simple treble melody (voice, violin, clarinet, etc.). E-flat major. Low melody pitch: E-flat above middle C. High melody pitch: two A-flats above middle C. (2010)
- Jackson: "Billie Jean" (2010)
- Gluck: "Ballet" from Orfeo ed Euridice (also known as "Melody") (2010)
- Kreisler: Tambourin Chinois (2009)
- Mozart: "Grand Scherzo," based on the Finale to Act I of Cosi fan tutte (2009)
- Rachmaninoff: "Vocalise" (2009)
- Fantasy on The Last Rose of Summer (2008)
- "Irish Tune from County Derry", arranged for piano, four-hands from the Grainger version for solo piano (2008)
- Debussy: Clair de lune (arranged for piano, six-hands) (2007)
- Khachaturian: Sabre Dance (2006)
- Dukas: The Sorcerer's Apprentice (2005)
- Piazzolla: Libertango (2004)
- "A New Account of the Blue Danube Waltzes" (2004)

=== Piano Ensemble ===
- Three Waltzes for Five Browns: Disney Waltz Medley, for five pianos (2009)
- "Over the Rainbow: Fantasy for Five Pianos" (based on tunes from The Wizard of Oz by Harold Arlen) (2009)
- John Williams: "Star Wars: Suite for Five Pianos," arranged for five pianos (2009)
- Dario Marianelli: "Atonement," arranged for five pianos (2009)
- "Happy Times," a traditional Chinese folk song, arranged for five pianos (2008)
- Mozart: "Rondo alla turca," arranged for five pianos (2008)
- "Ragtime alla turca" for five pianos, based on Mozart's Rondo alla turca (2008)
- "Dance Macabre: Hootenanny for Five Pianos" based on Saint-Saëns' Danse Macabre (2008)
- Holst: "The Planets: Suite for Five Pianos" – I. Mars, The Bringer of War; II. Neptune, The Mystic; III. Jupiter, The Bringer of Jollity. (2008)
- Debussy: Clair de lune (arranged for piano, six-hands) (2007)
- "Everybody Loves Somebody" arranged for 5 pianos and voice (2007)
- Rachmaninoff: "18th Variation" from Rhapsody on a Theme by Paganini, arranged for five pianos (2006)
- Fantasia on "Dives and Lazarus," for five pianos (2006)
- Anderson: "Sleigh Ride: A Holiday Excursion for Five Pianos" (2006)
- "The Star-Spangled Banner, and then some," for five pianos (2006)

=== Other ===
- Stölzel/Bach: "Bist du bei mir," arranged for piano, four-hands AND simple treble melody (voice, violin, clarinet, etc.). E-flat major. Low melody pitch: E-flat above middle C. High melody pitch: two A-flats above middle C. (2010)
- Piazzolla: Oblivion, arranged for Euphonium and Piano (2008)
- Saint-Saëns: Danse Macabre Bacchanale for two pianos, two percussionists and violin (2002)
- "Life is more true than reason will deceive" for Soprano and Piano (2002)
- Sarabande for Violin and Piano (2001)
- French Overture for String Orchestra (1997)
