= Thorwald Jørgensen =

Dutch classical musician (born 1980)

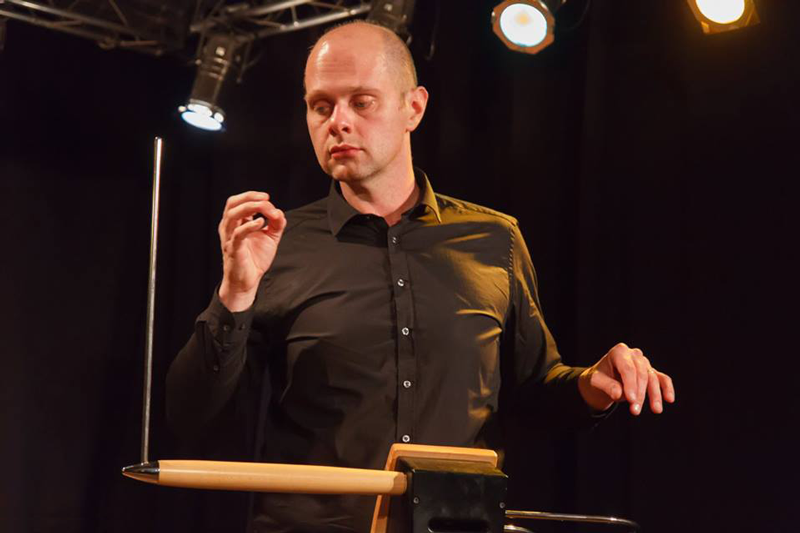

Background information
- Born: Zaltbommel, Netherlands
- Genres: Classical, Electronic
- Instrument: Theremin
- Website: www.thorwaldjorgensen.com

Thorwald Jørgensen (born 1980) is a Dutch classical musician who specialises in the theremin, an electronic musical instrument.

== Biography ==
Jørgensen was born in Zaltbommel. He took up playing percussion instruments at age 14 and began playing in orchestras. He took up classical music as a career full-time after graduating from the Utrecht and Tilburg Conservatory. He became influenced by the theremin after hearing the work of Clara Rockmore and began researching the instrument's history and teaching himself how to play one. As well as watching old videos of Rockmore, he consulted a friend who played the cello for musical advice. He has subsequently played over 100 concerts using the theremin, including in Saint Petersburg and a tour of the United States.

In 2014, Jørgensen performed at the Music and Beyond festival in Ottawa, performing Daniel Mehdizadeh's "The Awakening of Baron Samedi". Together with Dutch harp player Renske de Leuw, Thorwald premiered "Sirenum scopuli" by Canadian composer Victor Herbiet at the X Rio Harp Festival in Rio de Janeiro, Brazil in 2015. In 2023, Thorwald premiered "Cinq moments dans la vie trépidante de Léon Théremine", a theremin concerto by Canadian composer Simon Bertrand with the Orchestre Métropolitain conducted by Daniela Candillari.

Jørgensen has been described as "one of the most important exponents of classical music on the theremin". In interviews, he has said he considers the theremin capable of being a serious instrument, rather than the novelty it is normally perceived as. He believes he can reproduce all the sounds in a typical classical string section from double bass to violin. He has assembled a library of theremin music from stock libraries in both the Netherlands and worldwide, and has lectured on composition at the Conservatory of Amsterdam and Rotterdam Conservatory.

Outside of classical music, Jørgensen has also played theremin on the Dutch progressive metal band Satinoxide's album "Still in the Sun".
