= Brakel, Gelderland =

Brakel
- Village
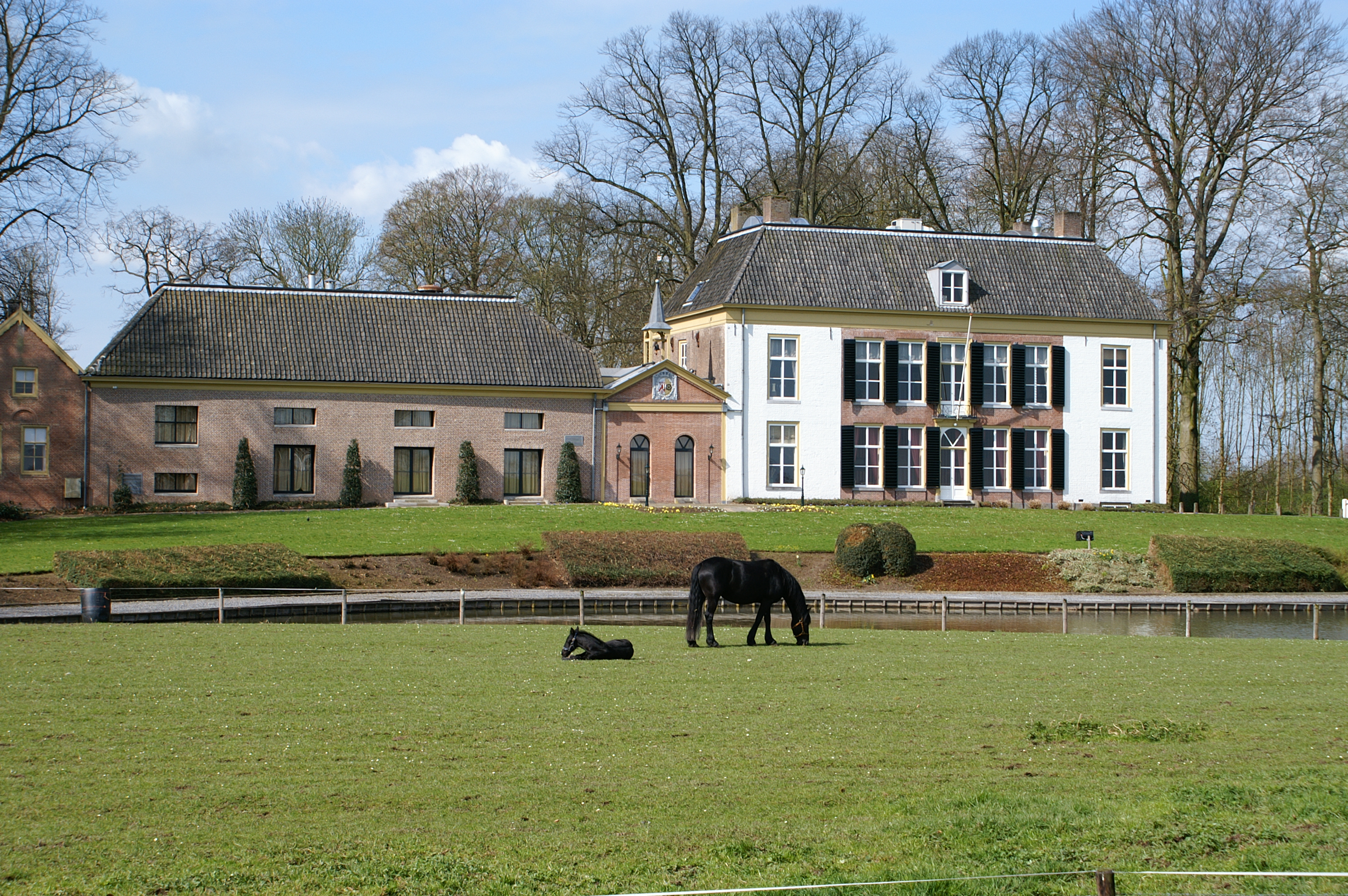
- Huis te Brakel

- Flag Coat of arms

- Location in the Netherlands Brakel (Netherlands)
- Coordinates: 51°49′N 5°5′E
- Country: Netherlands
- Province: Gelderland
- Municipality: Zaltbommel

Area
  - Total: 10.40 km^{2} (4.02 sq mi)
- Elevation: 5 m (16 ft)

Population (2021)
  - Total: 3,050
  - Density: 293/km^{2} (760/sq mi)
- Time zone: UTC+1 (CET)
  - Summer (DST): UTC+2 (CEST)
- Postal code: 5306
- Dialing code: 0418

Brakel is a village in the Dutch province of Gelderland. Since 1999, it is a part of the municipality of Zaltbommel, about eight kilometres east of Gorinchem.

== History ==
Brakel was first mentioned in 1212. The etymology is unclear. It developed into an irregular esdorp, then a linear dike village. The Protestant church dates from the 15th century and has 14th-century elements. The tower was severely damaged in 1944 and restored in 1950.

Slot Brakel was a castle from the 13th century, destroyed in 1672 by the French. In 1768, Huis te Brakel was built on the grounds, where the centre still contains the ruins of the medieval castle as part of a garden. In 1840, the village held 1,096 people.

== Gallery ==
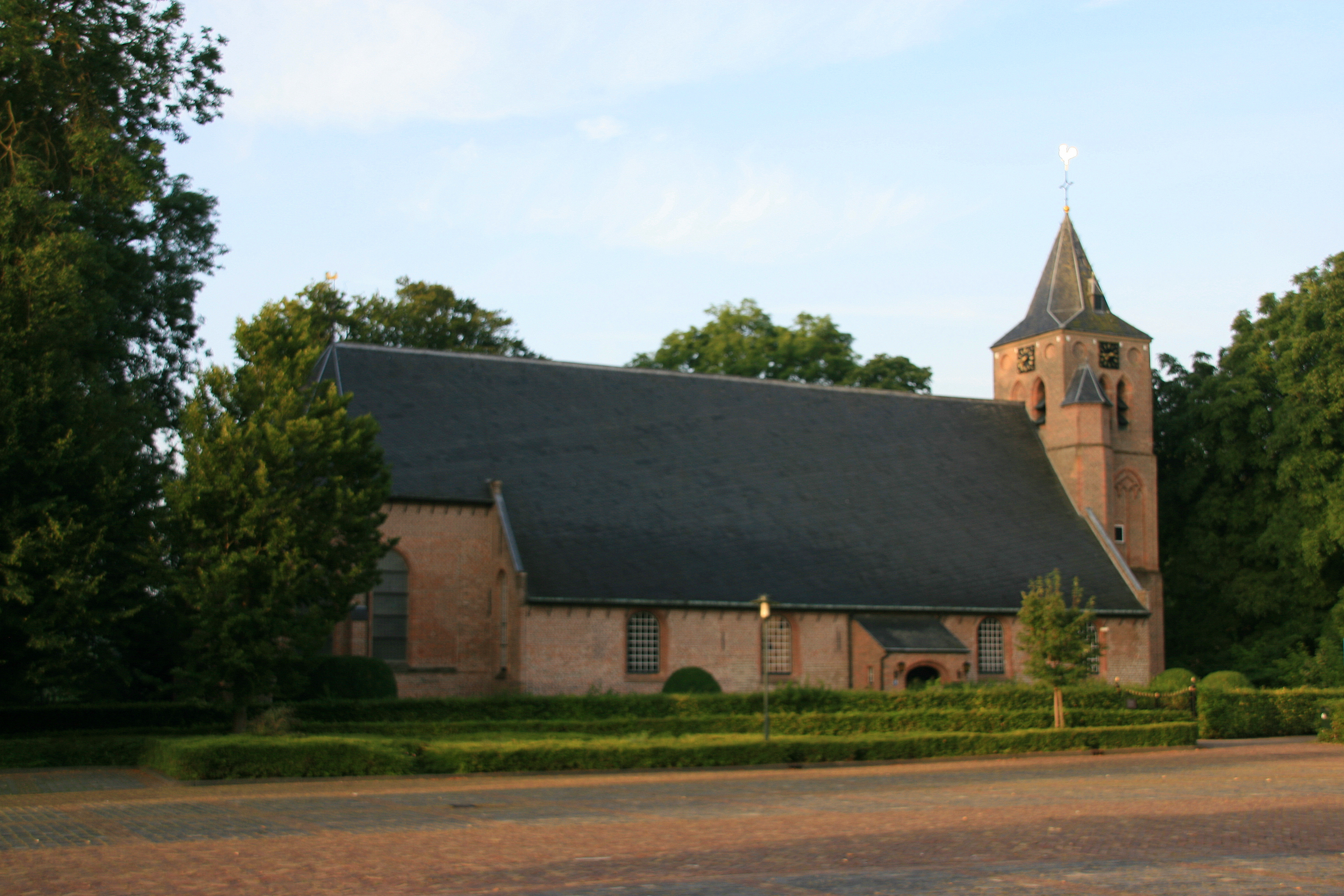
Protestant church

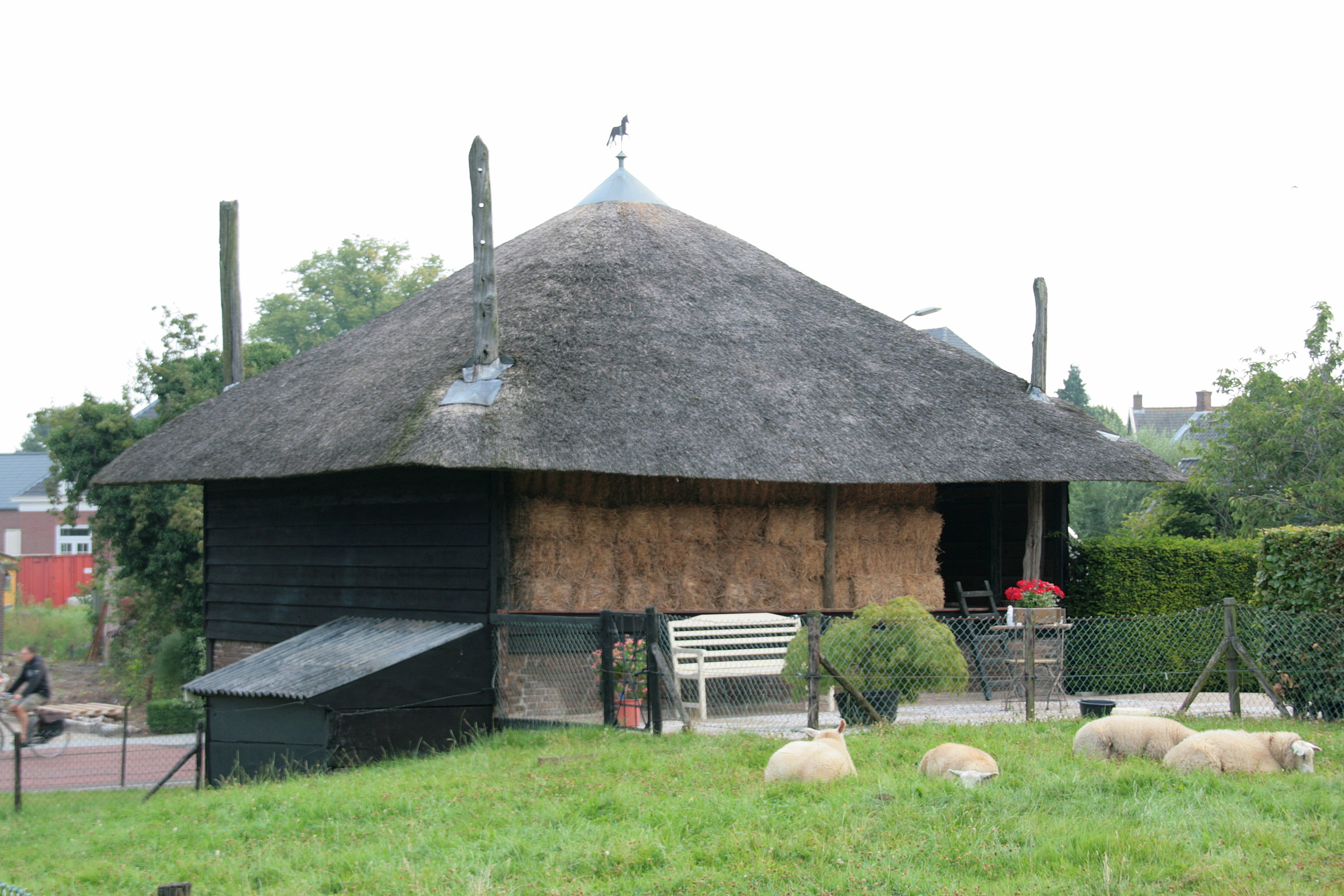
Haystack

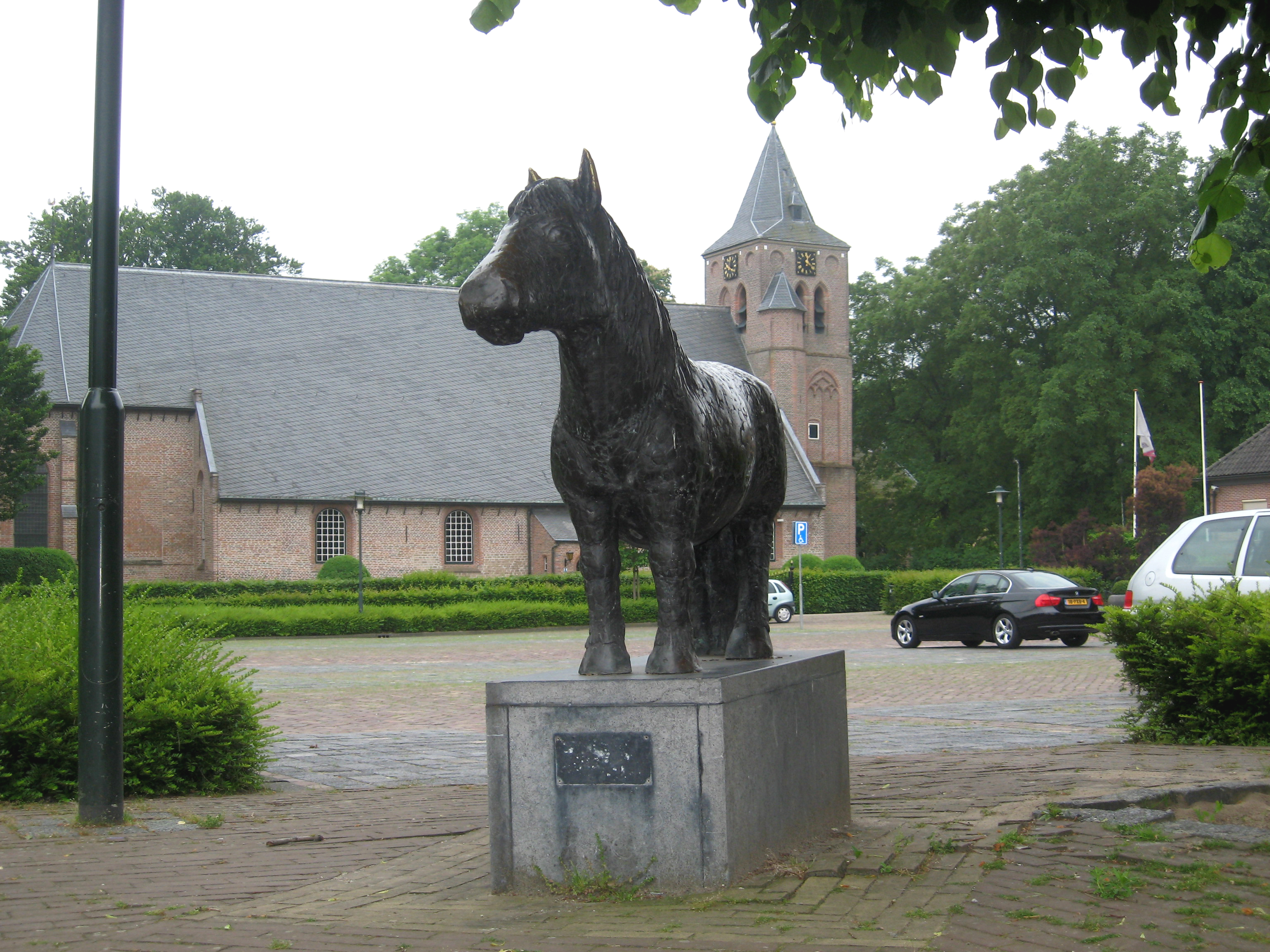
Pony statue

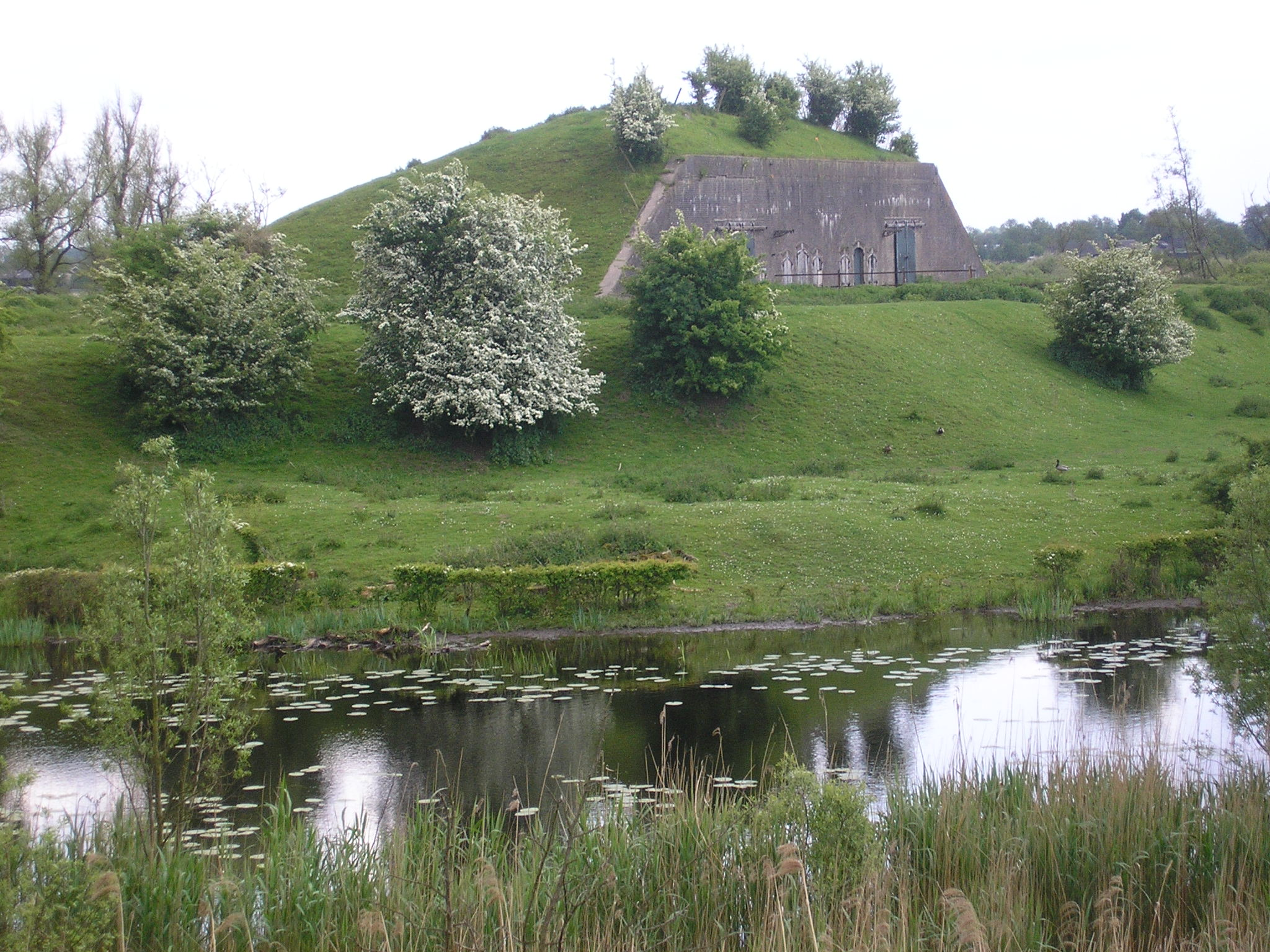
Former artillery battery
