= Maurik =

Town in Gelderland, Netherlands

- Town
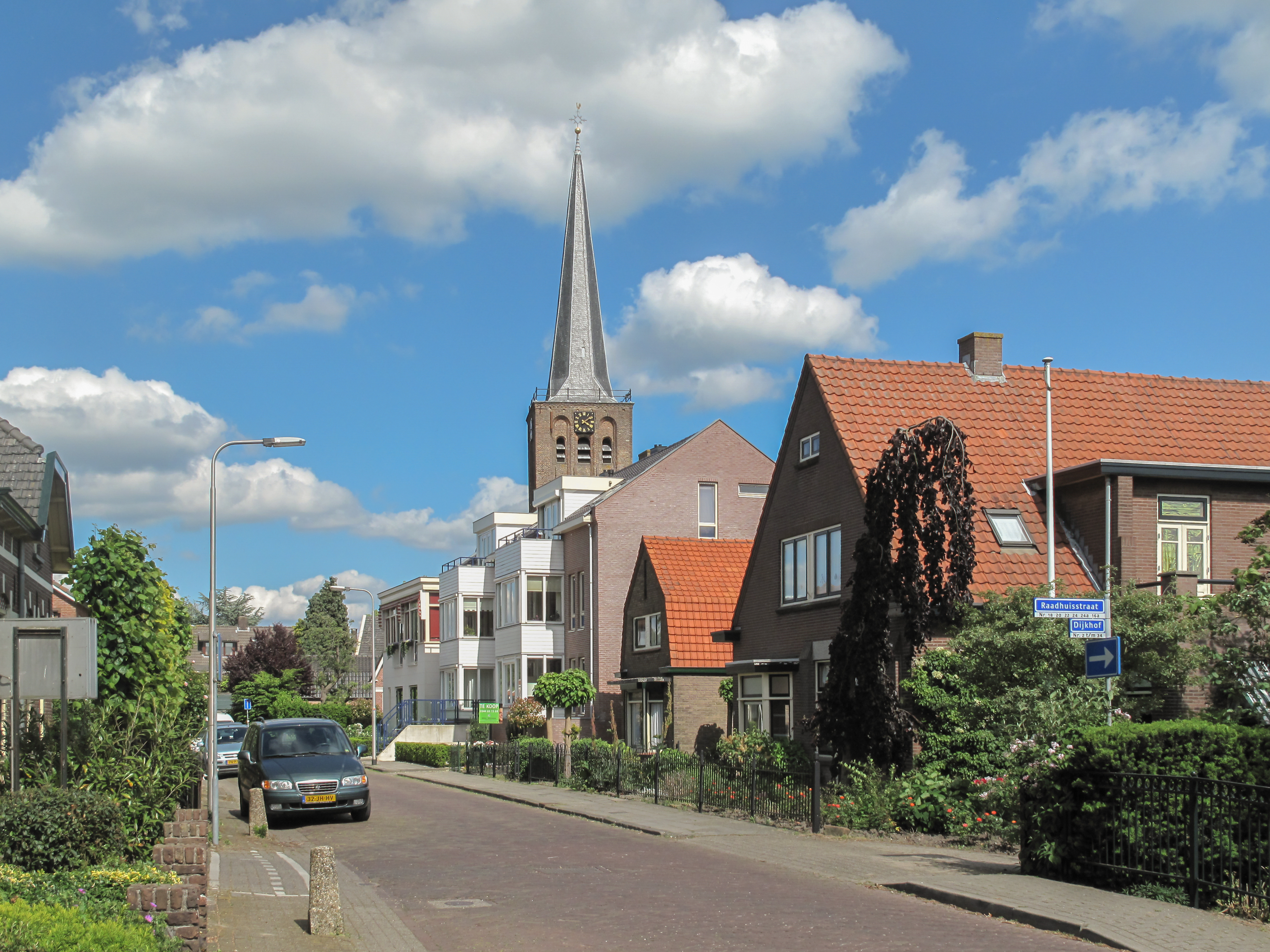
- Street view with church

- Flag Coat of arms

- Location in the province of Gelderland Location in the Netherlands
- Coordinates: 51°57′36″N 5°25′25″E
- Country: Netherlands
- Province: Gelderland
- Municipality: Buren

Area
  - Total: 17.54 km^{2} (6.77 sq mi)
- Elevation: 5.2 m (17 ft)

Population (2022)
  - Total: 5,078
  - Density: 289.5/km^{2} (749.8/sq mi)
- Time zone: UTC+1 (CET)
  - Summer (DST): UTC+2 (CEST)
- Postal code: 4021
- Dialing code: 0344

Maurik is a town in the Dutch province of Gelderland. It is a part of the municipality of Buren, and lies about 8 km north of Tiel.

== History ==
The village was first mentioned around 300 as Mannaricio, and since 997 as Maldericke. The etymology is unclear, and the relation between the oldest form which is possibly Celtic and the current name is also in doubt. Maurik developed in the Early Middle Ages along the Nederrijn.

The Dutch Reformed church is a three aisled basilica-like church with a needle spire. The lower part of the tower dates from the 14th century, the upper part was added during the 16th century. The church dates from the 15th century, and has been restored between 1920 and 1925.

Maurik was home to 1,370 people in 1840. Maurik was a separate municipality until 1999, when it was merged with Buren.

The Eiland van Maurik (Island of Maurik) is a recreational area on a peninsula in the flood plains of the Nederrijn. It contains camp sites and holiday homes.

== Gallery ==
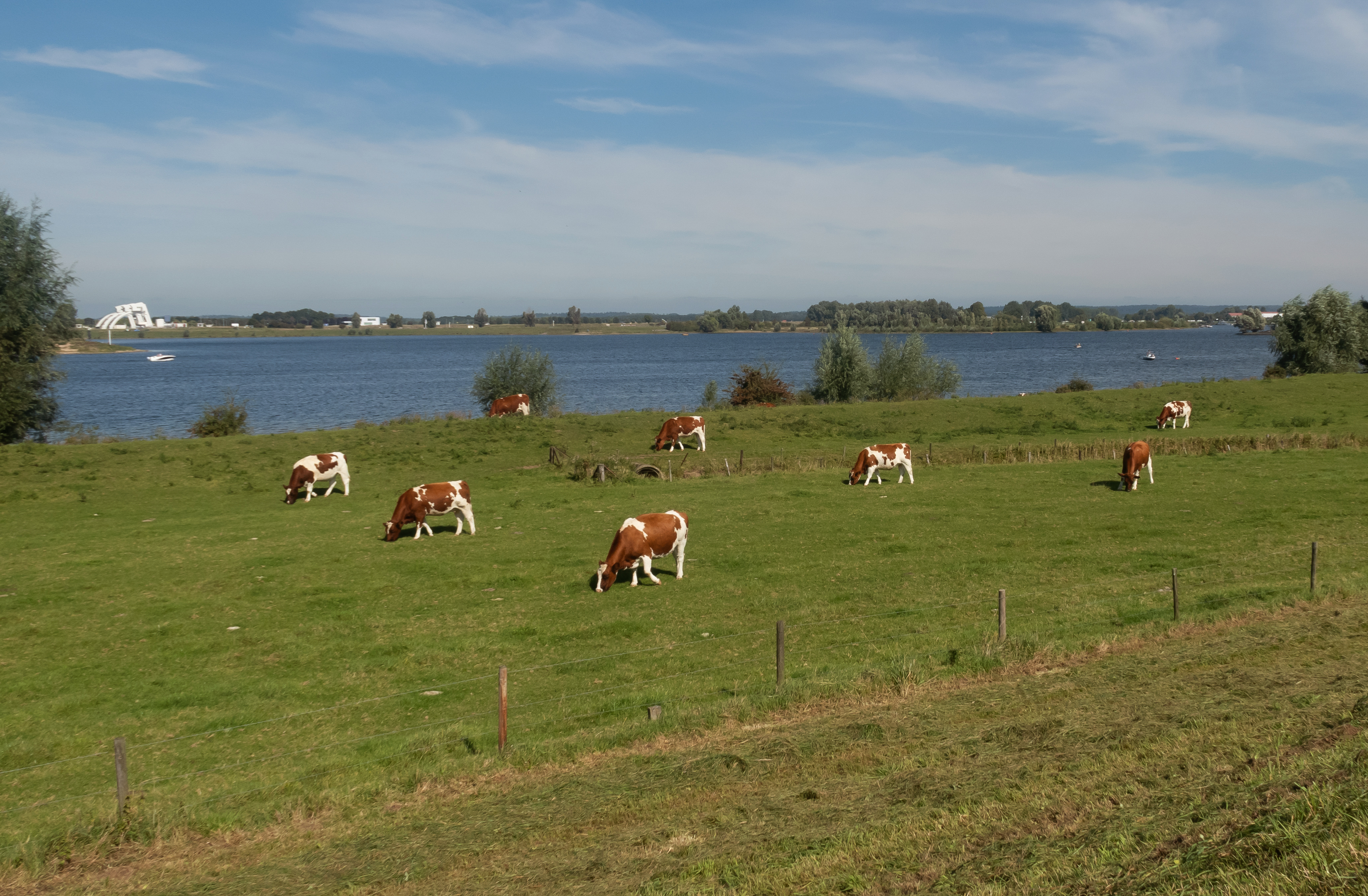
near Eiland van Maurik, panorama with cows

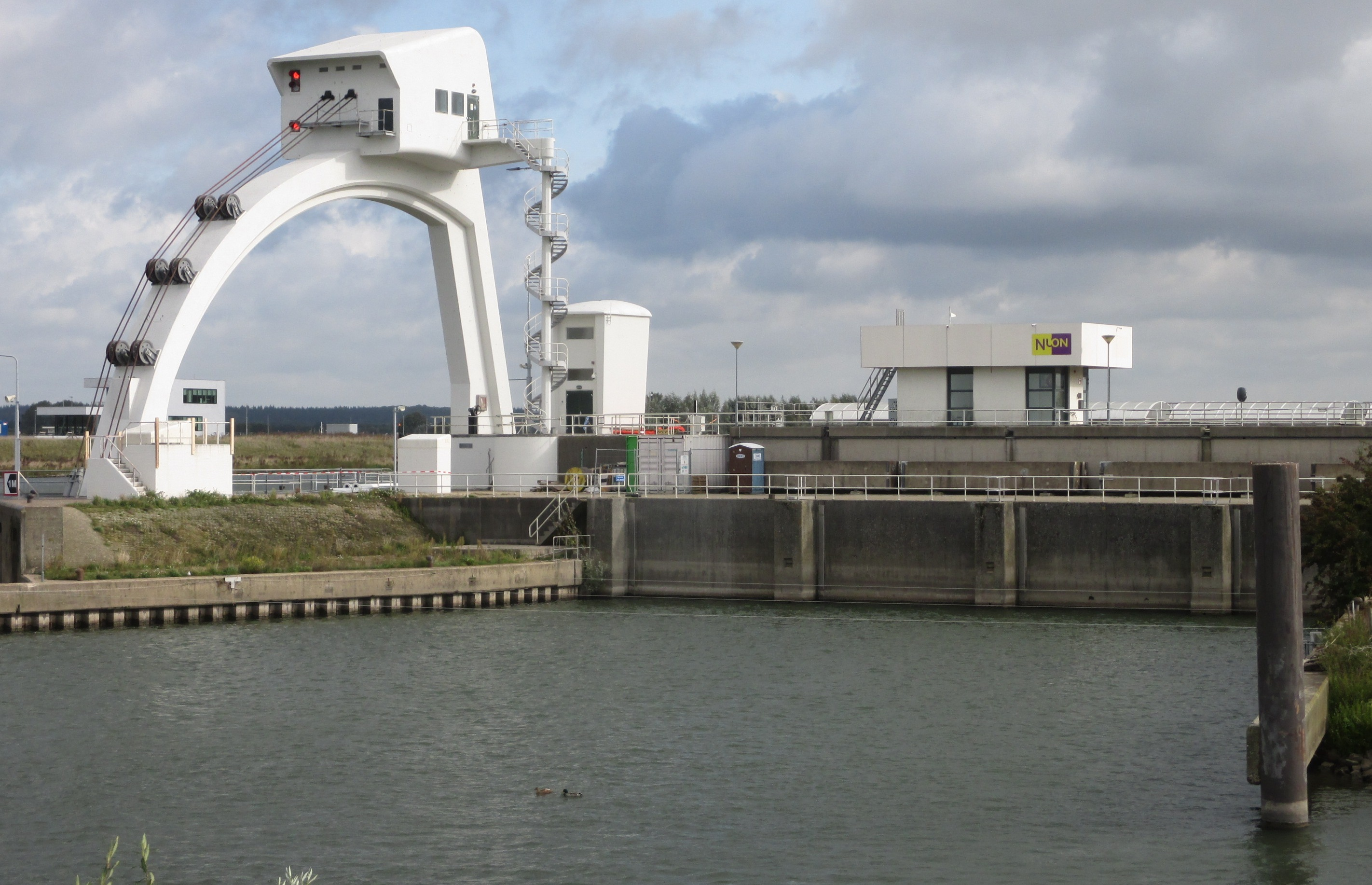
Hydroelectric plant

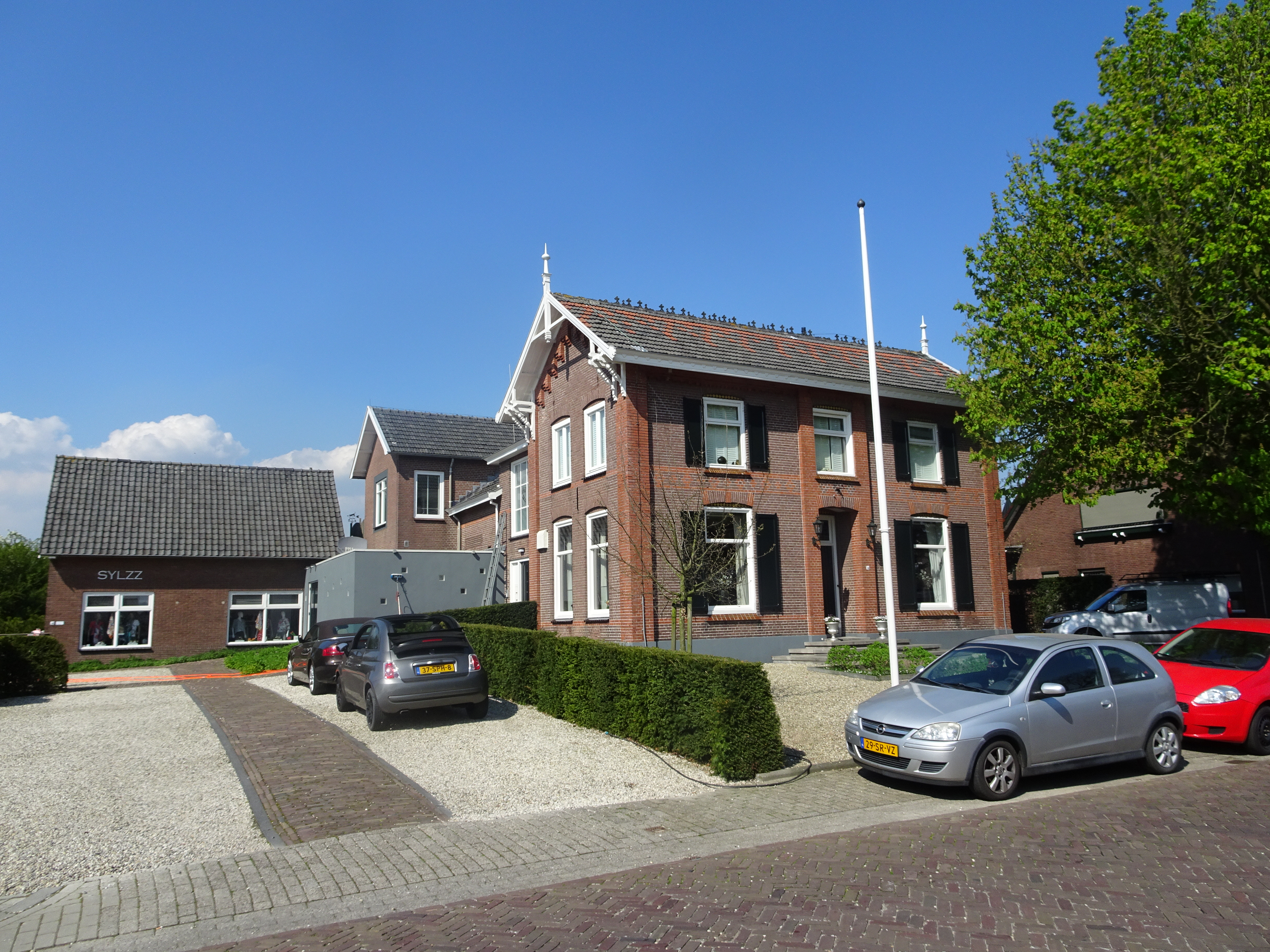
Former town hall

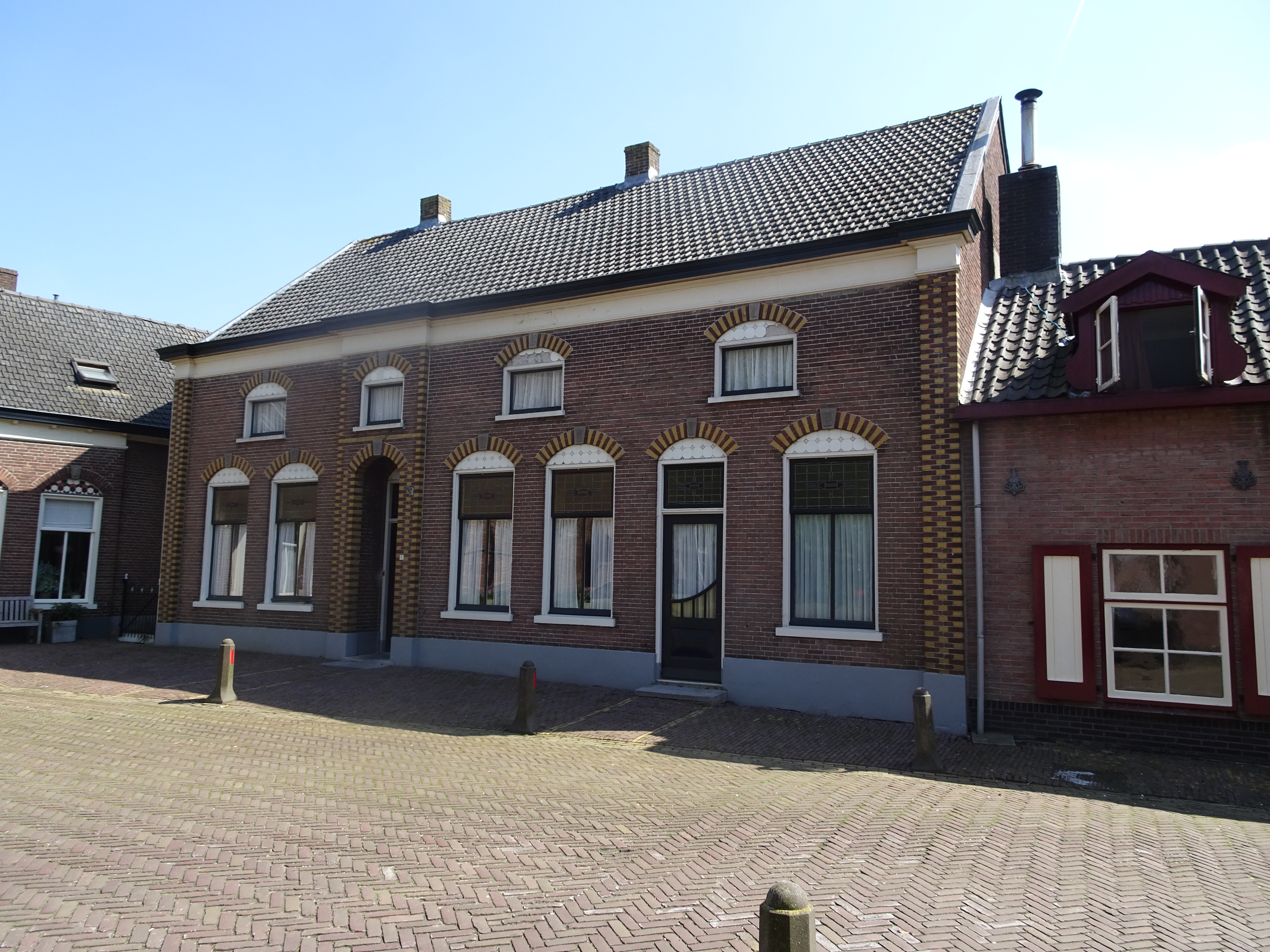
Building in Maurik
