= Zaltbommel =

Zaltbommel Bommel
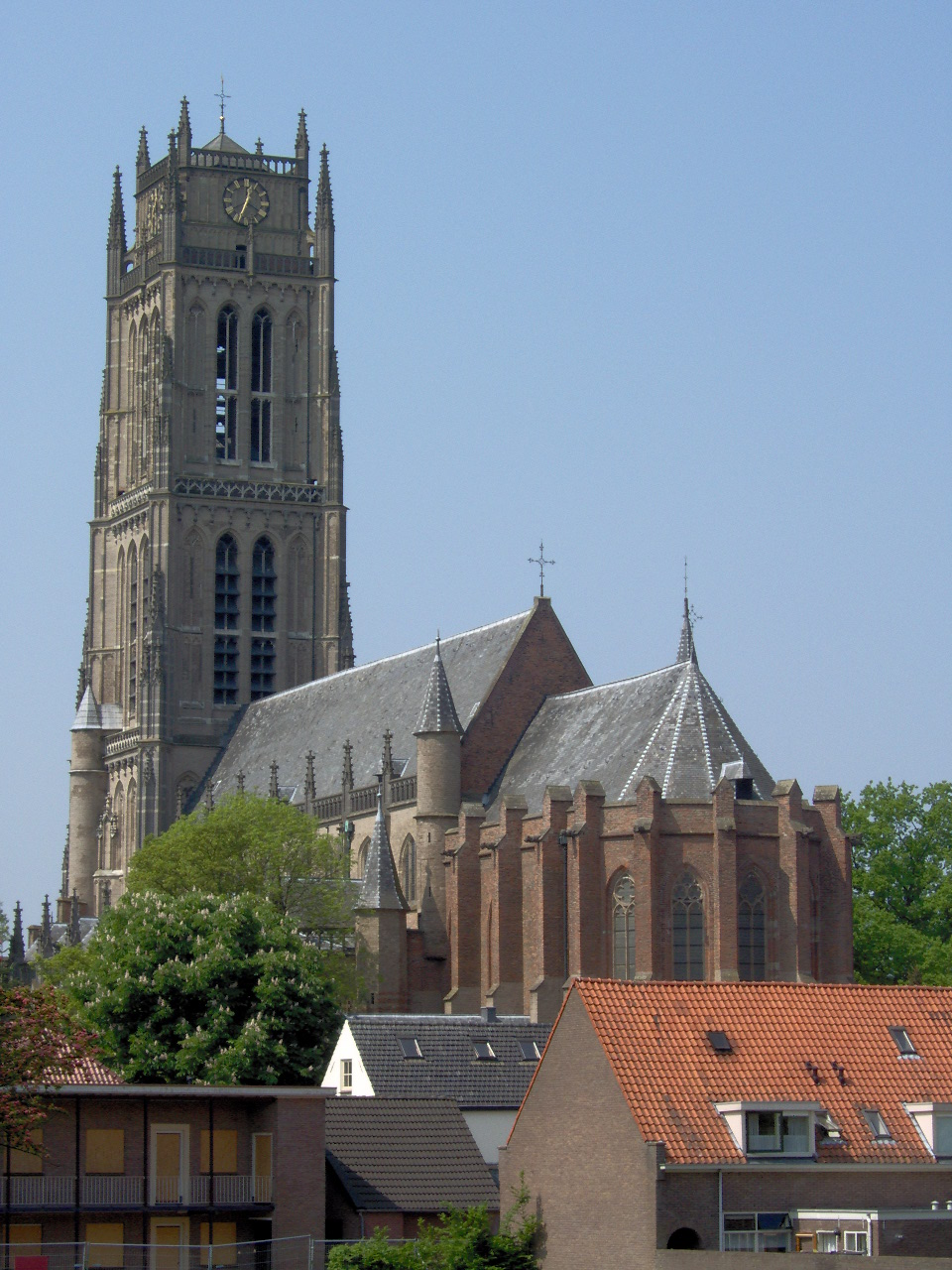
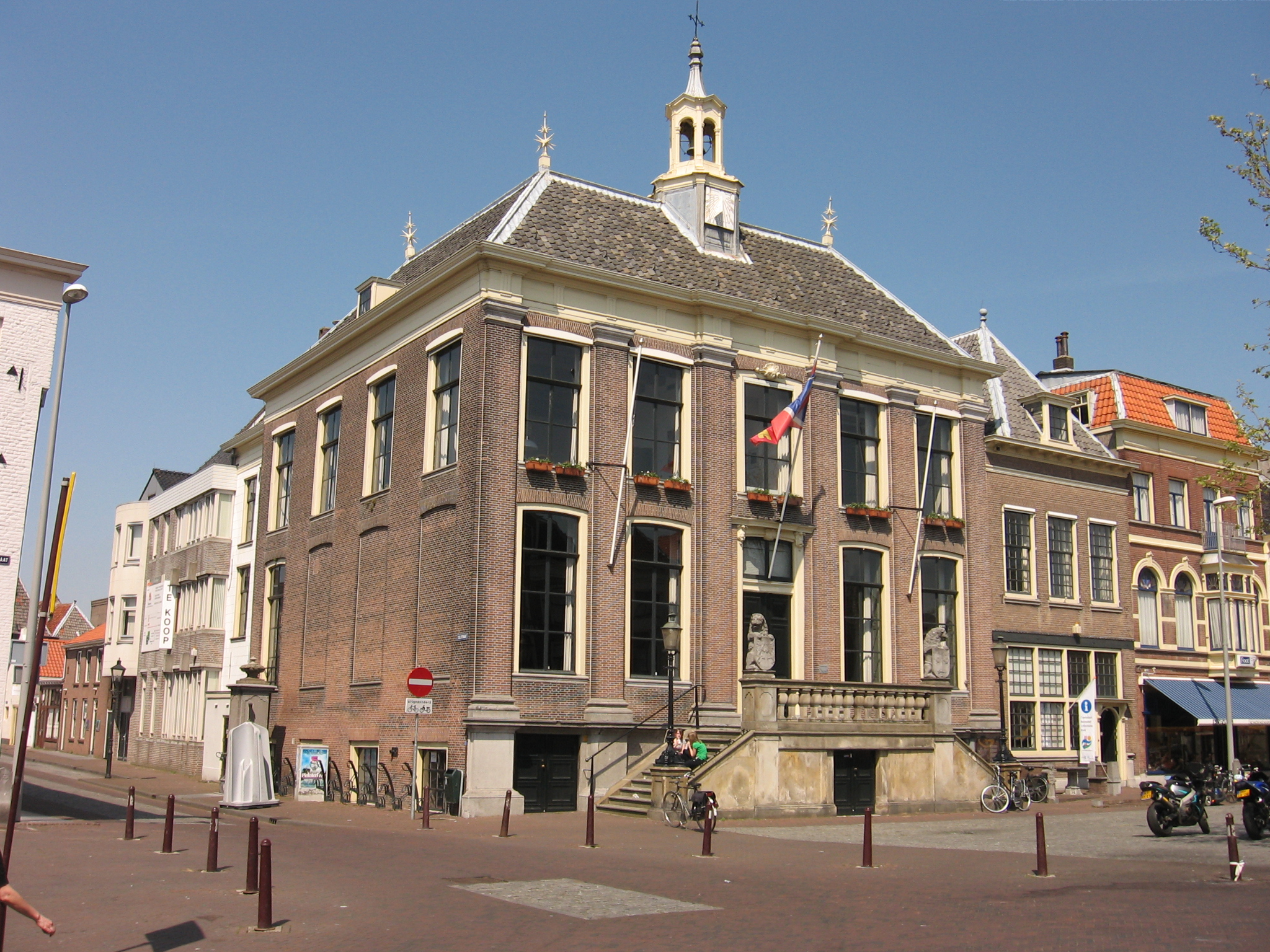
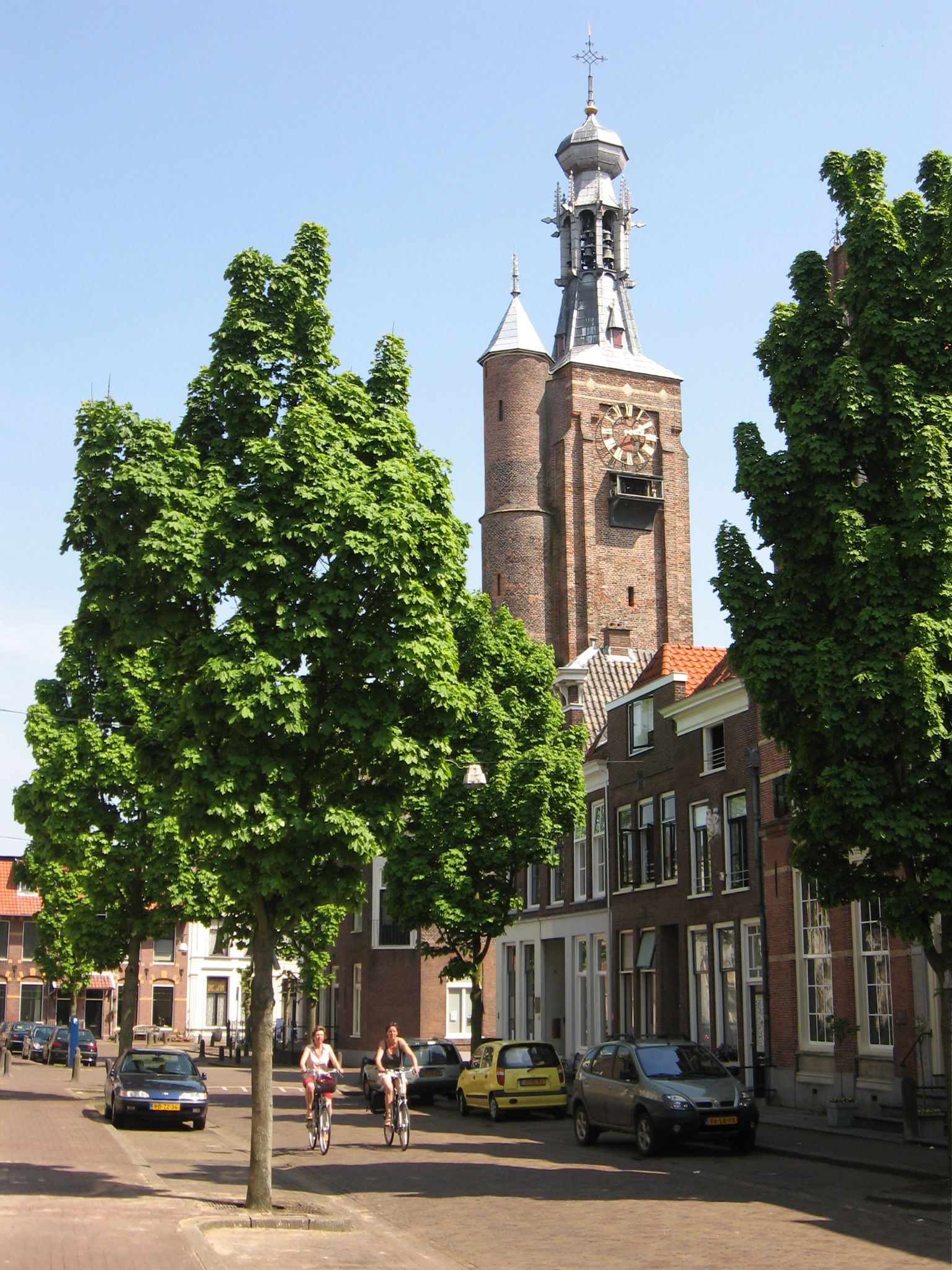
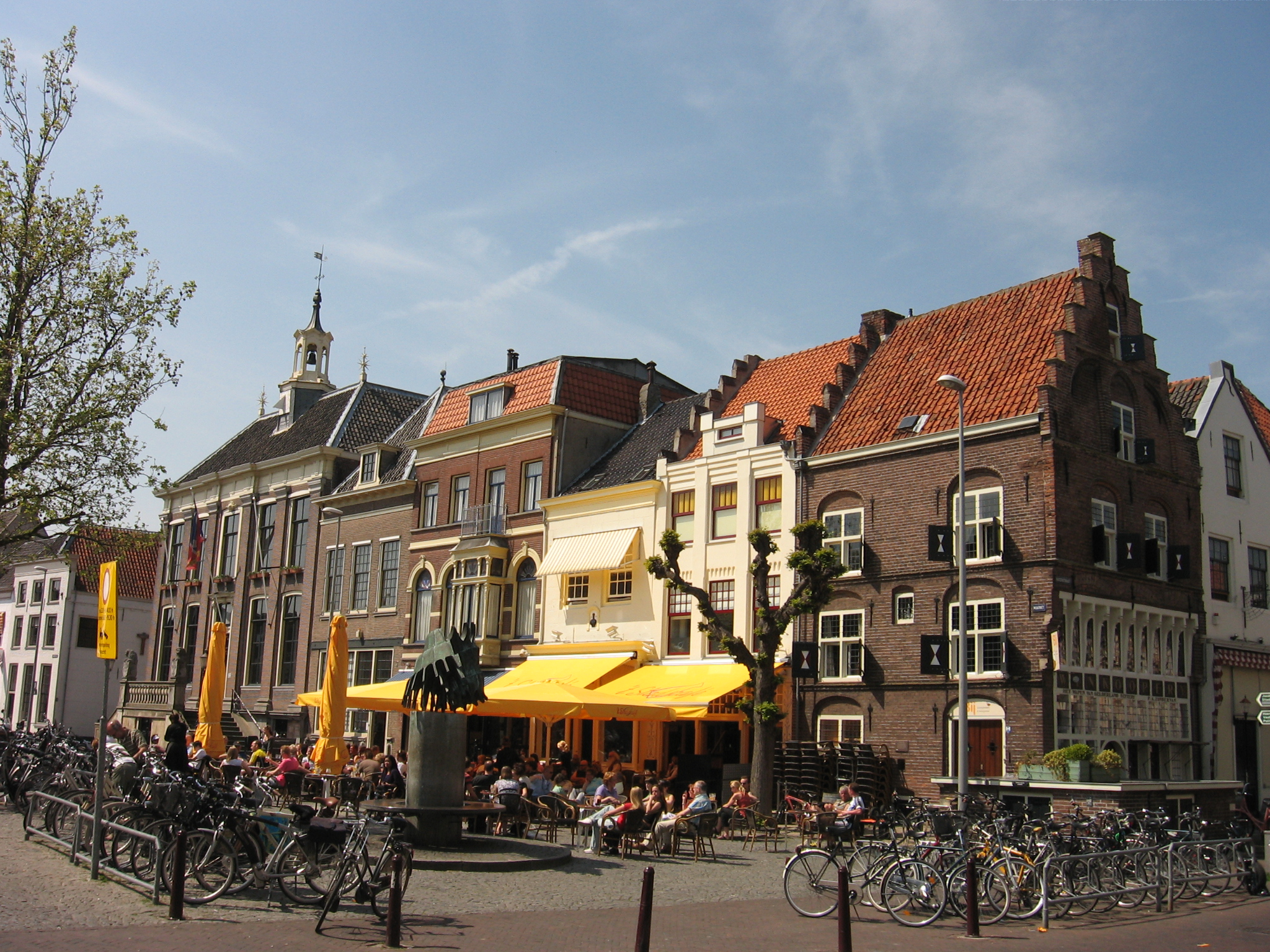
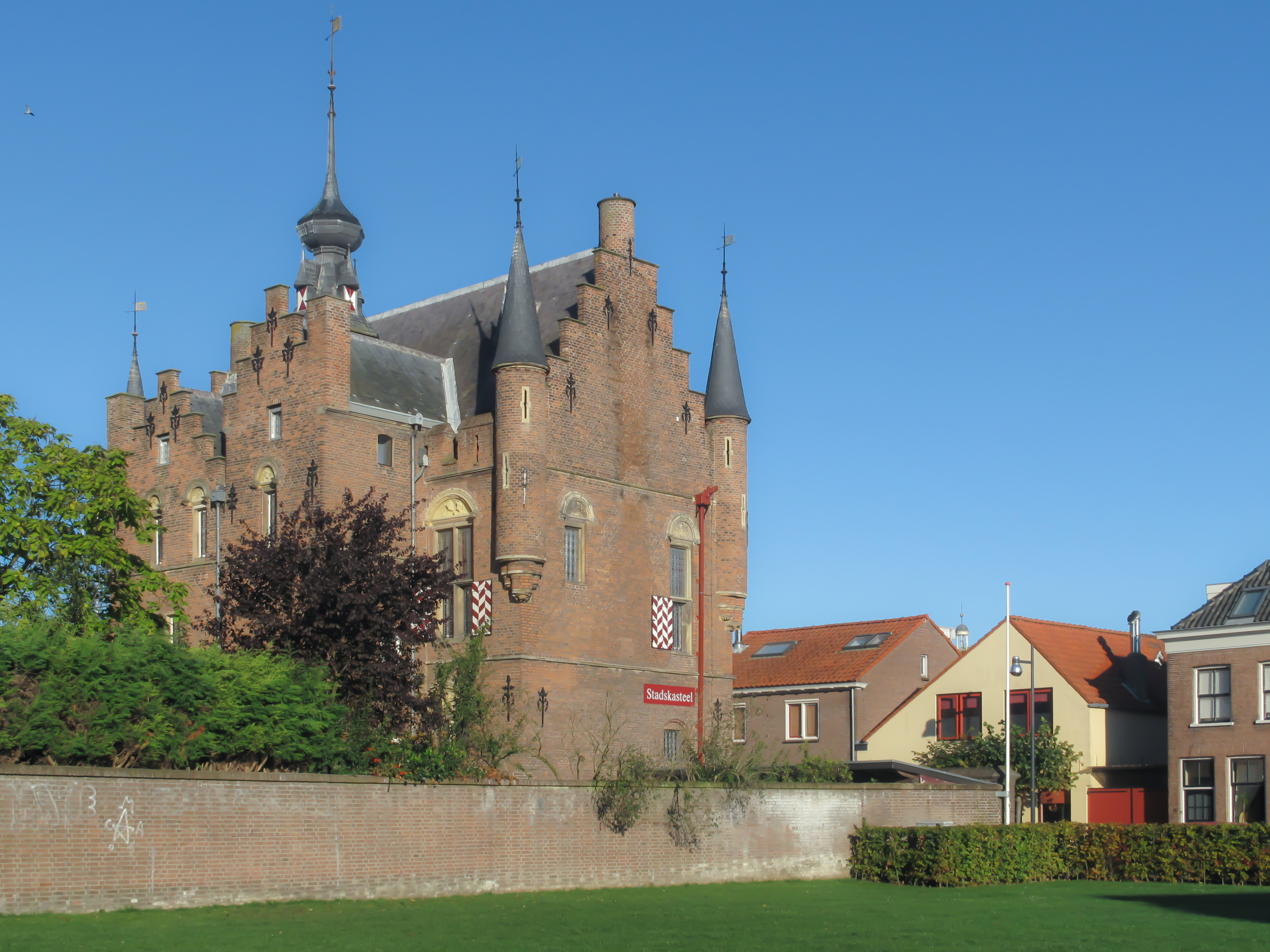
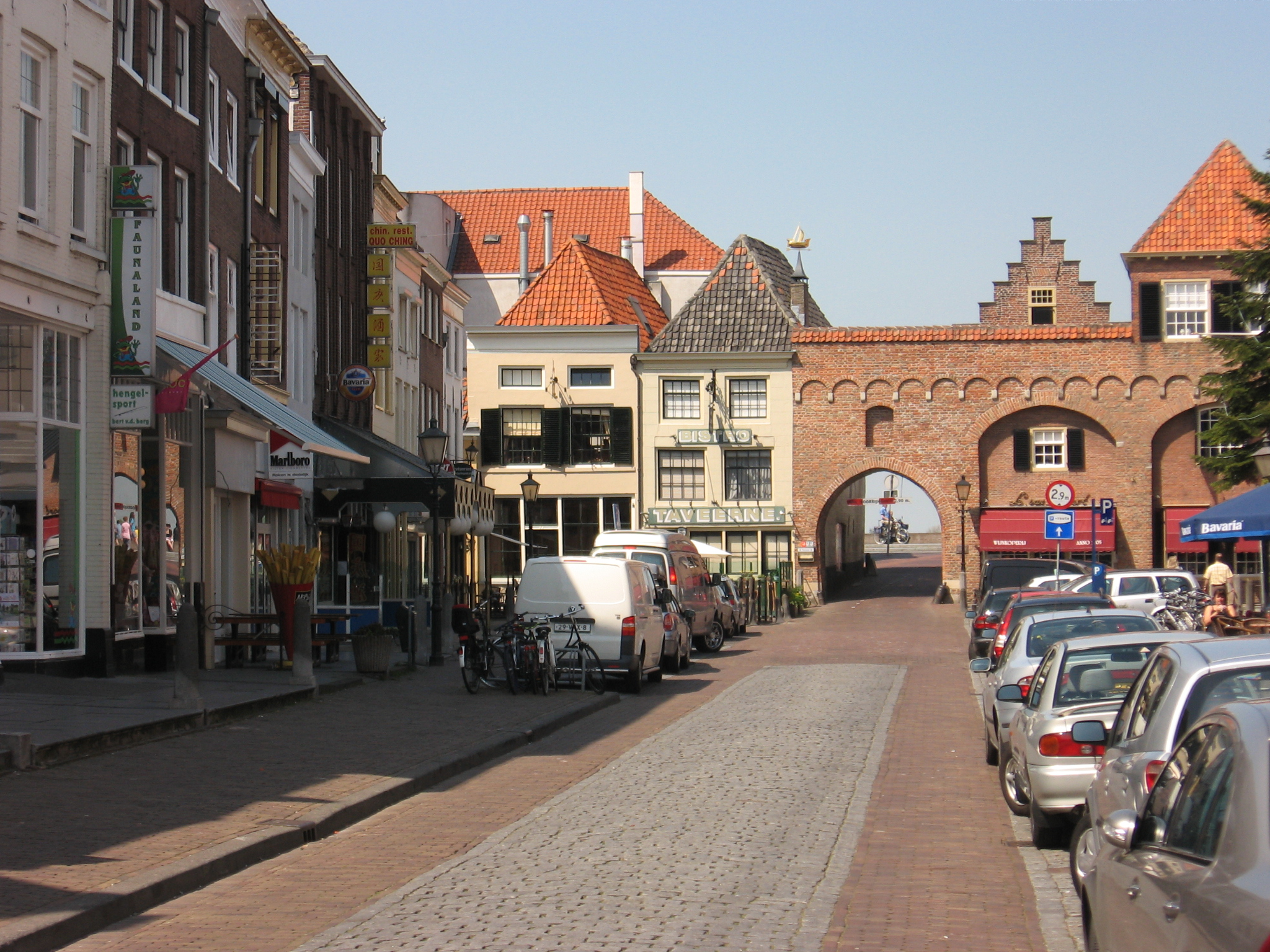
- Saint Martin church City hall Gasthuis Tower Market Maarten van Rossum museum Water gate

- Flag Coat of arms

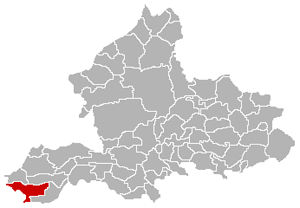
- Location of the municipality within Gelderland

- Location within the Netherlands Location within Europe
- Coordinates: 51°48′N 5°15′E
- Country: Netherlands
- Province: Gelderland

Government
  - Body: Municipal council
  - Mayor: Peter Rehwinkel (acting) (PvdA)

Area
  - Total: 89.04 km^{2} (34.38 sq mi)
  - Land: 79.38 km^{2} (30.65 sq mi)
  - Water: 9.66 km^{2} (3.73 sq mi)
- Elevation: 3 m (9.8 ft)

Population (January 2021)
  - Total: 29,447
  - Density: 371/km^{2} (960/sq mi)
- Time zone: UTC+1 (CET)
  - Summer (DST): UTC+2 (CEST)
- Postcode: 5300–5311, 5315–5318
- Area code: 0418
- Website: www.zaltbommel.nl

Zaltbommel (Dutch pronunciation: [zɑldˈbɔməl]), also known, historically and colloquially, as Bommel, is a municipality and a city in the Netherlands.

== History ==
=== The city of Zaltbommel ===
The town of Zaltbommel was first mentioned as "Bomela" in the year 850. Zaltbommel received city rights in 1231 and these were renewed in 1316. In 1599 during the Eighty Years War, Zaltbommel was besieged by Spanish forces but was relieved by an Anglo-Dutch force led by Maurice of Orange. The bridge over the Waal at Zaltbommel (which has since been replaced) features in a celebrated twentieth-century Dutch sonnet, De moeder de vrouw, by Martinus Nijhoff.

Zaltbommel was expanded to its current size on 1 January 1999, by a merger of the municipalities of Brakel, Kerkwijk and Zaltbommel. The municipality is situated in the heart of the Netherlands, close to the A2 Motorway, the railway line from Utrecht to 's‑Hertogenbosch and the rivers Waal and Maas.

== Topography ==
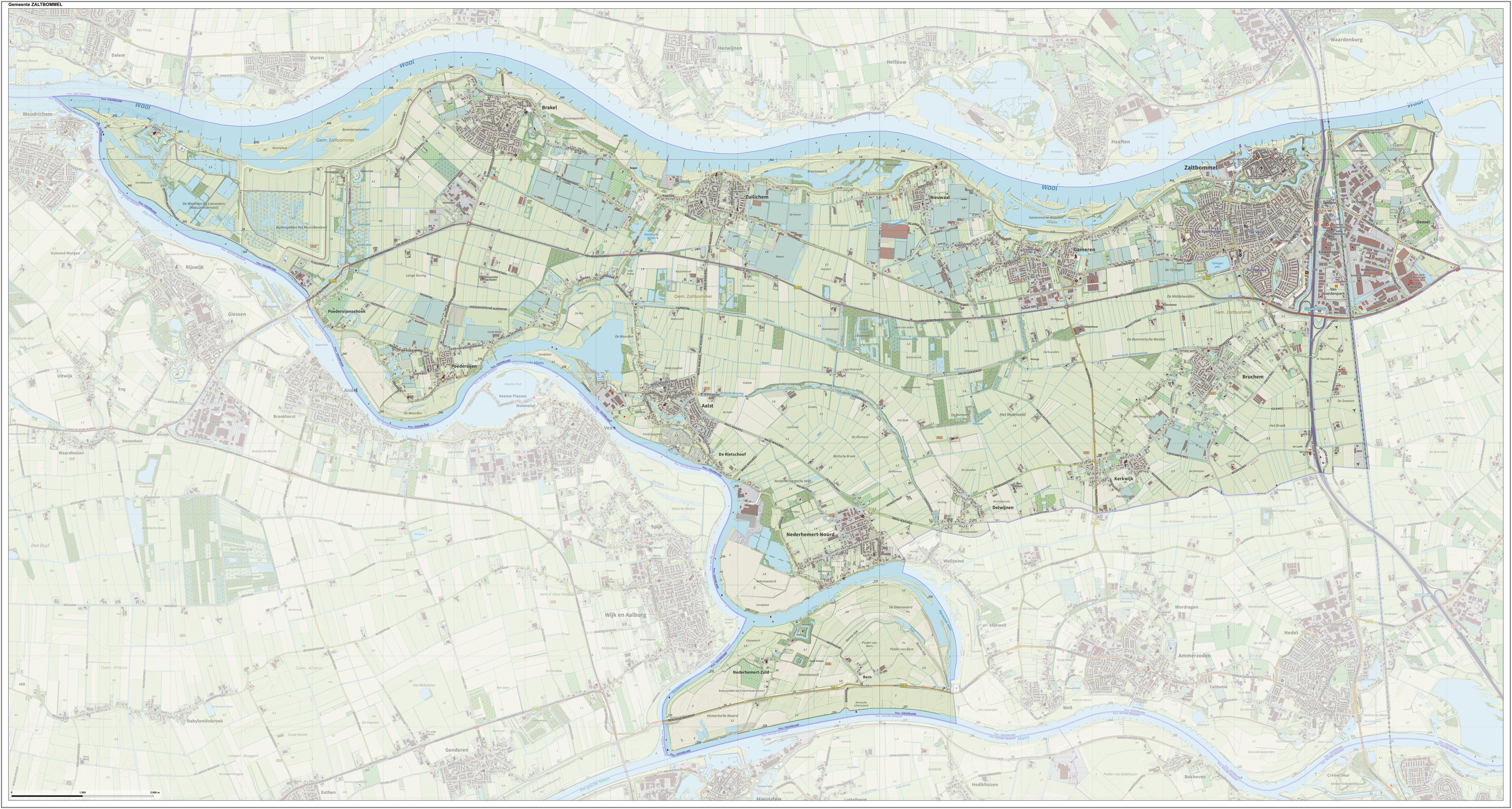

Dutch Topographic map of Zaltbommel (municipality), Sept. 2014

== Population centres ==
The municipality, consists of 13 population centres and had a population of 29,447 in 2021.

Name	Population (1-1-2015)	Population (1-1-2016)
Aalst	2102	2106
Bern	36	33
Brakel	3050	3066
Bruchem	1674	1668
Delwijnen	341	337
Gameren	2433	2466
Kerkwijk	629	640
Nederhemert	1612	1604
Nieuwaal	732	758
Poederoijen	1013	1039
Zaltbommel	12040	12143
Zuilichem	1704	1702
Total	27366	27562

== Notable residents ==
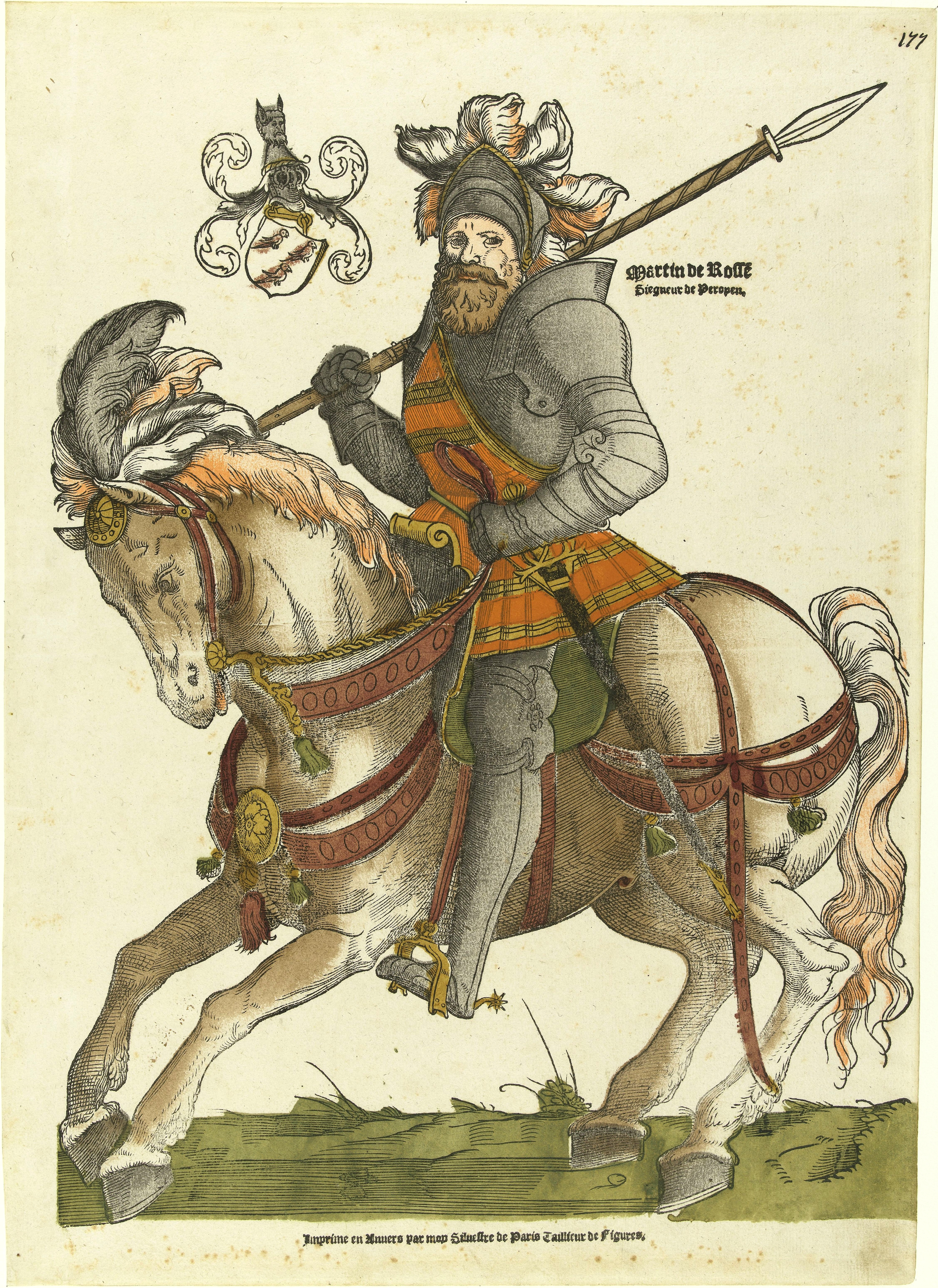
Maarten van Rossum, pre-1542

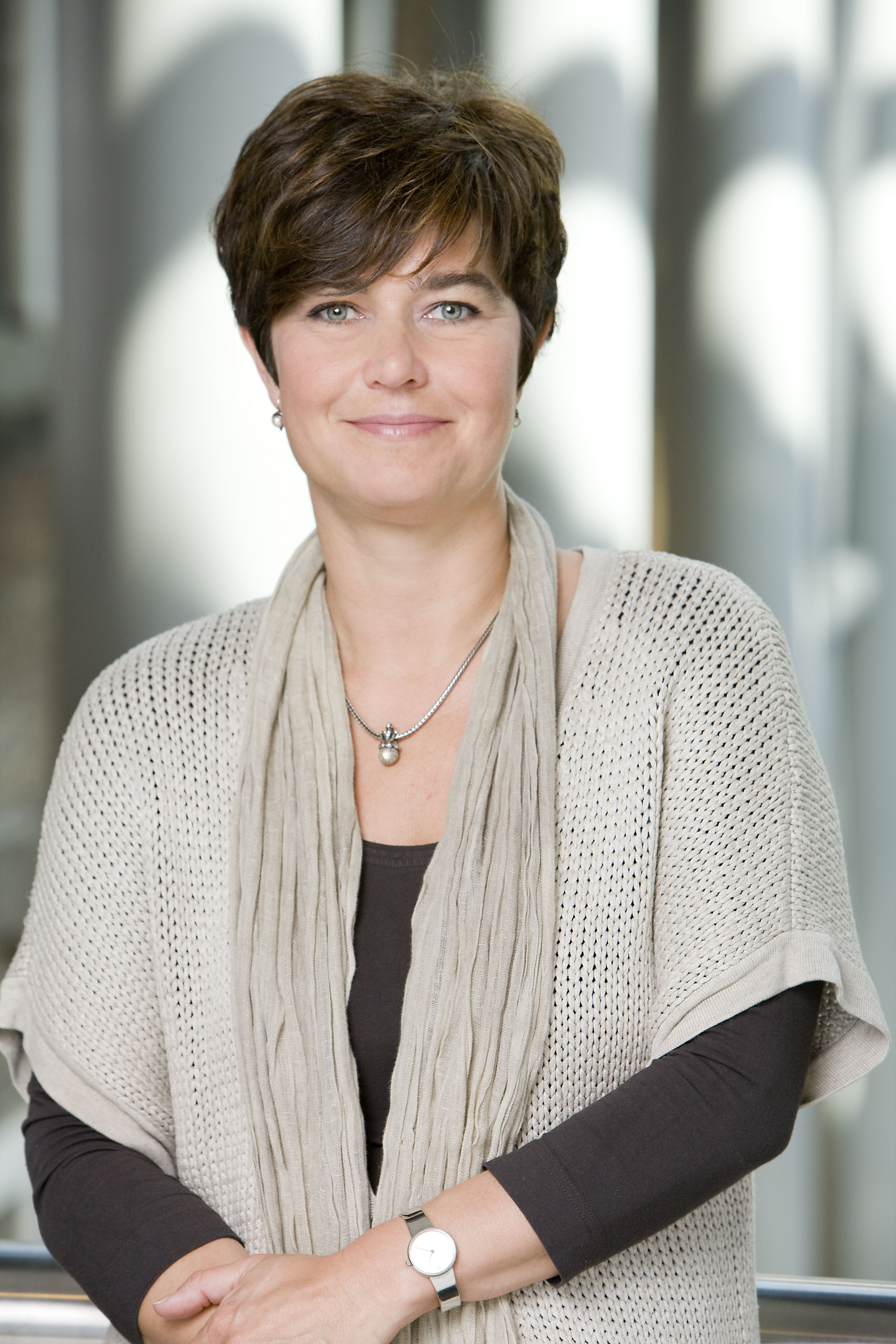
Anouchka van Miltenburg, 2011

- Maarten van Rossum (ca.1478–1555) military tactician and commander
- Elbertus Leoninus (1519 or 1520 – 1598) jurist and statesman, helped negotiate the Pacification of Ghent
- Marigje Arriens (ca.1520–1591) an alleged Dutch witch
- Caspar Barlaeus (1584–1648) polymath and Renaissance humanist, a theologian, poet, and historian
- Andreas Essenius (1618–1677) Dutch Reformed theologian, controversialist and academic
- Jacob Abraham de Mist (1749–1823) statesman, Head of State of the National Assembly of the Batavian Republic
- Lion Philips (1794–1866) tobacco merchant, grandfather of Gerard and Anton Philips
- Sophie Pressburg (1797–1854), grandmother of Anton and Gerard Philips
- Hendrik Antonie Lodewijk Hamelberg (1826–1896), consul general and special envoy of the Orange Free State
- Gerard Philips (1858–1942), industrialist, co-founder of Philips Electronics
- Anton Philips (1874–1951), industrialist, co-founder of Philips Electronics
- Johannes van Maaren (1890–1963) wrestler, competed at the 1920, 1924 and 1928 Summer Olympics
- Anouchka van Miltenburg (born 1967) retired politician

=== The arts ===
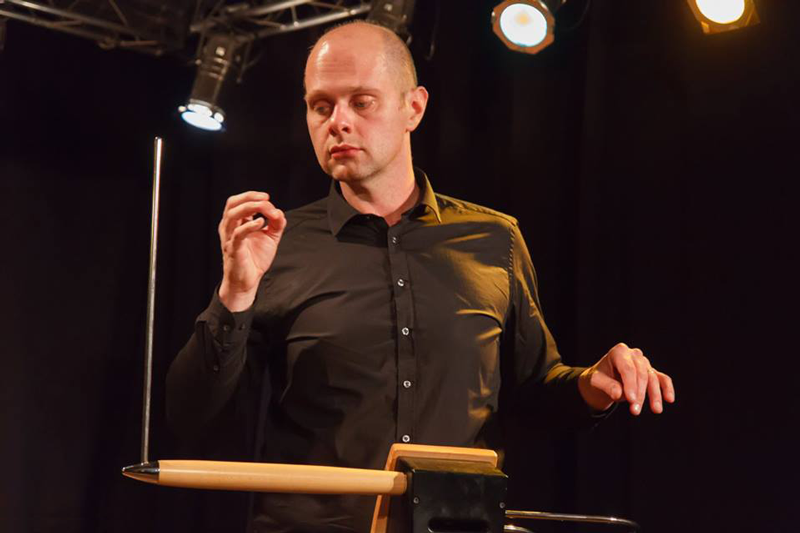
Thorwald Jørgensen, 2015

- Lucas Vorsterman (1595–1675), Baroque engraver
- Warnard van Rijsen (1625–1670), a Dutch Golden Age painter.
- Johannes Vorstermans (ca.1643– ca.1699/1719) Dutch Golden Age landscape painter.
- Gerard Hoet (1648–1743) Dutch Golden Age painter
- Jan Soukens (c.1650–c.1725) a Dutch Golden Age painter
- Suzanne Leenhoff (1829–1906), pianist, married Édouard Manet at Zaltbommel in 1863
- Anton van Anrooy (1870–1949), painter and illustrator
- Peter van Anrooy (1879–1954) composer and conductor of classical music
- Fiep Westendorp (1916-2004), illustrator
- Thorwald Jørgensen (born 1980) classical musician, specialises in the theremin

== Image gallery ==
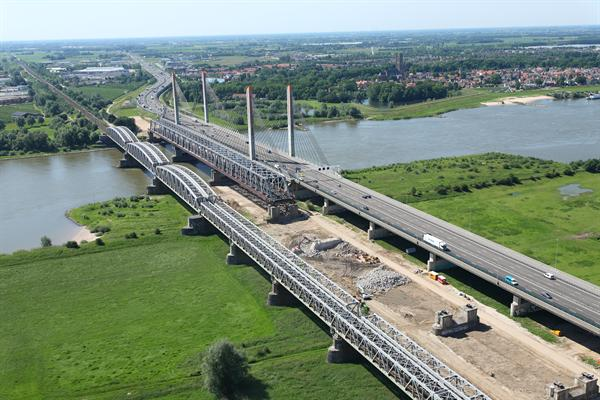
Zaltbommel (in the upper right-hand corner of the image) is situated on the banks of the Waal. Major north–south highways and railways cross the river in the town, just east of the town centre.

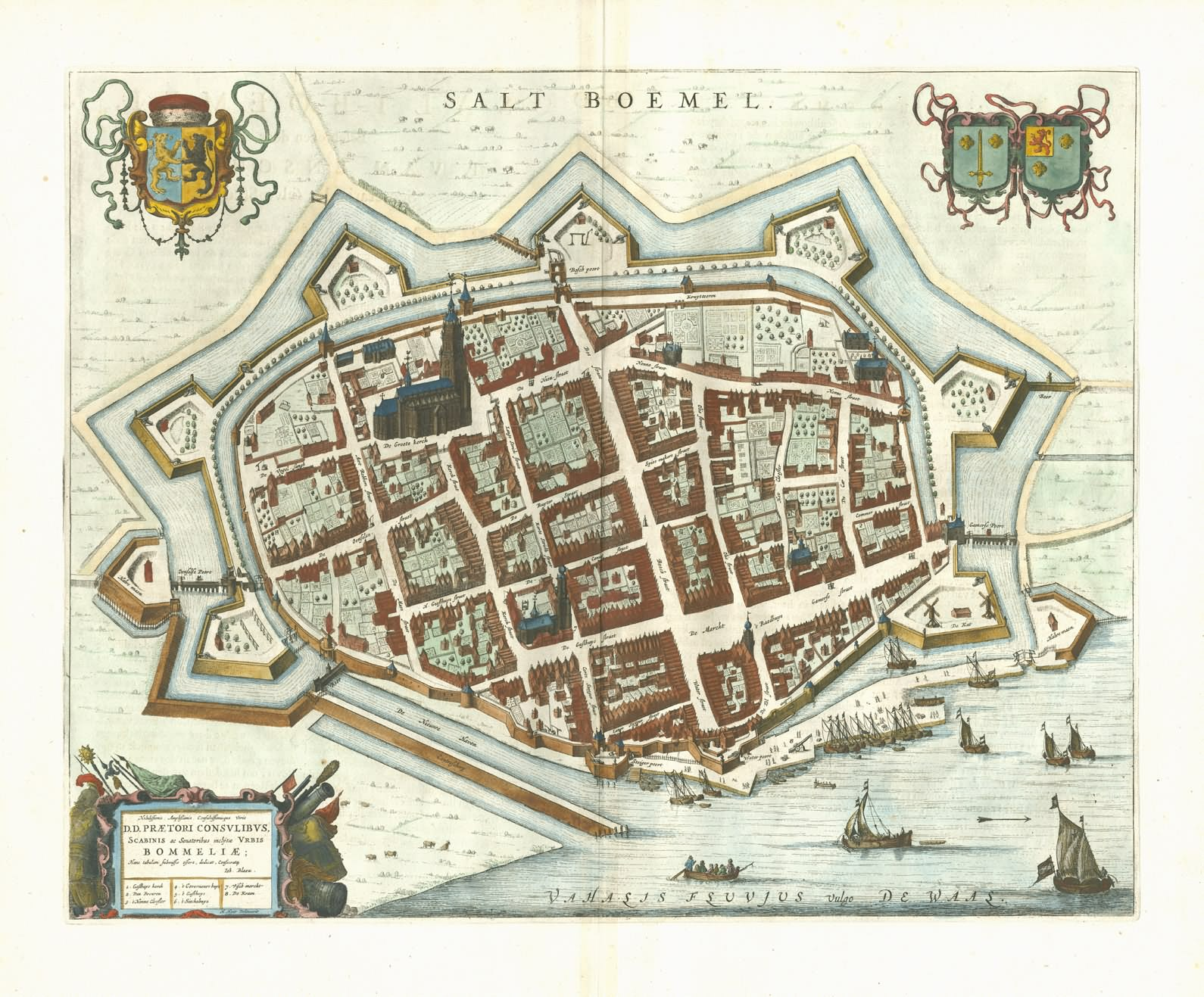
1649 map of Zaltbommel in Willem and Joan Blaeu's "Toonneel der Steden"

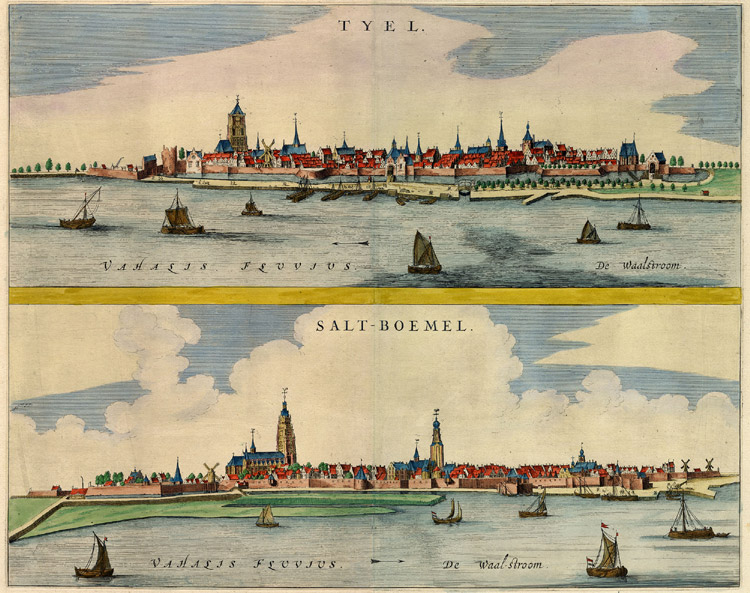
Tyel & Salt Boemel, 1649
