= Kerkwijk =

- Village
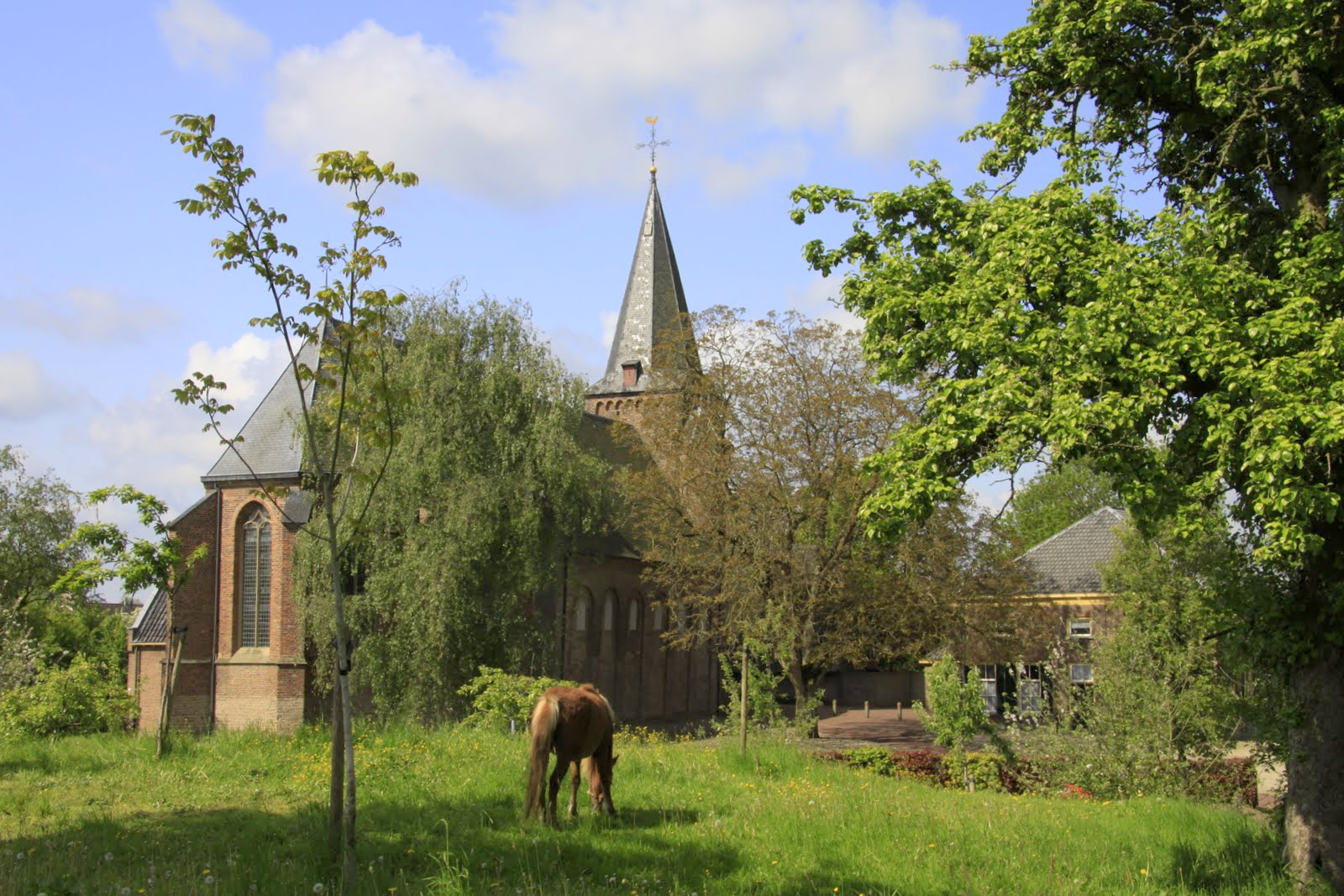

- Flag Coat of arms

- Location in the Netherlands Kerkwijk (Netherlands)
- Coordinates: 51°46′28″N 5°13′10″E
- Country: Netherlands
- Province: Gelderland
- Municipality: Zaltbommel

Area
  - Total: 7.26 km^{2} (2.80 sq mi)
- Elevation: 3 m (9.8 ft)

Population (1 January 2022)
  - Total: 696
  - Density: 95.9/km^{2} (248/sq mi)
- Time zone: UTC+1 (CET)
  - Summer (DST): UTC+2 (CEST)
- Postal code: 5315
- Dialing code: 0418

Kerkwijk is a village in the Dutch province of Gelderland. It is a part of the municipality of Zaltbommel, and lies about 11 km northwest of 's-Hertogenbosch. Kerkwijk was a separate municipality between 1818 and 1999, when it was merged with Zaltbommel.

The statistical area "Kerkwijk", which also can include the peripheral parts of the village, as well as the surrounding countryside, has a population of 696 in 2022.

It was first mentioned in the first quarter of the 13th century as Kirkevuihc, and means "church village". Kerkwijk has a church that dates back to the 11th century, consisting of a Romanesque nave, a late-Romanesque tower and a Gothic tower from the fifteenth century. The church has wooden vaults with paintings from the fifteenth century. In 1840, Kerkwijk was home to 169 people.

== Gallery ==
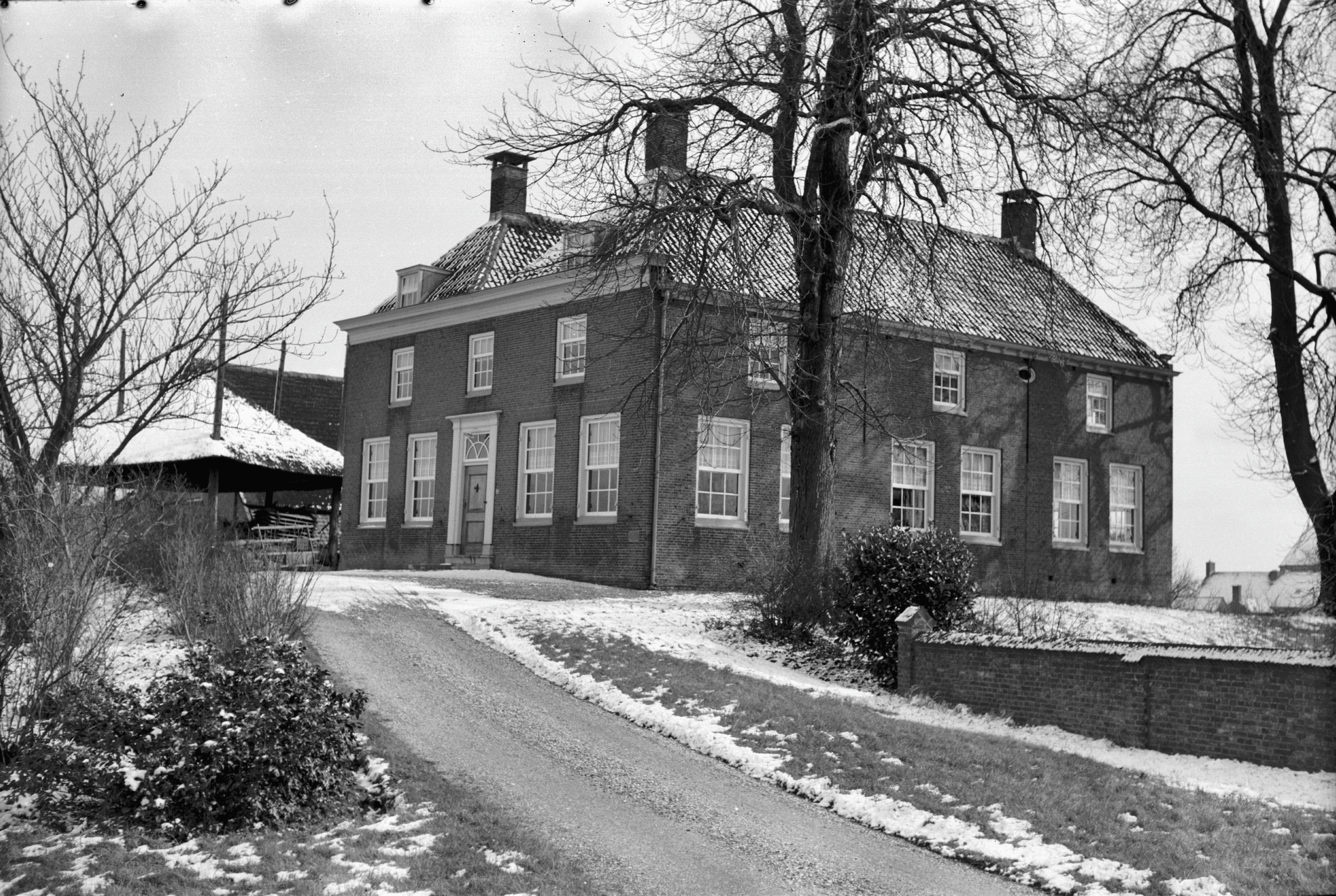
Villa 't Hemelrijk

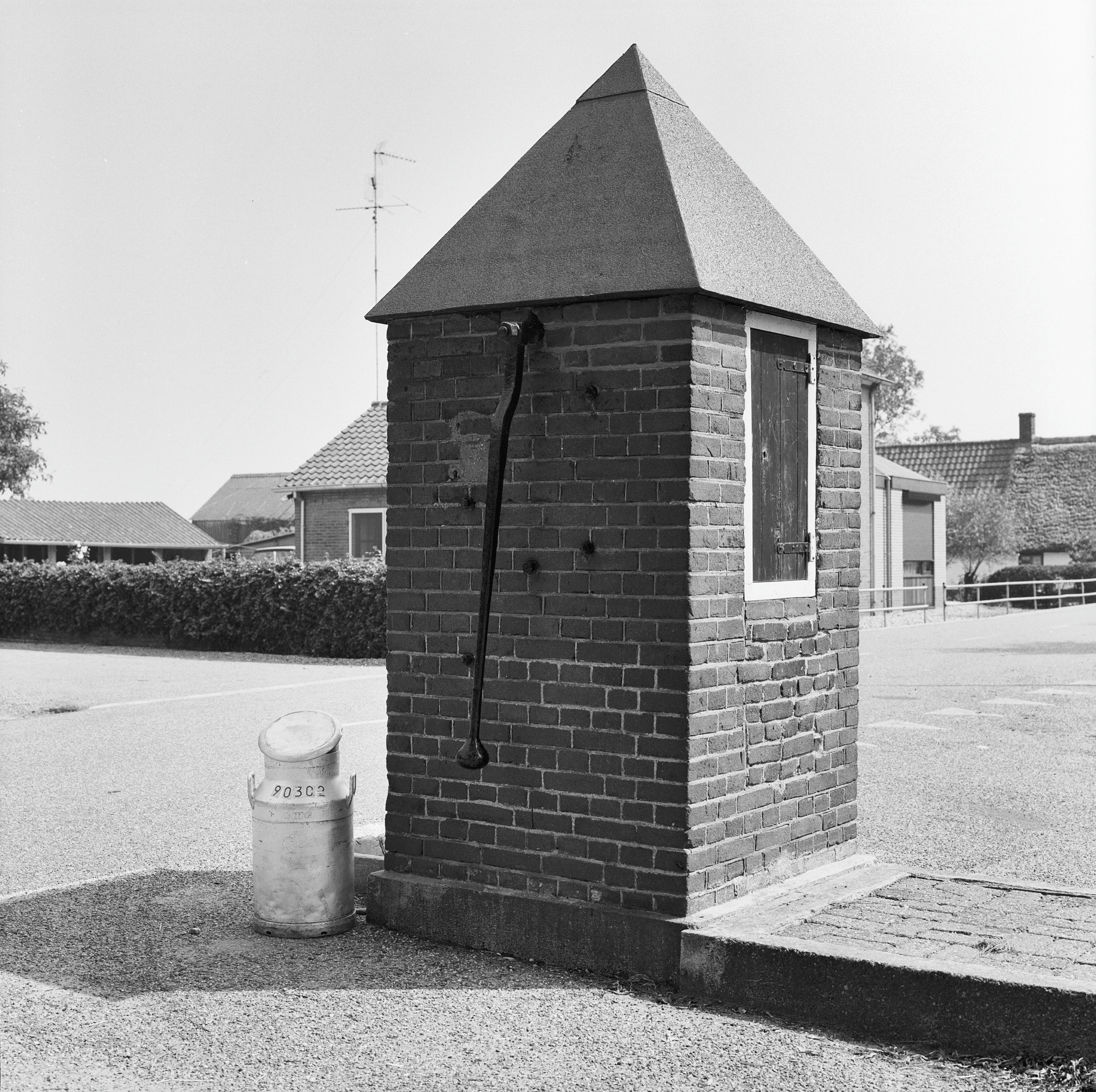
Village pump
