= Nekkeveld estate =

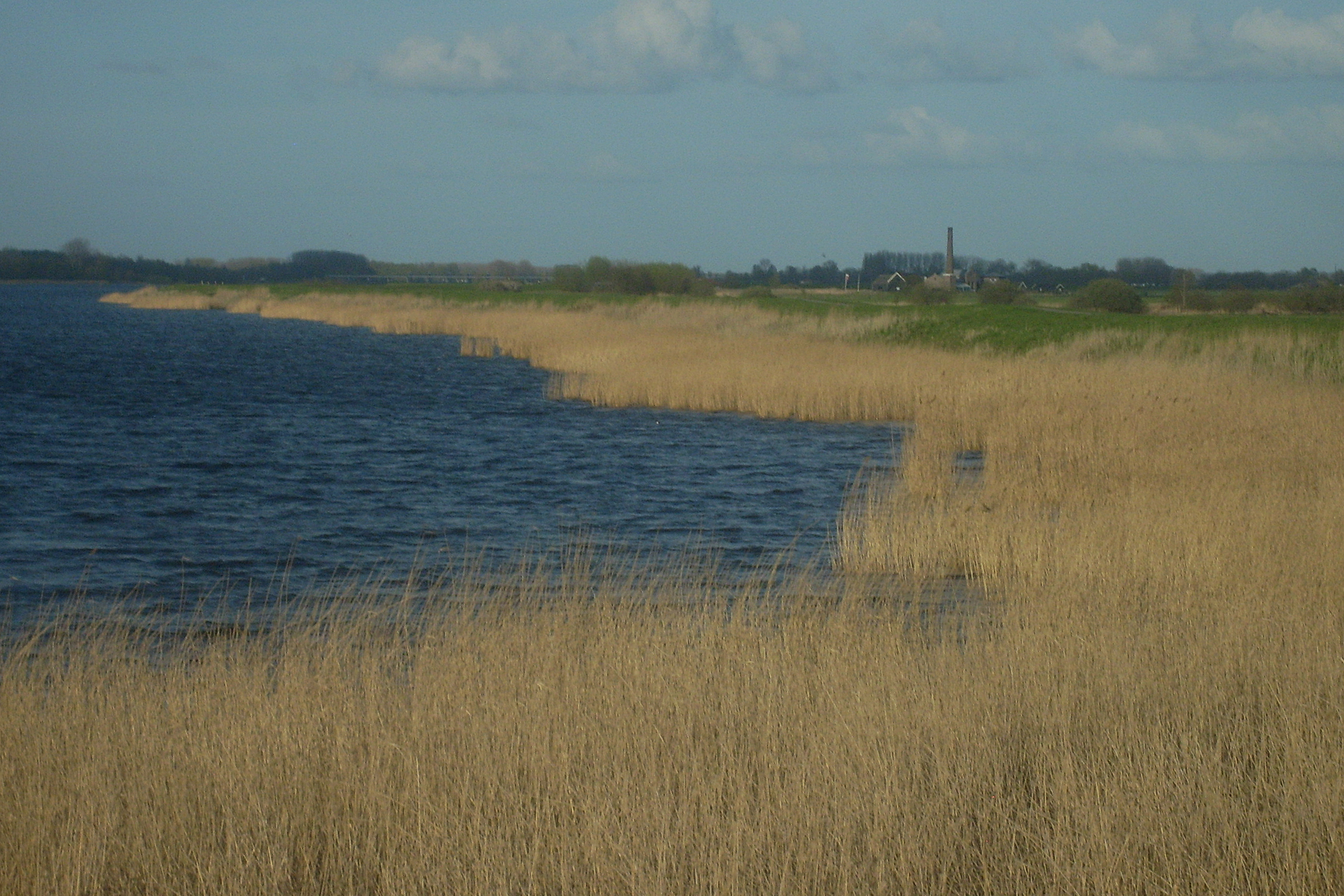
Delta of the Dutch Randstad on foot of the former Zuiderzee dyke and near drowned castle Hulkestein.

The Polder oasis Nekkeveld estate is an area located in the urban heart of Holland, the Netherlands, near Amsterdam, and is part of the hamlet Nekkeveld in the polder Arkemheen. This green oasis is situated in the delta of the Dutch Randstad, at the foot of the former Zuiderzee dyke and near the drowned Castle Hulkestein, now lake Nijkerkernauw. The natural status of the area is protected for its flora and fauna (water and meadow birds) by regional and European law: Natura 2000. The notability of Nekkeveld estate in this respect is acknowledged by the independent governmental waterboard Waterschap Vallei en Veluwe, stating this "(...) improves ecosystems for water animals and meadow birds". Also, the governmental institution Staatsbosbeheer (Dutch Forestry Commission) specifically notified the project for its breeding results with the godwit, Holland's national bird.

God created the world, and the Dutch created: Holland (English saying).

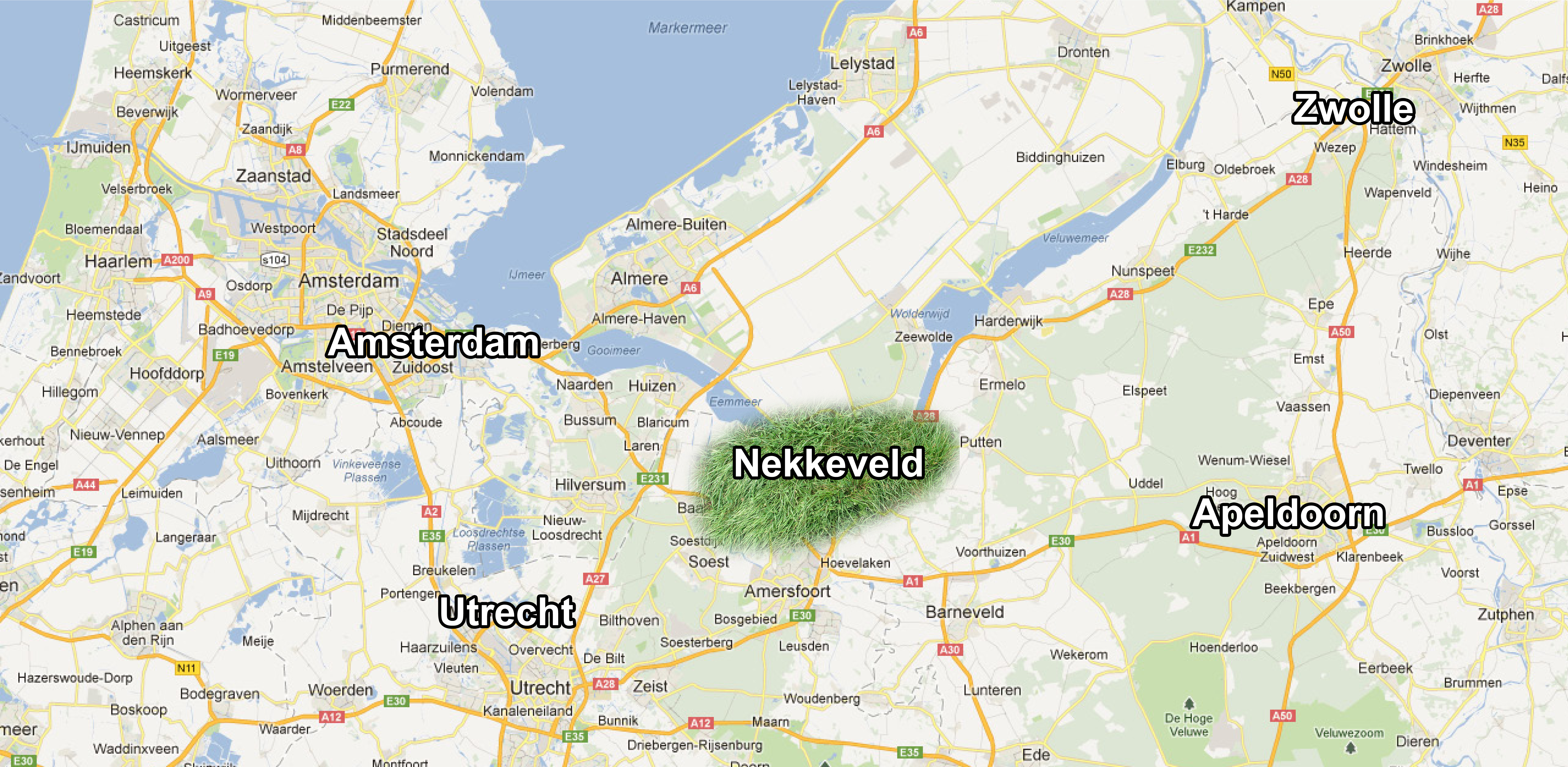
Nekkeveld estate is situated as a cityside oasis of the Dutch urban agglomeration Randstad.

Started in the late 20th century as the project NekkeveldEcoplus, in the first quarter of the 21st century the total area is about 150.000 square meters. The conserved old farm originates from medieval times. The area called 'green paradise' for living and creative purposes was built in 2009–architecture by Henk Leeflang, whose design has been praised for its natural match with the polder landscape. Solar energy devices were added in 2013, making the project energy independent. Also the supply of drinking water has its own natural source. The built user area is approximately 3000 cubic meters.

The State Secretary for Economic Affairs and the Minister of Finance officially (July 6, 2016) allowed polder oasis Nekkeveld estate the governmental recognition of classification by law according to the Dutch Natuurschoonwet 1928. The estate is a member of the Dutch Federation for Private Landownership.

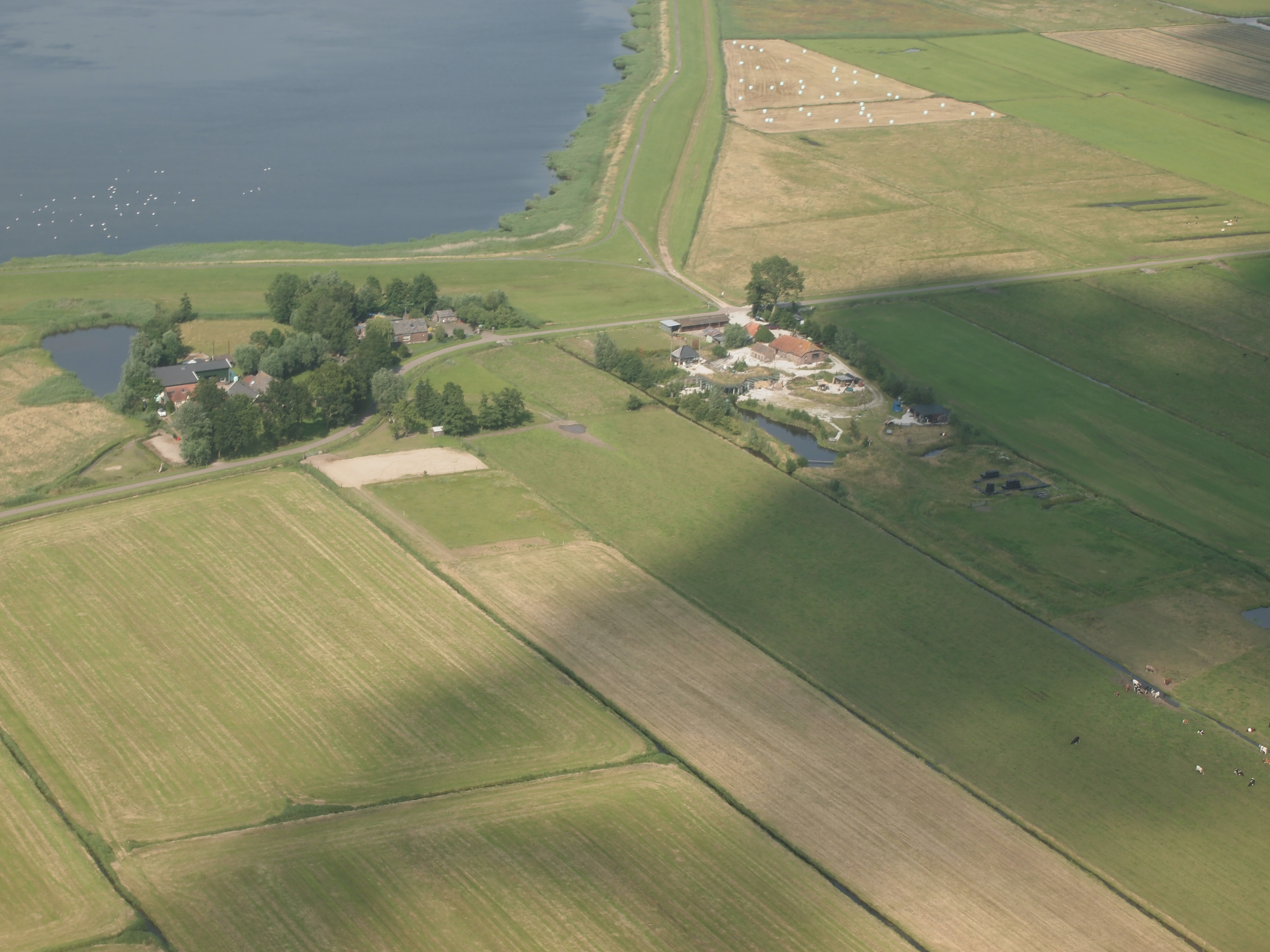
The inspiring area for living and creative purposes has been built in 2009. Architecture bij Henk Leeflang.

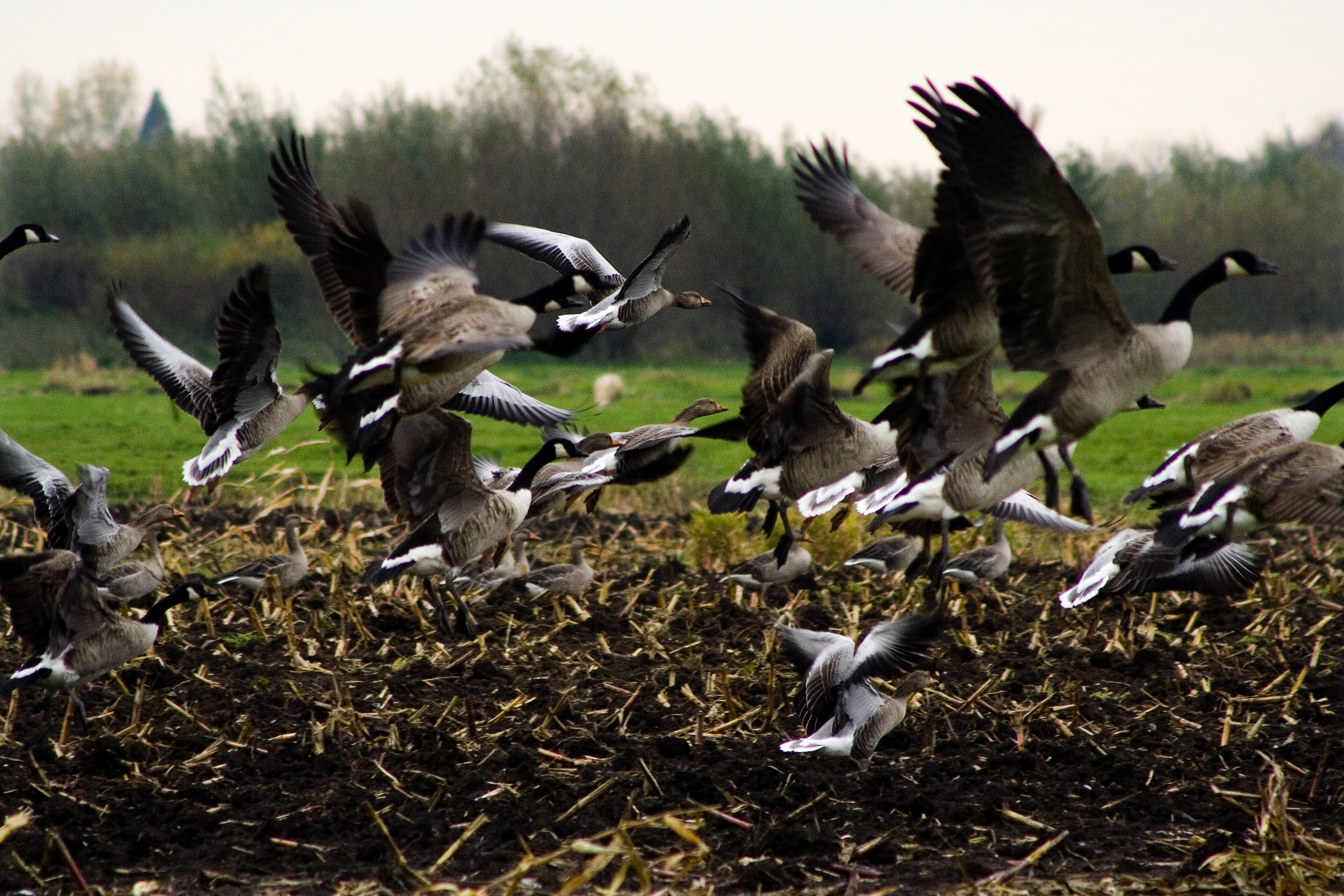
Winter palace for geese and swans, Arctican birds.

Founding father Sir Douwe Veldhuizen – van de Geest who now is in his seventies, is keen on stepping back in order to make space and inspire younger talent. His part of the story is told in an online available book: Polder oasis Nekkeveld estate–endless stories of creation and development.

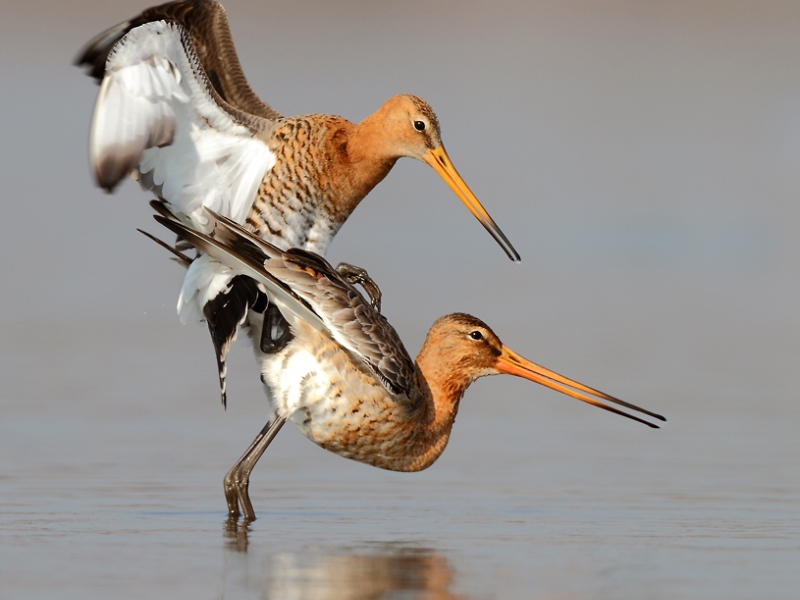
Godwits mating

'Polder poem: The godwits are back'

Grey and wet it still is

But the lapwing birds are calling, they tumble and fly

And despite rainy depressions

Also the godwit is heard

They make love

Lapwing birds tumble

And the hares dance

^{(by: Douwe Veldhuizen)}
^{Placed with consent of the poet.}

== Inspiration ==
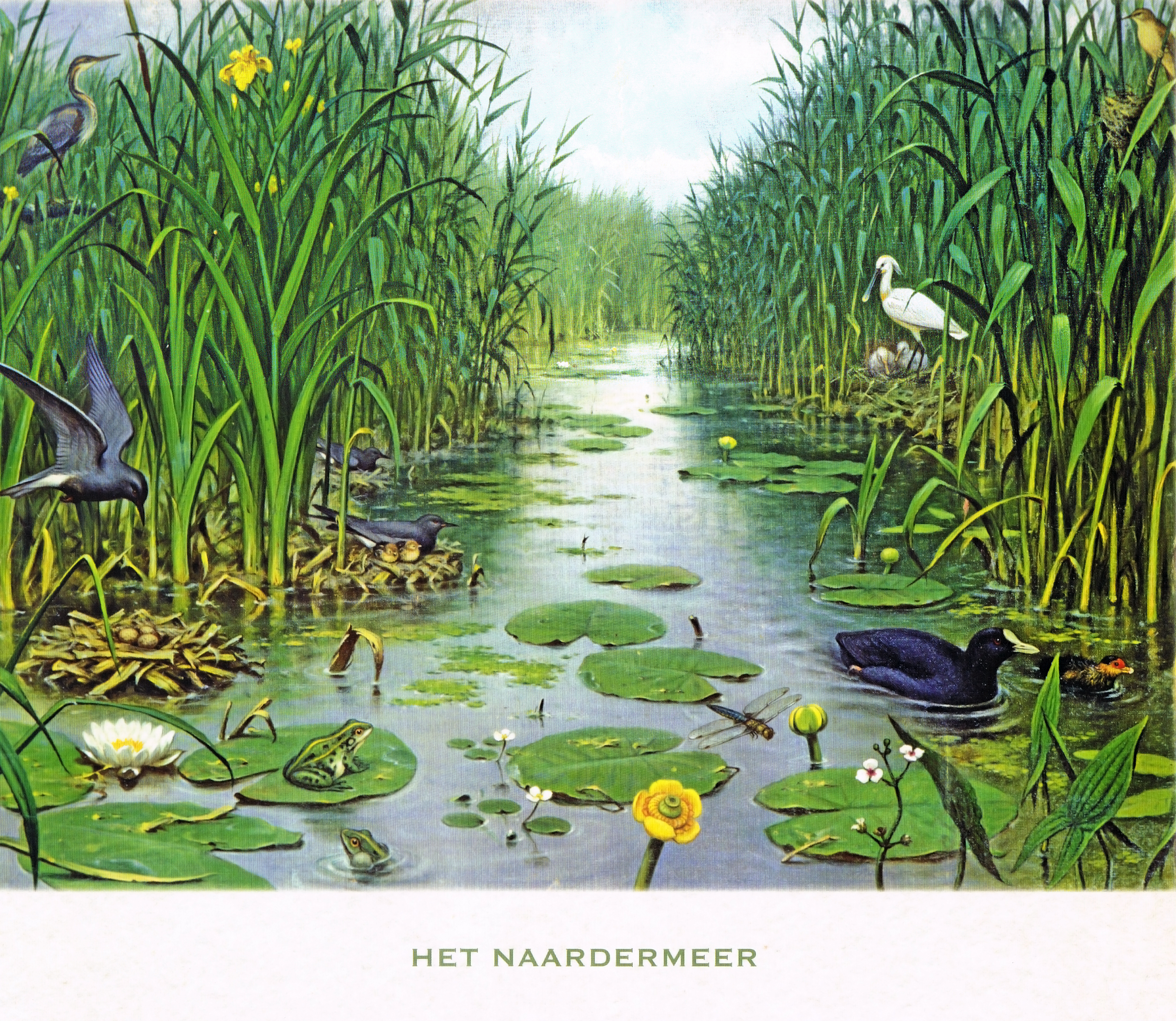
The Naardermeer by Marinus Adrianus Koekkoek.

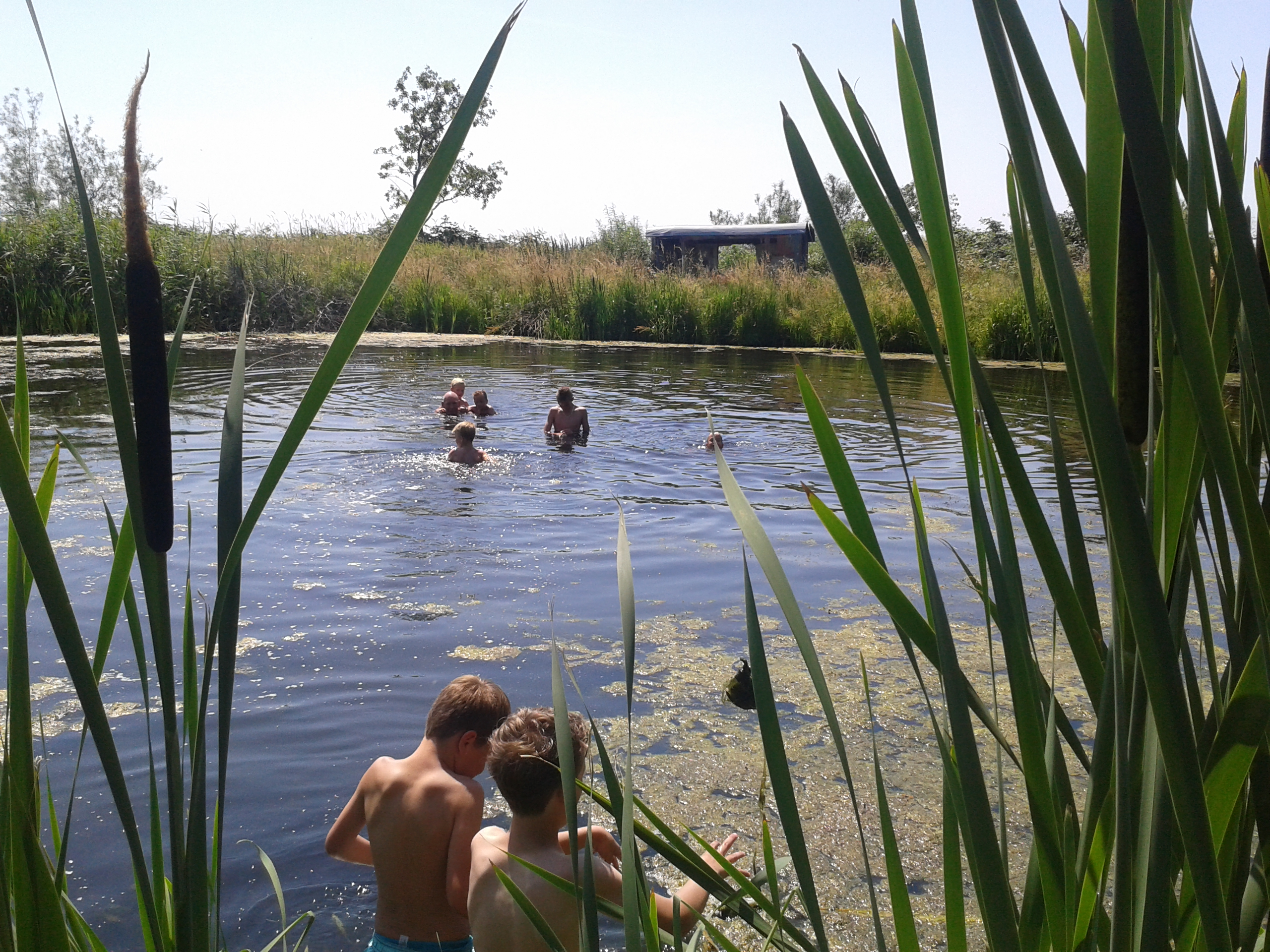
... to step back in order to make space and inspire younger talent.

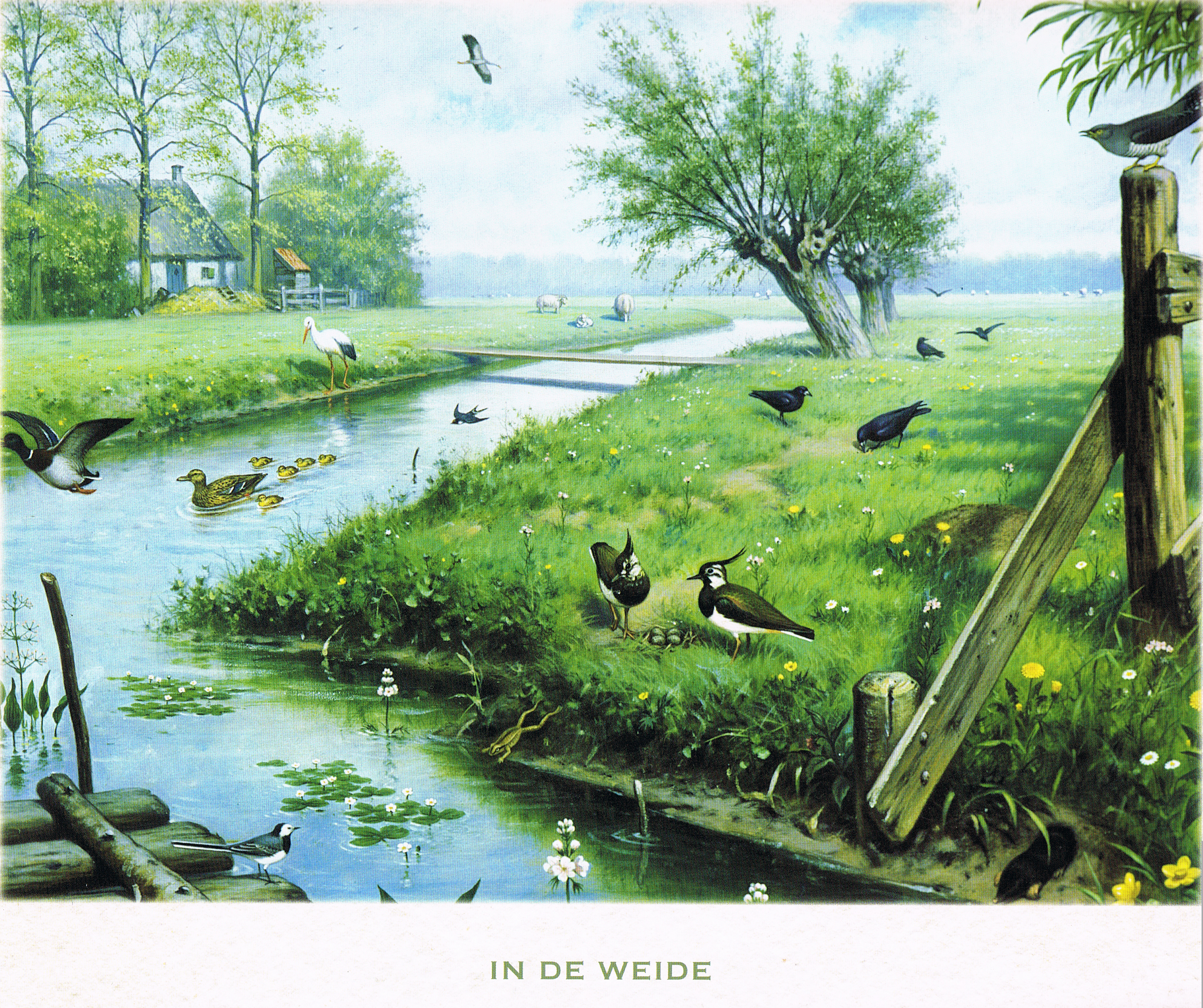
In the meadow by Marinus Adrianus Koekkoek.

The project NekkeveldEcoplus is inspired by the work of the Dutch artist Marinus Adrianus Koekkoek
