= Holkerveen =

- Hamlet
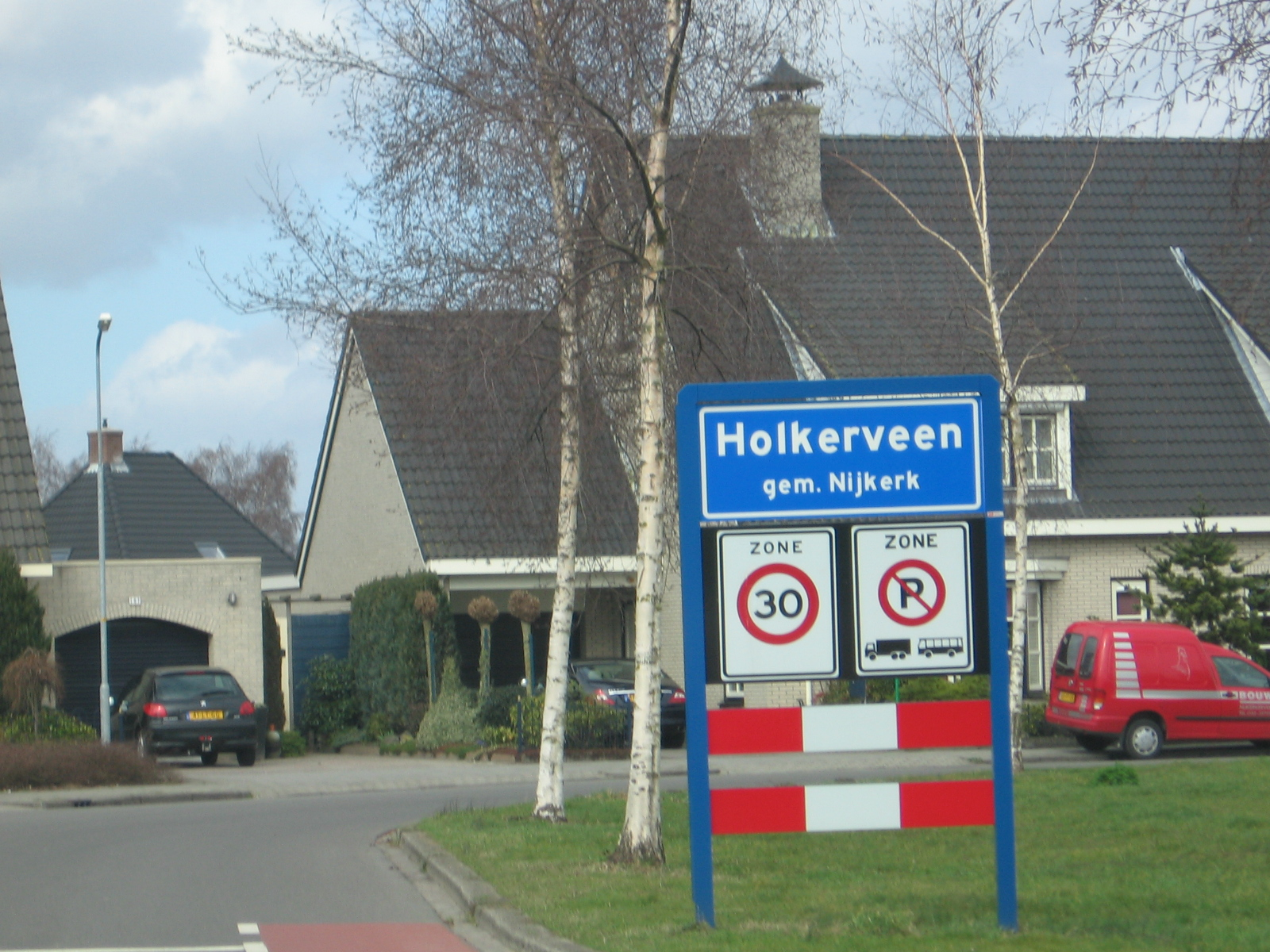
- Entrance to Hokerveen

- Holkerveen in the municipality of Nijkerk.

- Location in the province of Gelderland in the Netherlands Holkerveen (Netherlands)
- Coordinates: 52°12′N 5°27′E
- Country: Netherlands
- Province: Gelderland
- Municipality: Nijkerk

Area
  - Total: 1.71 km^{2} (0.66 sq mi)

Population (2021)
  - Total: 590
  - Density: 350/km^{2} (890/sq mi)
- Time zone: UTC+1 (CET)
  - Summer (DST): UTC+2 (CEST)
- Postal code: 3864
- Dialing code: 033

Holkerveen is a hamlet in the Dutch province of Gelderland. It is a part of the municipality of Nijkerk and lies about six kilometers northeast of Amersfoort.

It was first mentioned in 1994 as Holkerveen, and means bog near Holk. The hamlet started in the 19th century as a peat colony. The postal authorities have placed it under Nijkerkerveen.
