= Achterhoek (disambiguation) =

Achterhoek is a region in the east of Gelderland in the Netherlands.

Achterhoek may also refer to:

- Achterhoek (Nijkerk), a village in Gelderland, Netherlands
- Achterhoek (Overijssel), a village in Overijssel, Netherlands
