= Driedorp =

- Hamlet
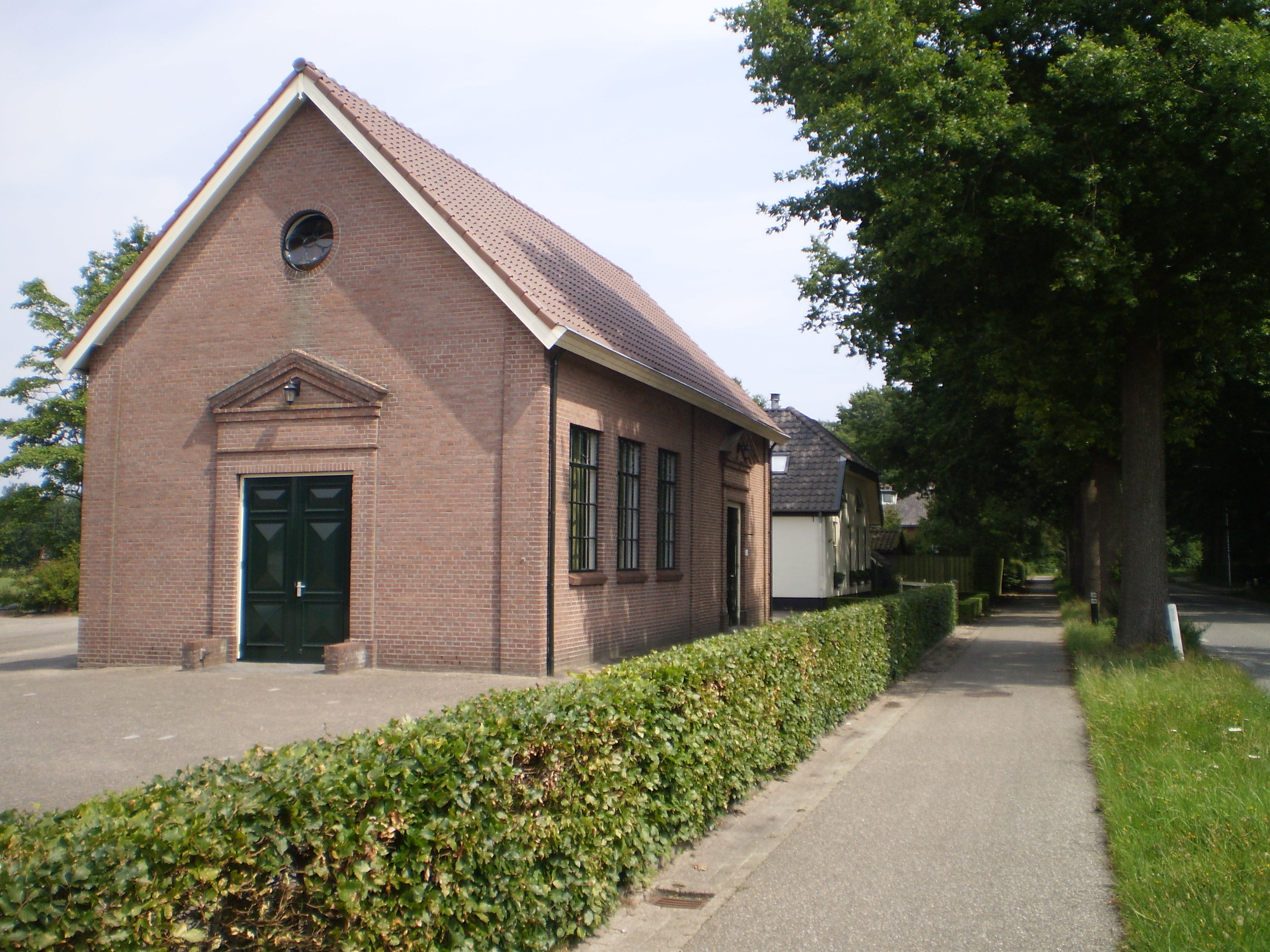
- Church of Driedorp

- Driedorp in the municipality of Nijkerk.

- Location in the province of Gelderland in the Netherlands Driedorp (Netherlands)
- Coordinates: 52.20663°N 5.51876°E
- Country: Netherlands
- Province: Gelderland
- Municipality: Nijkerk

Area
  - Total: 5.35 km^{2} (2.07 sq mi)

Population (2021)
  - Total: 340
  - Density: 64/km^{2} (160/sq mi)
- Time zone: UTC+1 (CET)
  - Summer (DST): UTC+2 (CEST)
- Postal code: 3862
- Dialing code: 033

Driedorp is a hamlet in the Dutch province of Gelderland. It is a part of the municipality of Nijkerk, and lies about 10 km east of Amersfoort.

It was first mentioned in 1874 as Driedorp and probably means "village of three houses". The postal authorities have placed it under Nijkerk. The village developed in the late 19th century, and used to have a railway stop from 1903 until 1933. A little church was built in 1867 and since 2010, it is an independent church, because it did not want to join the united Protestant Church in the Netherlands. In 2019, it won the competition for the most beautiful place name in Gelderland.

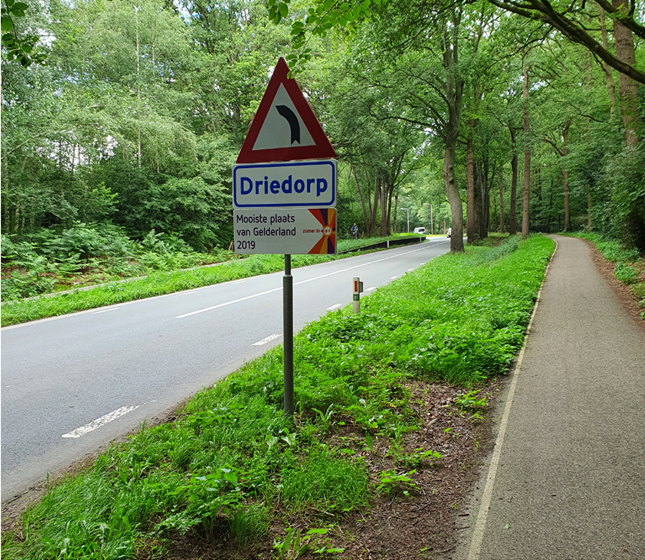
Place name sign
