= Prinsenkamp =

- Town
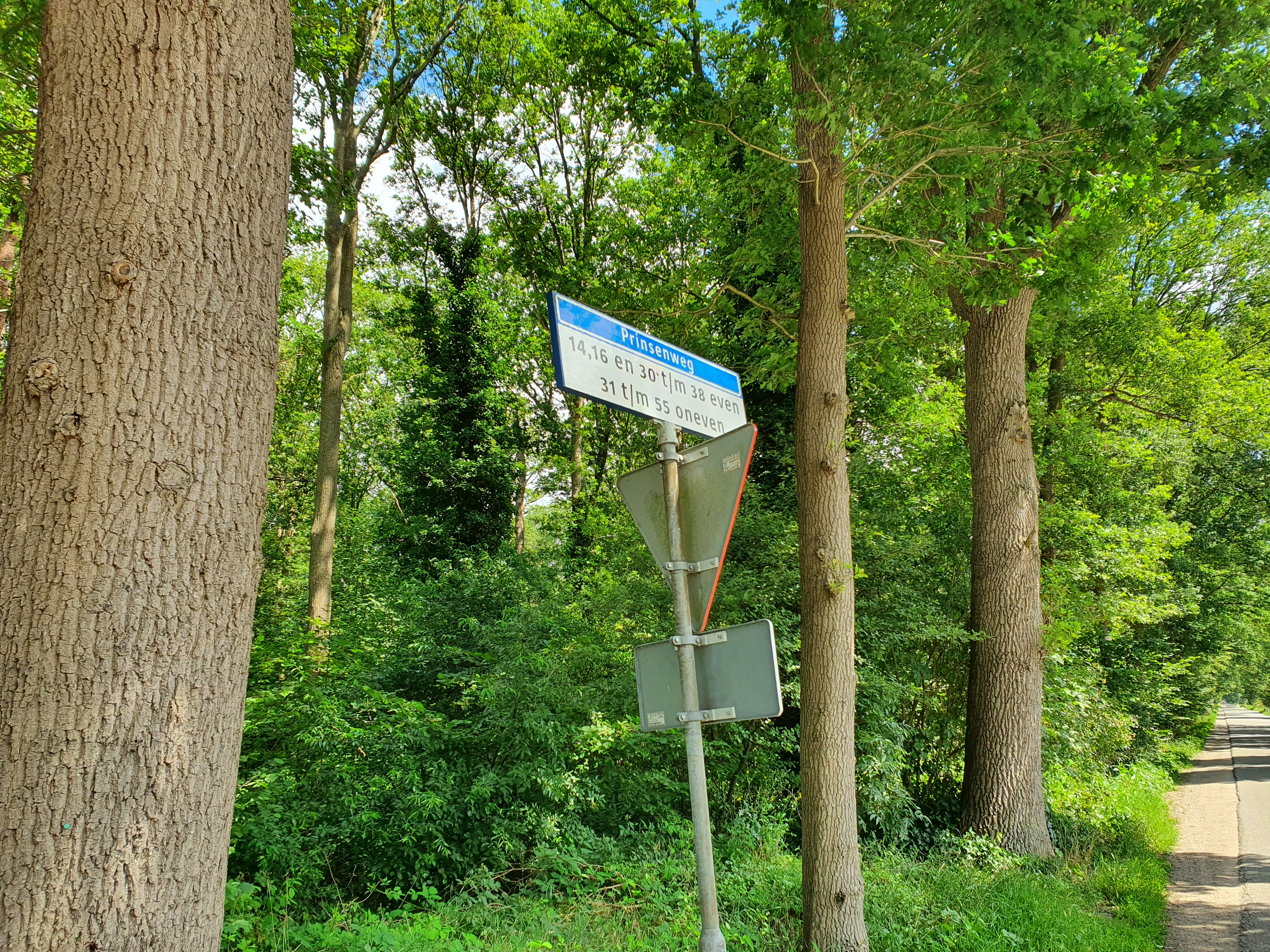
- Street sign in Prinsenkamp

- Prinsenkamp in the municipality of Nijkerk.

- Location in the province of Gelderland in the Netherlands Prinsenkamp (Netherlands)
- Coordinates: 52.20227°N 5.61811°E
- Country: Netherlands
- Province: Gelderland
- Municipality: Nijkerk

Area
  - Total: 2.35 km^{2} (0.91 sq mi)

Population (2021)
  - Total: 350
  - Density: 150/km^{2} (390/sq mi)
- Time zone: UTC+1 (CET)
  - Summer (DST): UTC+2 (CEST)
- Postal code: 3862
- Dialing code: 033

Prinsenkamp is a hamlet in the Dutch province of Gelderland. It is a part of the municipality of Nijkerk, and lies about 16 km east of Amersfoort.

It was first mentioned in 1835 as Achterste Prinsenkamp, and means "fenced off land belonging to the Prinsen family". The postal authorities have placed it under Nijkerk. There are no place name signs. During World War II, most farms were destroyed. Nowadays, there are about 270 holiday homes in Prinsenkamp.
