= Nijkerk =

- Municipality
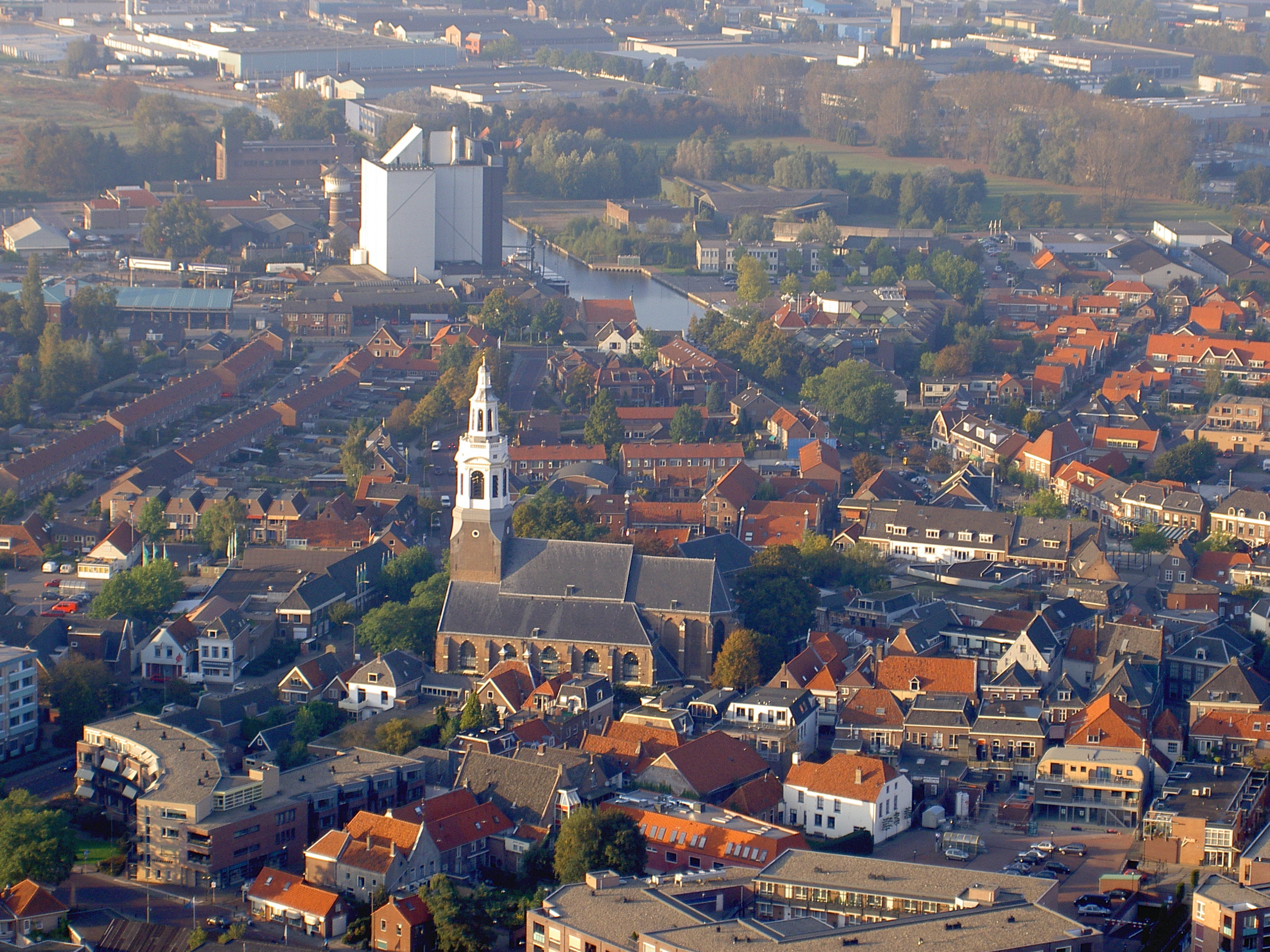
- Aerial view of Nijkerk

- Flag Coat of arms

- Location in Gelderland
- Coordinates: 52°14′N 5°29′E
- Country: Netherlands
- Province: Gelderland

Government
  - Body: Municipal council
  - Mayor: Gerard Renkema (CDA)

Area
  - Total: 72.04 km^{2} (27.81 sq mi)
  - Land: 69.34 km^{2} (26.77 sq mi)
  - Water: 2.70 km^{2} (1.04 sq mi)
- Elevation: 1 m (3.3 ft)

Population (January 2021)
  - Total: 43,600
  - Density: 629/km^{2} (1,630/sq mi)
- Demonym: Nijkerker
- Time zone: UTC+1 (CET)
  - Summer (DST): UTC+2 (CEST)
- Postcode: 3860–3871
- Area code: 033
- Website: www.nijkerk.eu

Nijkerk (Dutch pronunciation: [ˈnɛikɛr(ə)k]; Dutch Low Saxon: Niekark) is a municipality and a city located in the middle of the Netherlands, in the province of Gelderland.

== Population centres ==
- Achterhoek
- Appel
- De Veenhuis
- Doornsteeg
- Driedorp
- Hoevelaken
- Holk
- Holkerveen
- Kruishaar
- Nekkeveld
- Nijkerkerveen
- Prinsenkamp
- Slichtenhorst
- 't Woud
- Wullenhove

Some people state that Groot Corlaer is a population centre on its own, but it is officially part of Nijkerk.

== Transportation ==
Railway station: Nijkerk

== The city of Nijkerk ==
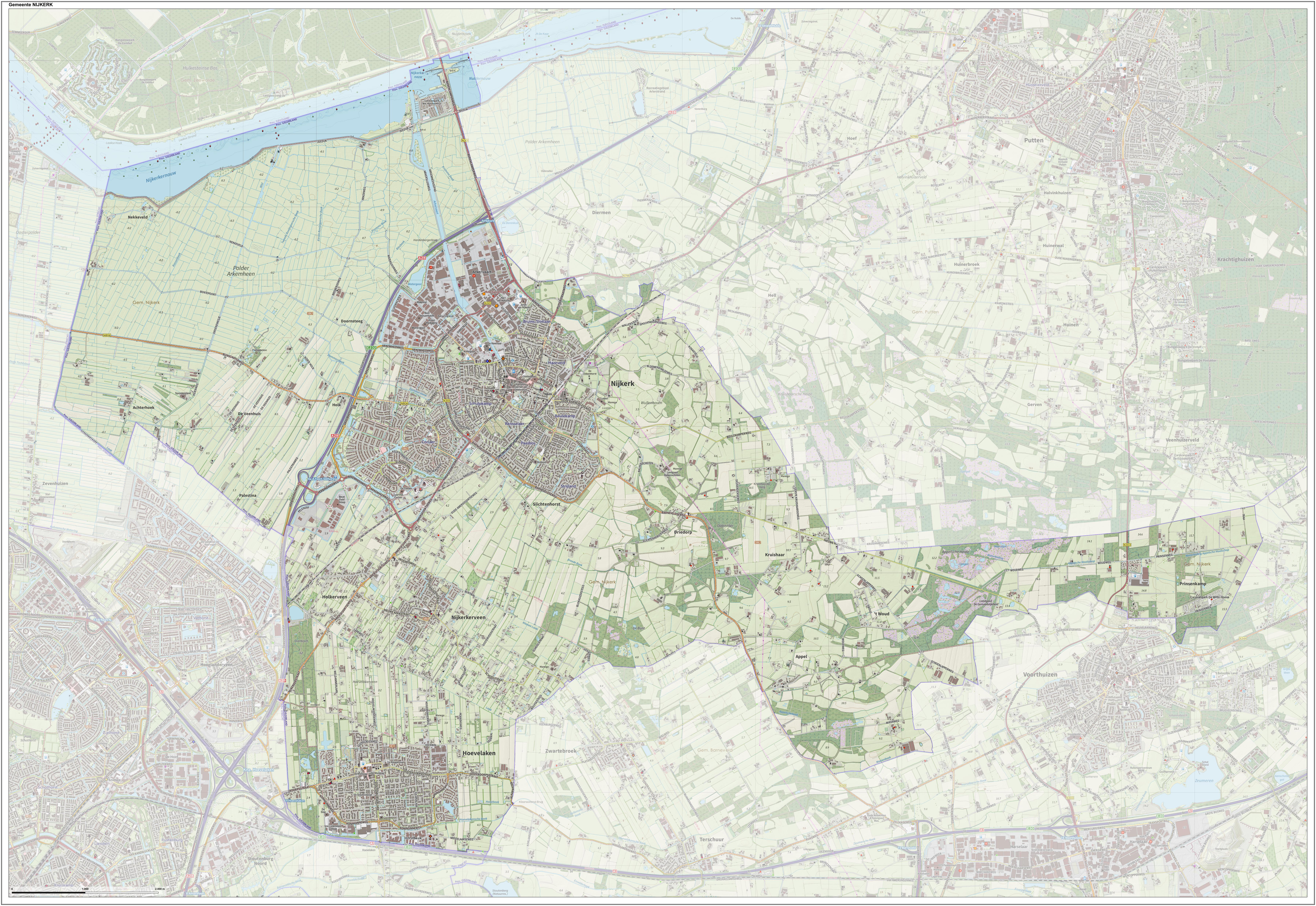
Map of Nijkerk, June 2015

The name Nijkerk stems from Nieuwe Kerk (Dutch for New Church). This new church was built after the old chapel had been destroyed by fire in 1221. Nijkerk was strategically located between the Duchy of Guelders (Dutch: Hertogdom Gelre) and the Bishopric of Utrecht. Because of this strategic location Nijkerk regularly was the scene of war, and in 1412 the village was completely destroyed. It was restored and Nijkerk received city rights in 1413. In 1421 the church that gave Nijkerk its name burnt down and was replaced; this happened several times, until a new church, the Grote-of-Sint-Catharinakerk; was built in the 18th century. It still stands today. The organ in this church was built in 1756 by Mathijs van Deventer.

In the 18th century Nijkerk was a flourishing merchant city. Several inhabitants traveled to the New World, including Arent van Curler and Kiliaen van Rensselaer and founded new cities.

Since World War II, Nijkerk has grown rapidly. It is situated on the (former) shore of the IJsselmeer, which allows for transportation of goods via ships, and in the proximity of two major motorways, the E30 (A1) and E232 (A28). This allowed local industries to grow, and also encouraged people who work in the nearby Randstad to move to the more rural and peaceful town of Nijkerk.

== Politics ==
In 2000, the municipalities of Nijkerk and Hoevelaken merged to form the new municipality of Nijkerk. On August 24, 2011, the municipality announced that Nijkerk had passed the mark of 40,000 inhabitants. The city council was consequently expanded to 27 seats from the 2014 election and 29 from the 2026 election.

After the 2026 municipal elections the seats divided as follows:

Party	Seats
CDA	6
Christian Union and SGP	5
Lokale Partij	5
Forum for Democracy	4
VVD	4
Progressief 21	4
Voor Ons	1

Progressief 21 is a local party combining the local branches of Democrats 66, GroenLinks and the Labour Party. The Lokale Partij has no national connection.

== Geography ==
=== Climate ===
Climate data for Nijkerk
Month	Jan	Feb	Mar	Apr	May	Jun	Jul	Aug	Sep	Oct	Nov	Dec	Year
Record high °C (°F)	14.9 (58.8)	18.9 (66.0)	25.4 (77.7)	29.2 (84.6)	31.5 (88.7)	33.9 (93.0)	37.5 (99.5)	36.1 (97.0)	29.6 (85.3)	26.9 (80.4)	19.0 (66.2)	15.3 (59.5)	37.5 (99.5)
Mean daily maximum °C (°F)	5.5 (41.9)	6.0 (42.8)	9.5 (49.1)	13.5 (56.3)	18.0 (64.4)	20.0 (68.0)	22.5 (72.5)	22.5 (72.5)	19.0 (66.2)	14.5 (58.1)	9.5 (49.1)	6.0 (42.8)	13.9 (57.0)
Mean daily minimum °C (°F)	0.0 (32.0)	0.0 (32.0)	2.0 (35.6)	4.0 (39.2)	8.0 (46.4)	10.5 (50.9)	13.0 (55.4)	12.5 (54.5)	10.0 (50.0)	7.0 (44.6)	3.5 (38.3)	1.0 (33.8)	6.0 (42.7)
Record low °C (°F)	−20.3 (−4.5)	−21.9 (−7.4)	−16.9 (1.6)	−8.4 (16.9)	−2.9 (26.8)	−0.4 (31.3)	2.5 (36.5)	2.9 (37.2)	−2.2 (28.0)	−7.4 (18.7)	−11.2 (11.8)	−15.5 (4.1)	−21.9 (−7.4)
Average precipitation mm (inches)	75 (3.0)	55 (2.2)	75 (3.0)	45 (1.8)	65 (2.6)	70 (2.8)	80 (3.1)	80 (3.1)	75 (3.0)	80 (3.1)	85 (3.3)	85 (3.3)	870 (34.3)
Mean monthly sunshine hours	60	85	125	175	210	195	205	190	140	110	60	50	1,605
Source 1:
Source 2:

== Notable residents ==
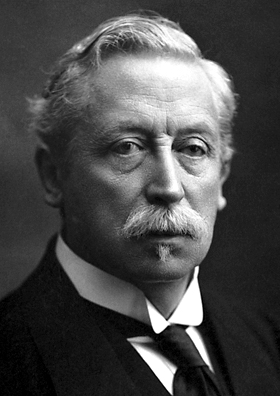
Christiaan Eijkman, 1929

- Kiliaen van Rensselaer (1586 in Hasselt – ca.1642), merchant and Hudson Valley patroon
- Wouter van Twiller (1606 in Nijkerk – 1654) the Director of New Netherland 1632 to 1638.
- Arent van Curler (1619 in Nijkerk – 1667), founder of Schenectady, New York
- Johann Frederik Eijkman (1851 in Nijkerk – 1915), chemist
- James Kwast (1852 in Nijkerk – 1927), pianist and teacher
- Christiaan Eijkman (1858 in Nijkerk – 1930), physician and professor of physiology, received the Nobel Prize for Physiology or Medicine in 1929 for the discovery of vitamins
- Jakob van Domselaer (1890 in Nijkerk – 1960), composer, part of De Stijl with Piet Mondrian
- Bernardus Johannes Alfrink (1900 in Nijkerk – 1987), Cardinal, Roman Catholic Archdiocese of Utrecht
- Henri Nouwen (1932 in Nijkerk – 1996), Catholic priest, professor, writer and theologian
- Kees de Kort (1934 in Nijkerk – 2022) an artist, illustrates Bible scenes for children's books.
- Norbert Klein (1956 – 2021), politician
- Levi van Veluw (born 1985 in Hoevelaken), contemporary artist using photographs, videos and sculptures

=== Sport ===
- Brigitte van der Lans (born 1968 in Hoevelaken), former backstroke swimmer, competed at the 1984 Summer Olympics
- Bram van Polen (born 1985 in Nijkerk), footballer, 385 caps with PEC Zwolle
- Scott Deroue (born 1995 in Nijkerkerveen), motorcycle racer
- Donny van de Beek (born 1997 in Nijkerkerveen), professional footballer

== Twin town ==
Nijkerk is twinned with

- (New York (state)) Schenectady, New York, United States

== Gallery ==
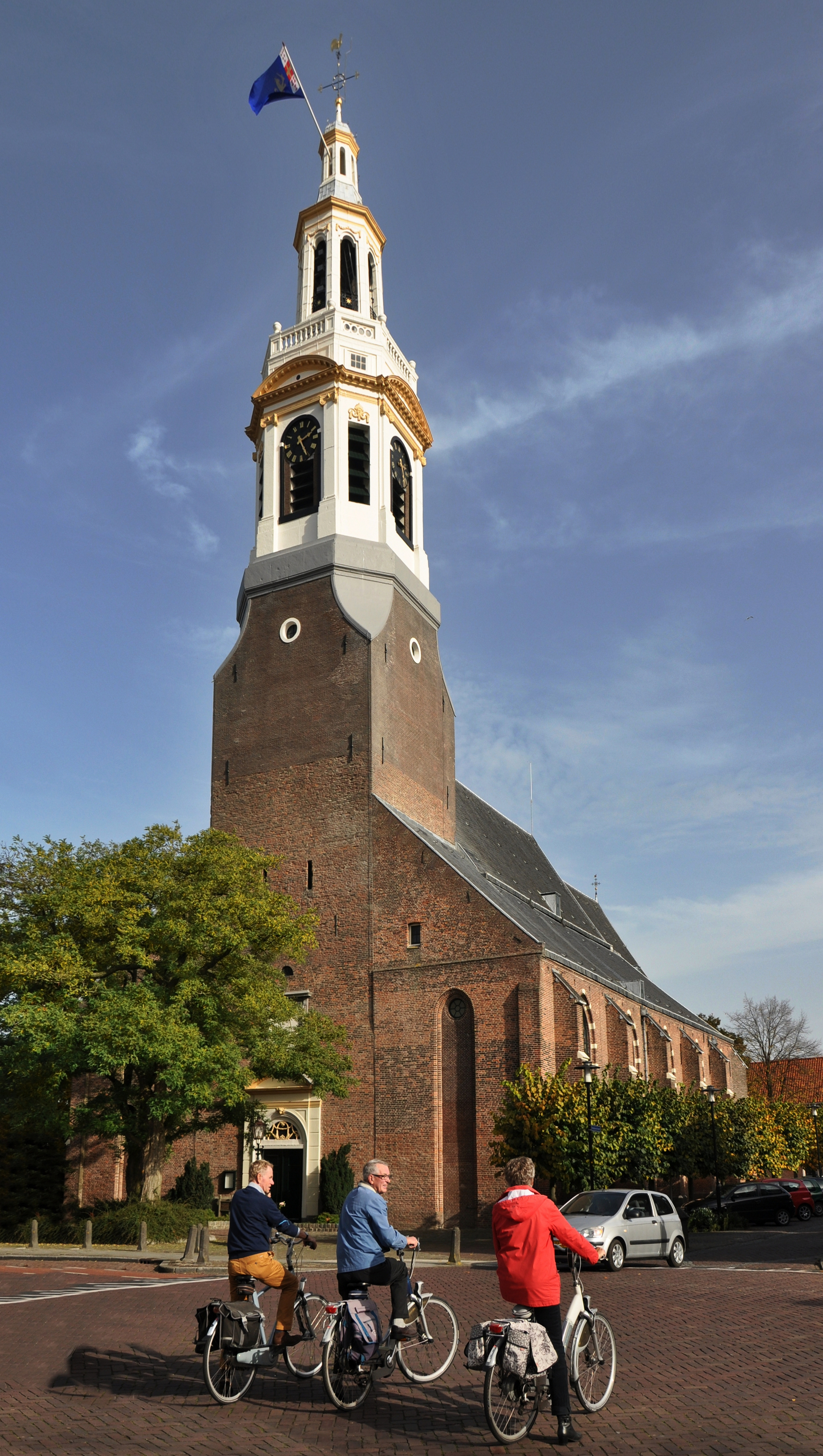
The Grote Kerk (Nijkerk)

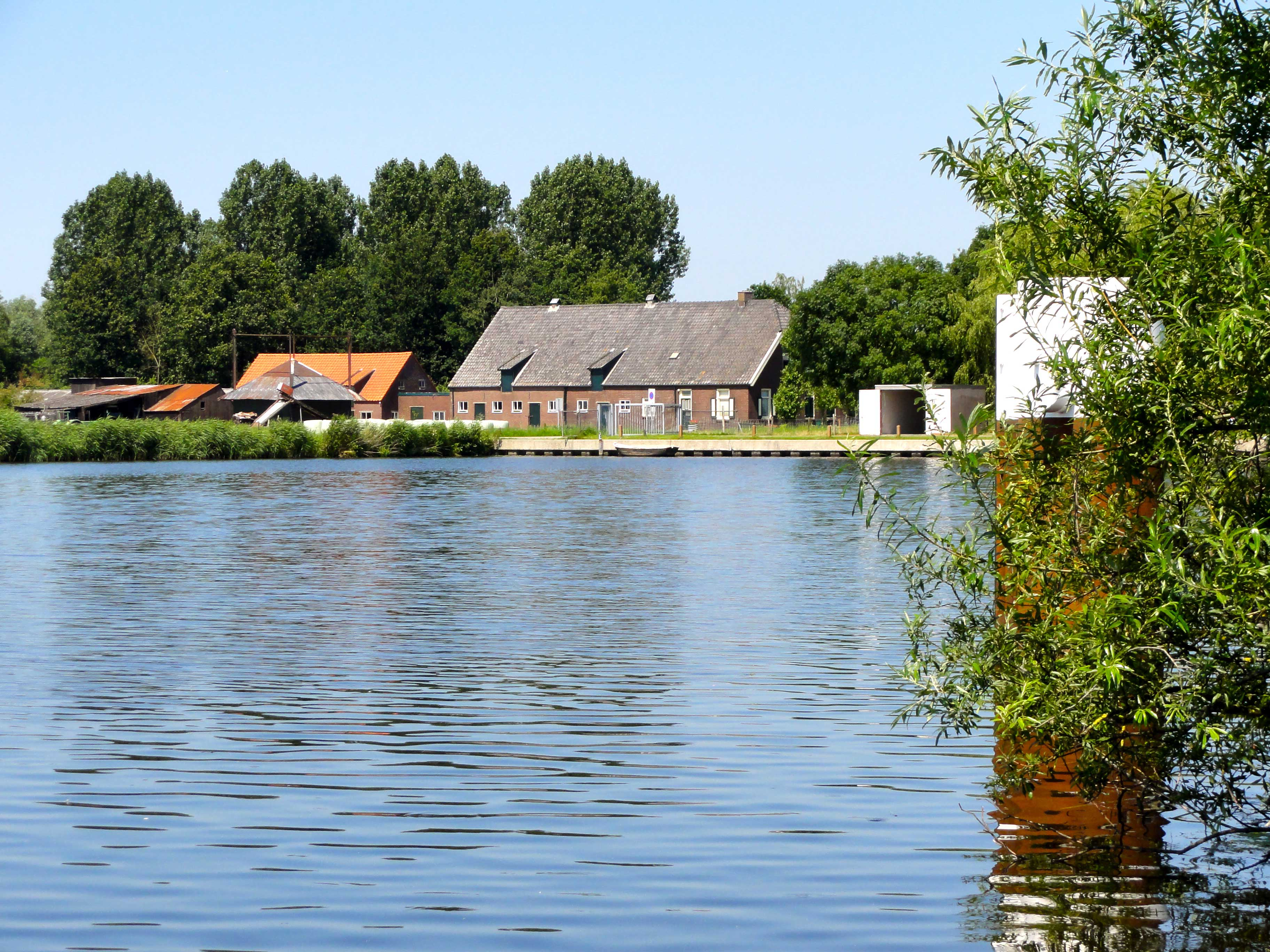
Arkervaart (canal)

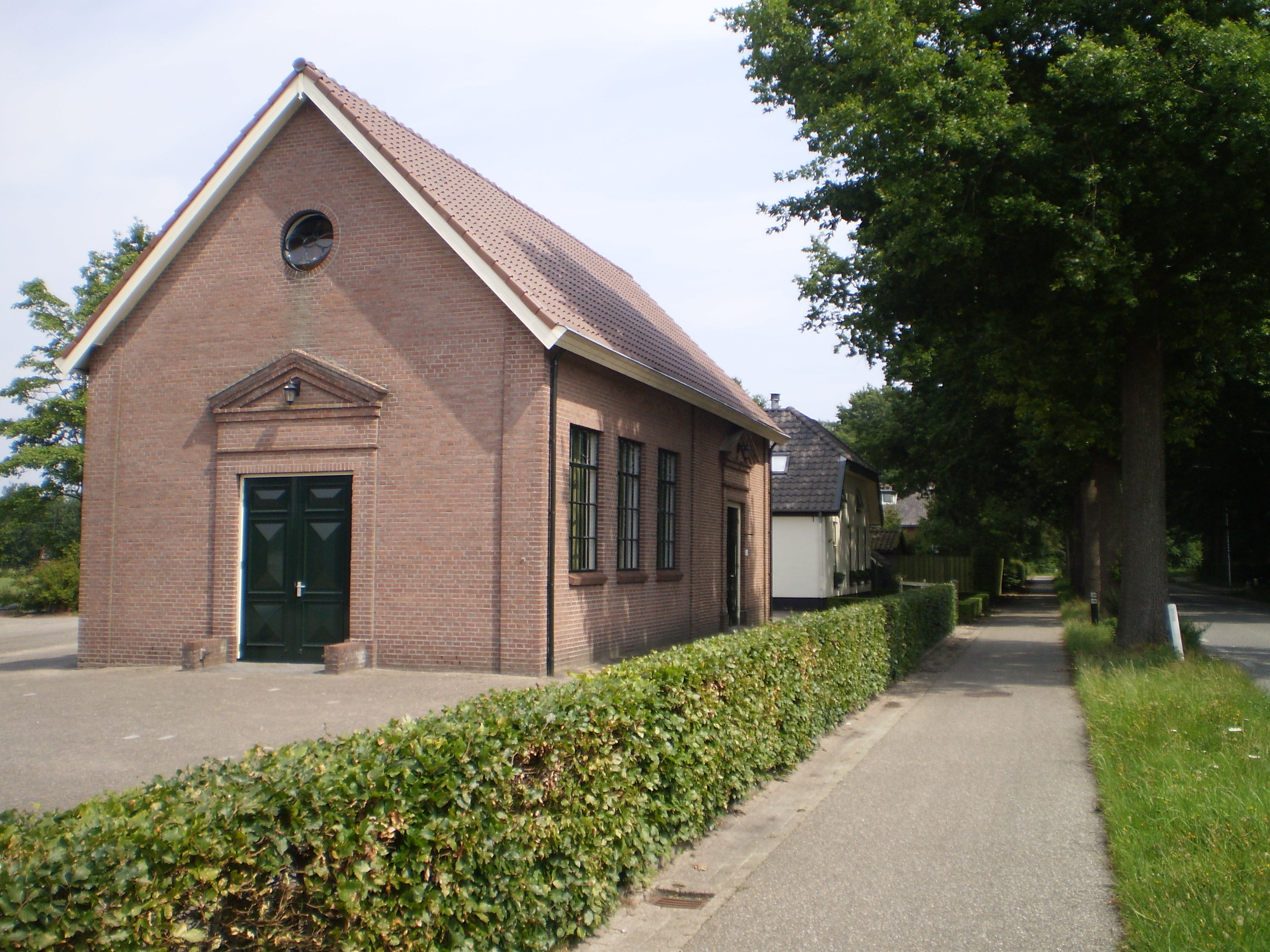
Driedorp NH-kerk

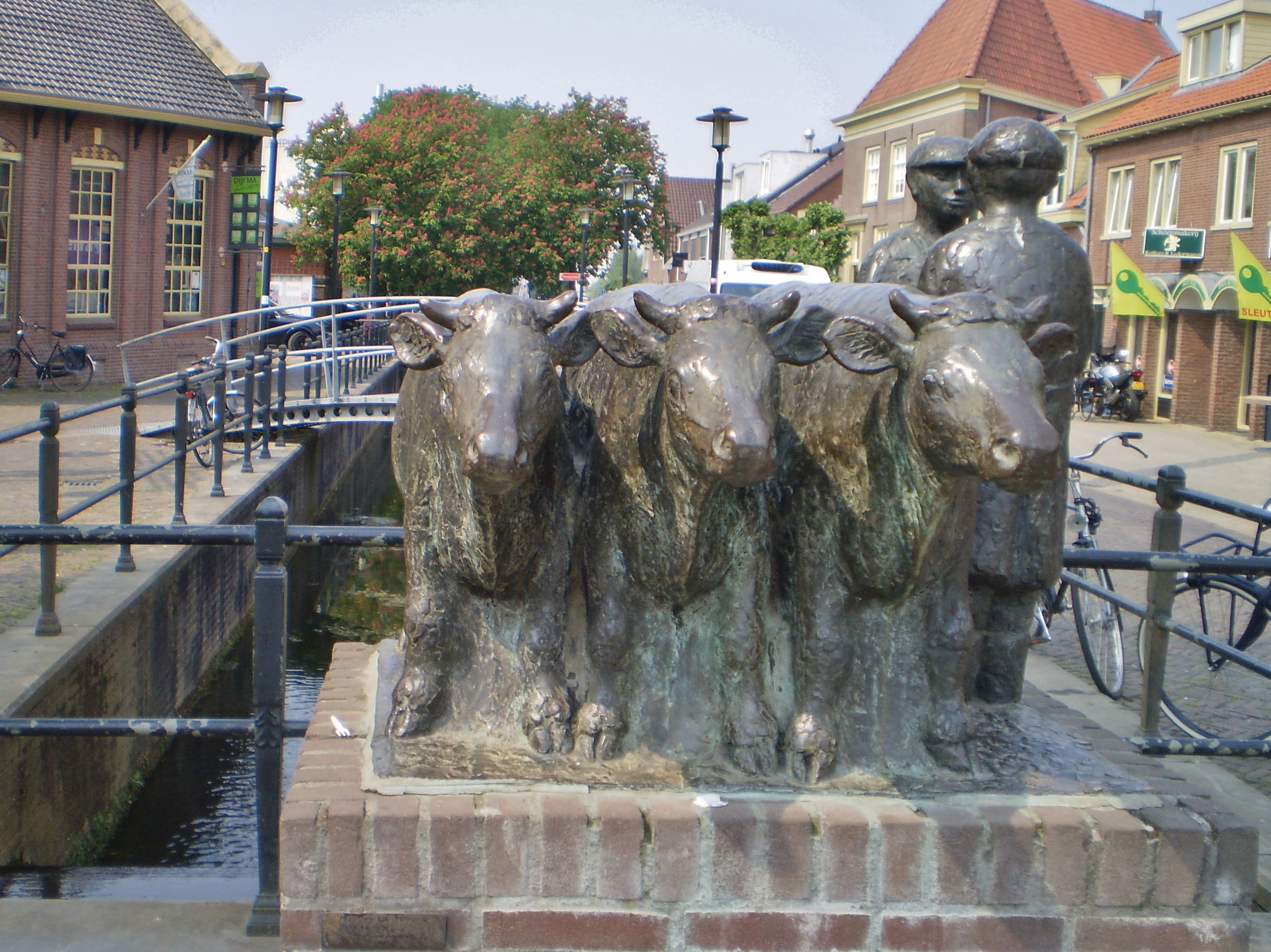
Nijkerk Trading farmers with cows

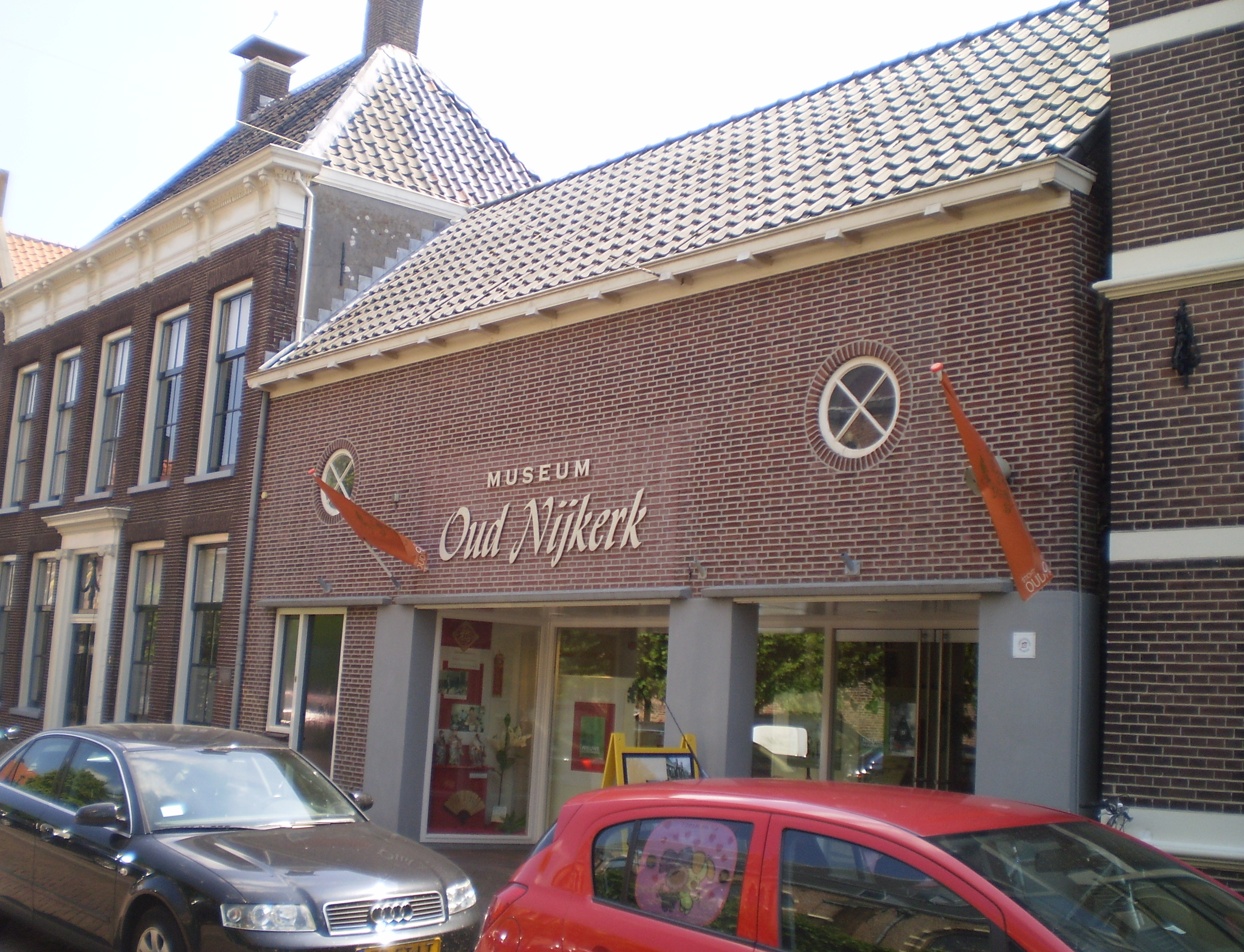
Nijkerk museum Oud Nijkerk

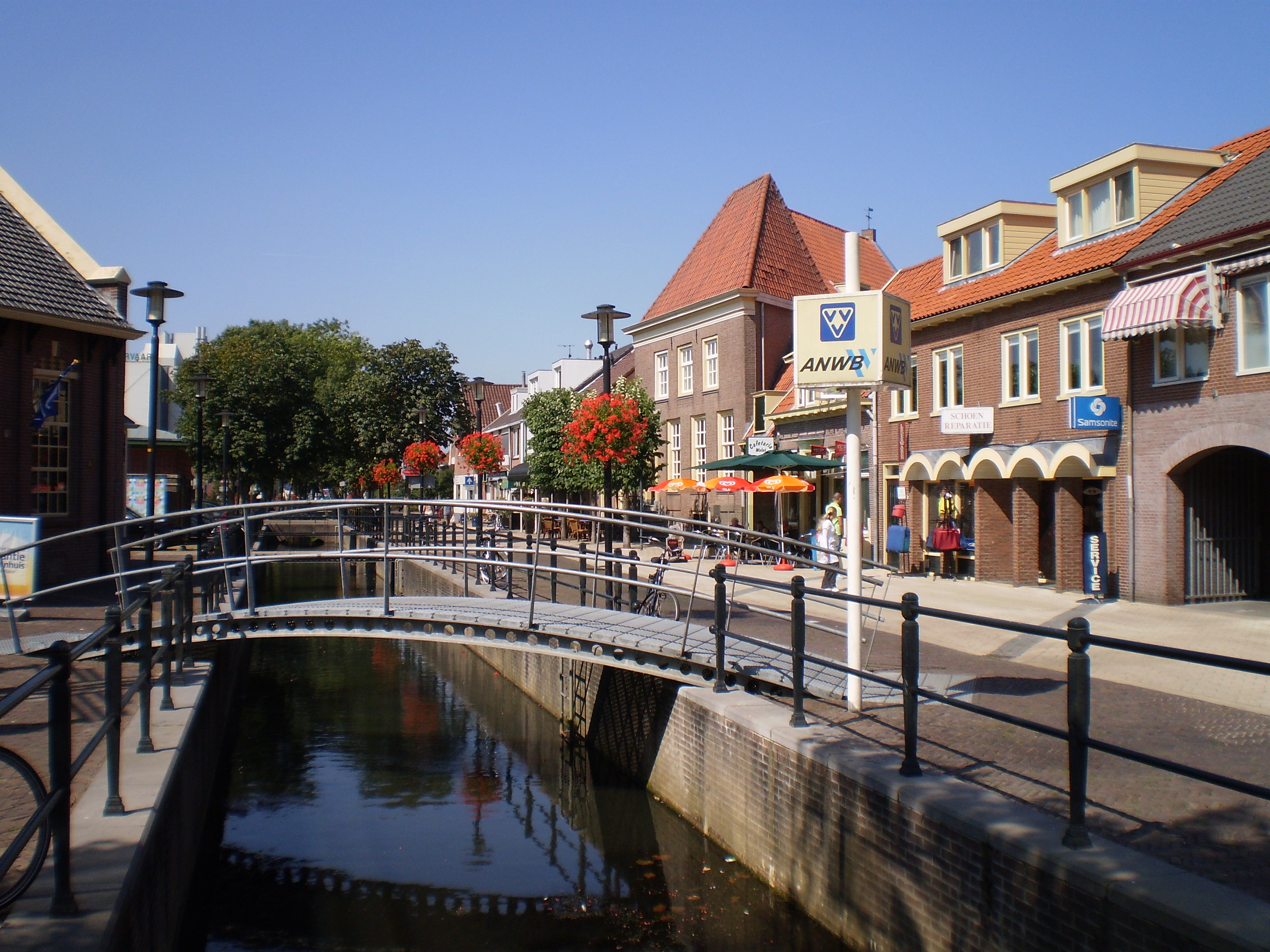
Canal in Nijkerk

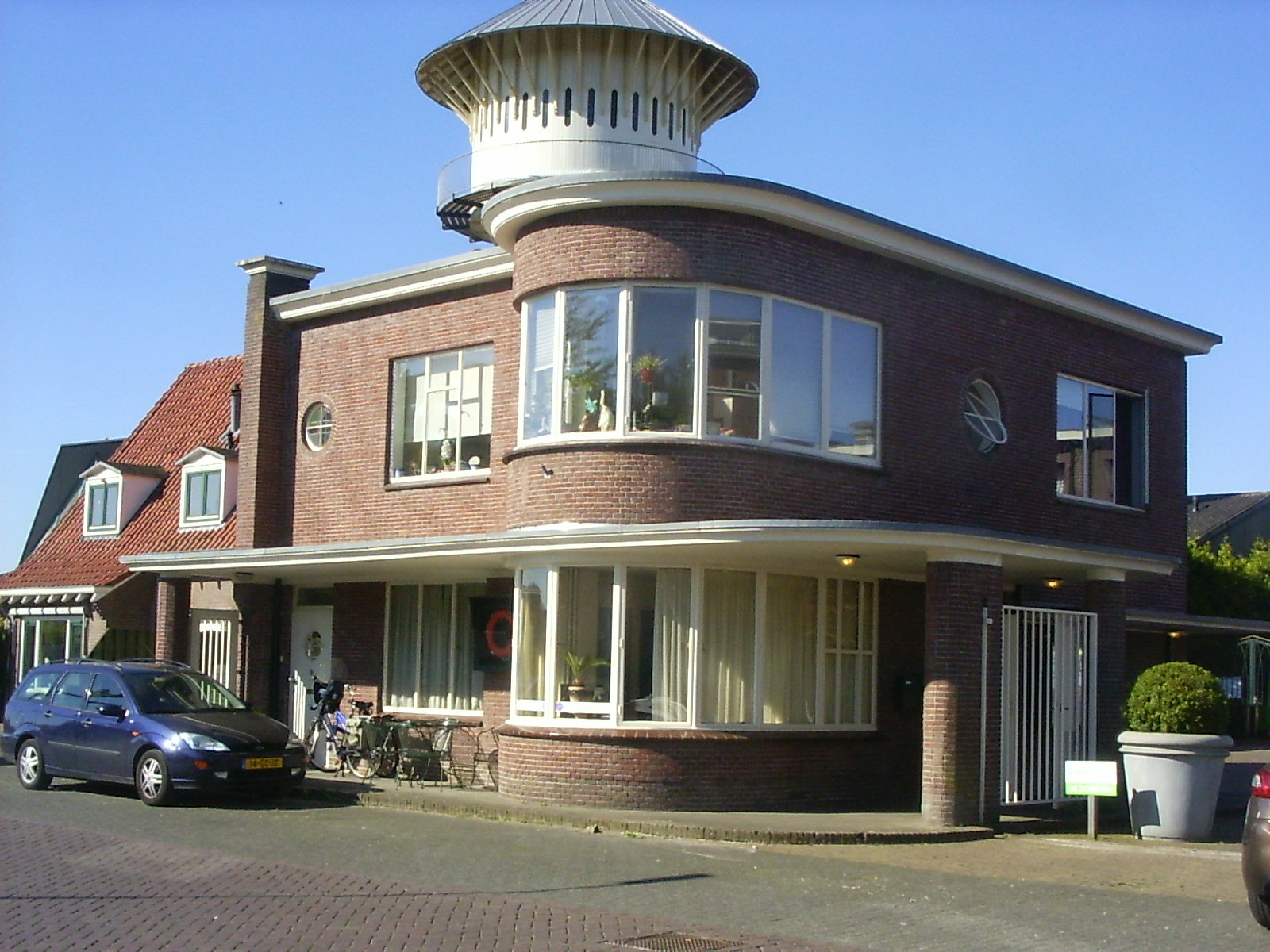
Nijkerk-westkadijk

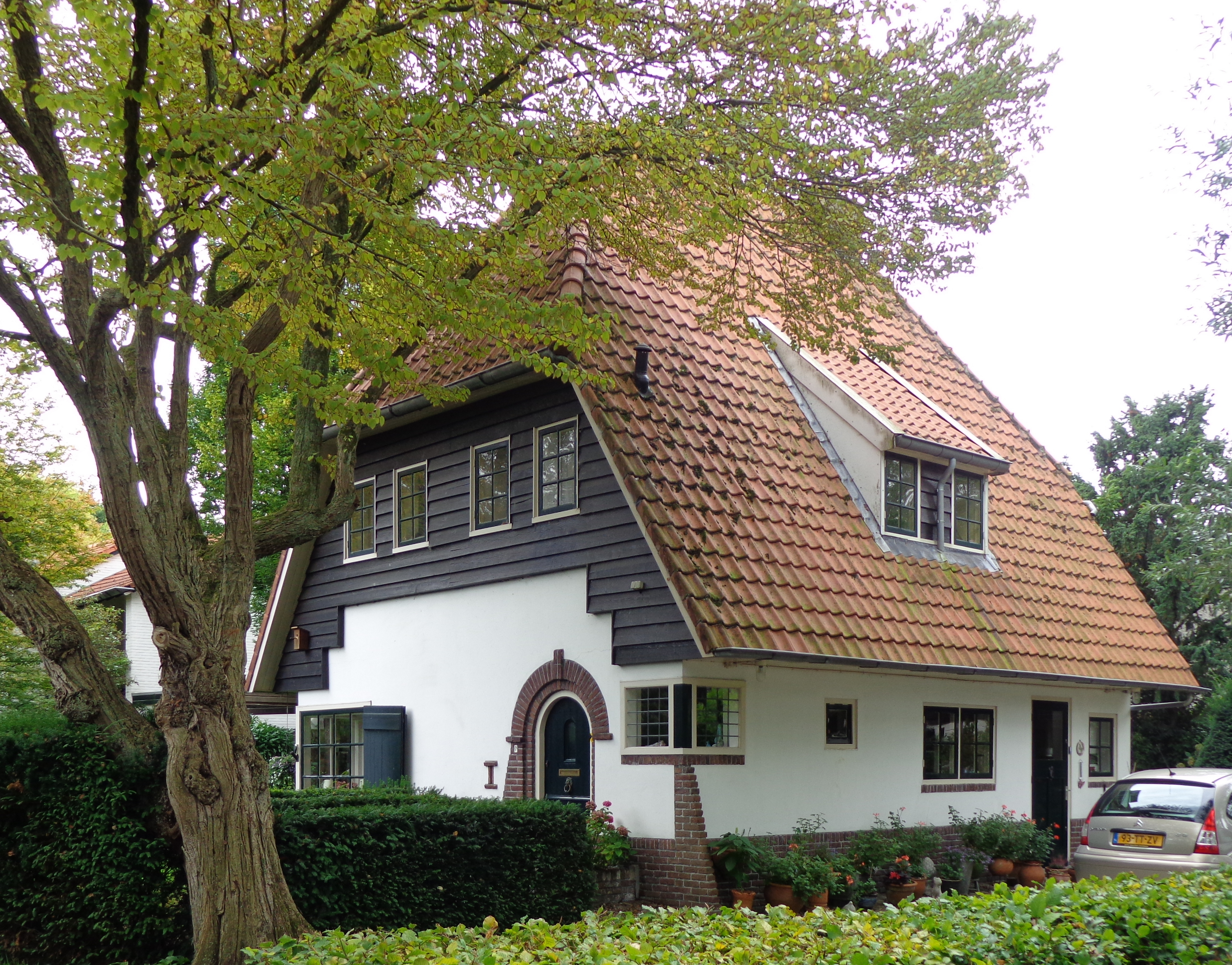
Hoevelaken Park Weldam

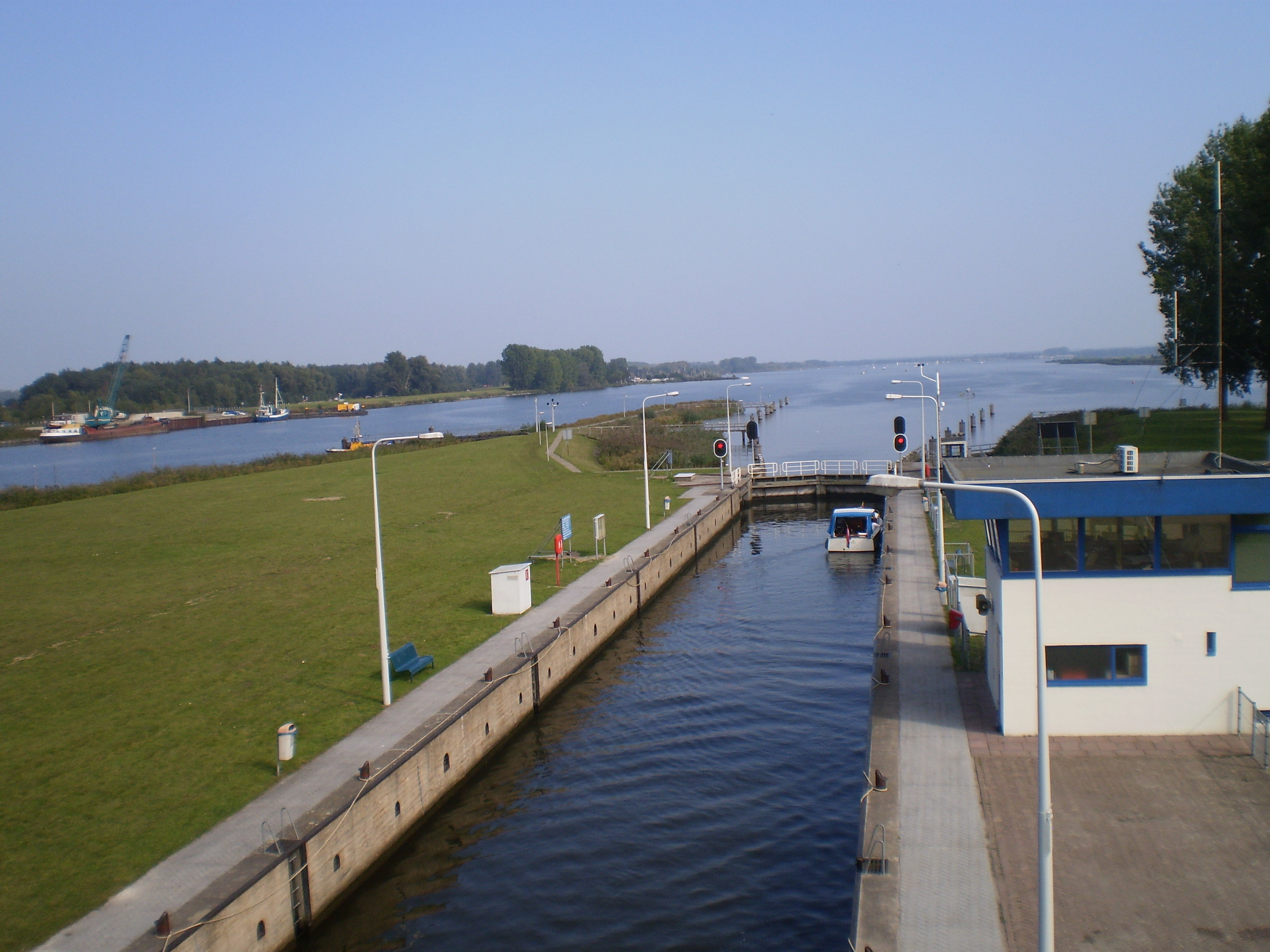
Sluice Nijkerkernau
