= Doornsteeg =

- Neighbourhood and Hamlet
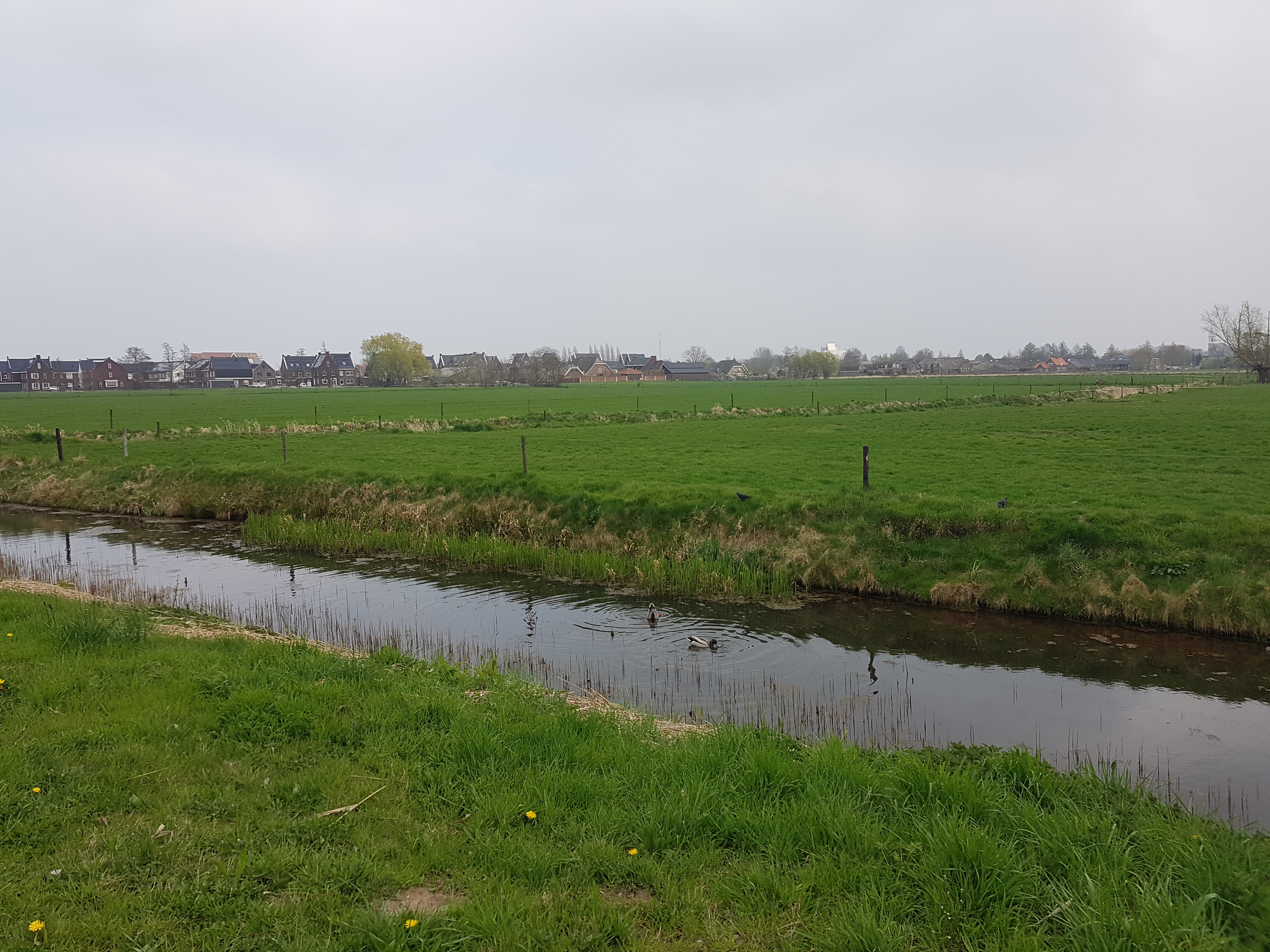
- Construction of the Doornsteeg neighbourhood

- Doornsteeg in the municipality of Nijkerk.

- Location in the province of Gelderland in the Netherlands Doornsteeg (Netherlands)
- Coordinates: 52.23027°N 5.45170°E
- Country: Netherlands
- Province: Gelderland
- Municipality: Nijkerk

Area
  - Total: 0.78 km^{2} (0.30 sq mi)
- Elevation: 2 m (6.6 ft)

Population
  - Total: 1,265
  - Density: 1,600/km^{2} (4,200/sq mi)
- Time zone: UTC+1 (CET)
  - Summer (DST): UTC+2 (CEST)
- Postal code: 3861
- Dialing code: 033

Doornsteeg is a neighbourhood of Nijkerk and a hamlet in the Dutch province of Gelderland. It is a part of the municipality of Nijkerk, and lies about 8 km northeast of Amersfoort.

It was first mentioned in 1556 as Dorenstege, and means "thorny path". The hamlet consists of about 25 houses. Since 2016, Nijkerk has started to build a new neighbourhood near the hamlet. It will consists of about 1,200 houses and cover an area of 59 hectares (150 acres).
