= Appel, Netherlands =

Appel
- Hamlet
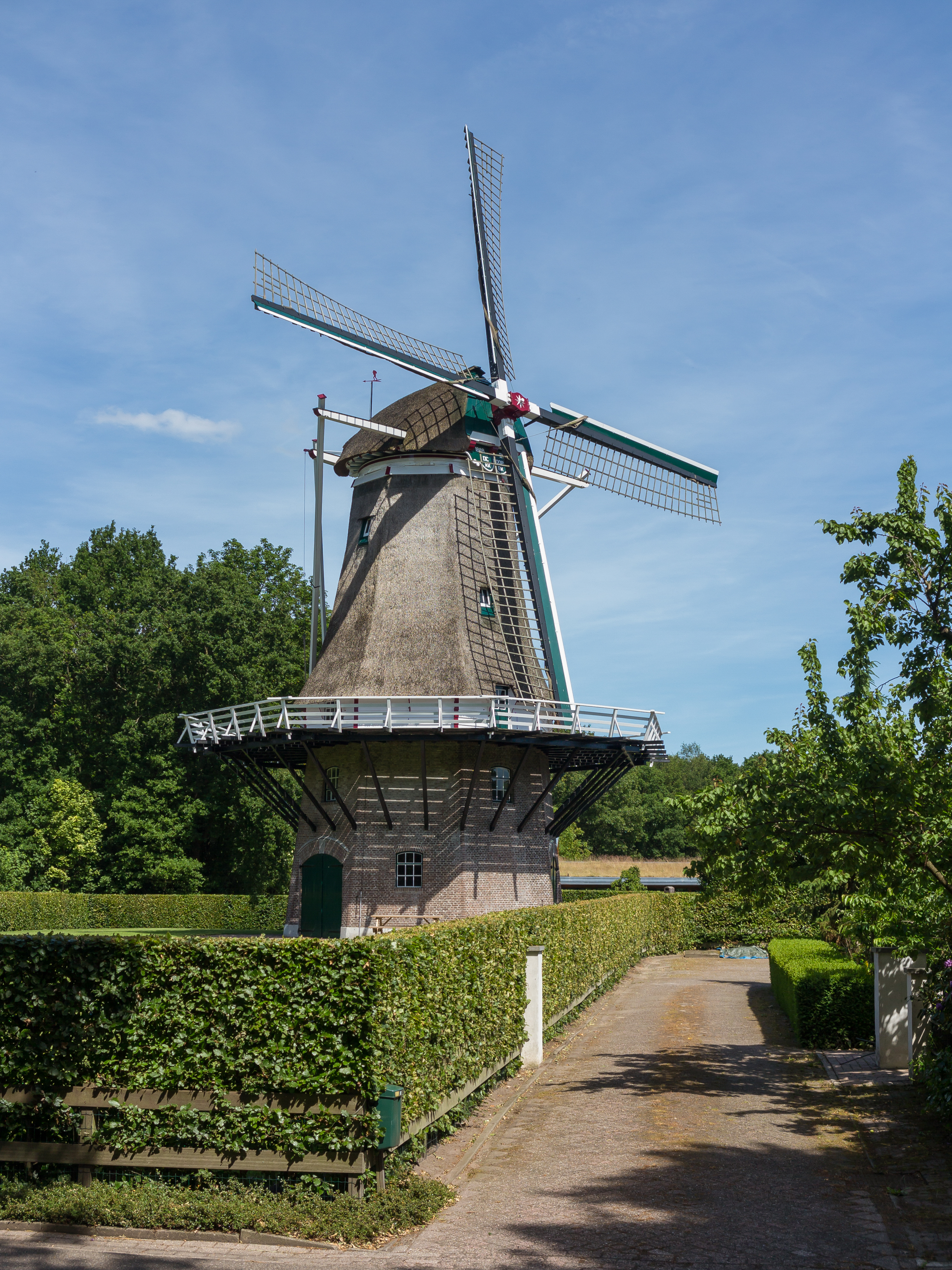
- Gristmill De Hoop

- Location in the Netherlands Appel (Netherlands)
- Coordinates: 52°11′15″N 5°32′25″E
- Country: Netherlands
- Province: Gelderland
- Municipality: Nijkerk

Area
  - Total: 10.75 km^{2} (4.15 sq mi)

Population
  - Total: 705
  - Density: 65.6/km^{2} (170/sq mi)
- Time zone: UTC+1 (CET)
  - Summer (DST): UTC+2 (CEST)
- Postal code: 3862
- Dialing code: 033

Appel (literally "apple") is a hamlet in the Dutch province of Gelderland. It is located in the municipality Nijkerk, about 6 km southeast of the city, on the border with the municipality of Barneveld.

It was first mentioned in 1146 as Appele. The etymology is unclear and may not be related to apples. The postal authorities have placed it under Nijkerk. In 1840, it was home to 318 people. The grist mill De Hoop was constructed in 1888 and was restored in 2004. In 2007, remains of a wooden castle were found near Appel which dated from around 1100. The hamlet consists of about 60 houses.

== Gallery ==
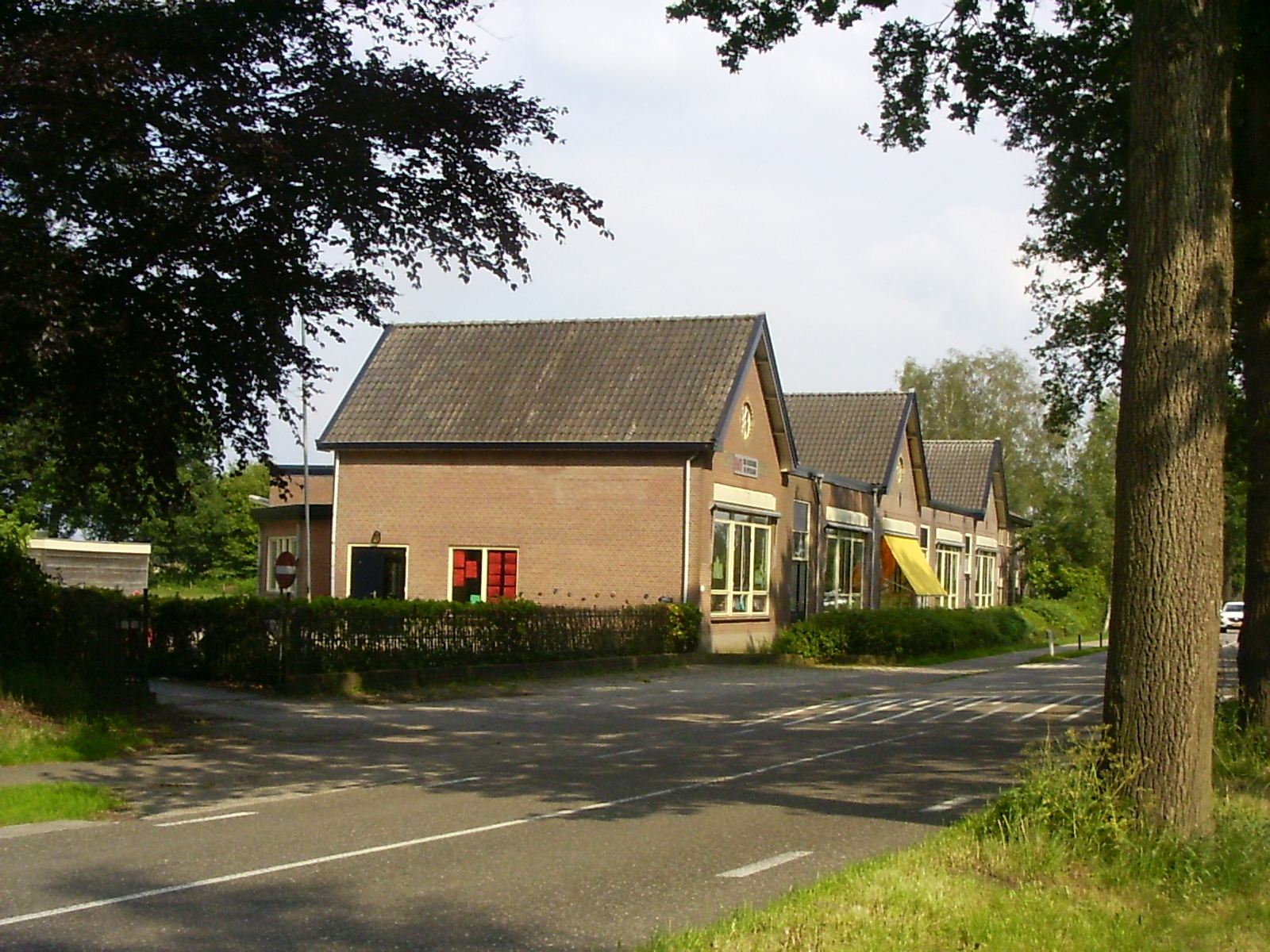
School in Appel

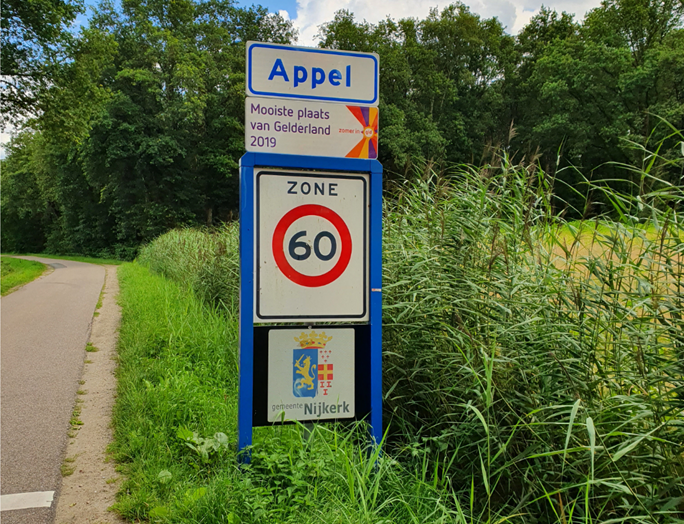
Place name sign
