= Achterhoek, Nijkerk =

Achterhoek
- Hamlet
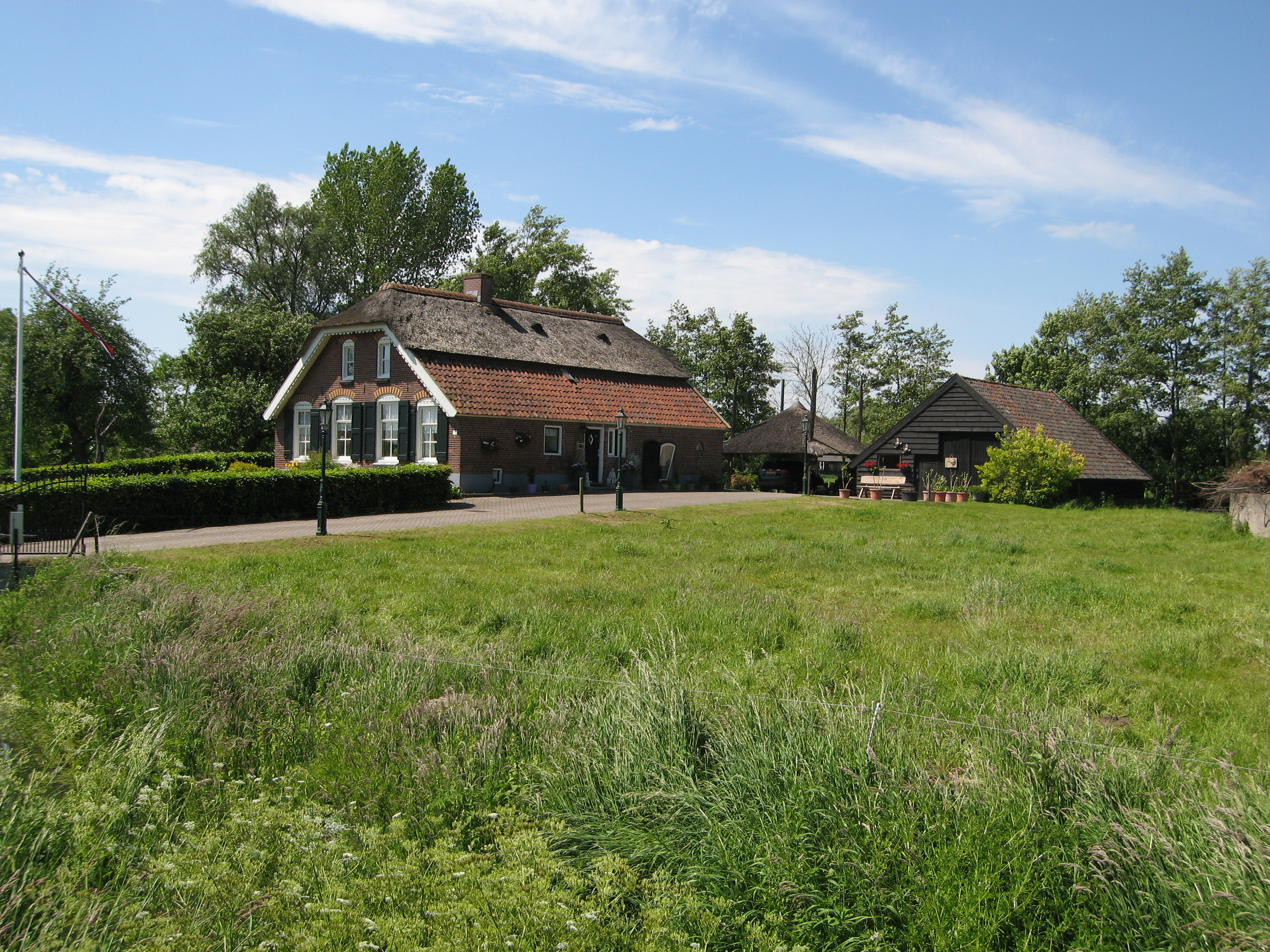
- Farm in Achterhoek

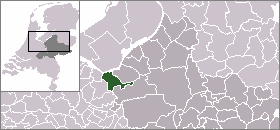

- Achterhoek in the municipality of Nijkerk.
- Coordinates: 52°13′15″N 5°24′28″E
- Country: Netherlands
- Province: Gelderland
- Municipality: Nijkerk

Area
  - Total: 5.83 km^{2} (2.25 sq mi)

Population (2021)
  - Total: 240
  - Density: 41/km^{2} (110/sq mi)
- Time zone: UTC+1 (CET)
  - Summer (DST): UTC+2 (CEST)
- Postal code: 3861
- Dialing code: 033

Achterhoek (Dutch pronunciation: [ˈɑxtərɦuk]) is a hamlet in the Dutch province of Gelderland. It is a part of the municipality of Nijkerk, and lies about 6 km north of Amersfoort.

It was first mentioned in 1608 as "in den Achterhoeck", and means "far away corner". The postal authorities have placed it under Nijkerk. It has no place name signs. In 1840, Achterhoek and De Veenhuis had a combined population of 190 people. Nowadays, Achterhoek consists of about 30 houses.
