= 't Woud =

- Hamlet
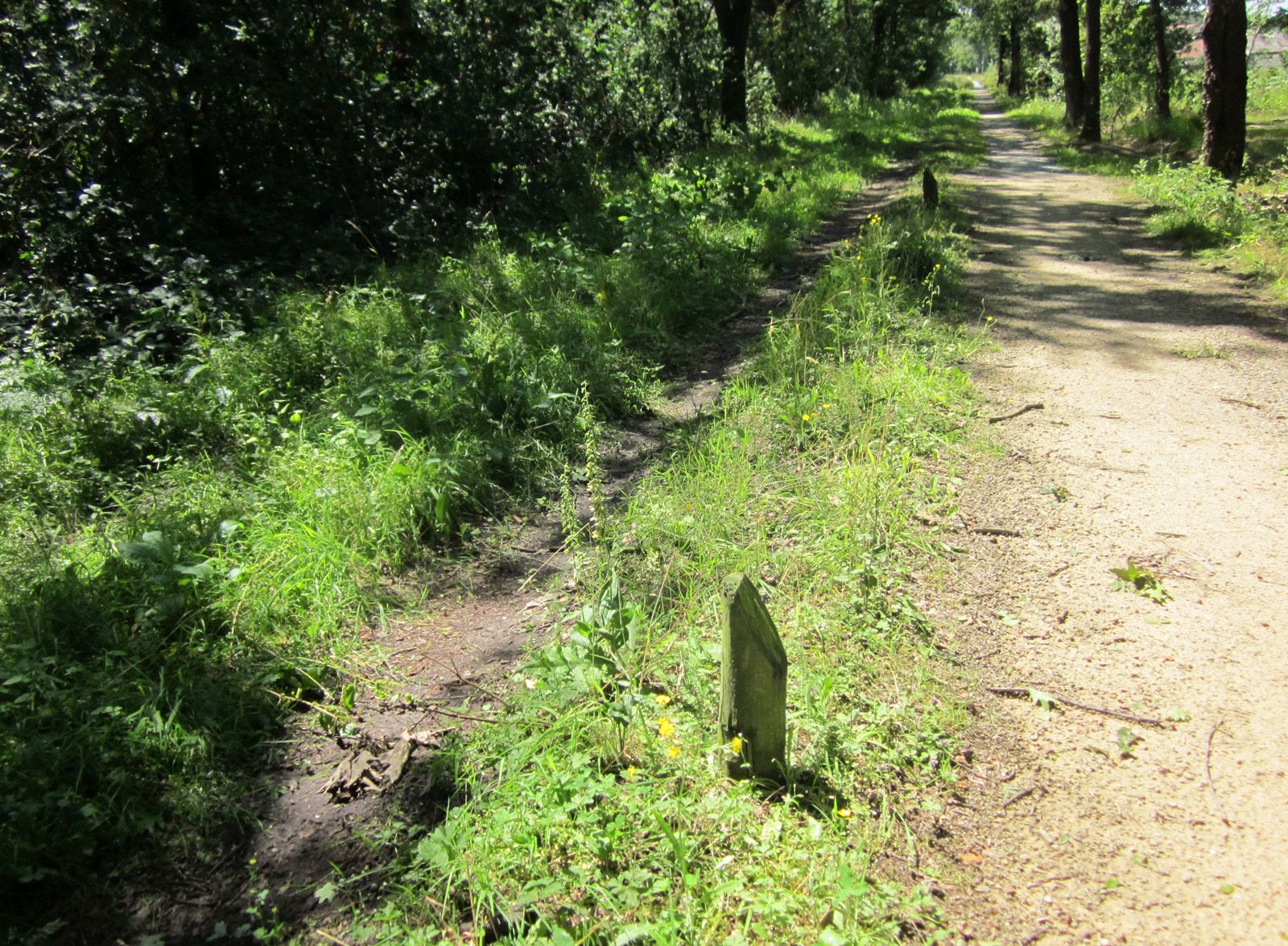
- Woudweg

- The village (dark red) and the statistical district (light green) of 't Woud in the municipality of Nijkerk.

- Location in the province of Gelderland in the Netherlands 't Woud (Netherlands)
- Coordinates: 52.1955°N 5.5554°E
- Country: Netherlands
- Province: Gelderland
- Municipality: Nijkerk

Area
  - Total: 10.75 km^{2} (4.15 sq mi)

Population
  - Total: 705
  - Density: 65.6/km^{2} (170/sq mi)
- Time zone: UTC+1 (CET)
  - Summer (DST): UTC+2 (CEST)
- Postal code: 3862
- Dialing code: 033

't Woud is a hamlet in the Dutch province of Gelderland. It is a part of the municipality of Nijkerk, and lies about 12 km east of Amersfoort.

't Woud was founded by farmers at the beginning of the 20th century. After they had made the soil ready for farming they expanded their operations for decades. Nowadays only a few large farming companies are left. The other inhabitants are merely people who love living on the countryside.

It was first mentioned between 1830 and 1855 as 't Woud, and means wood. The postal authorities have placed it under Nijkerk. There are no place name signs, and the hamlet consists of about 30 houses.
