= Kruishaar =

- Hamlet
- Kruishaar in the municipality of Nijkerk.

- Location in the province of Gelderland in the Netherlands Kruishaar (Netherlands)
- Coordinates: 52.20101°N 5.54022°E
- Country: Netherlands
- Province: Gelderland
- Municipality: Nijkerk; Putten

Area
  - Total: 5.35 km^{2} (2.07 sq mi)

Population (2021)
  - Total: 340
  - Density: 64/km^{2} (160/sq mi)
- Time zone: UTC+1 (CET)
  - Summer (DST): UTC+2 (CEST)
- Postal code: 3862
- Dialing code: 033

Kruishaar is a hamlet in the Dutch province of Gelderland. It is a part of the municipality of Nijkerk, and lies about 11 km east of Amersfoort. A small part belongs to the municipality of Putten.

It was first mentioned in 1560 as Cruyshaer, and means "sandy ridge with a cross sign". The postal authorities have placed it under Nijkerk. There are no place name signs. There are about 70 living vans in Kruishaar.
