= Kees de Kort =

Dutch artist (1934–2022)

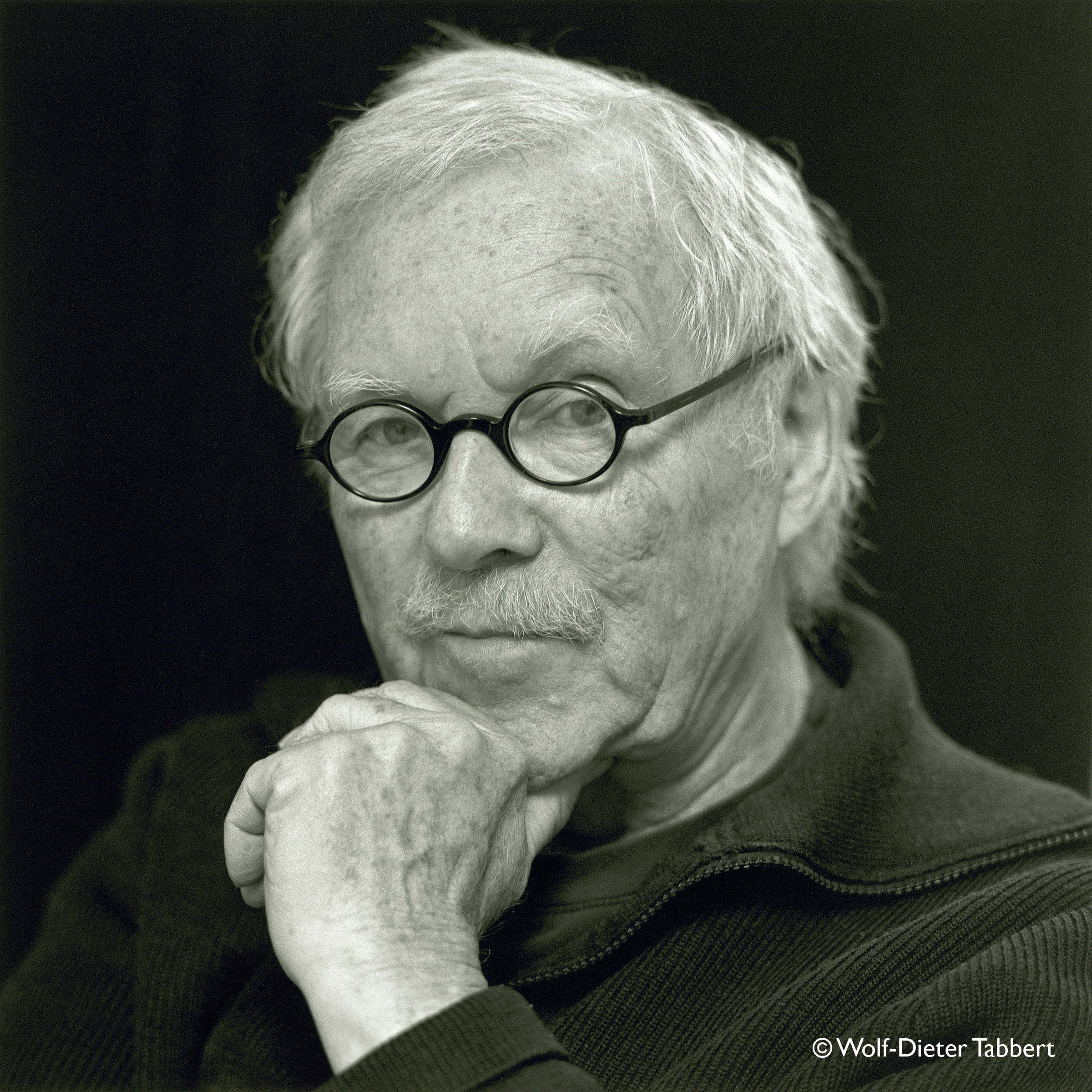
- Kees de Kort in 2015
- Born: 2 December 1934; Nijkerk, Gelderland, Netherlands
- Died: August 19, 2022 (aged 87); Bergen, North Holland, Netherlands

Kees de Kort (2 December 1934 - 19 August 2022) was a Dutch artist best known for his illustrations of Bible scenes for children's books.

== Life ==
De Kort studied at the Art Academy of Amersfoort, at the Art School of Utrecht and at the Imperial Academy of Fine Arts in Amsterdam. At age 27, de Kort worked as a technical drafter but grew bored of his work after three years.

De Kort first created Bible illustrations for the public television station "schulfunk". In 1965 the Dutch Bible Society commissioned him to illustrate a number of biblical stories for people with learning disabilities. This led in 1967 to the series called What the Bible says - a series of small picture books, each containing one Bible story. The text was written in simple words, always limited to a few short sentences per page. De Kort developed a distinctive pictorial style for his illustrations, with vivid characters and bright colors. It is said that his pictures appeal to both children and adults, without slipping into kitsch.

The Bible books were published in 65 countries and translated into many languages.

In 1992, De Kort compiled these books into a larger work, the Kijkbijbel ("Look-Bible"), which has been published in translation under several titles.

De Kort also drew illustrations of Bible stories for adults (the subjects include the Book of Amos, the Book of Job and the Song of Songs). He also created stained glass windows and triptychs with religious subjects. Later in life, he focused on painting pigs as they reminded him of childhood.

De Kort lived in Bergen, North Holland, was married, and has two sons who are also artists.

== Works ==
=== What the Bible Tells Us ===
The following titles comprise the "What the Bible Tells Us" series, published by The Bible Societies in the U.K. and by the Augsburg Publishing House in the U.S.:

Old Testament stories:

- In the Beginning
- Noah
- Abraham
- Jacob and Esau
- Joseph
- Moses
- On the Way to the Promised Land
- Ruth
- David
- Jonah

New Testament stories:

- A Baby Called John
- Jesus is Born
- Jesus Goes to Jerusalem (the twelve-year-old Jesus)
- Jesus at the Wedding
- Jesus and His Disciples (first encounters with the disciples)
- Jesus Heals a Sick Man
- Jesus and the Storm
- Jesus Conquers Death
- Jesus and a Little Girl
- Jesus Heals a Blind Man (Bartimaeus)
- Zacchaeus
- The Good Samaritan
- The Son Who Left Home
- The Workers in the Vineyard
- Jesus at the Passover (Jesus enters Jerusalem, the Last Supper)
- Jesus is Alive (a.k.a. Jesus is Risen; Gethsemane, Pilate, the crucifixion, the empty tomb, first resurrection appearances)
- Jesus Goes Away (the ascension, Pentecost)
- A Man is Baptized (the first gentile convert)

=== Other books ===
- Kees de Kort, Kijkbijbel ("Look-Bible"), Haarlem: Bijbelgenootschap, 1992
- Das grosse Bibel-Bilderbuch, Gemalt von Kees de Kort ("The Big Bible Picture-Book, Painted by Kees de Kort"), Stuttgart, Deutsche Bibelgesellschaft, 1998
- Imgard Weth, The Neukirchen Children's Bible, illustrated by Kees de Kort
- Imgard Weth, 7 x 7 Bible Stories (an abridgement of the Neukirchen Children's Bible)
- Imgard Weth, The New Illustrated Children's Bible, Edinburgh, Saint Andrew Press, 2008 (another translation of 7 x 7 Bible Stories)
