= Slichtenhorst =

- Hamlet
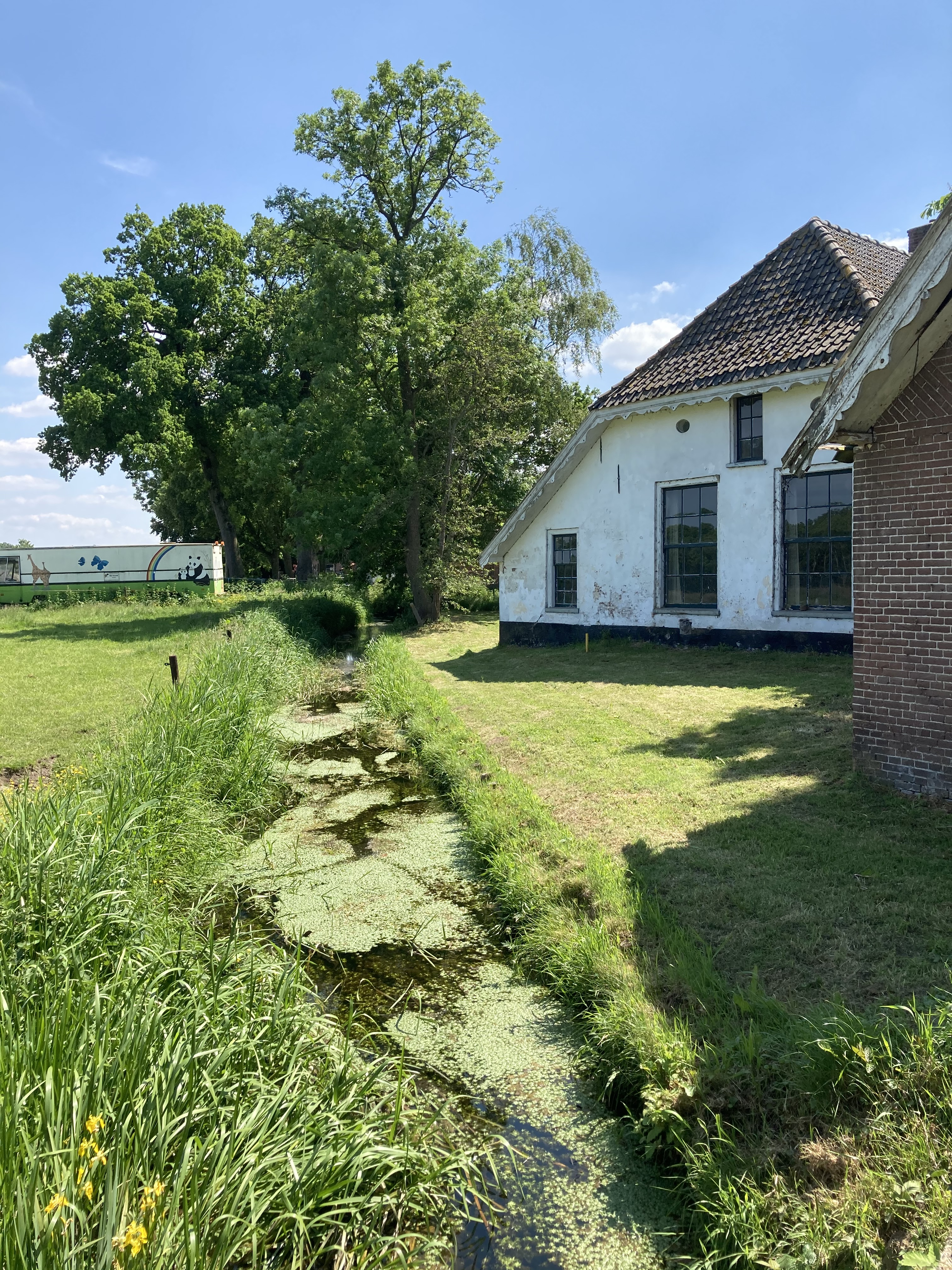
- Farm in Slichtenhorst

- Slichtenhorst in the municipality of Nijkerk.

- Location in the province of Gelderland in the Netherlands Slichtenhorst (Netherlands)
- Coordinates: 52.20442°N 5.49079°E
- Country: Netherlands
- Province: Gelderland
- Municipality: Nijkerk

Area
  - Total: 8.25 km^{2} (3.19 sq mi)

Population (2021)
  - Total: 470
  - Density: 57/km^{2} (150/sq mi)
- Time zone: UTC+1 (CET)
  - Summer (DST): UTC+2 (CEST)
- Postal code: 3862
- Dialing code: 033

Slichtenhorst is a hamlet in the Dutch province of Gelderland. It is a part of the municipality of Nijkerk, and lies about 8 km east of Amersfoort.

It was first mentioned in 1434 as Slichterhorst, and means "flat height with growth". The postal authorities have placed it under Nijkerk. The land around Slichtenhorst used to be owned by the Abdinckhof monastery in Paderborn. In 1803, during the French occupation, the land was confiscated by the State and sold to Dutch farmers. In 1840, Slichtenhorst was home to 423 people.
