= Holk =

- Hamlet
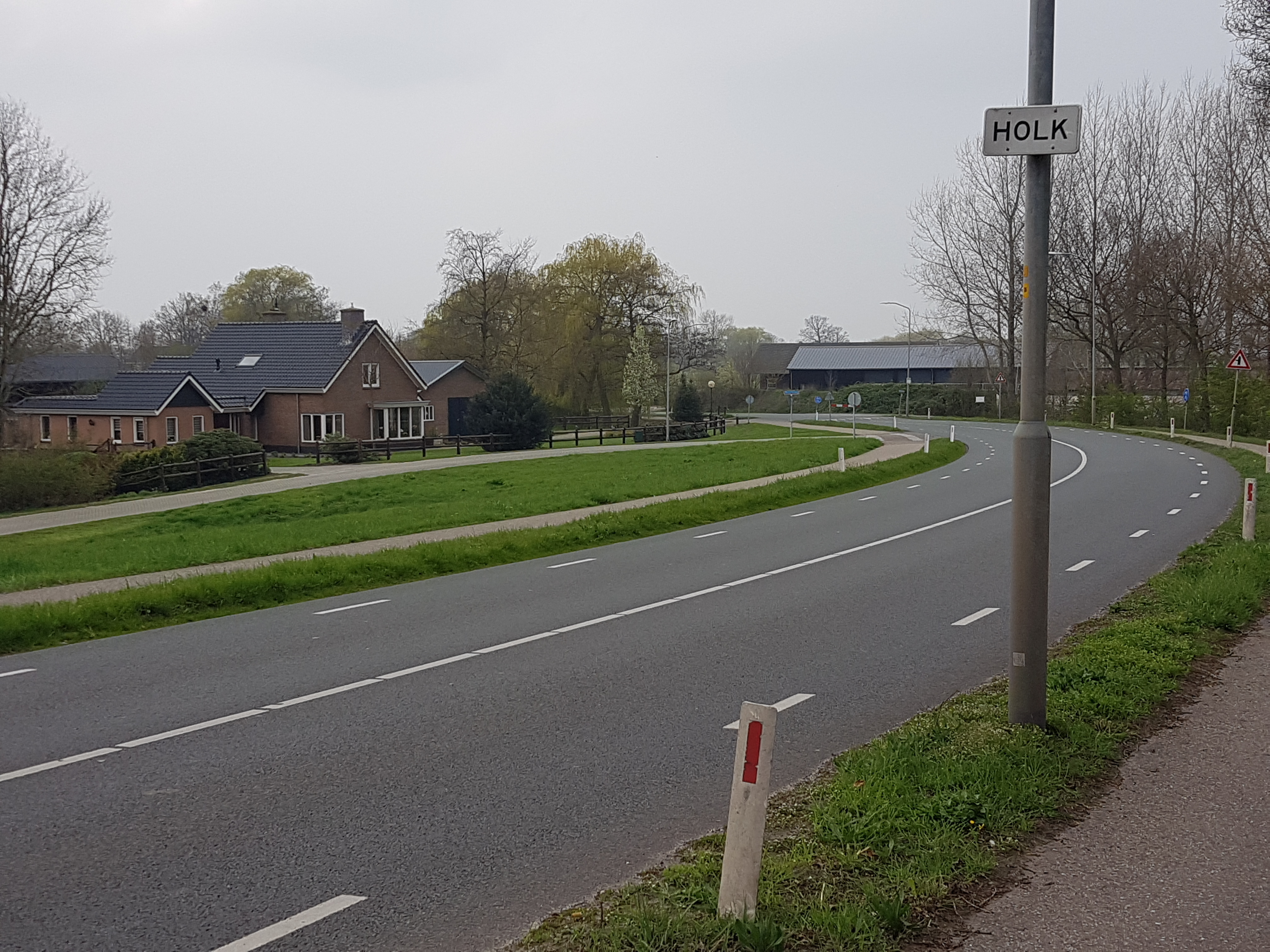

- Holk in the municipality of Nijkerk.

- Location in the province of Gelderland in the Netherlands Holk (Netherlands)
- Coordinates: 52°13′N 5°27′E
- Country: Netherlands
- Province: Gelderland
- Municipality: Nijkerk
- Time zone: UTC+1 (CET)
  - Summer (DST): UTC+2 (CEST)
- Postal code: 3861
- Dialing code: 033

Holk is a hamlet in the Dutch province of Gelderland. It is a part of the municipality of Nijkerk, and lies about 7 km northeast of Amersfoort.

It was first mentioned around 1325 as Hollic, and means "low lying neighbourhood". Holk is not a statistical entity, and the postal authorities have placed it under Nijkerk. In 1840, it was home to 204 people. Since 2012, it has place name signs.
