= Nekkeveld =

- Hamlet
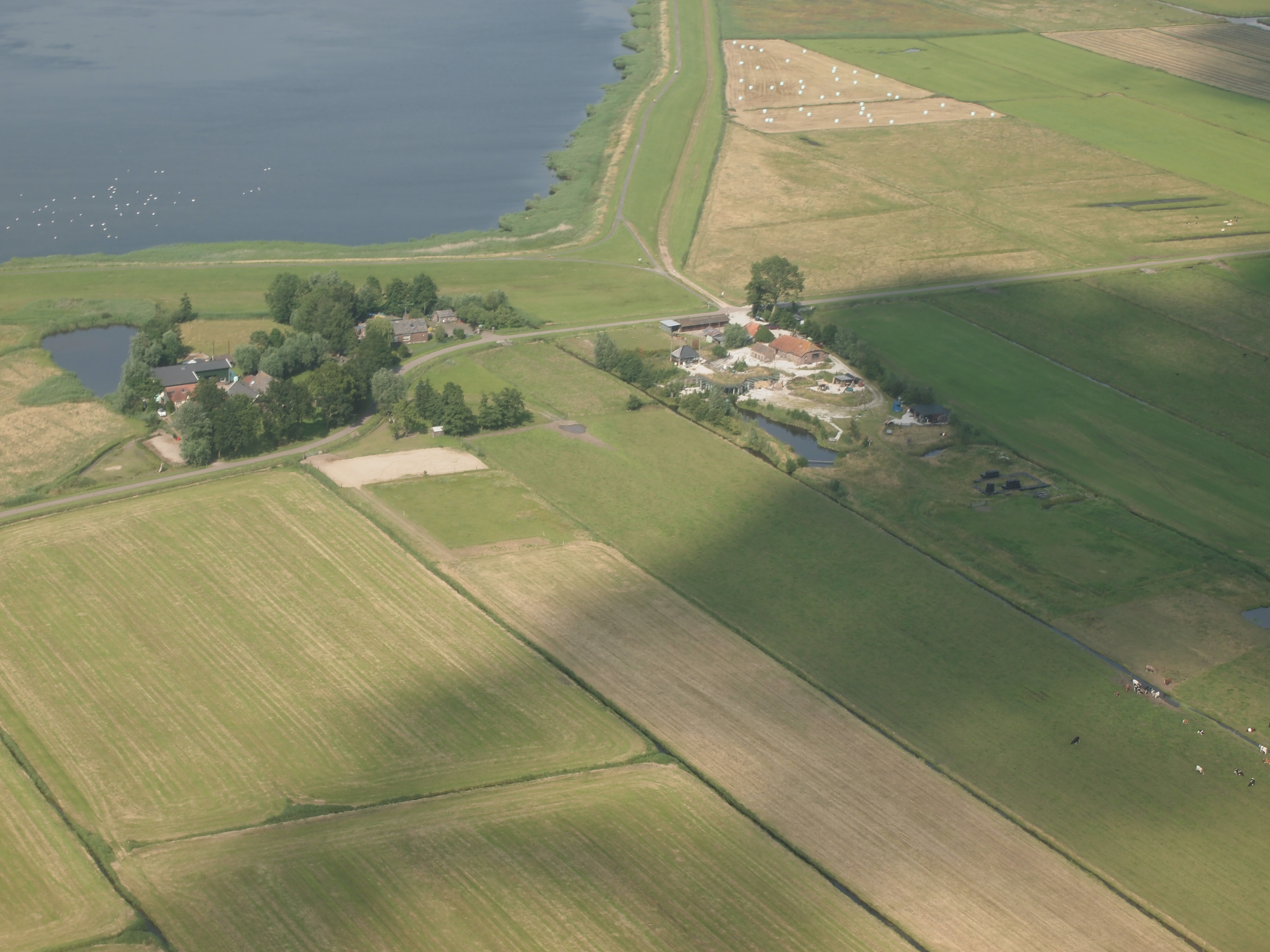
- Aerial view of Nekkeveld

- Nekkeveld in the municipality of Nijkerk.

- Location in the province of Gelderland in the Netherlands Nekkeveld (Netherlands)
- Coordinates: 52°14′40″N 5°25′10″E
- Country: Netherlands
- Province: Gelderland
- Municipality: Nijkerk
- Time zone: UTC+1 (CET)
  - Summer (DST): UTC+2 (CEST)
- Postal code: 3861
- Dialing code: 033

Nekkeveld is a hamlet in the Dutch province of Gelderland. It is a part of the municipality of Nijkerk, and lies about 8 km north of Amersfoort.

Nekkeveld is not a statistical entity, and the postal authorities have placed it under Nijkerk. It was first mentioned in 1250 as "in Ekelenvelde", and means field with oak trees. There are no official place name signs, however a farmer has put a sign in its driveway. Nekkeveld consists of about 7 houses.

== Gallery ==
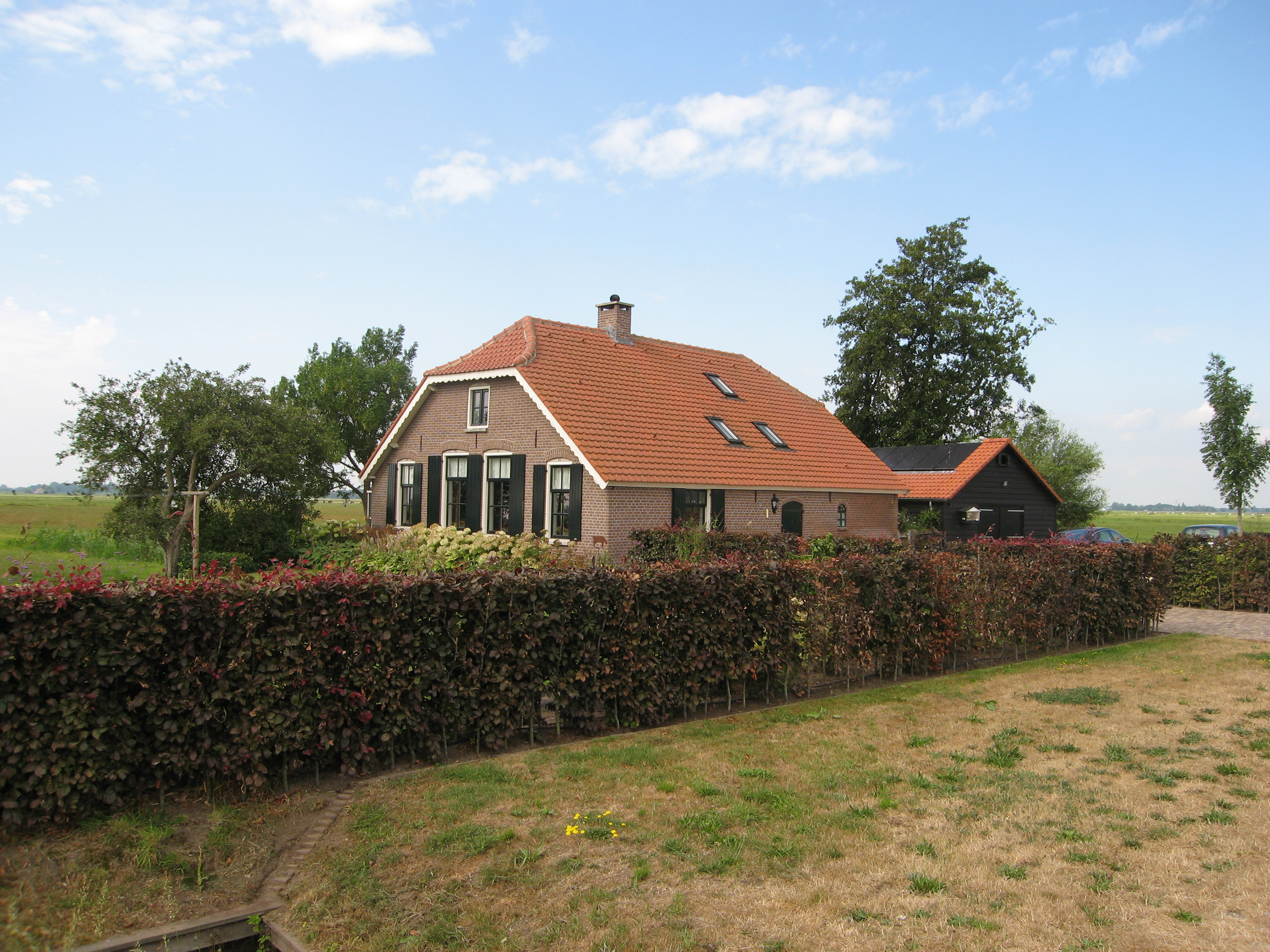
Farm at Nekkeveld

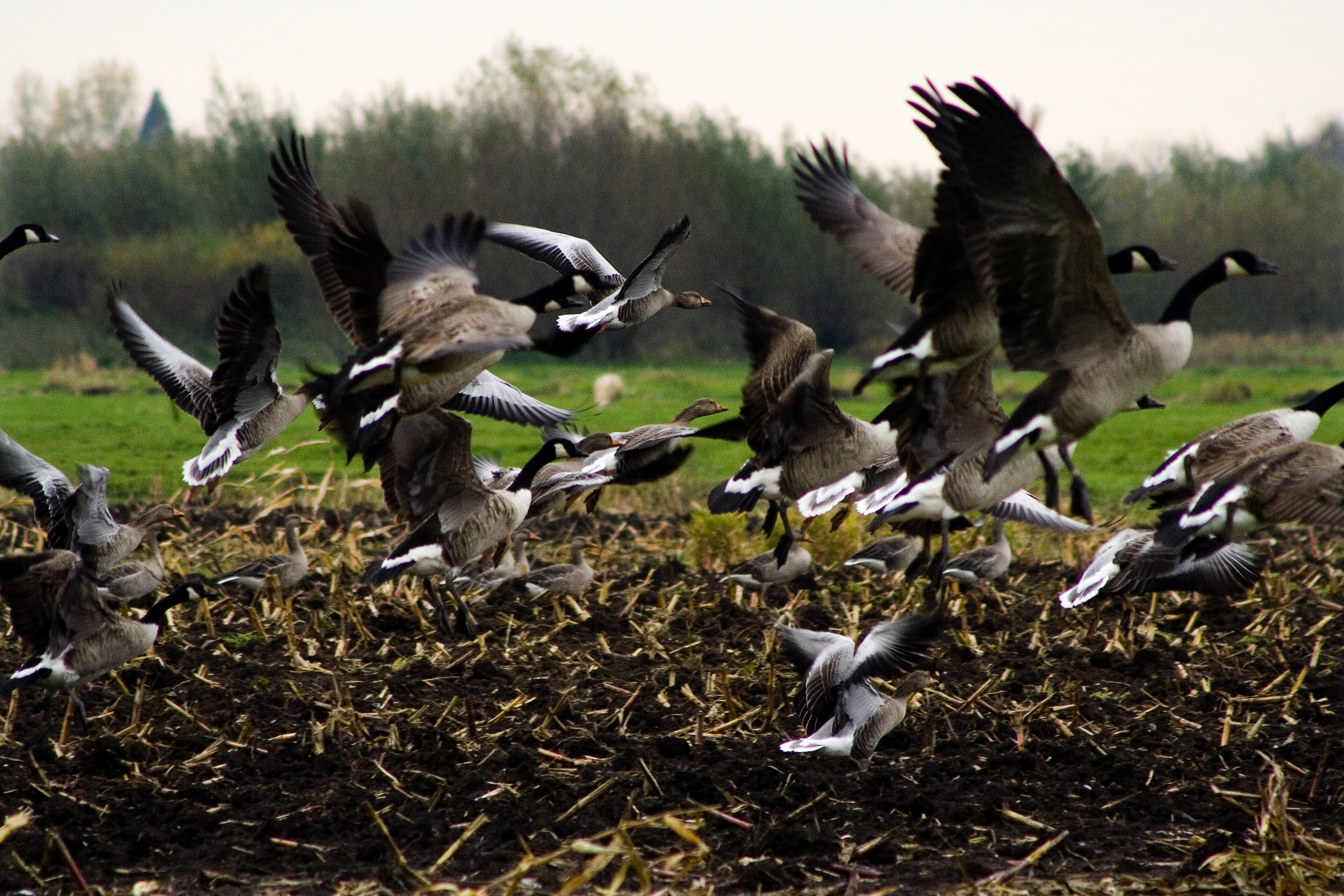
Geese in Nekkeveld
