= De Veenhuis =

- Hamlet
- De Veenhuis in the municipality of Nijkerk.

- Location in the province of Gelderland in the Netherlands De Veenhuis (Netherlands)
- Coordinates: 52.21807°N 5.42866°E
- Country: Netherlands
- Province: Gelderland
- Municipality: Nijkerk

Area
  - Total: 5.83 km^{2} (2.25 sq mi)

Population
  - Total: 240
  - Density: 41/km^{2} (110/sq mi)
- Time zone: UTC+1 (CET)
  - Summer (DST): UTC+2 (CEST)
- Postal code: 3861
- Dialing code: 033

De Veenhuis is a hamlet in the Dutch province of Gelderland. It is a part of the municipality of Nijkerk, and lies about 6 km north of Amersfoort.

It was first mentioned in 1453 as "op Veenhusen", and means "houses on the moorland". The postal authorities have placed it under Nijkerk. In 1840, it was home to 190 people. De Veenhuis has no place name signs, and nowadays consists of about 10 houses.
