= Eefsele =

- Hamlet
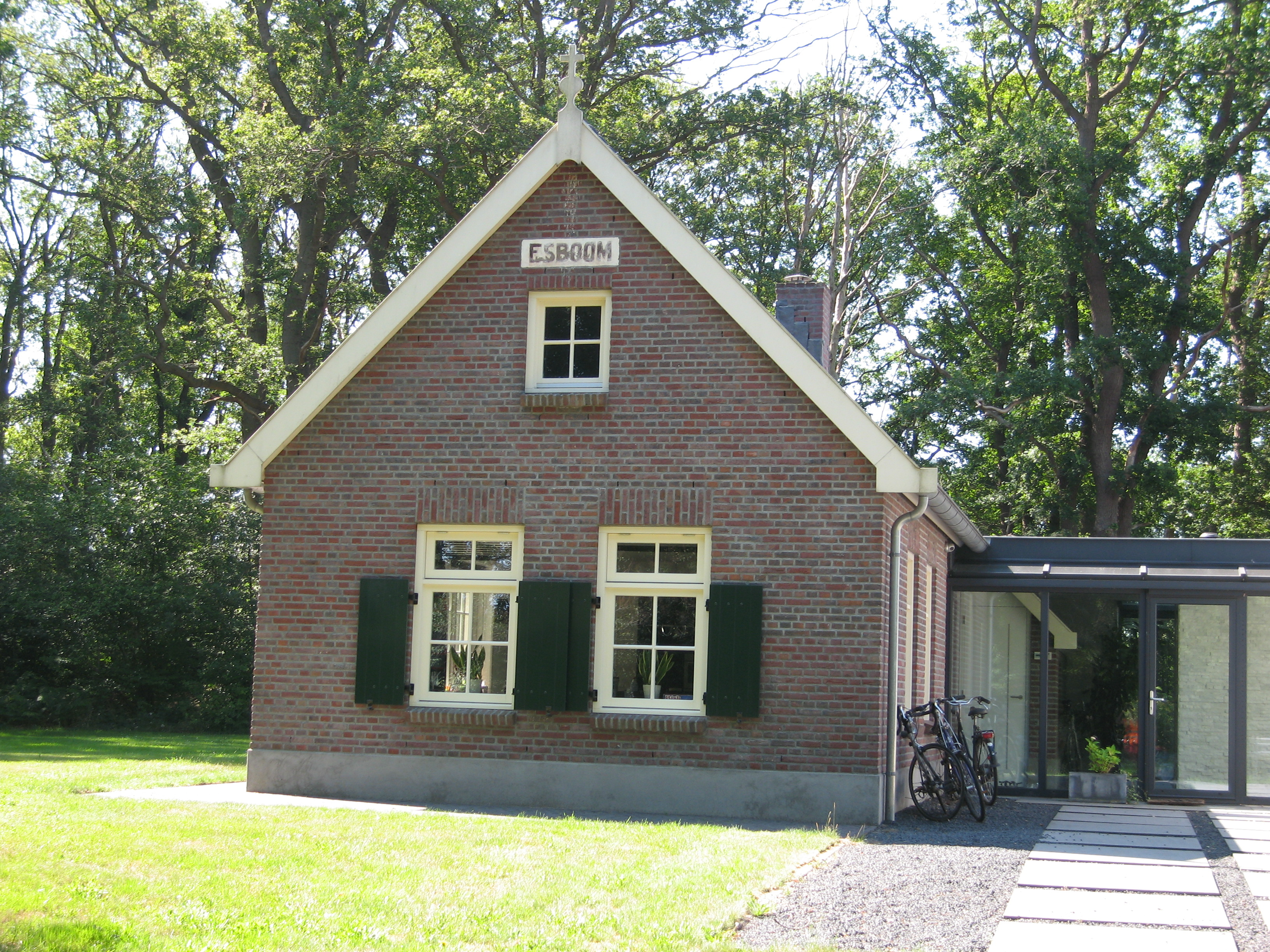
- House in Eefsele

- Location in the Netherlands Eefsele (Netherlands)
- Coordinates: 52.03673°N 6.58980°E
- Country: Netherlands
- Province: Gelderland
- Municipality: Oost Gelre
- Elevation: 21 m (69 ft)
- Time zone: UTC+1 (CET)
  - Summer (DST): UTC+2 (CEST)
- Postal code: 7137
- Dialing code: 0544

Eefsele is a hamlet in the Dutch municipality of Oost Gelre, a part of the province of Gelderland, Netherlands.

It was first mentioned in 1315 or 1316 as Everslo, and means "forest of Evert (person)". It is not a statistical entity, and the postal authorities have placed it under Lievelde. The hamlet was accidentally bombed on 8 February 1945, because the target was a German stronghold in the forest. Eefsele consists of about 80 houses.
