= Sander Boschker =

Dutch footballer and coach

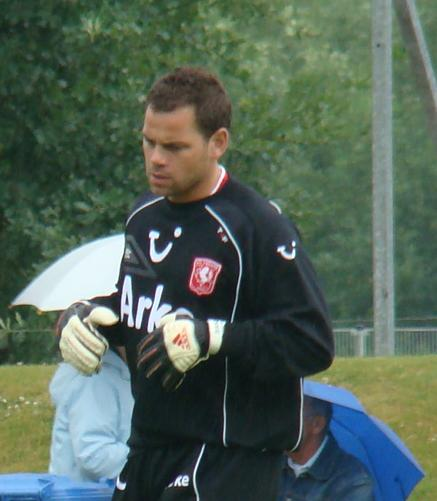
- Boschker in training with Twente in 2008

Personal information
- Full name: Sander Bernard Jozef Boschker
- Date of birth: 20 October 1970 (age 56)
- Place of birth: Lichtenvoorde, Netherlands
- Height: 1.84 m (6 ft 0 in)
- Position: Goalkeeper

Youth career
- 1978–1986: Longa '30
- 1986–1989: Twente

Senior career*
Years	Team	Apps	(Gls)
1989–2003	Twente	356	(0)
2003–2004	Ajax	0	(0)
2004–2014	Twente	206	(0)
Total		562	(0)

International career
2010	Netherlands	1	(0)
Medal record
Representing Netherlands
Men's football
FIFA World Cup
Runner-up	2010	Team
- * Club domestic league appearances and goals

Sander Bernard Jozef Boschker (born 20 October 1970) is a Dutch former professional footballer who played as a goalkeeper. He is currently the kitman at Twente.

During a professional career which spanned 25 years he played mostly for Twente, appearing in 555 Eredivisie games and winning four major titles.

Boschker was part of the Dutch squad at the 2010 World Cup.

== Club career ==
Born in Lichtenvoorde, Oost Gelre, Gelderland, Boschker made his professional debuts with FC Twente in the 1989–90 season, appearing in one game with the first team. After an irregular beginning he firmly established himself in the side's starting XI, going on to play in more than 400 official matches for the Eredivisie club.

Aged almost 33 Boschker moved to AFC Ajax, but had to settle with battling for being backup with the Amsterdam club, unable to dislodge youth product Maarten Stekelenburg. The following summer he returned to Twente, adding next to 200 more official appearances (in the 2008–09 campaign, he only missed five league contests for an eventual runner-up finish), and playing into his 40s.

In 2009–10, Boschker played in all 34 games as Twente won the first league title in the club's history – he only conceded 23 goals, second-best in the competition. Since 2010, though, he acted as understudy to Nikolay Mihaylov, and spent most of the following year rehabbing after two calf injuries.

On 25 June 2012, Boschker extended his link for another year. He retired at the end of the 2013–14 season.

== International career ==
Although Boschker never made an appearance for the Netherlands until 2010, he was included in Marco van Basten's provisional squad for UEFA Euro 2008. However, following the friendly against Ukraine on 21 May, the manager released him, as he was deemed only the fourth-choice goalkeeper.

After a stellar 2009–10 club season, 39-year-old Boschker was included in the provisional squad of 30 players for the 2010 FIFA World Cup. On 27 May 2010, national team manager Bert van Marwijk announced that the player would be part of the final squad of 23, and Boschker appeared in a friendly with Ghana in Rotterdam (4–1 victory), replacing Michel Vorm at half-time; as a result, he became both the oldest player to ever make his debut and play for the Dutch national team.

== Post-playing career ==
After retiring from playing, Boschker became active in the commercial department of Twente and goalkeepers coach of the women's team. In July 2015 he was appointed as assistant coach of Jong Twente. In June 2017, he became goalkeepers coach of the Twente first team.

== Honours ==
Twente

- Eredivisie: 2009–10
- KNVB Cup: 2000–01, 2010–11
- UEFA Intertoto Cup: 2006
- Johan Cruyff Shield: 2011

Ajax

- Eredivisie: 2003–04

Netherlands

- FIFA World Cup runner-up: 2010
