= Zwolle (disambiguation) =

Zwolle is a city and municipality in the Netherlands.

Zwolle may also refer to:

- Zwolle, Gelderland, a village in Oost Gelre, Netherlands
- Zwolle, Louisiana, a town in the United States
- PEC Zwolle, a Dutch football club

== People with the surname ==
- Henk-Jan Zwolle, Dutch rower
- Sandra Zwolle (born 1971), Dutch speed skater
