= Zieuwent =

- Village
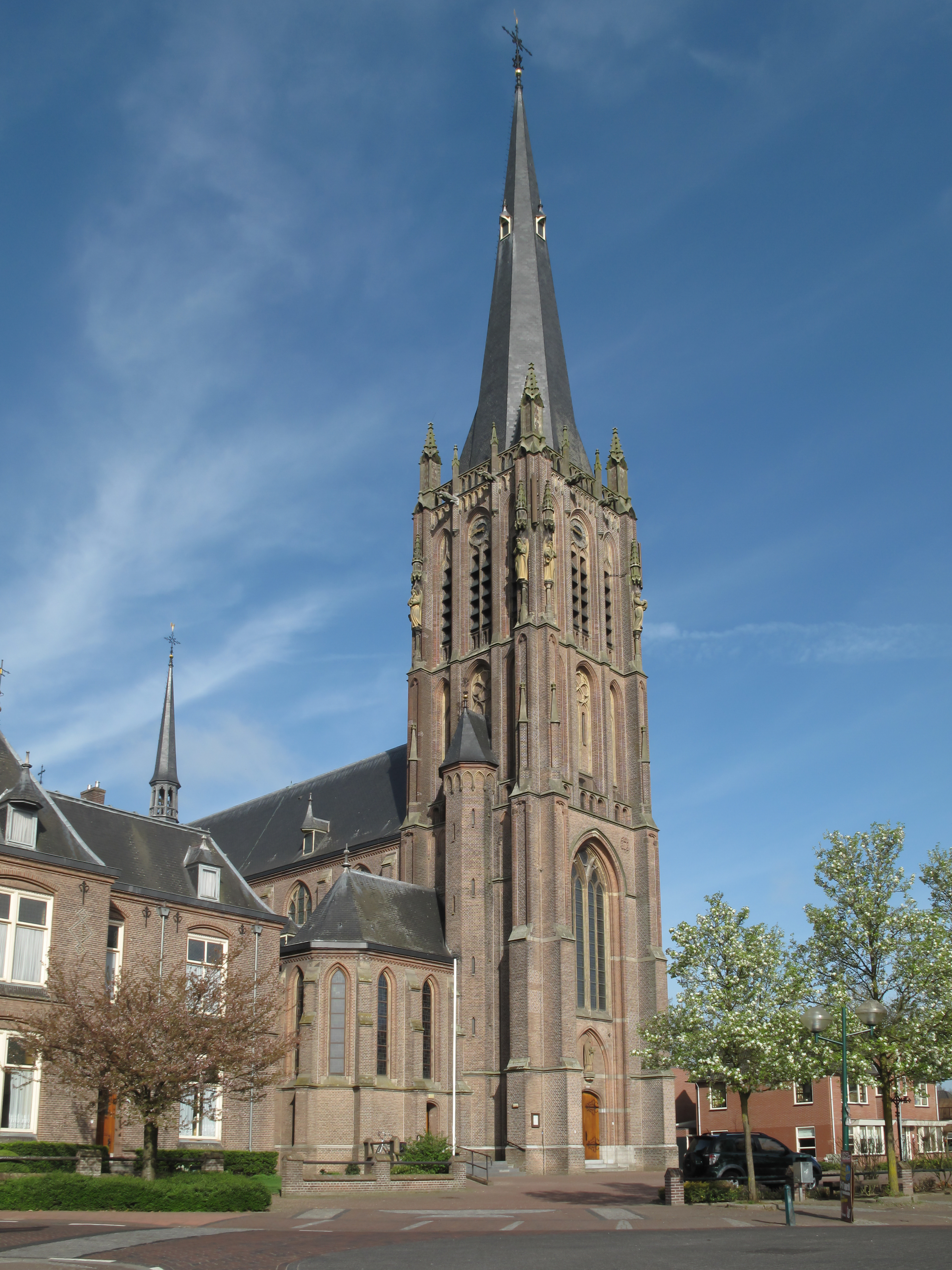
- Church of Zieuwent

- Location in the Netherlands Zieuwent (Netherlands)
- Coordinates: 52.0025°N 6.5194°E
- Country: Netherlands
- Province: Gelderland
- Municipality: Oost Gelre

Area
  - Total: 17.36 km^{2} (6.70 sq mi)
- Elevation: 18 m (59 ft)

Population (2021)
  - Total: 1,980
  - Density: 114/km^{2} (295/sq mi)
- Time zone: UTC+1 (CET)
  - Summer (DST): UTC+2 (CEST)
- Postal code: 7136
- Dialing code: 0544

Zieuwent is a village in the east of the Netherlands. It is located in the municipality of Oost Gelre, Gelderland. Zieuwent has the tallest church tower in the Achterhoek region.

== History ==
Zieuwent was first mentioned in 1294 or 1295 as "silva Synwede", and means "dike which runs sideways". The village started to develop in the 18th century as a peat colony, and formed into a linear settlement. In 1840, it was home to 1,824 people.

In 1795, a small church was built in Zieuwent. In 1894, Sanderink became parson of Zieuwent. In 1895, after a pilgrimage to Kevelaer, he was of the opinion that the village needed a worthy church. Construction started on 30 June 1898, and on 10 October 1899, the Saint Werenfridus Church was inaugurated. The tower is 75 metres (246 ft) tall, making it the tallest of the Achterhoek region.

In 1830, the Rosmolen Zieuwent was constructed. It was a horse powered oil mill constructed on an old farm. In 1932, it was bought by the Netherlands Open Air Museum and moved to Arnhem. It was displayed but never used. In the early 21st century, an electric engine of 1 hp was installed to simulate the horse.

Zieuwent was part of the municipality of Lichtenvoorde until 2004 when it was merged into Oost Gelre.

== Sports ==
RKZVC, short for Rooms-Katholieke Zieuwentse Voetbalclub, is a Dutch association football club from Zieuwent.

== Notable people ==
- Suzan Stortelder (born 1992), singer in the duo Suzan & Freek.

== Gallery ==
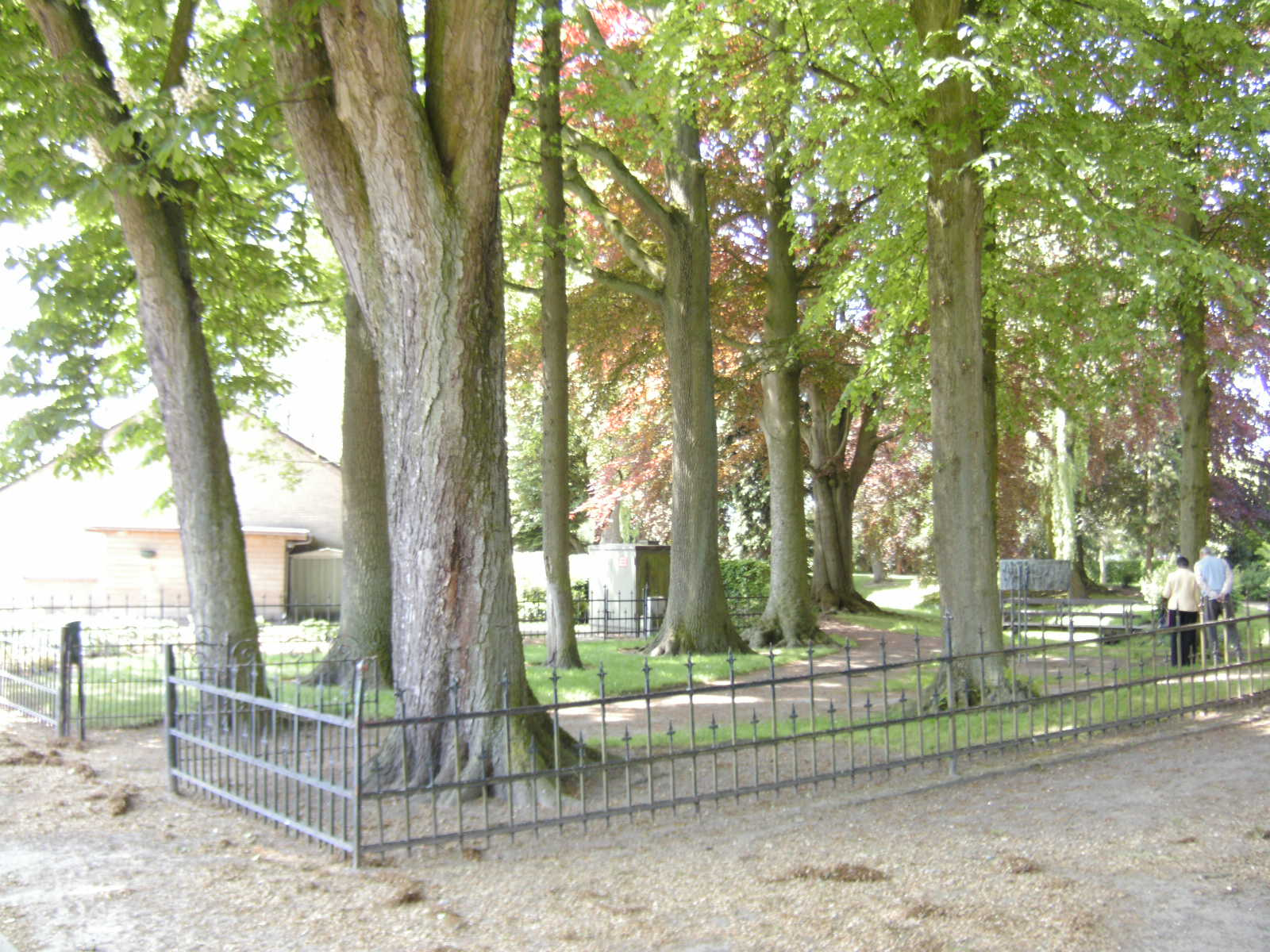
Village green

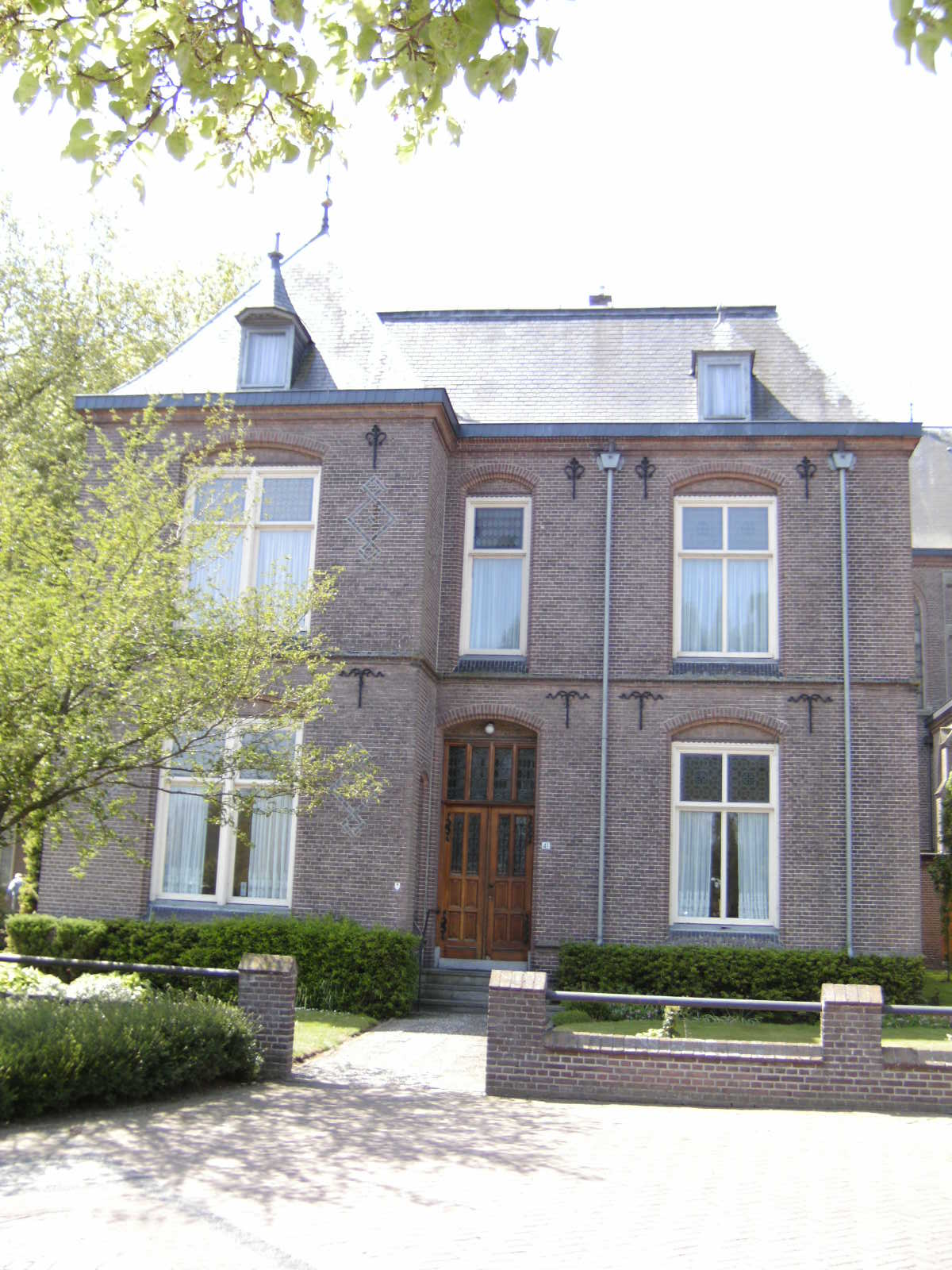
House in Zieuwent

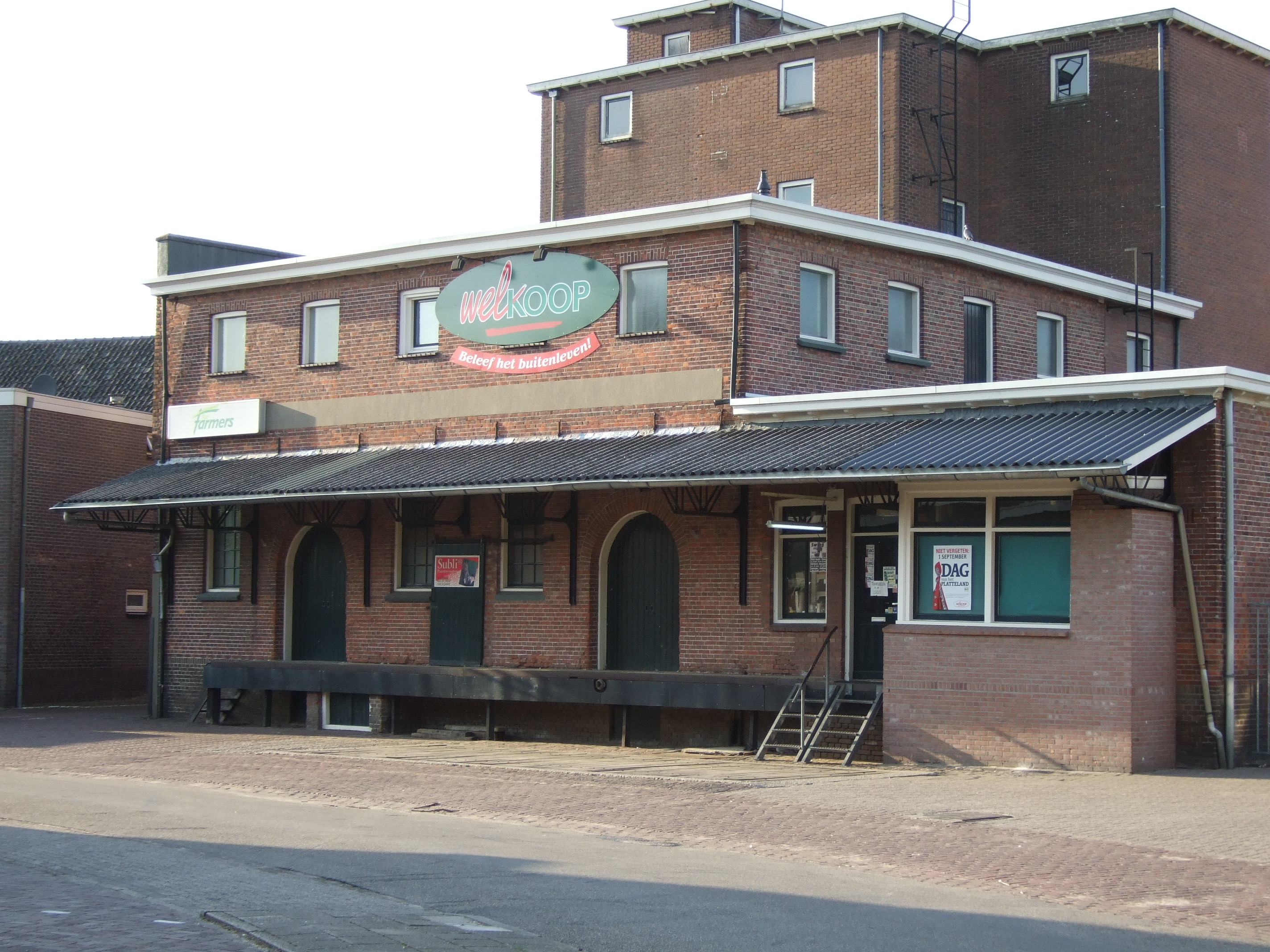
Former factory

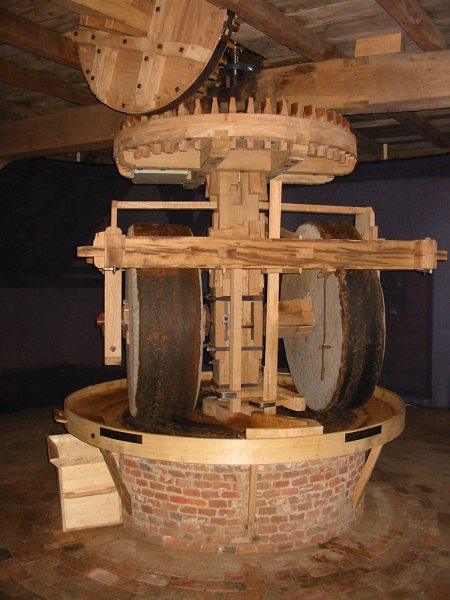
Inside the Horse mill Zieuwent
