= Lievelde =

- Village
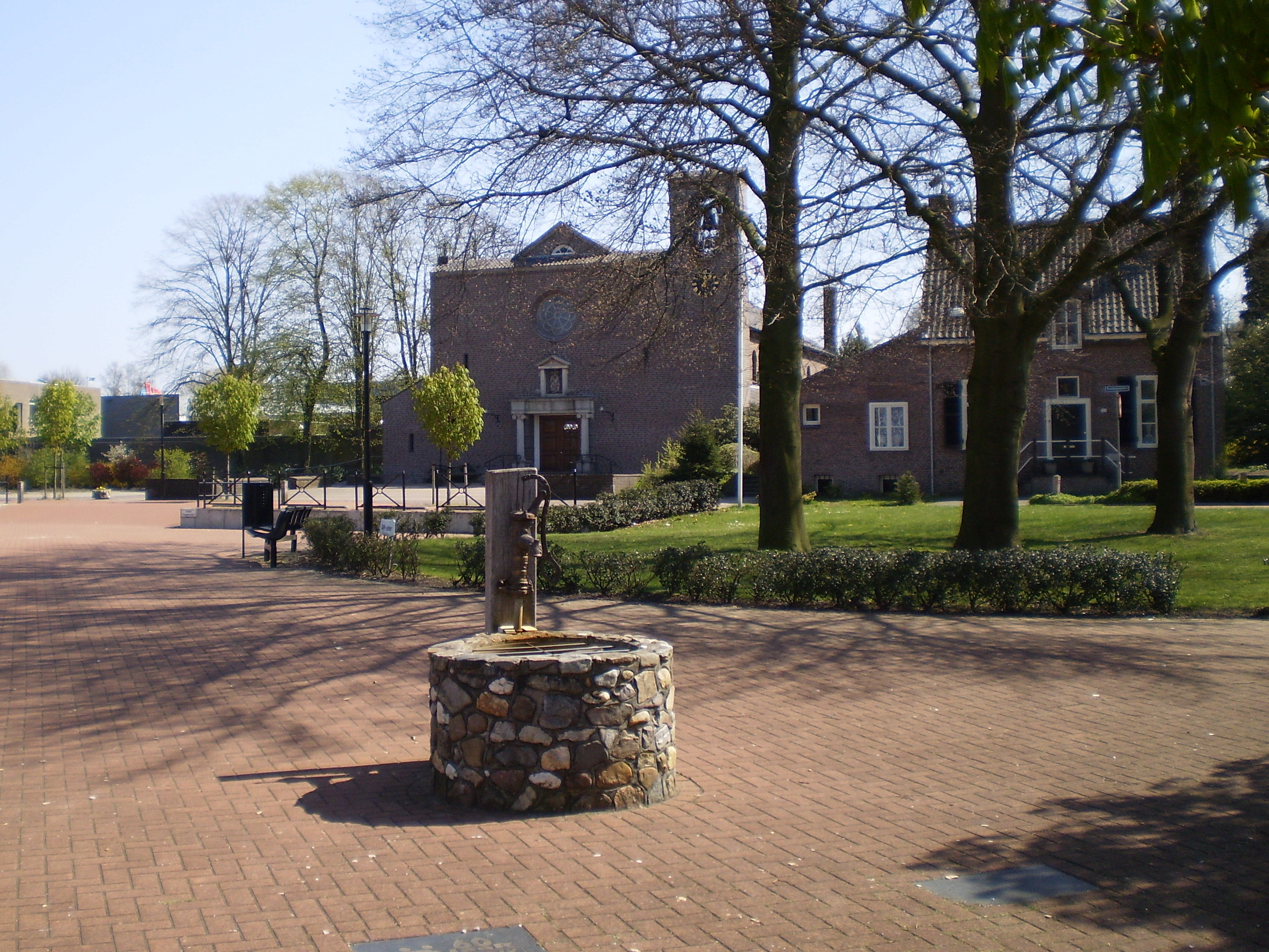
- Lievelde in 2010

- Location in the Netherlands Lievelde (Netherlands)
- Coordinates: 52°0′34″N 6°35′40″E
- Country: Netherlands
- Province: Gelderland
- Municipality: Oost Gelre

Area
  - Total: 16.89 km^{2} (6.52 sq mi)
- Elevation: 21 m (69 ft)

Population (2021)
  - Total: 1,395
  - Density: 82.59/km^{2} (213.9/sq mi)
- Time zone: UTC+1 (CET)
  - Summer (DST): UTC+2 (CEST)
- Postal code: 7137
- Dialing code: 0544

Lievelde (Dutch pronunciation: [ˈlivəldə]) is a small village in the province of Gelderland, in the eastern part of the Netherlands. It is located in between the two towns of Groenlo and Lichtenvoorde.

Lievelde is the place where the regional train station is situated, called Lichtenvoorde-Groenlo railway station.

Lievelde is known locally for its "wool corso", a parade of people and self-made vehicles, fully clothed in colourful died wool, unlike the "flower corso" for which Lichtenvoorde is famous, among others.

In Lievelde is a more or less intact sconce, the Engelse schans (English sconce), which was used during the Siege of Groenlo in 1627.

== Gallery ==
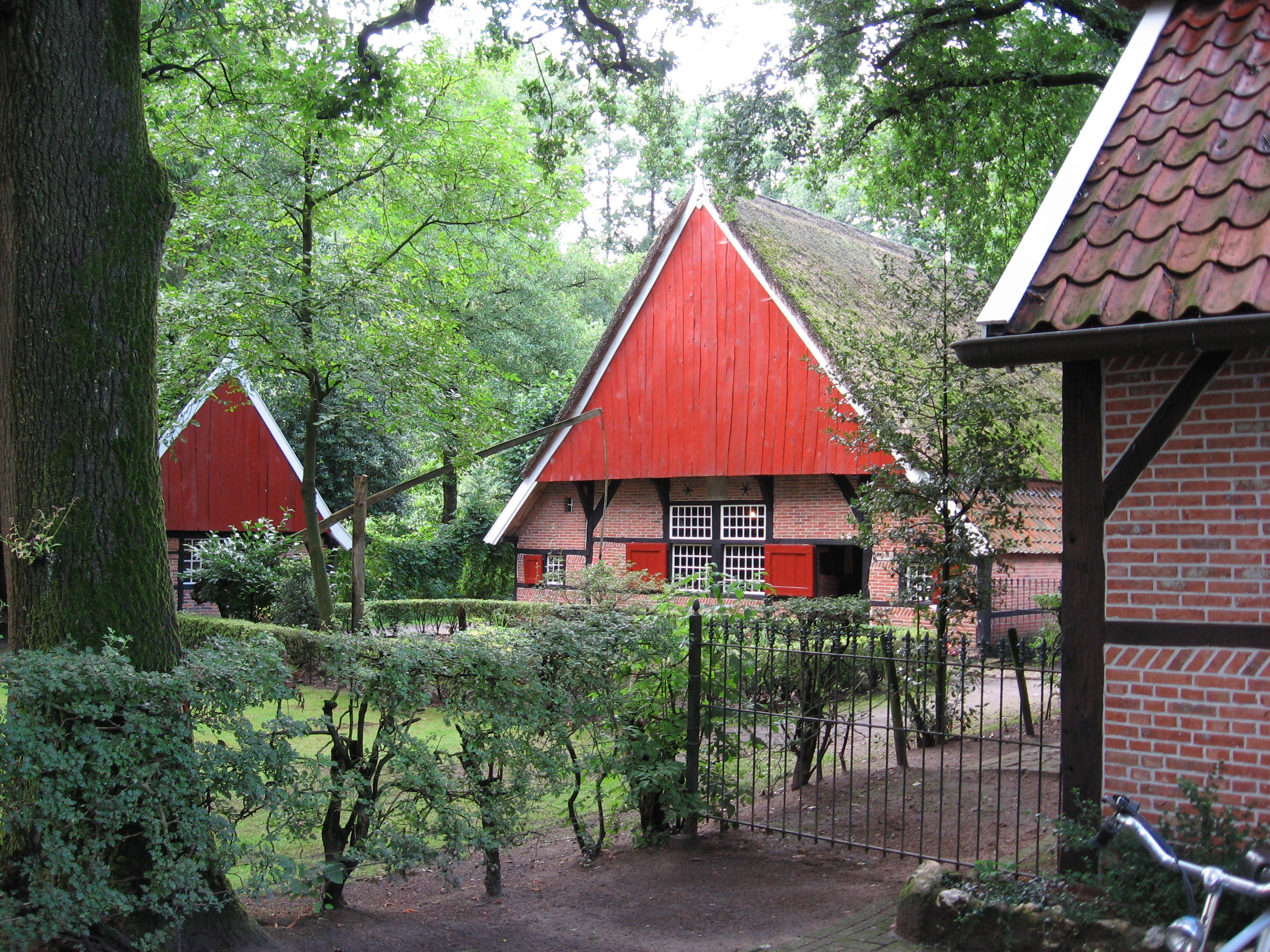
Open air museum in Lievelde

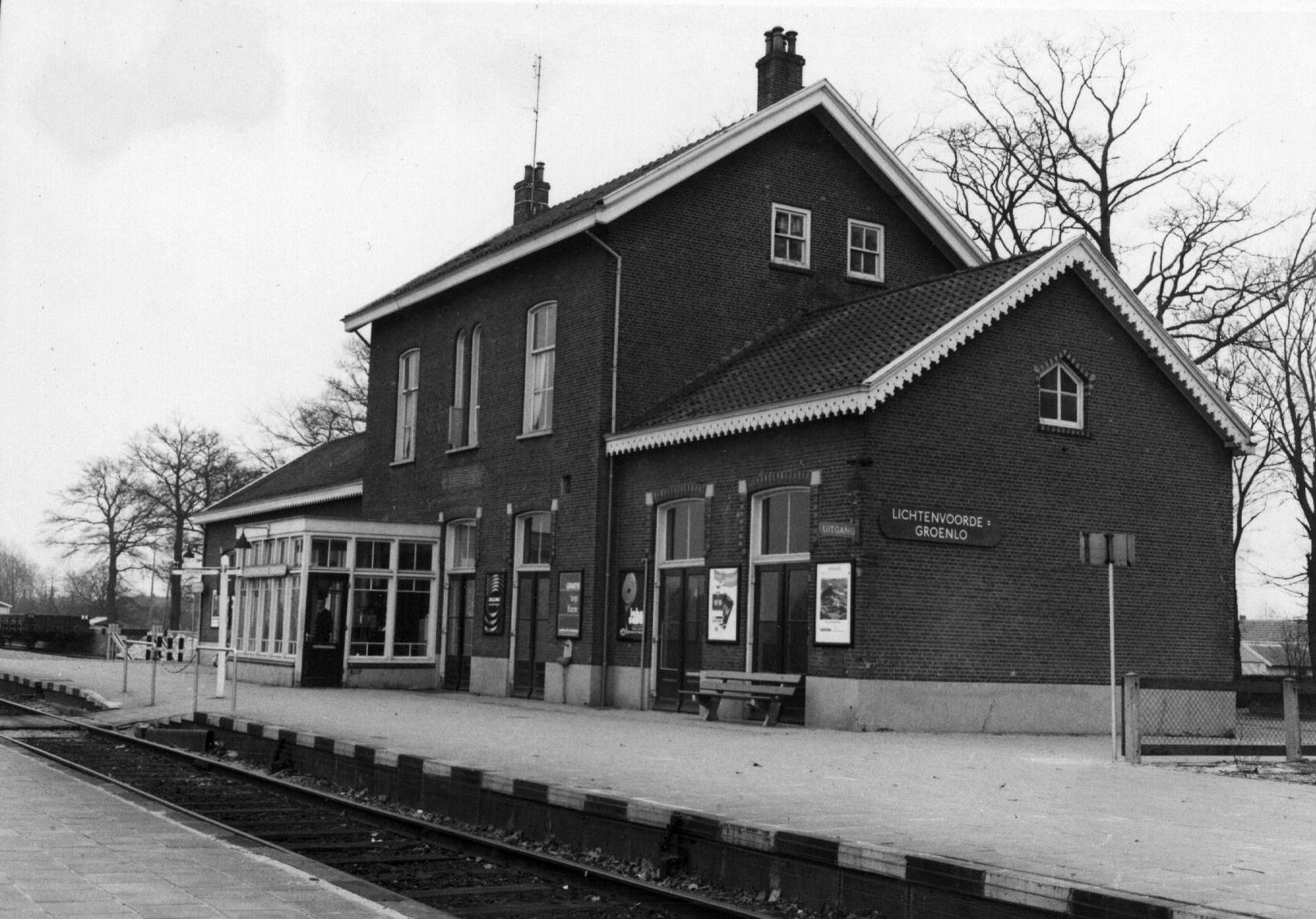
Railway station

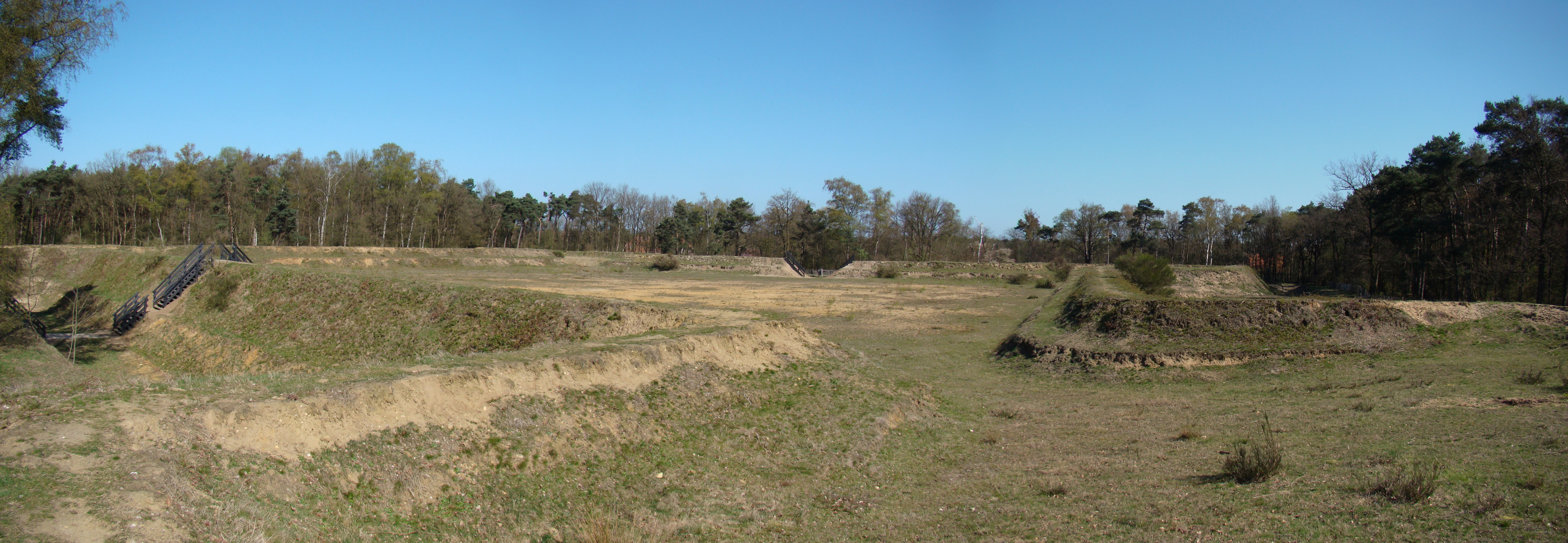
Engelse schans

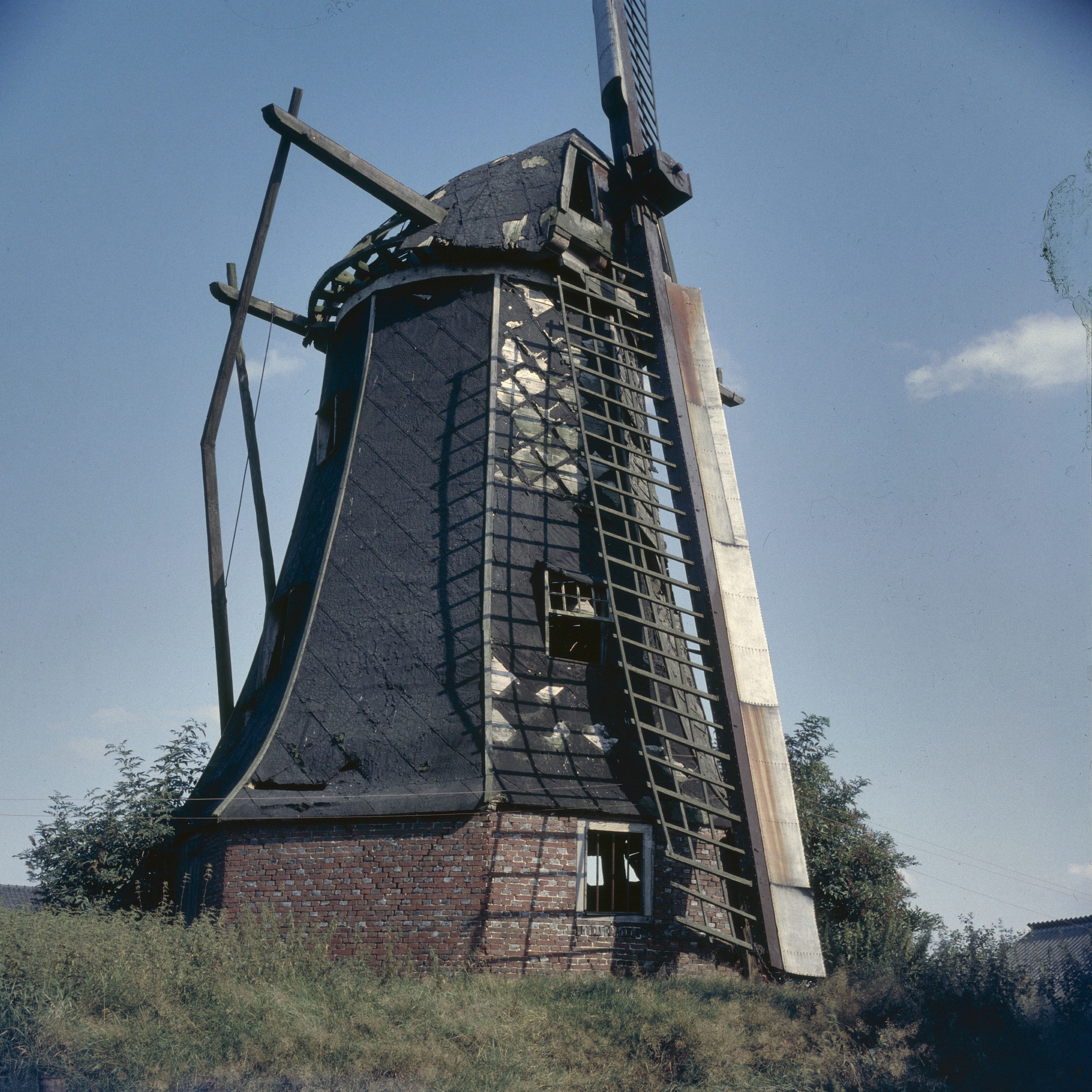
Former windmill demolished in 1968
