= Zwolle, Gelderland =

Zwolle
- Hamlet
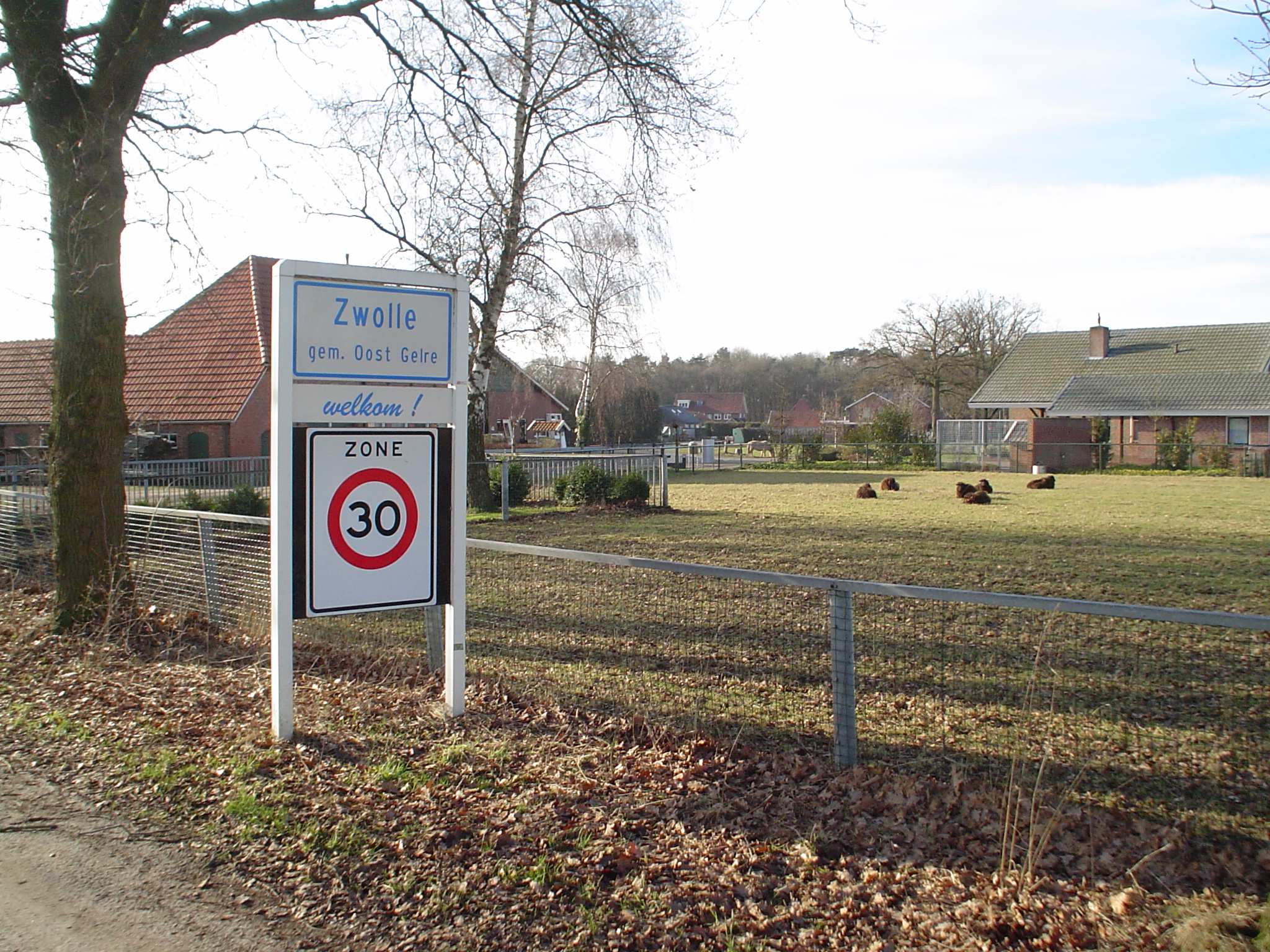
- View of Zwolle from the street Oude Klaverdijk

- Location in the Netherlands Zwolle (Netherlands)
- Coordinates: 52°1′50″N 6°39′13″E
- Country: Netherlands
- Province: Gelderland
- Municipality: Oost Gelre

Area
  - Total: 0.05 km^{2} (0.019 sq mi)
- Elevation: 28 m (92 ft)

Population (2021)
  - Total: 80
  - Density: 1,600/km^{2} (4,100/sq mi)
- Time zone: UTC+1 (CET)
  - Summer (DST): UTC+2 (CEST)
- Postal code: 7142
- Dialing code: 0544

Zwolle is a hamlet in the province of Gelderland, Netherlands. It is located in the municipality of Oost Gelre, about 3 km southeast of the town of Groenlo.

It was first mentioned in 1234 as Suellen and means "height". The postal authorities have placed it under Groenlo. In 1840, Zwolle was home to 245 people. It has its own place name signs.

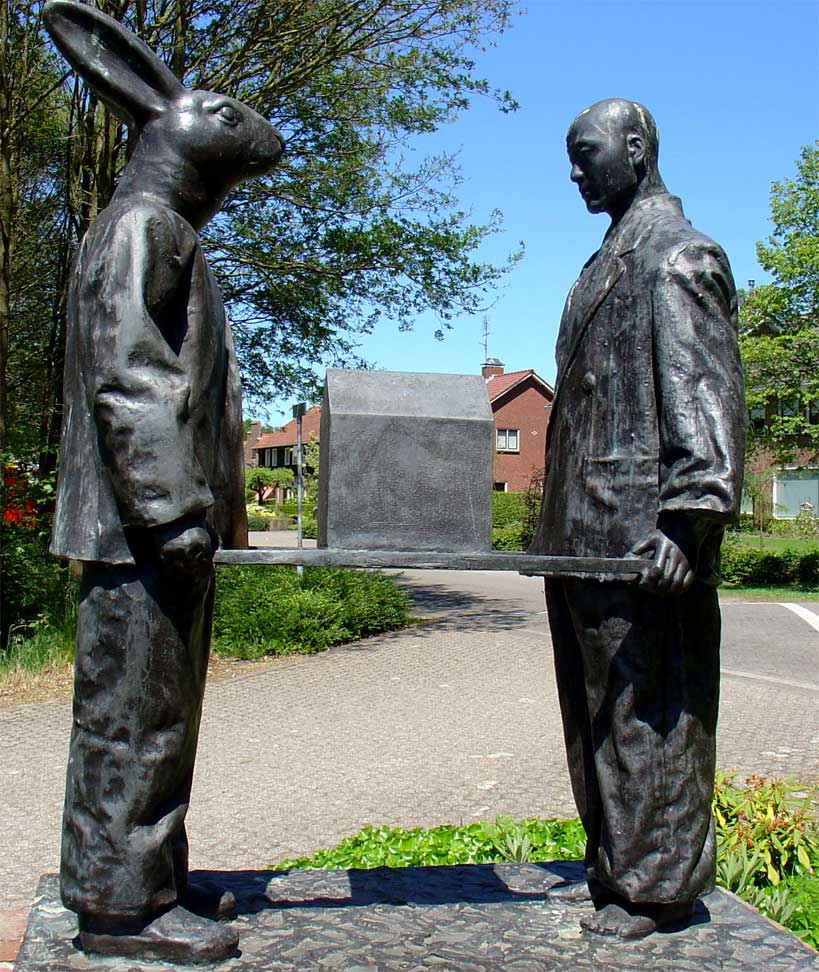
Statue in Zwolle by Nicolas Dings
