= The Sagas of Veluwe =

Collection of Dutch fairy tales

The Sagas of Veluwe (Dutch: Veluwsche Sagen) are collection of Dutch fairy tales from Eastern Netherlands, particularly in the Province of Gelderland in Veluwe. They were collected by Gustaaf van de Wall Perné. He published these tales in two volumes:

== Volume 1 ==
The first volume of the Veluwsche Sagen contains fourteen fairy tales:

- De Groote en de Kleine Hul
- Ontstaan van het Uddeler- en Bleeke meer
- Een sprookje van Pomphul
- De witte juffer van Hoog Soeren
- Van d'Aard-Mansberg en d'Echoput
- De wilde jacht
- Wichard Sage
- De zwarte vrouw van Starveren
- Legende van het Solsche gat
- De Rookberg of Buntermansberg te Nunspeet
- Het Ruitergat
- Het Spook bij het Solsche gat
- De Hooge Duvel en de Rooie Heg
- Om den Heerd

== Volume 2 ==
The second volume of the Veluwsche Sagen contains eight fairy tales:

- De Boomen van Drie
- Hoe de Gruwel aan zijn paard kwam'
- Veurgezicht
- De Juffer van Kwoadenoord
- Toen de Schipper door den Booze gehaald werd
- De Toovenaar en de Schipper
- Bia's Bruidsvaart
- De Woeste Hoeve
