= Lichtenvoorde =

- Town
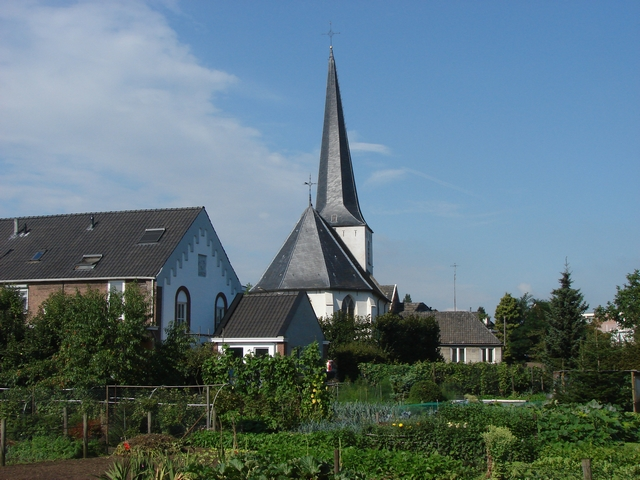
- Protestant St John church

- Flag Coat of arms

- Location in the province of Gelderland in the Netherlands Lichtenvoorde (Netherlands)
- Coordinates: 51°59′17″N 6°34′11″E
- Country: Netherlands
- Province: Gelderland
- Municipality: Oost Gelre

Area
  - Total: 11.49 km^{2} (4.44 sq mi)
- Elevation: 21 m (69 ft)

Population (2021)
  - Total: 12,910
  - Density: 1,124/km^{2} (2,910/sq mi)
- Time zone: UTC+1 (CET)
  - Summer (DST): UTC+2 (CEST)
- Postal code: 7131 & 7132
- Dialing code: 0544

Lichtenvoorde is a town in the east of the Netherlands, in the municipality of Oost Gelre.

Lichtenvoorde holds a flower parade (bloemencorso) every September at the start of its annual festival. The parade features floats covered in flowers (usually dahlias) in imaginative designs depicting a variety of themes.

Lichtenvoorde has a motocross circuit on which international grands prix are held.

== History ==
Lichtenvoorde was the name of a municipality that included the town and the villages of Lievelde, Zieuwent, Vragender and Harreveld, until 1 January 2005, when all were merged into the municipality of Oost Gelre.

Its inhabitants are known colloquially as keienslöppers (boulder draggers) due to a historic event. On 15 March 1874, 99 of the town's shoemakers dragged a 20 ton boulder a distance of around four kilometres to the marketplace to serve as a centerpiece for commemoration of King William III's silver jubilee, after 25 years on the country's throne. The boulder remains there to this day, topped by a stone lion holding the town's coat of arms.

== Gallery ==
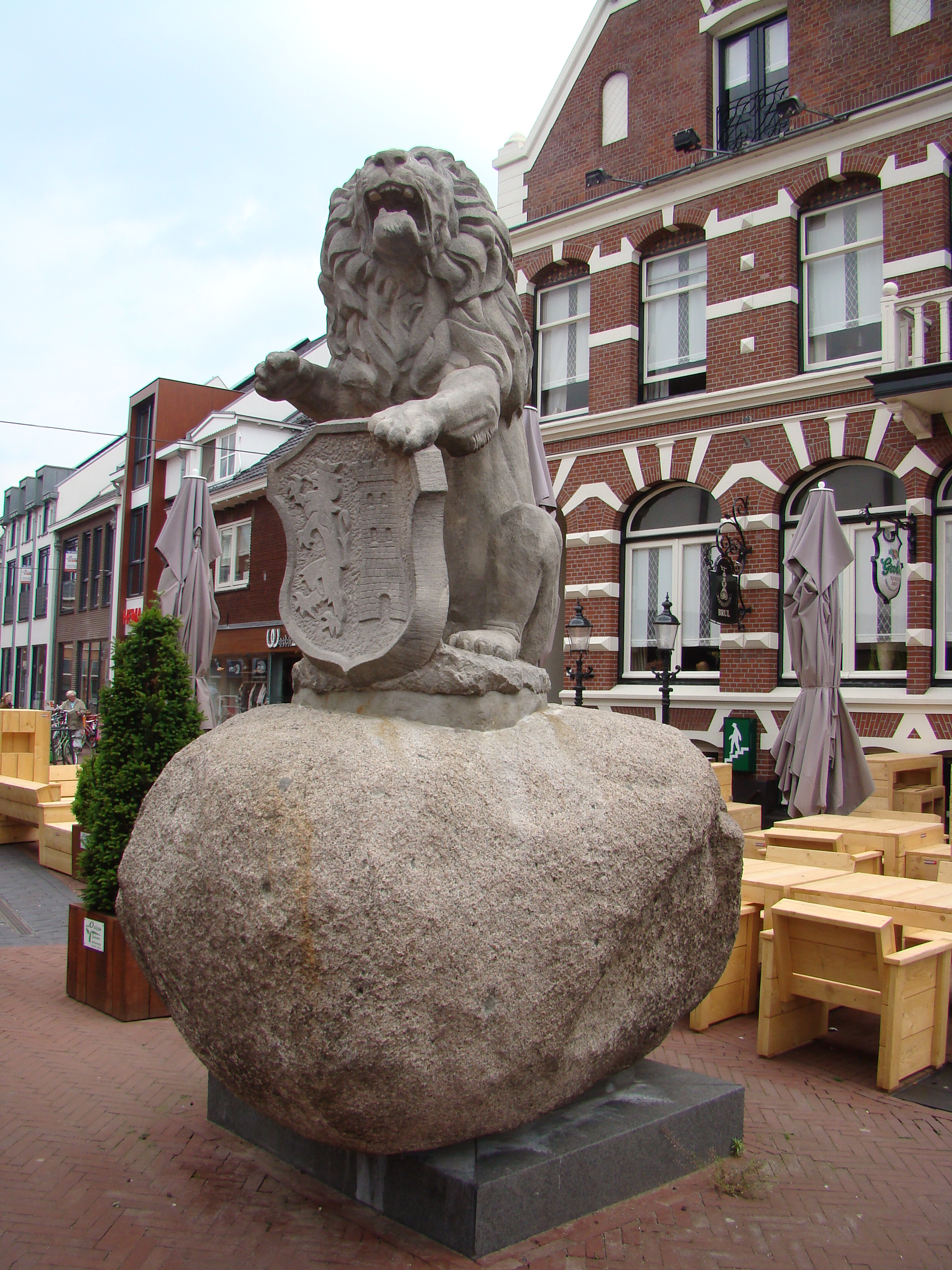
The boulder in the marketplace

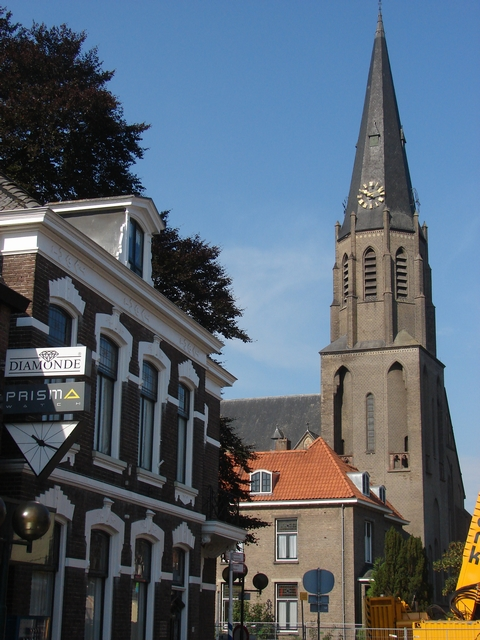
Catholic church in Lichtenvoorde

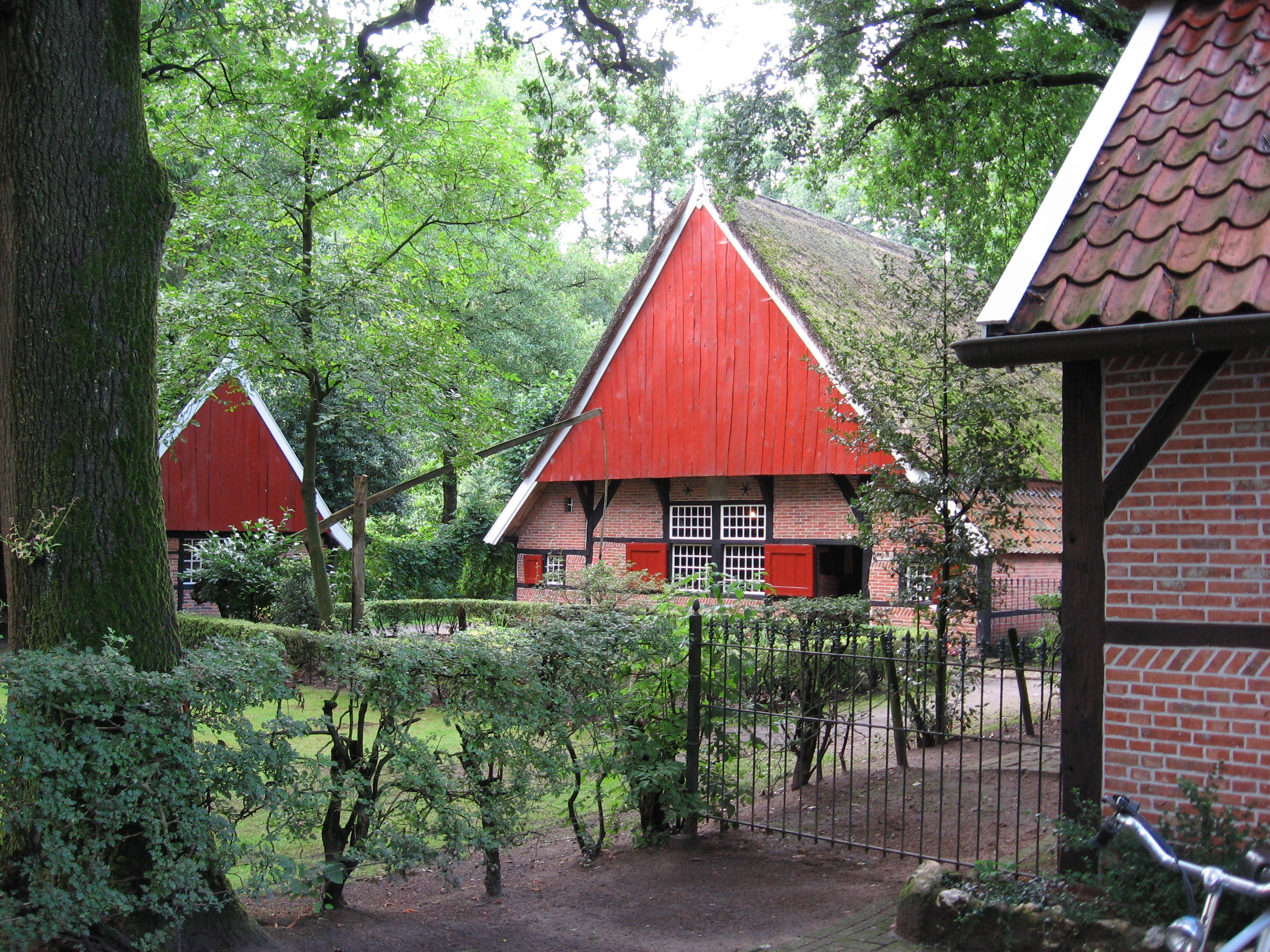
Farm at the open-air museum Erve Kots in Lievelde

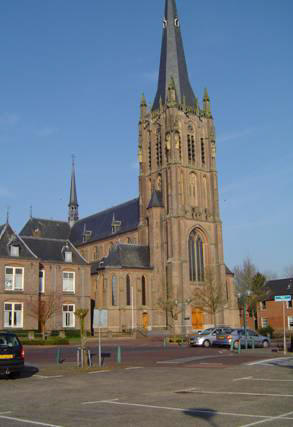
Catholic church in Zieuwent

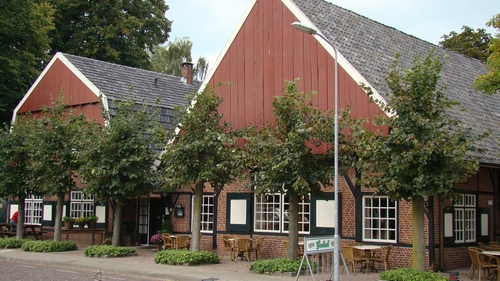
Vragender Village

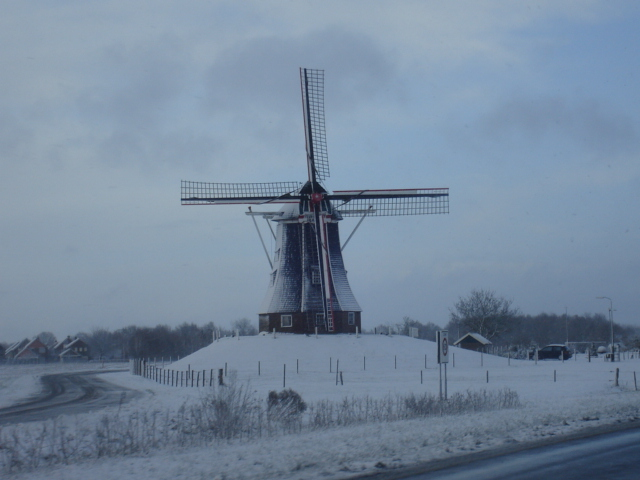
Windmill Hermien in Harreveld
