= Oost Gelre =

- Municipality
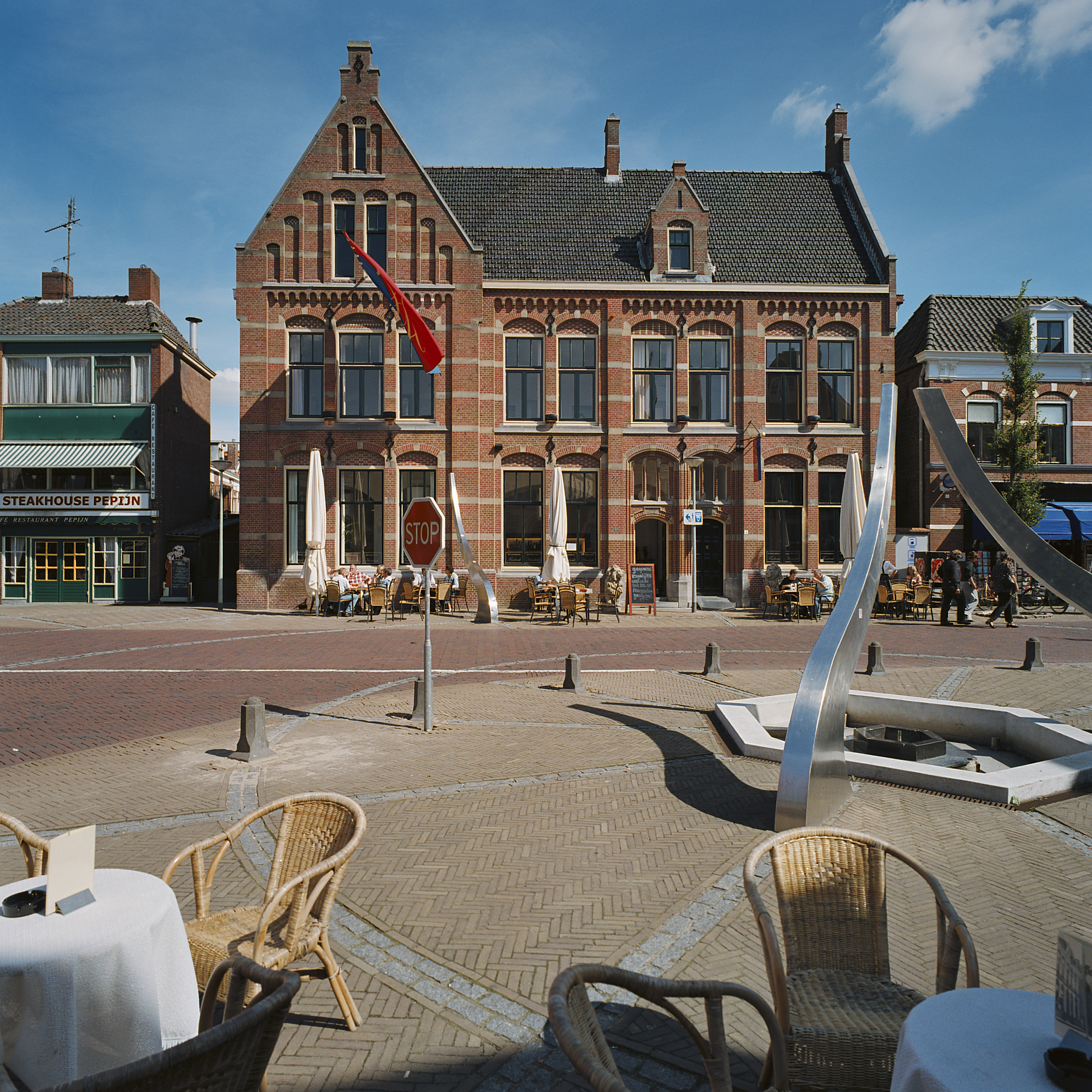
- Monumental post office in Groenlo

- Flag Coat of arms

- Location in Gelderland
- Coordinates: 51°59′N 6°34′E
- Country: Netherlands
- Province: Gelderland

Government
  - Body: Municipal council
  - Mayor: Annette Bronsvoort (PvdA)

Area
  - Total: 110.44 km^{2} (42.64 sq mi)
  - Land: 109.93 km^{2} (42.44 sq mi)
  - Water: 0.51 km^{2} (0.20 sq mi)
- Elevation: 21 m (69 ft)

Population (January 2021)
  - Total: 29,574
  - Density: 269/km^{2} (700/sq mi)
- Time zone: UTC+1 (CET)
  - Summer (DST): UTC+2 (CEST)
- Postcode: 7130–7141, 7263
- Area code: 0544
- Website: www.oostgelre.nl

Oost Gelre is a municipality in the Achterhoek, in the eastern Netherlands. On 1 January 2005, the municipalities Groenlo and Lichtenvoorde merged and formed the new municipality Oost Gelre, which was called Groenlo until 19 May 2006.

== Population centres ==
- Eefsele
- Groenlo
- Harreveld
- Lichtenvoorde
- Lievelde
- Mariënvelde
- Vragender
- Zieuwent
- Zwolle (Gelderland)

== Topography ==
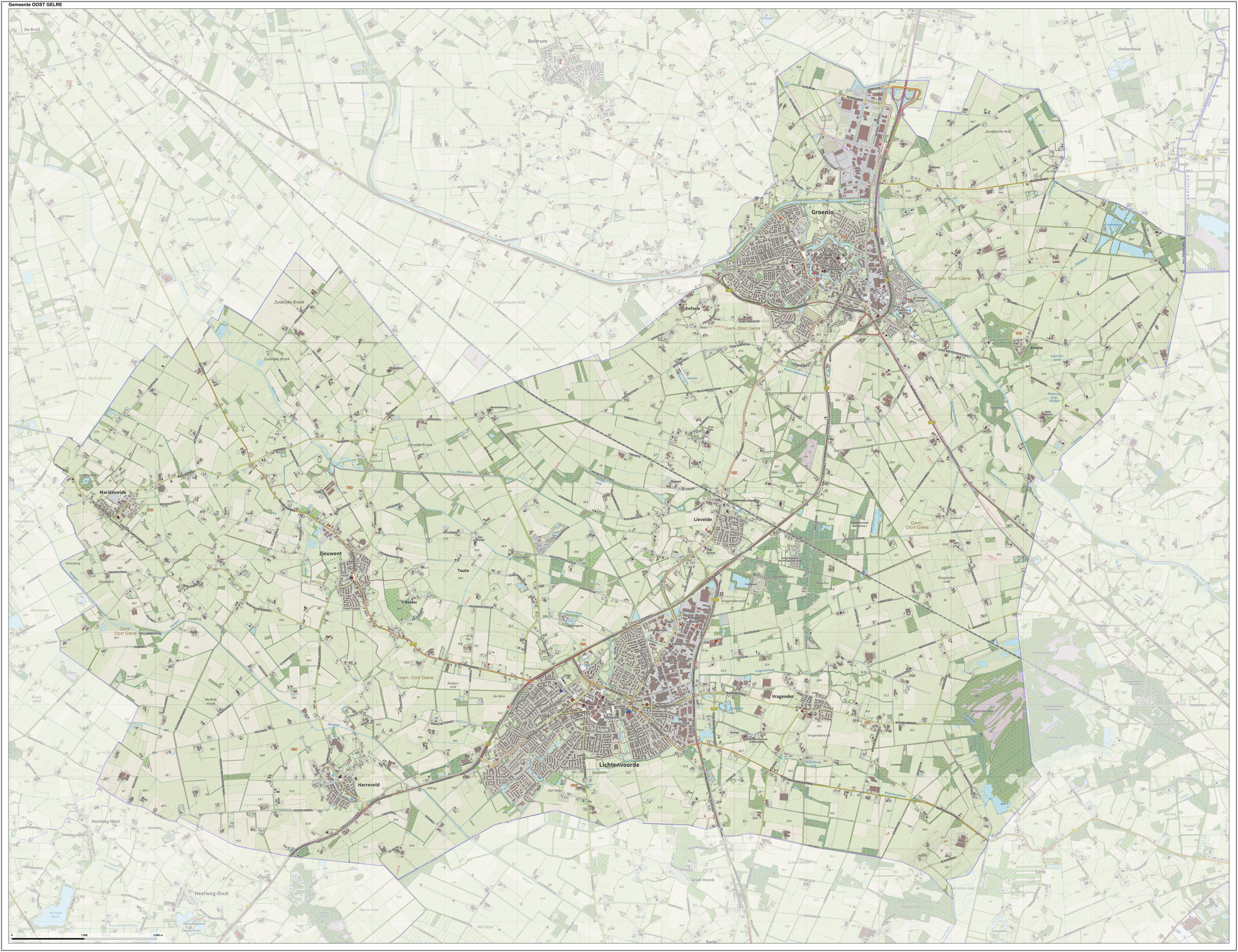

Dutch Topographic map of the municipality of Oost Gelre, June 2015

== Notable people ==
=== Arts ===
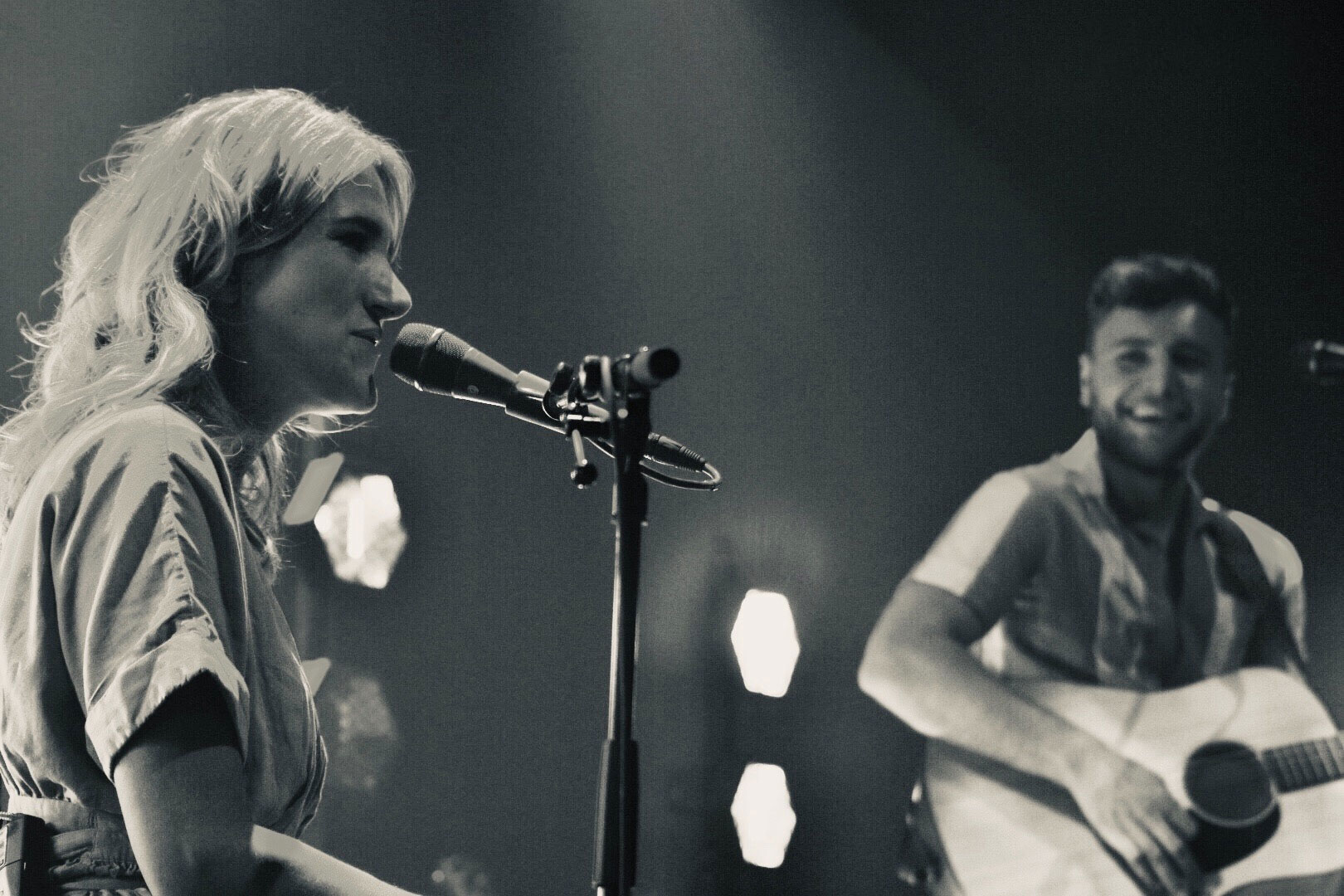
Suzan & Freek, popular musical duo were both born in Oost-Gelre.

- Marco Blaauw (born 1965 in Lichtenvoorde), trumpeter
- Tom Holkenborg (born 1967 in Lichtenvoorde) aka Junkie XL, composer, multi-instrumentalist, DJ, producer and engineer
- Peter Beets (grew up in Groenlo), jazz pianist
- Esther Rots (born 1972 in Groenlo), film director
- Menno Veldhuis (born 1974 in Groenlo), artist
- Thomas Puskailer (born 1981 in Lichtenvoorde), Dutch-born Slovak singer and songwriter
- Suzan Stortelder (born 1992 in Ziewent), singer and one half of Suzan & Freek
- Freek Rikkerink (born 1993 in Harreveld), singer and one half of Suzan & Freek

=== Politics ===
- Willem Maurits Bruyninck (1689 in Lichtenvoorde - ??), the 25th Governor of Ceylon
- Tjitske Siderius (born 1981 in Groenlo), Dutch politician

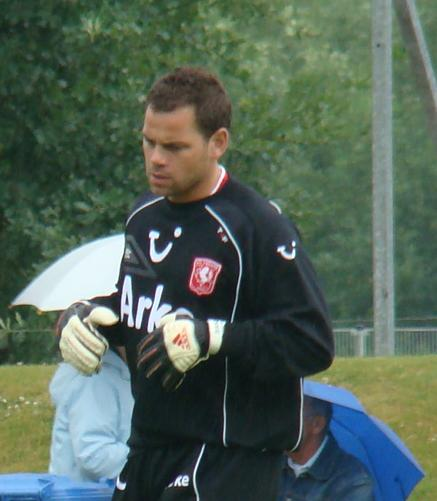
Sander Boschker in 2008.

=== Sport ===
- Hans Smees (born 1970 in Harreveld), retired motorcycle racer
- Sander Boschker (born 1970 in Lichtenvoorde), retired goalkeeper with 555 club caps
- Tristan Hoffman (born 1970 in Groenlo), retired road racing cyclist
- Dave Bus (born 1978 in Lichtenvoorde), football defender
- Joost Wichman (born 1978 in Lichtenvoorde), mountainbiker and former world champion
- Loes Gunnewijk (born 1980 in Groenlo), former professional Dutch racing cyclist, competed at the 2012 Summer Olympics
- Anneke Beerten (born 1982 in Mariënvelde), mountain cyclist
- Hidde Jurjus (born 1994 in Lichtenvoorde), footballer

=== Theology ===
- Herman Herbers (born 1540 or 1544 in Groenlo), theologian and pastor

== Gallery ==
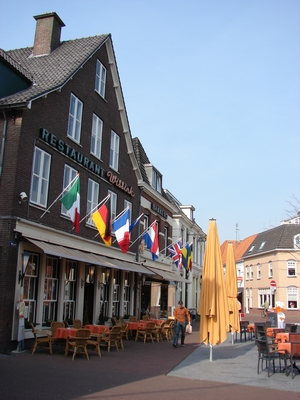
Groenlo, marketplace

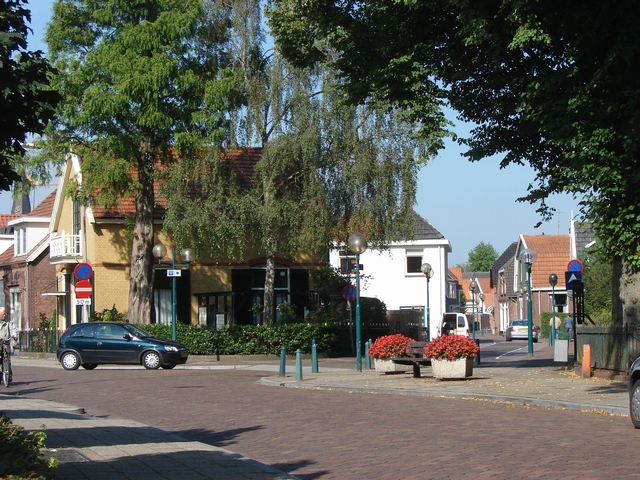
Lichtenvoorde

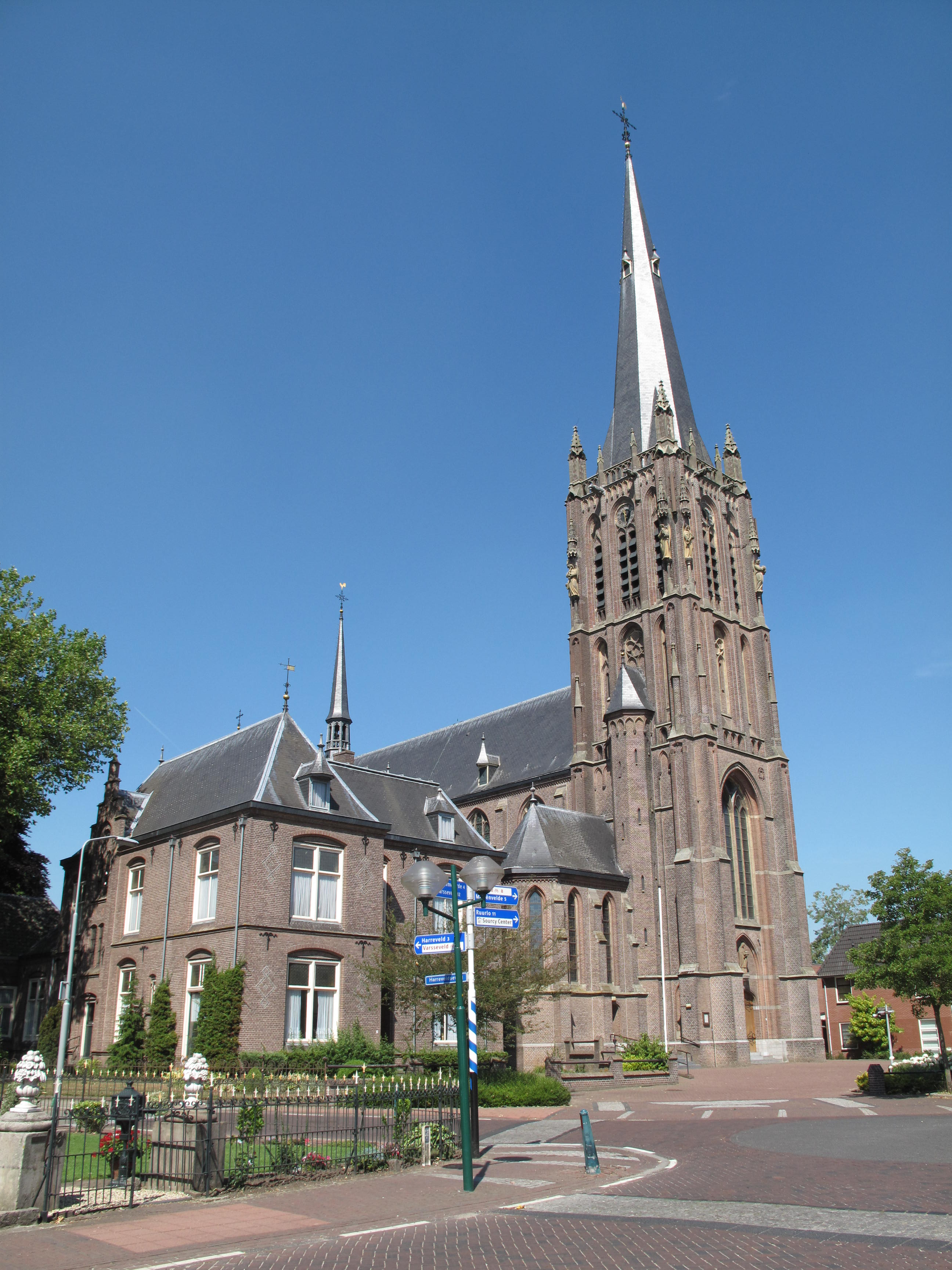
Zieuwent, church

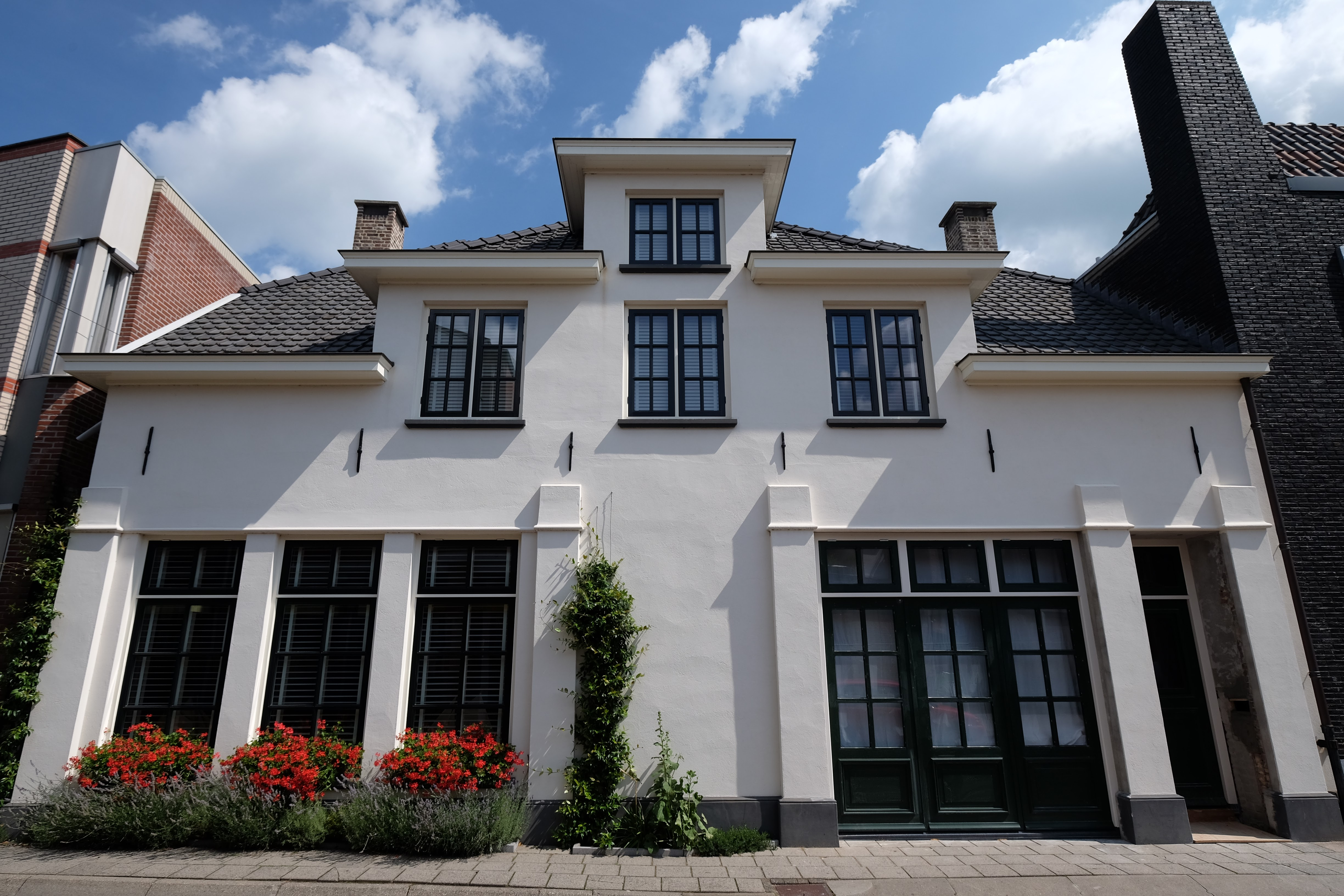
Groenlo

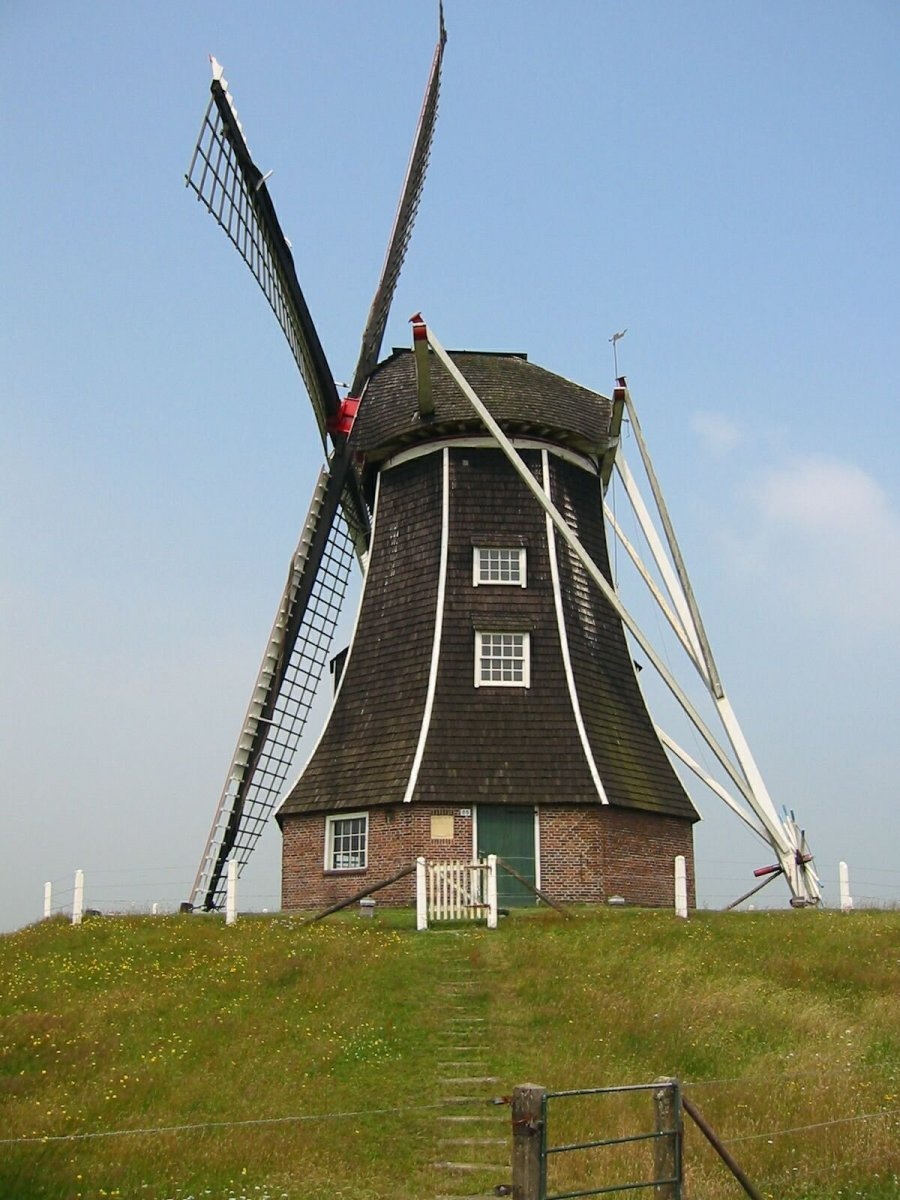
Windmill in Harreveld
