= Gelderland =

Province of the Netherlands

Gelderland Gelderland (Dutch)
- Province
- Province of Gelderland; Provincie Gelderland (Dutch)
- Flag Coat of arms Brandmark
- Anthem: "Ons Gelderland" "Our Gelderland"
- Location of Gelderland in the Netherlands

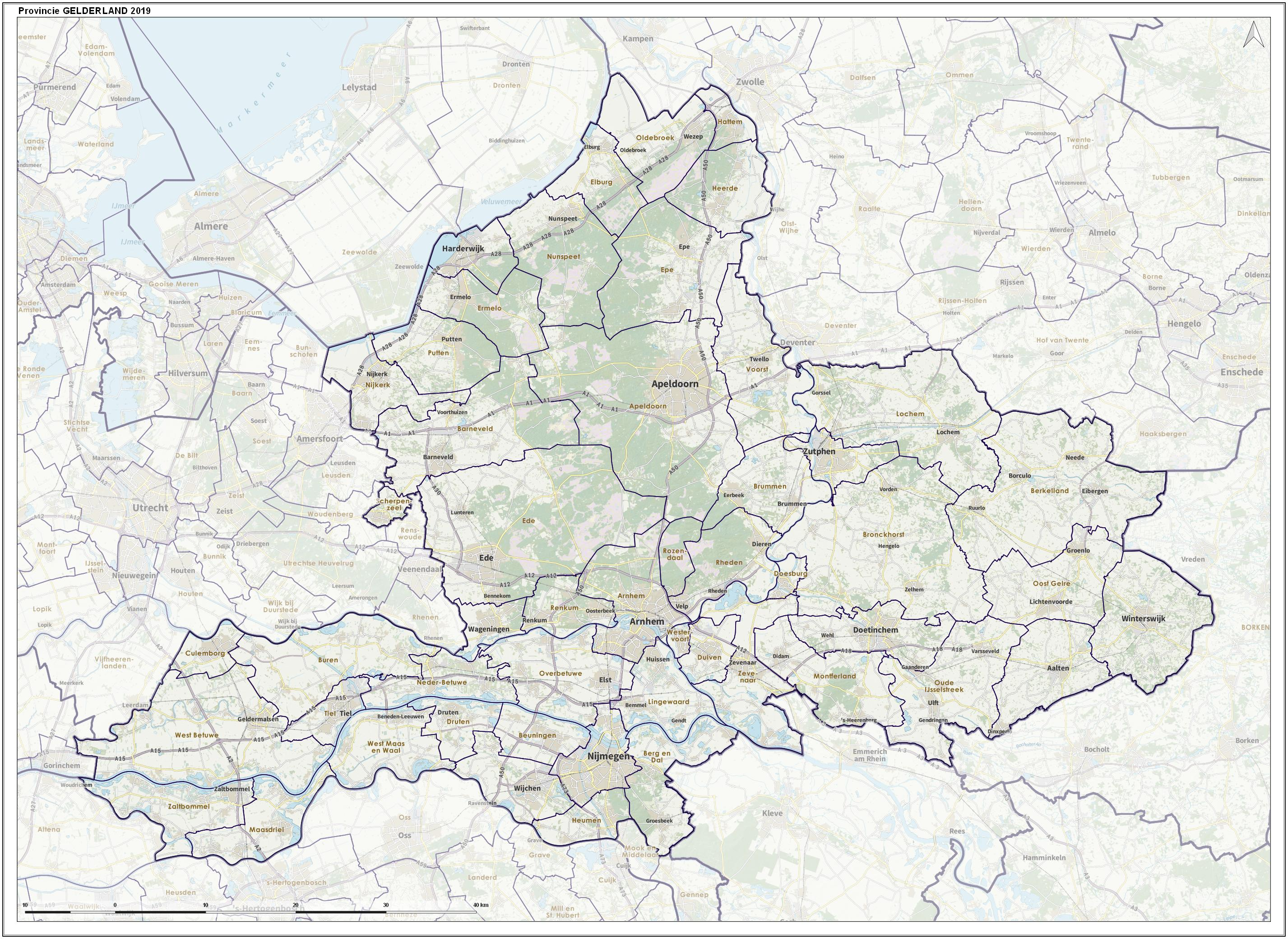
- Topography map of Gelderland
- Coordinates: 52.06°N 5.95°E
- Country: Netherlands
- Capital: Arnhem
- Largest city: Nijmegen

Government
  - King's Commissioner: Daniël Wigboldus (Independent)
  - Council: States of Gelderland

Area (2023)
  - Total: 5,136 km^{2} (1,983 sq mi)
  - Land: 4,960 km^{2} (1,920 sq mi)
  - Water: 176 km^{2} (68 sq mi)
  - Rank: 2nd

Population (1 January 2023)
  - Total: 2,133,708
  - Rank: 4th
  - Density: 430/km^{2} (1,100/sq mi)
  - Rank: 6th

GDP
  - Total: €114.887 bn (2024)
  - Per capita: €53,164 (2024)
- ISO 3166 code: NL-GE
- Religion (2015): 46% Not religious, 23% Protestant, 22% Catholic
- HDI (2021): 0.930 very high · 5th of 12
- Website: www.gelderland.nl

Gelderland (/ˈɡɛldərlənd/ GHEL-dər-lənd, Dutch: [ˈɣɛldərlɑnt]), also known as Guelders (/ˈɡɛldərz/ GHEL-dərz) in English, is a province of the Netherlands, located in the centre-east of the country. With a total area of 5,136 km^{2} (1,983 sq mi) of which 176 km^{2} (68 sq mi) is water, it is the largest province of the Netherlands by land area, and second by total area. Gelderland shares borders with six other provinces (Flevoland, Limburg, North Brabant, Overijssel, South Holland and Utrecht) and the German state of North Rhine-Westphalia.

The capital is Arnhem (pop. 159,265); however, Nijmegen (pop. 176,731) and Apeldoorn (pop. 162,445) are both larger municipalities. Other major regional centres in Gelderland are Ede, Doetinchem, Zutphen, Harderwijk, Tiel, Wageningen, Zevenaar, and Winterswijk. Gelderland had a population of about 2,134,000 as of January 2023. It contains the Netherlands's largest forest region (the Veluwe), the Rhine and other major rivers, and a significant amount of orchards in the south (Betuwe).

== History ==
Historically, the province dates from states of the Holy Roman Empire and takes its name from the nearby German city of Geldern. According to the Wichard saga, the Lords of Pont fought and killed a dragon in 878 AD, and named the town they founded after the death-rattle of the dragon: "Gelre!"

The County of Guelders arose out of the Frankish pagus Hamaland in the 11th century around castles near Roermond and Geldern. The counts of Gelre acquired the Betuwe and Veluwe regions and, through marriage, the County of Zutphen. Thus the counts of Guelders laid the foundation for a territorial power that, through control of the Rhine, Waal, Meuse and IJssel rivers, was to play an important role in the later Middle Ages. The geographical position of their territory dictated the external policy of the counts during the following centuries; they were committed to the interests of the Holy Roman Empire and to expansion south and west.

Further enlarged by the acquisition of the imperial city of Nijmegen in the 13th century, the countship was raised to a duchy in 1339 by the Holy Roman Emperor Louis IV. After 1379, the duchy was ruled from Jülich and by the counts of Egmond and Cleves. The duchy resisted Burgundian domination, but William, Duke of Jülich-Cleves-Berg was forced to cede it to Charles V in 1543, after which it formed part of the Burgundian-Habsburg hereditary lands.

The duchy revolted with the rest of the Netherlands against Philip II of Spain and joined the Union of Utrecht (1579). After the deposition of Philip II, its sovereignty was vested in the States of Gelderland, and the princes of Orange were stadtholders. In 1672, the province was temporarily occupied by Louis XIV and, in 1713, the southeastern part, including the ducal capital of Geldern, fell to Prussia. Part of the Batavian Republic (1795–1806), of Louis Bonaparte's Kingdom of Holland (1806–10), and of the French Empire (1810–13), Gelderland became a province of the Kingdom of the Netherlands in 1815.

During the Second World War, the area saw heavy fighting between Allied Paratroopers, British XXX Corps and the German II SS Panzer Corps, at the Battle of Arnhem.

== Geography ==
Gelderland can roughly be divided into four geographical regions: the Veluwe in the north, the Rivierenland including the Betuwe in the southwest, the Achterhoek ('back corner') or Graafschap (which originally means earldom or county) in the east and the city-region of Arnhem and Nijmegen in the centre-south.

=== Municipalities ===
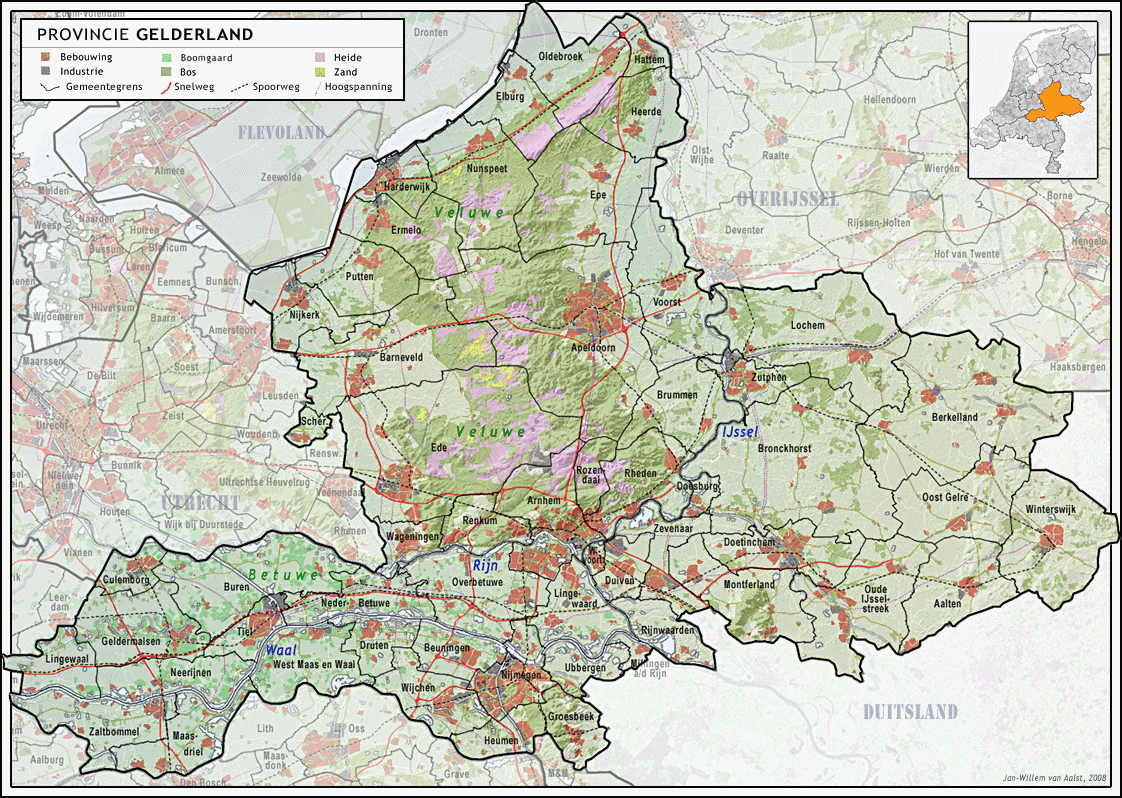
Clickable map of Gelderland

In 2020, the 51 municipalities in Gelderland were divided into four COROPs:

- Veluwe COROP group
  - Apeldoorn
  - Barneveld
  - Ede
  - Elburg
  - Epe
  - Ermelo
  - Harderwijk
  - Hattem
  - Heerde
  - Nijkerk
  - Nunspeet
  - Oldebroek
  - Putten
  - Scherpenzeel
  - Voorst
  - Wageningen
- South West Gelderland COROP group
  - Buren
  - Culemborg
  - Maasdriel
  - Neder-Betuwe
  - Tiel
  - West Betuwe
  - West Maas en Waal
  - Zaltbommel
- Achterhoek COROP group
  - Aalten
  - Berkelland
  - Bronckhorst
  - Brummen
  - Doetinchem
  - Lochem
  - Montferland
  - Oost Gelre
  - Oude IJsselstreek
  - Winterswijk
  - Zutphen
- Arnhem & Nijmegen COROP group
  - Arnhem
  - Berg en Dal
  - Beuningen
  - Doesburg
  - Druten
  - Duiven
  - Heumen
  - Lingewaard
  - Nijmegen
  - Overbetuwe
  - Renkum
  - Rheden
  - Rozendaal
  - Westervoort
  - Wijchen
  - Zevenaar

=== Abolished municipalities ===
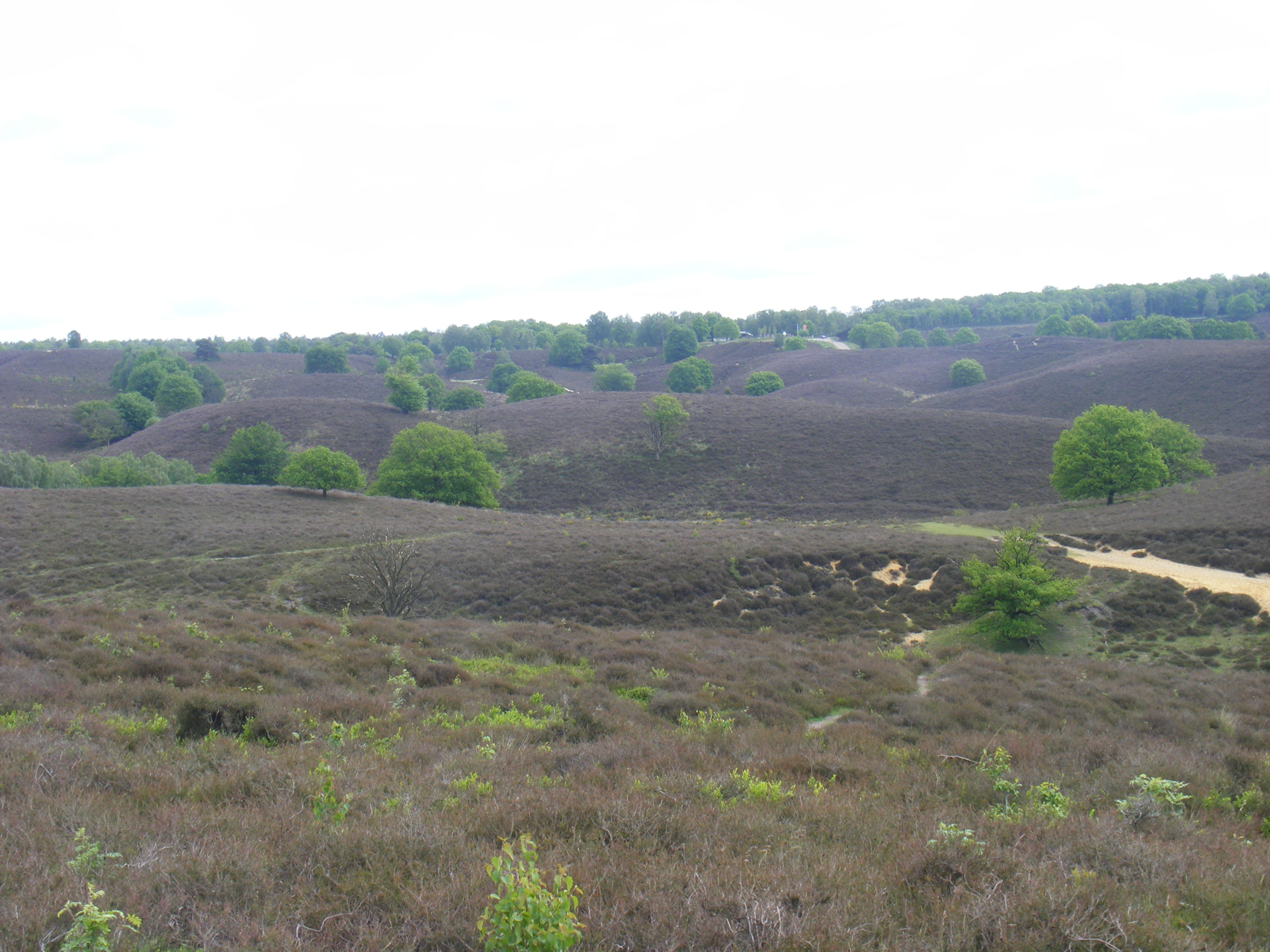
Veluwezoom National Park

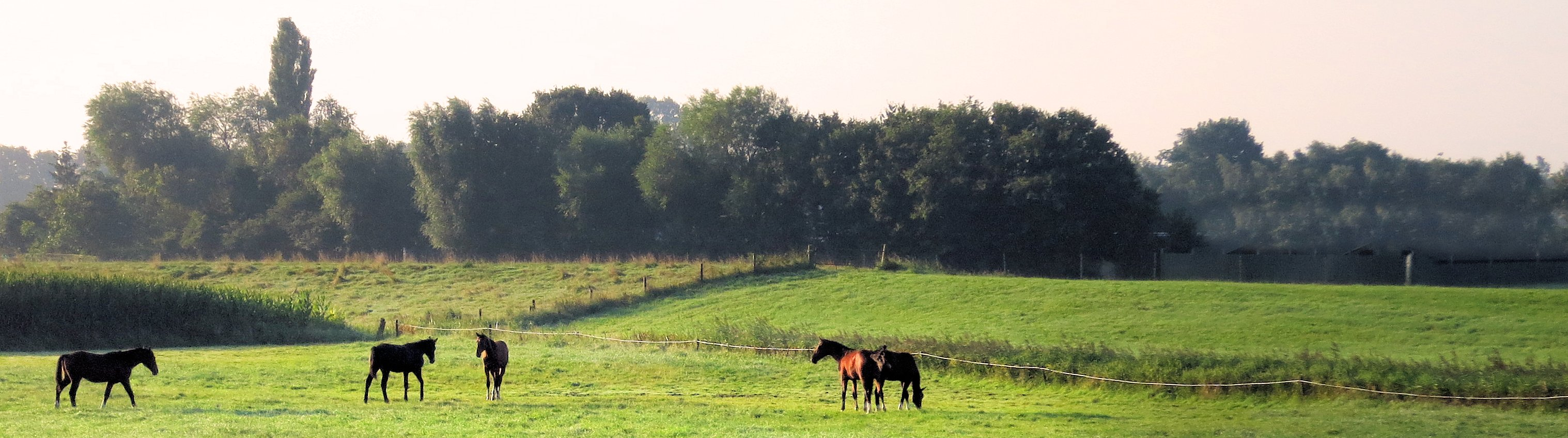
Landscape near Putten

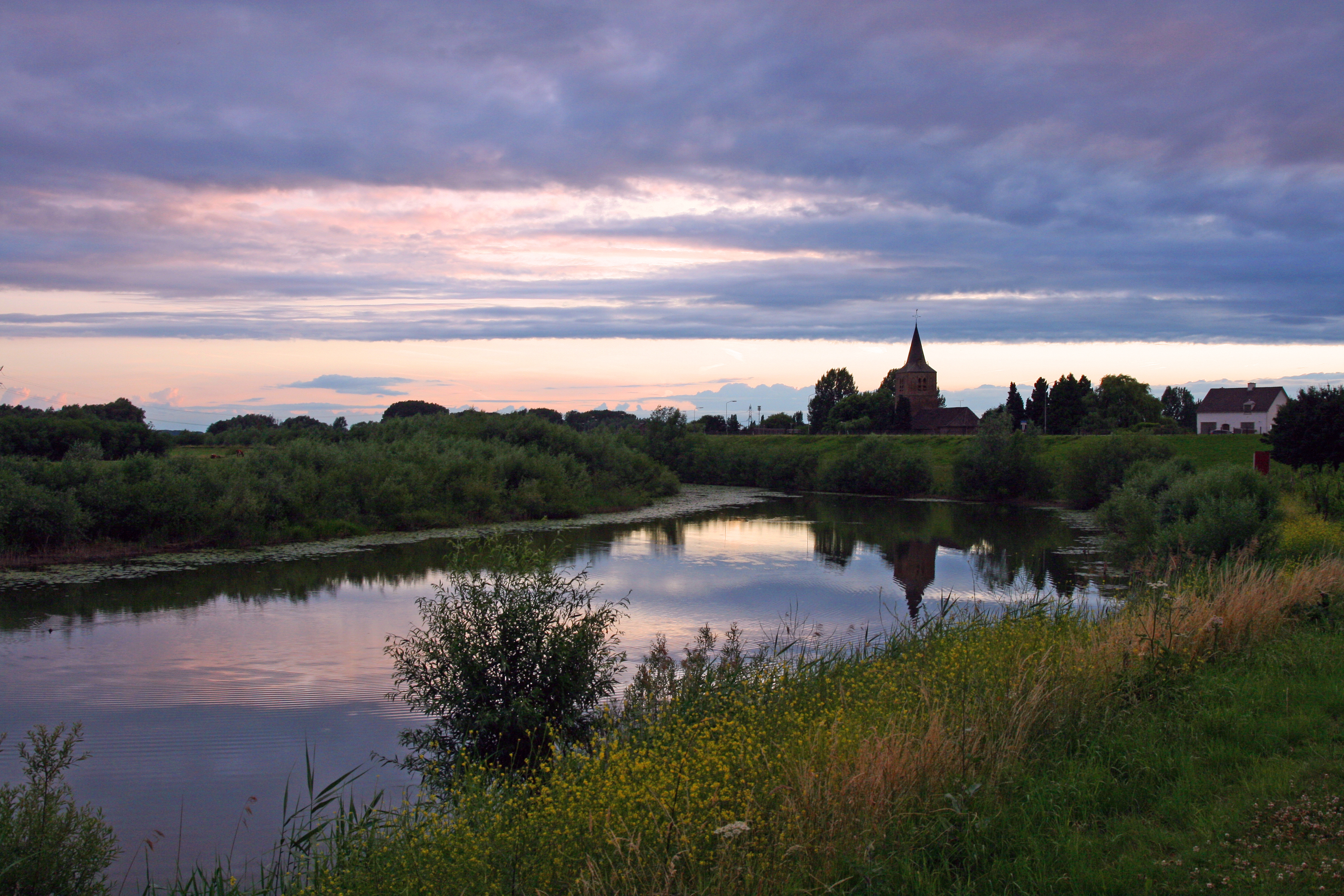
View of Dodewaard

These municipalities were merged with neighbouring ones:

- Angerlo was merged into Zevenaar
- Dinxperlo was merged into Aalten
- Gorssel was merged into Lochem
- Hoevelaken was merged into Nijkerk
- Lichtenvoorde was merged into Groenlo (renamed Oost Gelre in 2006)
- Millingen aan de Rijn and Ubbergen were merged into Groesbeek (renamed Berg en Dal in 2016)
- Rijnwaarden was merged into Zevenaar
- Warnsveld was merged into Zutphen
- Wehl was merged into Doetinchem

These municipalities were merged and given a new name:

- Bergh and Didam have become Montferland
- Borculo, Eibergen, Neede and Ruurlo have become Berkelland
- Geldermalsen, Lingewaal and Neerijnen have become West Betuwe
- Gendringen and Wisch have become Oude IJsselstreek
- Hengelo, Hummelo en Keppel, Steenderen, Vorden and Zelhem have become Bronckhorst
- Huissen, Bemmel and Gendt have become Lingewaard
- Elst, Heteren and Valburg have become Overbetuwe

=== Transport ===
Gelderland has over 5,000 kilometers of cycle paths.

== Economy ==
The gross domestic product (GDP) of the region was €78.3 billion in 2018, accounting for 10.1% of the Netherlands' economic output. GDP per capita adjusted for purchasing power was €33,000 or 110% of the EU27 average in the same year.

== Culture ==
In Gelderland there are many museums, like the Netherlands Open Air Museum and Museum Arnhem in Arnhem, Valkhof Museum in Nijmegen, the Het Loo Palace in Apeldoorn and in Otterlo the Kröller-Müller Museum. There are several large theatres in Gelderland such as the Stadsschouwburg in Nijmegen, Stadstheater in Arnhem and Orpheus (theater) in Apeldoorn. Some cities are also equipped with large concert halls like MUSIS (formerly: Musis sacrum) in Arnhem and Concertgebouw de Vereeniging in Nijmegen. The more widely-known popular music venues are Luxor Live in Arnhem, Doornroosje in Nijmegen, Gigant in Apeldoorn, and the GelreDome stadium in Arnhem. Every year the municipality Renkum and Overbetuwe receive a large amount of tourist visiting because of the Battle of Arnhem. Often historical locations are visited, like the John Frost Bridge and the Arnhem Oosterbeek War Cemetery in Oosterbeek.

== Religion ==
Religion in Gelderland (2015)
1. Not religious (46.3%)
2. Protestant Church in the Netherlands (23.2%)
3. Roman Catholicism (21.6%)
4. Other (5.30%)
5. Islam (3.60%)

In 2015, 23.2% of the population belonged to the Protestant Church in the Netherlands, while 21.6% were Roman Catholic, 3.6% were Muslim, and 5.3% adhered to other churches or faiths. Close to half of the population (46.3%) identified as non-religious.

== Media references ==
In the 2001 movie A Knight's Tale, the protagonist, William Thatcher (played by Heath Ledger) pretends to be a knight known as "Ulrich von Lichtenstein from Gelderland".
