= List of windmills in Gelderland =

List of Dutch windmills

A list of windmills in the Dutch province of Gelderland.

Location	Name of mill	Type	Built	Notes	Photograph
Aalten	De Lelie	Kleine molen	1974	Molendatabase entry (in Dutch)	
Afferden	De Drie Waaien	Stellingmolen	1869	Molendatabase entry (in Dutch)	
Alphen aan de Maas	Tot Vordeel; Genoegen	Standerdmolen	1798	Molendatabase entry (in Dutch)	
Alverna	Schoonoord	Beltmolen	1887	Molendatabase entry (in Dutch)	
Arnhem	Arnhem smock mill (1960)	Grondzeiler	1960	Molendatabase entry (in Dutch). Built at Noordlaren, Groningen in 1862, dismantled in 1953 and re-erected at the Netherlands Open Air Museum in 1960.	
Arnhem	Spinnenkop Openluchtmuseum, Arnhem	Spinnenkop	1925	Molendatabase entry (in Dutch)	
Arnhem	Tjasker Arnhem	Tjasker	2002	Molendatabase entry (in Dutch).Built at Wouterswolde, Friesland in 1928, erected at the Openluchtmuseum in 2002.	
Arnhem	Arnhem post mill (1946)	Kleine Molen	1946	Molendatabase entry (in Dutch)	
Arnhem	De Kroon; Klarendalse Molen	Stellingmolen	1870	Molendatabase entry (in Dutch)	
Arnhem	Het Fortuyn	Stellingmolen	1920	Molendatabase entry (in Dutch). Built at Delft, South Holland in 1696, re-erected at the Openluchtmuseum in 1920.	
Arnhem	Mijn Genoegen; Spinnewiel	Paltrokmolen	1926	Molendatabase entry (in Dutch). Built at Dordrecht, South Holland in 1854, later moved to Numansdorp, South Holland. Re-erected at the Openluchtmuseum in 1926.	
Arnhem	Huizermolen	Open standerdmolen	1916	Molendatabase entry (in Dutch). Built c. 1700 at Huizen, North Holland, re-erected at the Openluchtmuseum in 1916.	
Arnhem	Arnhem post mill (1989)	Kleine molen	1989	Molendatabase entry (in Dutch). Originally built at Wormer, North Holland, moved to Langweer, Friesland during World War One. Re-erected at the Openluchtmuseum in 1989.	
Arnhem	De Hoop	Beltmolen	1846		
Batenburg	Batenburg Windmill	Standerdmolen	18th century	Molendatabase entry (in Dutch)	
Beesd	De Vrijheid	Grondzeiler	18th century	Molendatabase entry (in Dutch)	
Beneden-Leeuwen	De Wielewaal	Stellingmolen	1857	Molendatabase entry (in Dutch)	
Bergharen	De Verrekijker	Beltmolen	1904	Molendatabase entry (in Dutch)	
Beuningen	De Haag	Standerdmolen	1704	Molendatabase entry (in Dutch)	
Braamt	Braamse Molen; Koenders Môl	Grondzeiler	1856	Molendatabase entry (in Dutch)	
Bredevoort	De Prins Van Oranje	Beltmolen	1870	Molendatabase entry (in Dutch)	
Breedenbroek	De Kempermolen	Beltmolen	1882	Molendatabase entry (in Dutch)	
Buren	De Prins Van Oranje	Stellingmolen	1711	Molendatabase entry (in Dutch)	
Culemborg	De Hoop 't Jach	Stellingmolen	1854	Molendatabase entry (in Dutch)	
Culemborg	Johanna; De Korenbloem; De Molen van Schennink	Grondzeiler	1888	Molendatabase entry (in Dutch)	
De Heurne	Teunismolen	Stellingmolen	1822	Molendatabase entry (in Dutch)	
Deil	De Vlinder	Stellingmolen	1931	Molendatabase entry (in Dutch)	
Dichteren	Aurora	Grondzeiler	1870	Molendatabase entry (in Dutch)	
Didam	Sint Martinus	Beltmolen	1855	Molendatabase entry (in Dutch)	
Doetinchem	Benninkmolen; Velsmolen	Stellingmolen	1921	Molendatabase entry (in Dutch)	
Doetinchem	De Walmolen	Stellingmolen	1850	Molendatabase entry (in Dutch)	
Ede	De Keetmolen	Beltmolen	1858	Molendatabase entry (in Dutch)	
Ede	Concordia	Stellingmolen	2008	Molendatabase entry (in Dutch). Built in 1865, sails removed in 1962, Rebuilt in 2008.	
Ede-Doesburgerbuurt	Doesburgermolen	Standerdmolen	c. 1620	Molendatabase entry (in Dutch)	
Elden	De Hoop	Beltmolen	1846	Molendatabase entry (in Dutch)	
Elspeet	De Hoop	Beltmolen	1894	Molendatabase entry (in Dutch)	
Etten	De Witten	Beltmolen	1860	Molendatabase entry (in Dutch)	
Garderen	De Hoop	Stellingmolen	1853	Molendatabase entry (in Dutch)	
Geesteren	De Ster	Stellingmolen	1859	Molendatabase entry (in Dutch)	
Geldermalsen	Geldermalsen smock mill	Grondzeiler	1772	Molendatabase entry (in Dutch)	
Geldermalsen	De Bouwing	Beltmolen	1841	Molendatabase entry (in Dutch)	
Giesbeek	De Hoop	Stellingmolen	1888	Molendatabase entry (in Dutch)	
Gorssel	Gertruida Cornelia	Grondzeiler	1893	Molendatabase entry (in Dutch)	
Groesbeek	De Zuidmolen	Beltmolen	1857	Molendatabase entry (in Dutch)	
Haaften	De Blauwe Reiger	Stellingmolen	1856	Molendatabase entry (in Dutch)	
Harderwijk	De Hoop	Stellingmolen	1998	Molendatabase entry (in Dutch)	
Harreveld	Hermien	Beltmolen	1819	Molendatabase entry (in Dutch)	
Harskamp	Lana Mariana	Beltmolen	1739	Molendatabase entry (in Dutch)	
Hattem	De Fortuin	Stellingmolen	1816	Molendatabase entry (in Dutch)	
Hellouw	Achterse Molen; Laaglandse Molen	Wipmolen	1864	Molendatabase entry (in Dutch)	
Hellouw	't Veertje	Poldermolen		Molendatabase entry (in Dutch)	
Hellouw	Hooglandse Molen	Wipmolen			
Hernen	Hernen Windmill	Beltmolen	1745	Molendatabase entry (in Dutch)	
Herveld	De Vink	Standerdmolen	18th century	Molendatabase entry (in Dutch)	
Heumen	Joannusmolen	Grondzeiler	1894	Molendatabase entry (in Dutch)	
Hulshorst	De Maagd	Stellingmolen	1894	Molendatabase entry (in Dutch)	
Hurwenen	Vento Vivimus	Beltmolen	1875	Molendatabase entry (in Dutch)	
Ingen	Op Hoop Van Beter	Stellingmolen	1893	Molendatabase entry (in Dutch)	
Kekerdom	De Duffelt	Beltmolen	1870	Molendatabase entry (in Dutch)	
Kerkdriel	Sara Catherina	Stellingmolen	1846	Molendatabase entry (in Dutch)	
Kesteren	De Zwaluw	Stellingmolen	2002	Molendatabase entry (in Dutch)	
Klarenbeek	De Hoop	Stellingmolen	1905	Molendatabase entry (in Dutch)	
Laag-Keppel	Follega Molen	Spinnenkop	1969	Molendatabase entry (in Dutch)	
Lienden	De Marsch	Grondzeiler	1885	Molendatabase entry (in Dutch)	
Lienden	De Zwaan	Torenmolen	1644	Molendatabase entry (in Dutch)	
Linde	Ons Belang; Lindesche Molen	Beltmolen	1890	Molendatabase entry (in Dutch)	
Lintelo	Wenninkmolen	Beltmolen	1850	Molendatabase entry (in Dutch)	
Lobith	Tolhuys Coornmolen	Beltmolen	1888	Molendatabase entry (in Dutch)	
Lochem-Zwiep	De Zwiepse Molen	Stellingmolen	1880	Molendatabase entry (in Dutch)	
Loil	De Korenbloem	Beltmolen	1855	Molendatabase entry (in Dutch)	
Lunteren	De Hoop	Grondzeiler	1855	Molendatabase entry (in Dutch)	
Maurik	De Hoop; De Beijenkorf	Stellingmolen	1873	Molendatabase entry (in Dutch)	
Meddo	Sevinkmolen; De Zorg	Beltmolen	1867	Molendatabase entry (in Dutch)	
Miste	Meenkmolen	Beltmolen	1851	Molendatabase entry (in Dutch)	
Nederasselt	De Maasmolen	Standerdmolen	1741	Molendatabase entry (in Dutch)	
Nederhemert	Gebroeders Remmerde	Grondzeiler	c. 1716	Molendatabase entry (in Dutch)	
Neede	De Hollandsche Molen	Stellingmolen	1926	Molendatabase entry (in Dutch)	
Nieuw-Wehl	Bernadette	Grondzeiler	1861	Molendatabase entry (in Dutch)	
Nijkerk-Appel	De Hoop	Stellingmolen	1888	Molendatabase entry (in Dutch)	
Nijmegen	Sint Annamolen	Stellingmolen	1848	Molendatabase entry (in Dutch)	
Nijmegen	Witte Molen; Looimolen	Stellingmolen	1760	Molendatabase entry (in Dutch)	
Nunspeet	De Duif	Beltmolen	1886	Molendatabase entry (in Dutch)	
Oene	Werklust	Stellingmolen	1858	Molendatabase entry (in Dutch)	
Oldebroek	De Hoop	Stellingmolen	1853	Molendatabase entry (in Dutch)	
Oostendorp	De Tijd	Stellingmolen	1854	Molendatabase entry (in Dutch)	
Oud-Zevenaar	De Hoop	Stellingmolen	1850	Molendatabase entry (in Dutch)	
Overasselt	Zeldenrust	Standerdmolen	1972	Molendatabase entry (in Dutch). Built at Geertruidenberg, North Brabant in 1736, moved to Raamsdonksveer in 1890, moved here in 1972.	
Putten	Het Hert	Stellingmolen	1899	Molendatabase entry (in Dutch)	
Rekken	De Piepermolen	Beltmolen	1796	Molendatabase entry (in Dutch)	
Rha	De Hoop	Beltmolen	1879	Molendatabase entry (in Dutch)	
Rijswijk	De Hoop	Grondzeiler	18th century	Molendatabase entry (in Dutch)	
Ruurlo	Agneta	Stellingmolen	1851	Molendatabase entry (in Dutch)	
Silvolde	Gerritsens Molen	Grondzeiler	1856	Molendatabase entry (in Dutch)	
Steenderen	Bronkhorstermolen	Beltmolen	1844	Molendatabase entry (in Dutch)	
Stokkum	Düffels Möll	Grondzeiler	1861	Molendatabase entry (in Dutch)	
Terschuur	Kallenbroeker Molen; Den Ouden Florus	Standerdmolen	c. 1584	Molendatabase entry (in Dutch)	
Terwolde	De Ooievaar; Holtermansmolen	Stellingmolen	1987	Struck by lightning and burnt down, 31 August 1015. Molendatabase entry (in Dutch)	
Twello	Havekes Mölle; De Volharding	Stellingmolen	1898	Molendatabase entry (in Dutch)	
Vaassen	Daams' Molen	Stellingmolen	1990	Molendatabase entry (in Dutch). Built in 1870, demolished in 1934, reconstructed in 1990.	
Valburg	Nieuwe Leven	Standerdmolen	1750	Molendatabase entry (in Dutch).	
Varik	De Bol	Stellingmolen	1867	Molendatabase entry (in Dutch)	
Varsseveld	De Engel	Stellingmolen	1850	Molendatabase entry (in Dutch)	
Veessen	Mölle van Bats	Stellingmolen	1779	Molendatabase entry (in Dutch)	
Voorst	De Zwaan	Stellingmolen	1904	Molendatabase entry (in Dutch)	
Vorden	De Hoop	Stellingmolen	1850	Molendatabase entry (in Dutch)	
Vorden	Hackforter Mölen; Op 't Hoge	Stellingmolen	1851	Molendatabase entry (in Dutch)	
Vragender	De Vier Winden	Stellingmolen	1958	Molendatabase entry (in Dutch)	
Waardenburg	Waardenburg Windmill (1867)	Grondzeiler	1867	Molendatabase entry (in Dutch)	
Waardenburg	Waardenburg Windmill	Grondzeiler	18th century	Molendatabase entry (in Dutch)	
Wadenoijen	Wadenoijen Windmill	Grondzeiler	1888	Molendatabase entry (in Dutch)	
Wageningen	De Vlijt	Stellingmolen	1879	Molendatabase entry (in Dutch)	
Walderveen	De Walderveense Molen	Stellingmolen	1912	Molendatabase entry (in Dutch)	
Wapenveld	De Vlijt	Grondzeiler	1984	Molendatabase entry (in Dutch)	
Wapenveld	De Wielwaal	Grondzeiler	1959	Molendatabase entry (in Dutch)	
Warken	De Warkense Molen	Grondzeiler	1878	Molendatabase entry (in Dutch)	
Warnsveld	Nooit Gedacht	Stellingmolen	1905	Molendatabase entry (in Dutch)	
Wenum	Wenum Windmill	Grondzeiler	1913	Molendatabase entry (in Dutch). Built at Baambrugge in 1840, moved here in 1913.	
Wijchen	De Oude Molen	Beltmolen	1799	Molendatabase entry (in Dutch)	
Wilp-Posterenk	Wilpermolen	Stellingmolen	1766	Molendatabase entry (in Dutch)	
Winsen	Beatrixmolen	Beltmolen	1848	Molendatabase entry (in Dutch). Built at Alphen aan den Maas in 1791, moved here in 1848.	
Winterswijk	Venemansmolen; De Oude Molen	Stellingmolen	1898	Molendatabase entry (in Dutch)	
Winterswijk	De Bataaf	Stellingmolen			
Zeddam	Grafelijke Korenmolen	Torenmolen	c. 1441	Molendatabase entry (in Dutch)	
Zeddam	De Volharding	beltmolen	1891	Molendatabase entry (in Dutch)	
Zelhem-Wittebrink	Wittebrinkse Molen	Beltmolen	1890	Molendatabase entry (in Dutch)	
Zevenaar	De Buitenmolen	Torenmolen	16th century	Molendatabase entry (in Dutch)	
Zoelen	De Korenbloem	Grondzeiler	1775	Molendatabase entry (in Dutch)	
Zuilichem	Zuilichem smock mill	Grondzeiler	1700	Molendatabase entry (in Dutch)	
Zuilichem	De Hoop	Stellingmolen	1863	Molendatabase entry (in Dutch)	
