= Arnhem post mill (1989) =

Dutch windmill

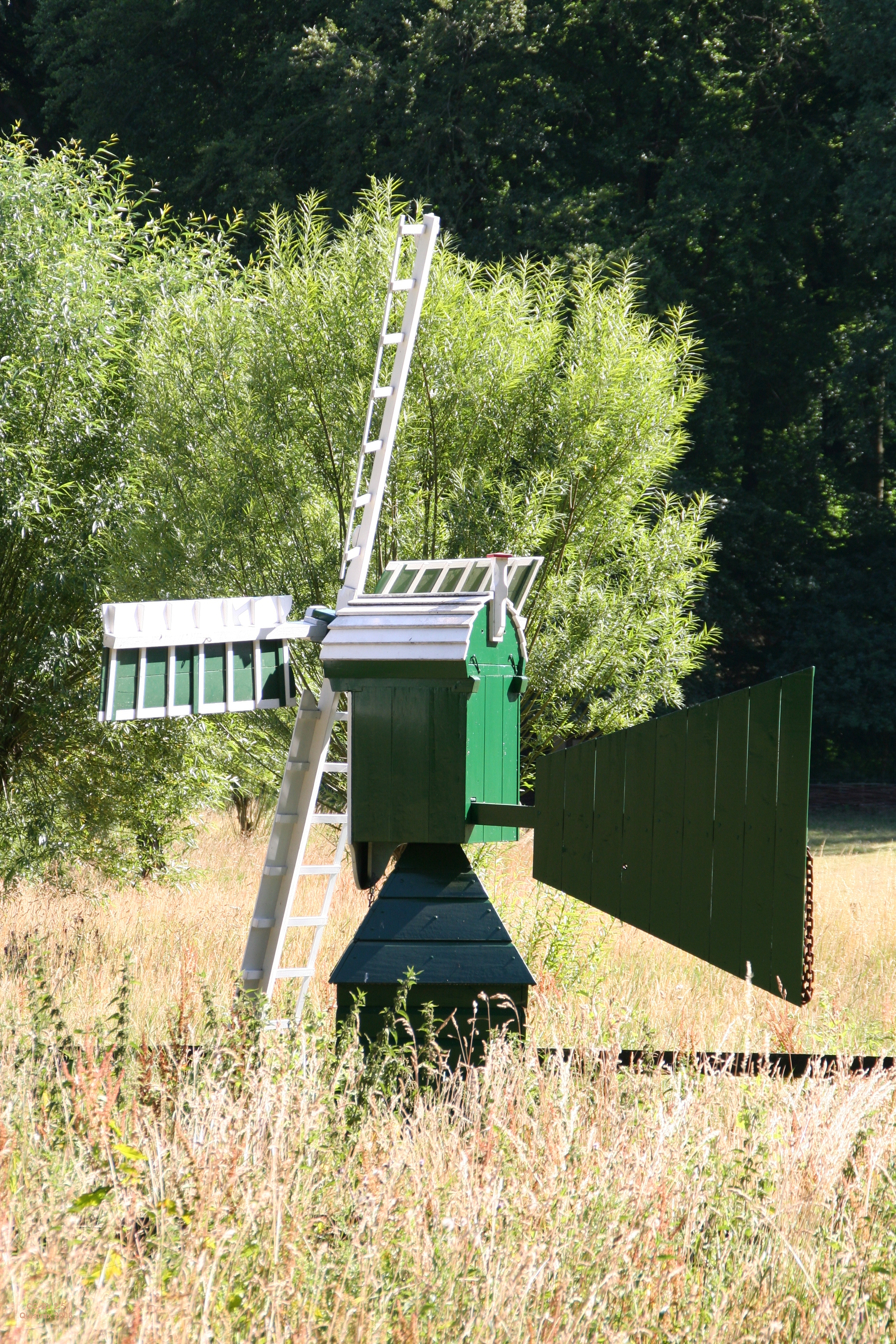
- The mill in July 2006.

Origin
- Mill location: Schelmseweg 89, 6816 SJ, Arnhem
- Coordinates: 52°00′37″N 5°54′33″E
- Operator(s): Netherlands Open Air Museum
- Year built: 1989

Information
- Purpose: Drainage mill
- Type: Hollow post mill
- No. of sails: Four sails
- Type of sails: Common sails
- Windshaft: Wood
- Winding: Tail vane
- Type of pump: Centrifugal pump

A hollow post mill at the Netherlands Open Air Museum, Arnhem, Gelderland, Netherlands was originally built at Wormer, North Holland, Netherlands. During World War I, it was moved to Langweer, Friesland. It was dismantled in 1960 and re-erected at the museum in 1989. The mill has been restored to working order.

== History ==
The mill was originally built at Wormer, North Holland, Netherlands. During World War I, it was moved to Langweer, Friesland. It was dismantled in 1960 and re-erected at the Netherlands Open Air Museum, Arnhem, Gelderland in 1989. The mill was severely damaged in a snowstorm in 2000. It was restored in 2003.

== Description ==
The mill is what the Dutch describe as a Weidemolen (English: Meadow mill). It is a small hollow post mill on a roundhouse. The mill is winded by tail vane. The buck and roundhouse are covered in boards. The sails are Common sails. They have a span of 3.85 metres (12 ft 8 in). The sails are carried on a wooden windshaft. The windshaft carries the brake wheel which has 21 cogs. This drives the wallower (9 cogs) at the top of the upright shaft. At the bottom of the upright shaft a centrifugal pump is driven.

== Public access ==
The mill can be viewed externally during museum opening hours.

== See also ==
Windmills in Arnhem

- De Hoop
- De Kroon

Windmills in the Netherlands Open Air Museum

- Boktjasjker
- Het Fortuyn
- Huizermolen
- Mijn Genoegen
- Spinnenkop
- Arnhem post mill (1946)
- Arnhem smock mill (1960)
