= Arnhem smock mill (1960) =

Dutch windmill

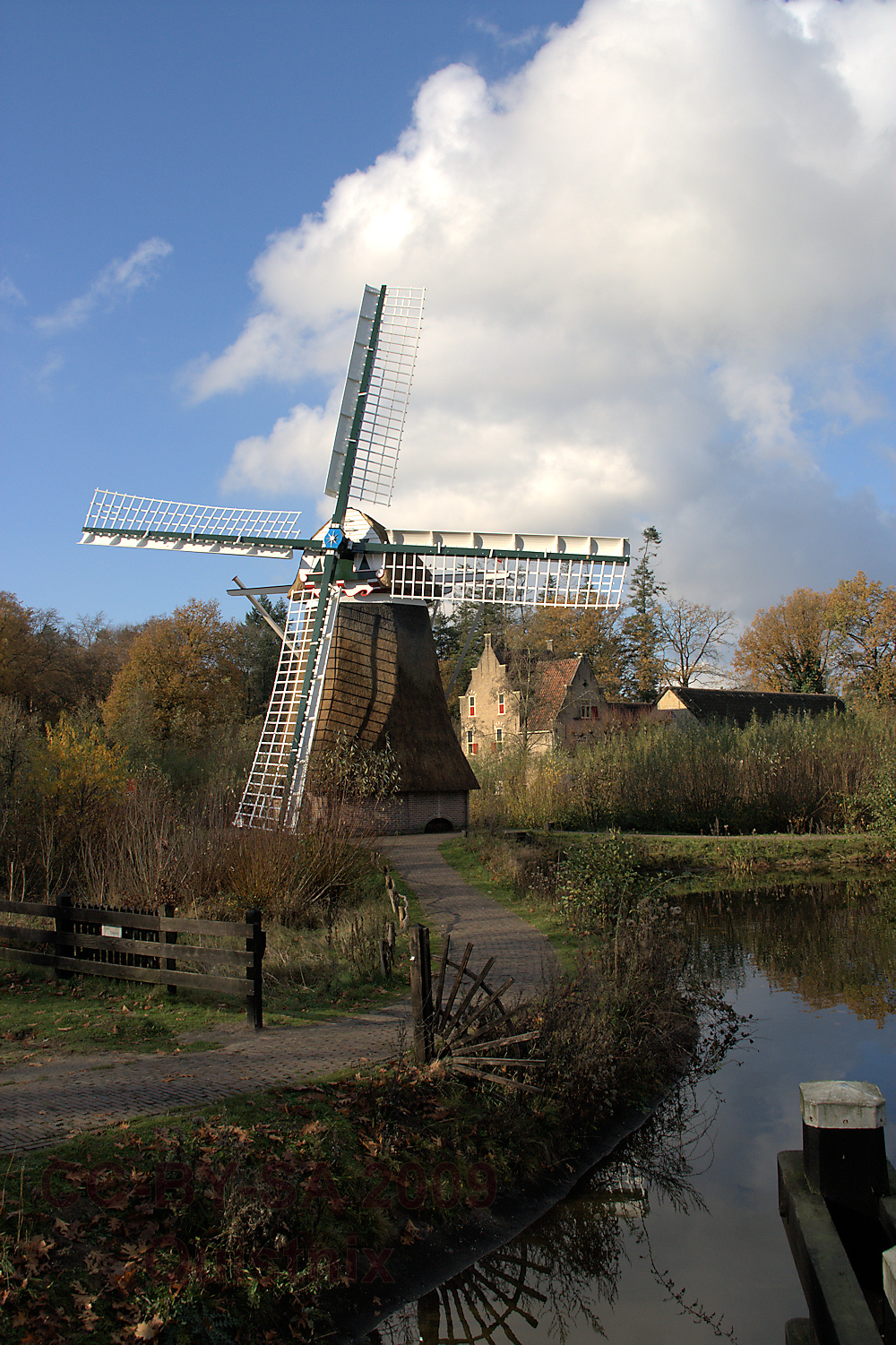
- The mill in November 2009.

Origin
- Mill location: Schelmseweg 89, 6816 SJ, Arnhem
- Coordinates: 52°00′40″N 5°54′31″E
- Operator(s): Netherlands Open Air Museum
- Year built: 1960

Information
- Purpose: Drainage mill
- Type: Smock mill
- Storeys: Two storey smock
- Base storeys: One storey base
- Smock sides: Eight sides
- No. of sails: Four sails
- Type of sails: Common sails, Fok system on leading edges.
- Windshaft: Cast iron
- Winding: Tailpole and winch
- Type of pump: Archimedes' screw

The smock mill at the Netherlands Open Air Museum, Arnhem, Gelderland, Netherlands was originally built at Noordlaren, Groningen, Netherlands in 1862. It was dismantled in 1953 and re-erected at the museum in 1960. The mill has been restored to working order.

== History ==
The mill was originally built to drain the Oosterpolder at Noordlaren, Groningen in 1862, replacing an earlier mill. In 1895, the upper part of the wooden upright shaft was replaced by one of cast iron, made by the IJzergieterij De Prins van Oranje, The Hague, South Holland. At that time, one pair of Common sails were replaced by Patent sails. Later, the mill ran with four Patent sails. In 1913, a steam-powered pumping station was constructed to assist the drainage of the polder during periods of calm. Electricity replaced steam in 1939. In 1942, it was proposed to demolish the mill, but this was postponed due to World War II. Post-war, the polder board and the Gemeente Haren disagreed over the proposal to demolish the mill. A licence to demolish was issued on 17 January 1951. The mill was dismantled in 1953 and moved to Arnhem.

The mill was rebuilt in 1960, incorporating the base of a demolished windmill from Spijkerboor. The Patent sails were replaced with Common sails, but the mill was not returned to working order. This did not occur until 1995 when the mill was restored. The sails were fitted with the Fok system on their leading edges.

== Description ==
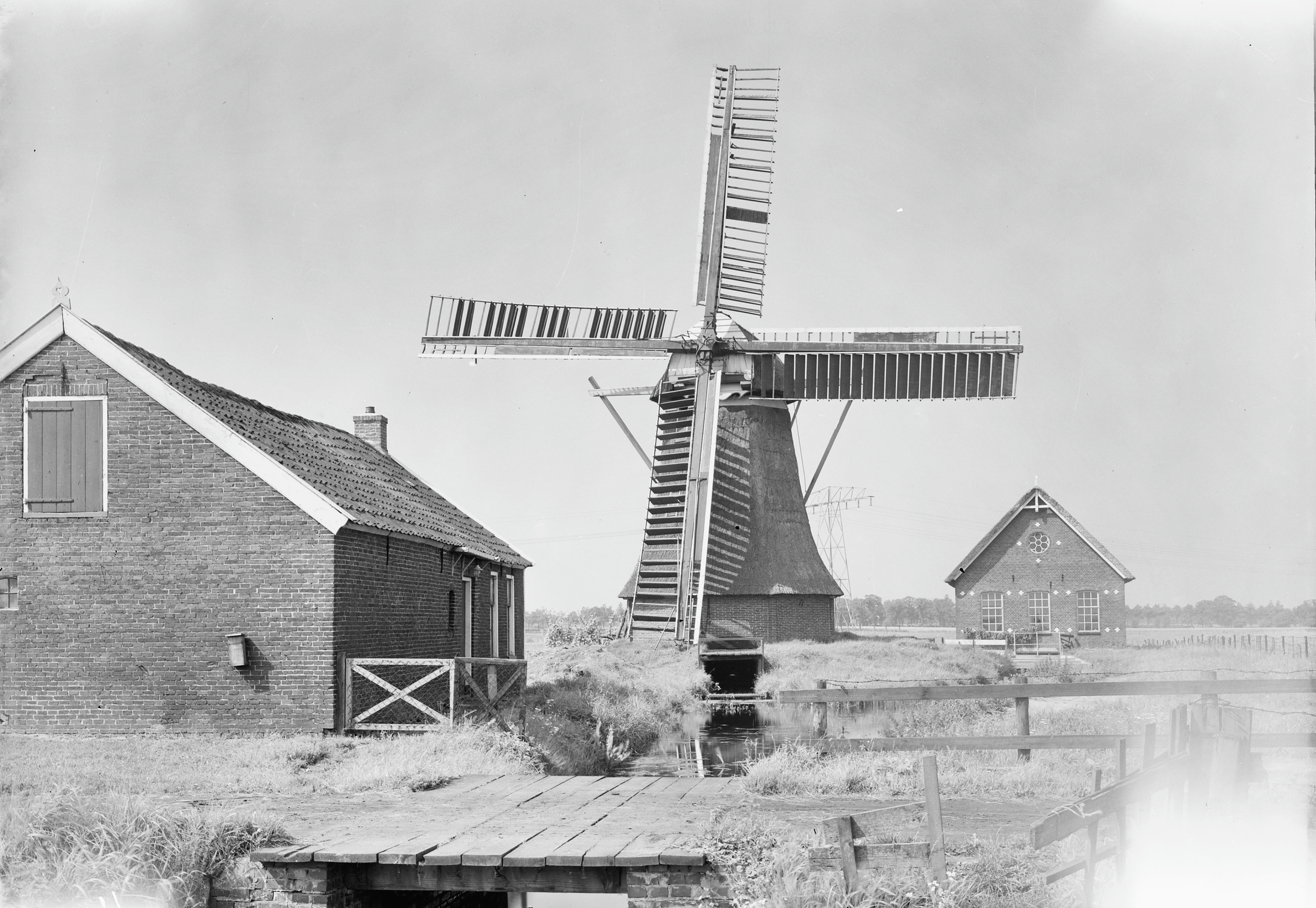
The mill at Noordlaren, August 1942.

The mill is what the Dutch describe as a Grondzeiler. It is a two-storey smock mill on a single-storey base. There is no stage, the sails reaching almost to ground level. The mill is winded by tailpole and winch. The smock and cap are thatched. The sails are Common sails, fitted with the Fok system on their leading edges. They have a span of 19.90 metres (65 ft 3 in). The sails are carried on a cast-iron windshaft which was cast by the IJzergieterij De Prins van Oranje, The Hague, South Holland in 1960. The windshaft carries the wooden brake wheel which has 48 cogs. This drives the wallower (29 cogs) at the top of the upright shaft. At the bottom of the upright shaft there are two crown wheels. The upper crown wheel, which has 40 cogs drives an Archimedes' screw via a crown wheel. The lower crown wheel, which has 35 cogs is carried on the axle of the Archimedes' screw.

== Public access ==
The mill is open during museum opening hours.

== See also ==
Windmills in Arnhem

- De Hoop
- De Kroon

Windmills in the Netherlands Open Air Museum

- Boktjasjker
- Het Fortuyn
- Huizermolen
- Mijn Genoegen
- Spinnenkop
- Arnhem post mill (1946)
- Arnhem post mill (1989)
