= Spinnenkop Openluchtmuseum, Arnhem =

Dutch windmill

Spinnenkop Openluchtmuseum
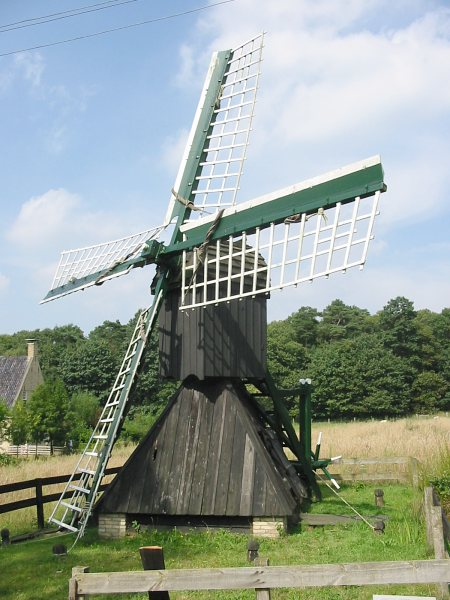
- Spinnenkop in the Dutch Open Air Museum
- Interactive map of Spinnenkop Openluchtmuseum

Origin
- Mill location: Dutch Open Air Museum, Arnhem
- Coordinates: 52.012193°N 5.915032°E
- Operator: Nederlands Openluchtmuseum
- Year built: ca 1800/1925

Information
- Purpose: Drainage mill
- Type: Hollow post
- Roundhouse storeys: Single storey roundhouse
- No. of sails: Four sails
- Type of sails: Patent sails
- Windshaft: Wooden
- Winding: Tailpole and winch
- Type of pump: Archimedes' screw

The spinnenkop of the Netherlands Open Air Museum in Arnhem is a small drainage mill originally located near Gorredijk, Friesland, Netherlands. It is a hollow post windmill that has been restored to working order.

== History ==
The mill was built around 1800 and later moved to Gorredijk. Next to draining the polder it got a secondary use from 1886 onwards to inundate the local ice skating ring. It was named Molen van Posthuman after its owner or named after the polder it drained called Mountsjelân (English: little mill land). In 1922 it became superfluous when a kerosene-engine powered pumping station was built. The mill was then dismantled and given to the Dutch Open Air Museum where it was rebuilt in 1925.

== Description ==
The spinnenkop (English: spiderhead mill) of the Netherlands Open Air Museum is a small hollow post mill winded by a winch. The mill has common sails. The wooden stocks have a span of 13 metres (42 ft 8 in) and 9.50 metres (31 ft 2 in) and are carried on a wooden windshaft. The brake wheel on the windshaft drives the wallower at the top of the upright shaft in the body (called head on a spinnenkop), which passed through the main post into the substructure. At the bottom of the upright shaft is the crown wheel which drives the wooden Archimedes' screw. The body (called head on a spinnenkop) and substructure are weatherboarded. Though fully operational the windmill can rarely be used to pump water because of its current sheltered location.

== Public access ==
The mill can be approached closely during opening hours of the museum.

== See also ==
Windmills in Arnhem

- De Hoop
- De Kroon

Windmills in the Netherlands Open Air Museum

- Boktjasjker
- Het Fortuyn
- Huizermolen
- Mijn Genoegen
- Arnhem post mill (1946)
- Arnhem post mill (1989)
- Arnhem smock mill (1960)
