= Het Fortuyn, Arnhem =

Dutch windmill

Het Fortuyn, De Arnhem
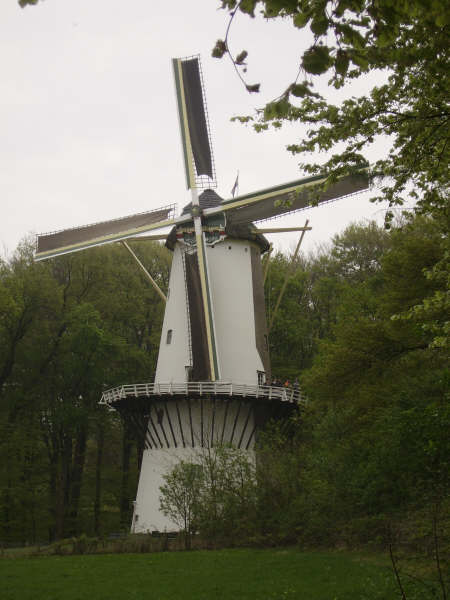
- Het Fortuyn, August 2007
- Interactive map of Het Fortuyn, De Arnhem

Origin
- Mill name: Het Fortuyn
- Mill location: Schelsmseweg 89, 6816 SJ, Arnhem
- Coordinates: 52°00′34″N 5°54′41″E
- Operator: Netherlands Open Air Museum
- Year built: 1920

Information
- Purpose: Corn mill and pearl barley mill
- Type: Tower mill
- Storeys: Six storey tower
- No. of sails: Four sails
- Type of sails: Common sails
- Windshaft: Cast iron
- Winding: Tailpole and winch
- No. of pairs of millstones: Five pairs
- Size of millstones: Three pairs 1.60 metres (5 ft 3 in) diameter, One pair 1.50 metres (4 ft 11 in) diameter

Het Fortuyn (English: The Fortune) is a tower mill in the Netherlands Open Air Museum, located in Arnhem, Gelderland, Netherlands which was built in 1920 and is in working order.

== History ==
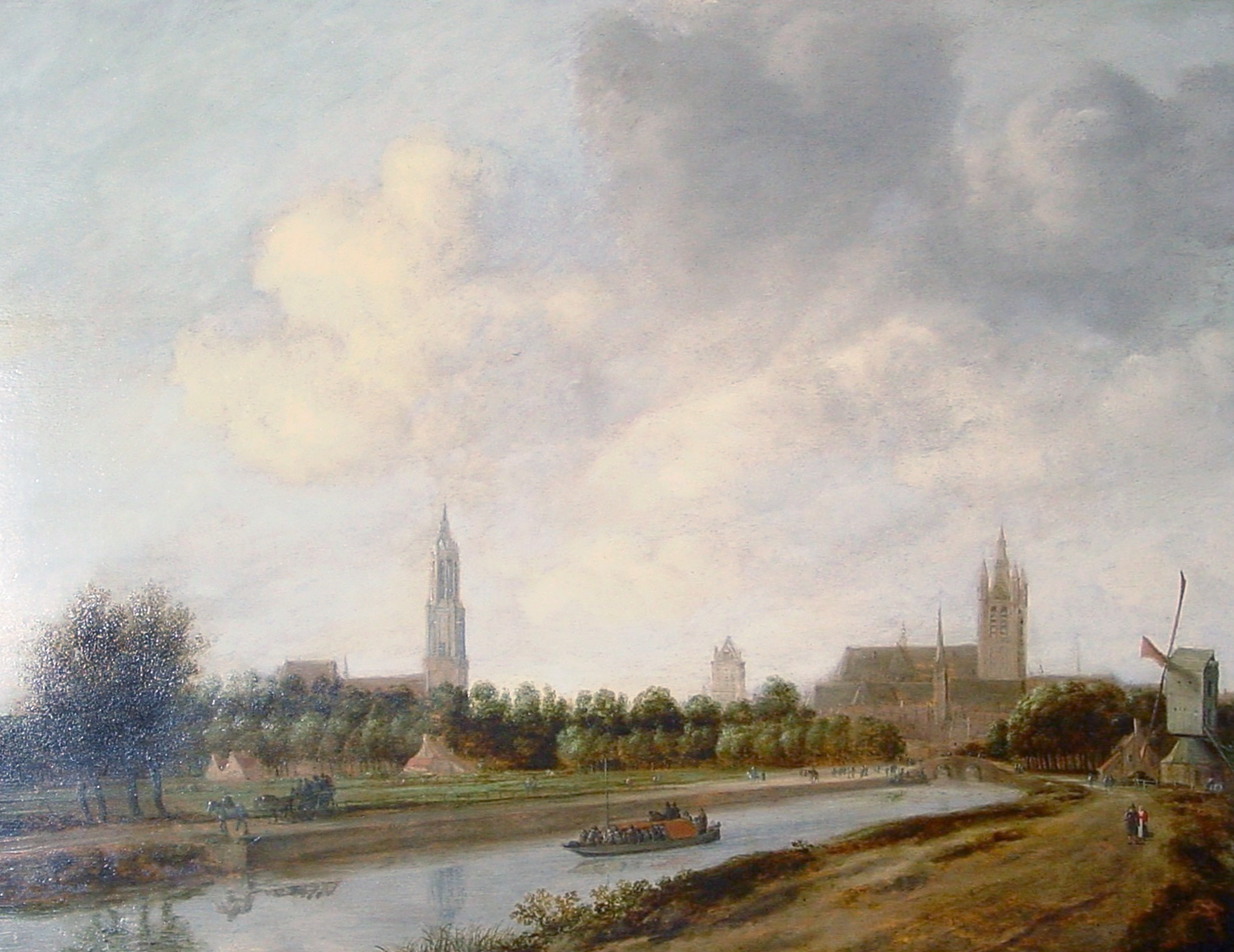
Slikmolen, 1647.

Het Fortuyn was originally built at Delft, South Holland in 1696. The first mill on that site was a post mill built in 1551 and demolished during the Eighty Years' War. Permission was granted in 1603 for a replacement mill to be erected. This was also a post mill, known as the Slikmolen. It is shown in the painting Gezicht op Delft gezien vanuit het noorden by Hendrik Cornelisz Vroom. The painting is in the Museum Het Prinsenhof, Delft. Het Fortuyn was thus the third mill on this site. Circa 1800, the mill was still known as the Slikmolen, gaining the name Het Fortuyn between 1807 and 1817. The mill drove four pairs of millstones. In 1873, a pair of millstones for the production of pearl barley was added. In the late 19th century the mill was owned by the Rossum family, and was also known as the Molen van Rossum. In the early 20th century, the Frans-Hollandse Oliefabrieken Calvé and the Nederlandsche Gist- en Spiritusfabriek purchased the mill as they were expanding their oil mills. The mill was dismantled in 1917. It was re-erected at the Netherlands Open Air Museum, Arnhem in 1920. The mill's windshaft was broken during the dismantling of the mill. A new one was procured for use in the re-erected mill. The costs of demolishing and re-erecting the mill were shared between the oil mills and the Gemeente Arnhem.

The mill was not restored to working order and its condition deteriorated over time. In 1975, it was restored so that it could turn in the wind. A pair of millstones were restored to working order at a later date. In 1990, the cement rendering was restored to the mill, covering the north, west and south of the tower, as it was when the mill stood in Delft. The mill was restored in 2011-12, with a new stage, cap and sails.

== Description ==
Het Fortuyn is what the Dutch describe as a "Ronde stellingmolen". It is a six-storey tower mill with a stage. The stage in 10.00 metres (32 ft 10 in) above ground level. The cap is thatched. The mill is winded by tailpole and winch. The sails are Common sails. They have a span of 26.50 metres (86 ft 11 in). The sails are carried on a cast-iron windshaft, which was cast by the IJzergieterij De Prins van Oranje, The Hague, South Holland. The windshaft also carries the brake wheel which has 92 teeth. This drives a lantern pinion wallower, which has 35 staves, and is located at the top of the upright shaft At the bottom of the upright shaft is the great spur wheel, which has 86 teeth. This drives five pairs of millstones via lantern pinion stone nuts. which have 32 staves each, apart from that driving the pearl barley stones, which has 24 staves. Three pairs are 1.60 metres (5 ft 3 in) diameter Cullen millstones, and one pair are 1.50 metres (4 ft 11 in) Cullens.

== Public access ==
Het Fortuyn is open during museum opening hours.

== See also ==
Windmills in Arnhem

- De Hoop
- De Kroon

Windmills in the Netherlands Open Air Museum

- Boktjasjker
- Huizermolen
- Mijn Genoegen
- Spinnenkop
- Arnhem post mill (1946)
- Arnhem post mill (1989)
- Arnhem smock mill (1960)
