= Mijn Genoegen, Arnhem =

Dutch windmill

Mijn Genoegen
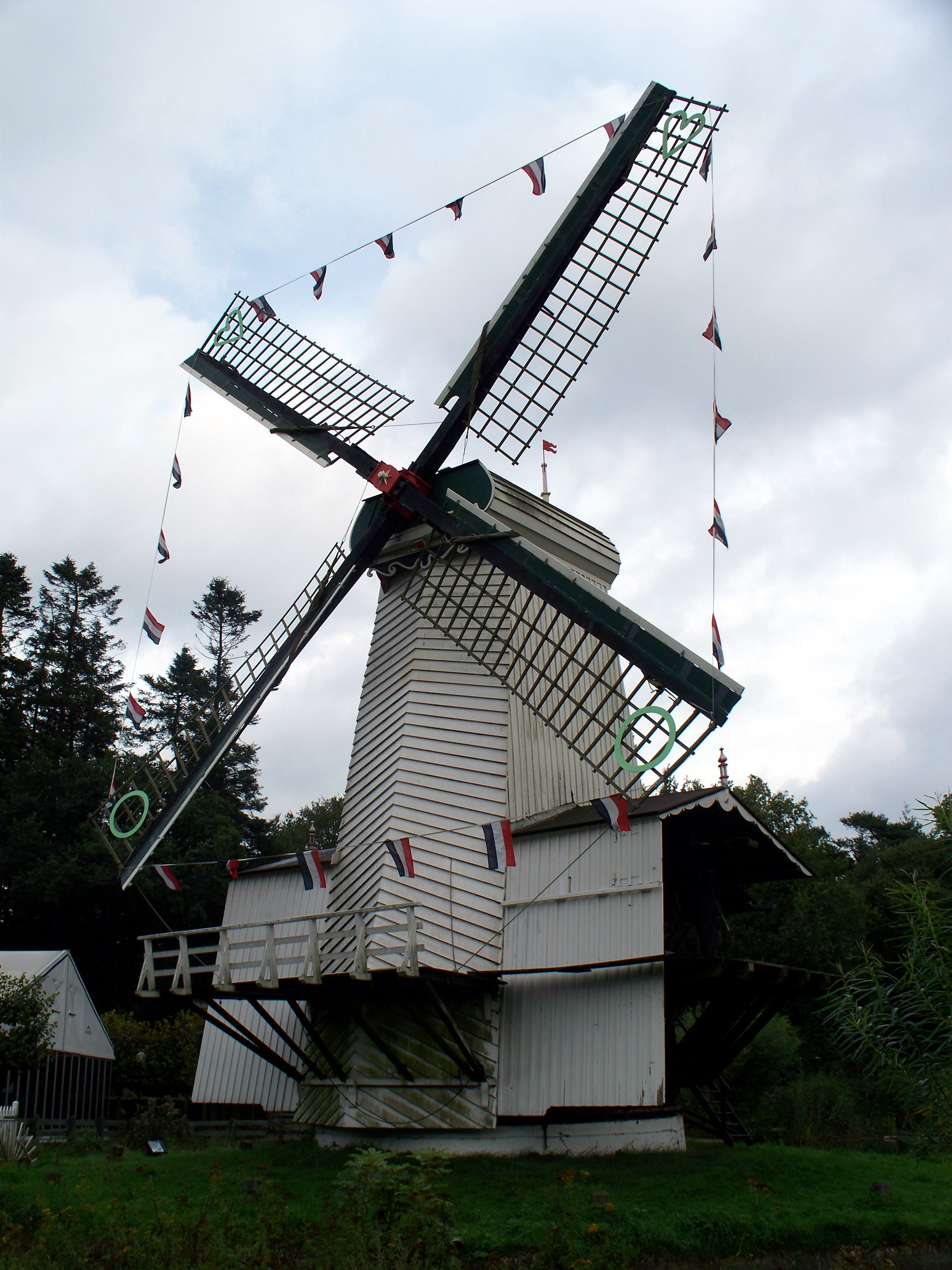
- Mijn Genoegen, 2008

Origin
- Mill name: Mijn Genoegen
- Mill location: Netherlands Open Air Museum, Schelmseweg 89 6816 SJ Arnhem
- Coordinates: 52.011610°N 5.908718°E
- Operator(s): Netherlands Open Air Museum
- Year built: 1928

Information
- Purpose: Sawmill
- Type: Paltrok mill
- No. of sails: Four sails
- Type of sails: Common sails
- Windshaft: Cast iron
- Winding: Tailpole and winch
- Auxiliary power: Electric motor
- Other information: Three vertical frame saws

Mijn Genoegen (English: My Pleasure) is a paltrok mill in the Netherlands Open Air Museum in Arnhem, Gelderland, Netherlands which has been restored to working order. As are all Dutch paltrok mills, it is a wind-powered sawmill.

== History ==
The windmill was built around 1680 in Dordrecht, where it was known as Het Spinnewiel (English: The spinning-wheel). In 1854 the mill was moved to Numansdorp and the name was changed to Mijn Genoegen (English: My pleasure). Two of the three wooden sawing frames were replaced by cast iron frames in 1854; the wooden windshaft was replaced with cast iron in 1887. In Numansdorp the mill was continuously owned by the Verboom family until the museum bought the mill in good condition from the owner.

It was re-erected in Arnhem in 1928. The mill was damaged in World War II during Operation Market Garden. Prior to repairs in 1946, it was moved to a different site on the museum grounds, where it served as a static display. In the late 1980s, it received a major restoration to working order.

== Description ==
Mijn Genoegen is a Dutch paltrok mill - a wooden mill supported on a short central post and a ring of wooden rollers on a low brick base, designed specifically for sawing wood. The mill body is boarded; however, the sawing floor is open on three sides with only the windward facing side and the side roofs giving protection against the weather. The entire mill is winded by a tailpole and winch. On the front is a stage, 2.90 metres (9 ft 6 in) above ground for setting the sails. The sails are common sails with a span of 17.50 metres (57 ft 5 in). They are carried on a cast-iron windshaft cast by Penn & Bauduin of Dordrecht. The function of the brake wheel is split between two wheels, one wheel with a flat outer rim for the brake blocks to work on and another wheel with 55 radial cogs driving the lantern wheel with 25 iron staves on the horizontal crank shaft. There is no upright shaft. Connecting rods from the three crank pins drive the sawing frames. Reciprocating lever bars also drive the pawl and ratchet mechanisms which in turn drive the winches and the feeding mechanism of the log carriages through rack and pinion mechanisms. The winches can be used with the log hoist to lift logs from the water onto the sawing platform and to pull the log carriages back to their starting position.

The mill cannot catch enough wind in its sheltered location to enable wind-powered sawing. To demonstrate the sawing process to the public, the crankshaft is powered by an electric motor. The cogs of the brake wheel have been removed so the sails can be turned by the wind independently of the electric-powered saws.

== Public access ==
The mill can be visited during opening hours of the museum. The miller is mostly on site on Wednesdays.

== See also ==
Windmills in Arnhem

- De Hoop
- De Kroon

Windmills in the Netherlands Open Air Museum

- Boktjasjker
- Het Fortuyn
- Huizermolen
- Spinnenkop
- Arnhem post mill (1946)
- Arnhem post mill (1989)
- Arnhem smock mill (1960)
