= Huizermolen, Arnhem =

Dutch windmill

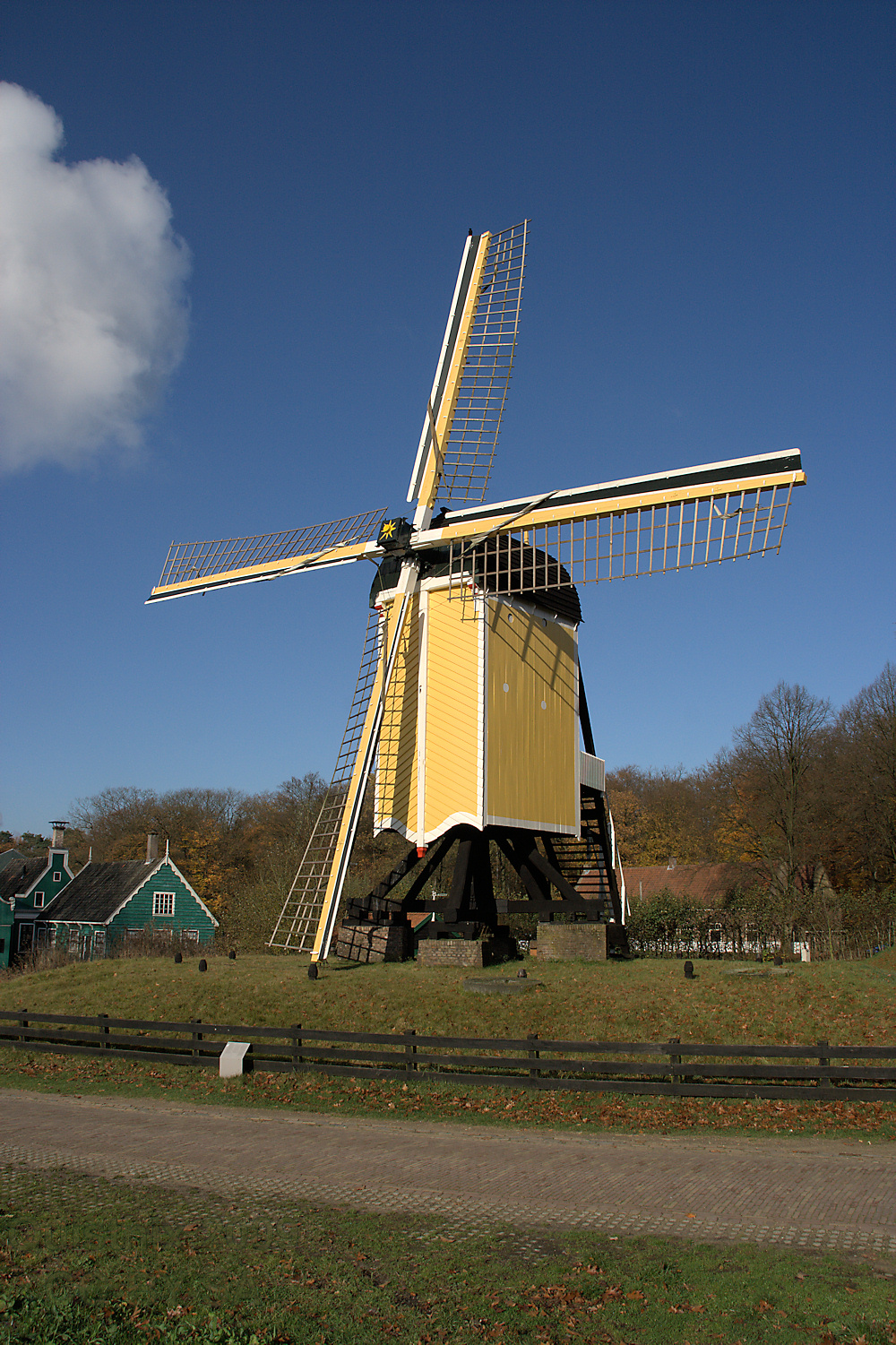
- Huizermolen, November 2009

Origin
- Mill name: Huizermolen
- Mill location: Schelmseweg 89, 6816 SJ, Arnhem
- Coordinates: 52°00′39″N 5°54′38″E
- Operator(s): Netherlands Open Air Museum
- Year built: 1919

Information
- Purpose: Corn mill
- Type: Post mill
- Roundhouse storeys: Formerly a single storey roundhouse
- No. of sails: Four sails
- Type of sails: Common sails
- Windshaft: Wood
- Winding: Tailpole and winch
- No. of pairs of millstones: Two pairs
- Size of millstones: 1.50 metres (4 ft 11 in) diameter

Huizermolen is a post mill in the Netherlands Open Air Museum, Arnhem, Netherlands which was built in 1919 and is in working order.

== History ==
The Huizermolen was built c. 1665 at Huizen. It had a single storey roundhouse there. A beam in the mill bore the date 1758. The mill was dismantled in 1916 and re-erected at the Netherlands Open Air Museum, Arnhem in 1919. It was one of the first buildings to be re-erected at the museum. The mill had a roundhouse at this time. In 1949, the mill was repaired using parts from a mill at Mussel, Groningen that had been demolished in 1943. The trestle from that mill was installed, but the mill was not then in working order. At this restoration, the roundhouse was removed.

The mill was restored in 1975-76 by millwright De Ruiter of Elspeet, Gelderland. This amounted to a complete rebuild of the mill, with only the trestle being retained from the old mill. A new wooden windshaft and sails were fitted. The mill was in need of a new windshaft and sails in 2011. Restoration began in March 2012. The restored mill was set to work on 26 January 2013.

== Description ==
Huizermolen is what the Dutch describe as a "Standerdmolen". It is an open trestle post mill. The mill is winded by tailpole and winch. The sails are Common sails. They have a span of 22.00 metres (72 ft 2 in). The sails are carried on a wooden windshaft. The windshaft also carries the brake wheel which has 68 teeth. This drives a lantern pinion stone nut which has 14 staves and drives a pair of 1.50 metres (4 ft 11 in) Cullen millstones, the brake wheel from the mill at Mussel being retained. The tail wheel has 68 teeth.

== Public access ==
Huizermolen is open for external viewing during museum opening times. Access to the mill may generally be gained on Sundays, or whenever the mill is working.

== See also ==
Windmills in Arnhem

- De Hoop
- De Kroon

Windmills in the Netherlands Open Air Museum

- Boktjasjker
- Het Fortuyn
- Mijn Genoegen
- Spinnenkop
- Arnhem post mill (1946)
- Arnhem post mill (1989)
- Arnhem smock mill (1960)
