= Arnhem post mill (1946) =

Dutch windmill

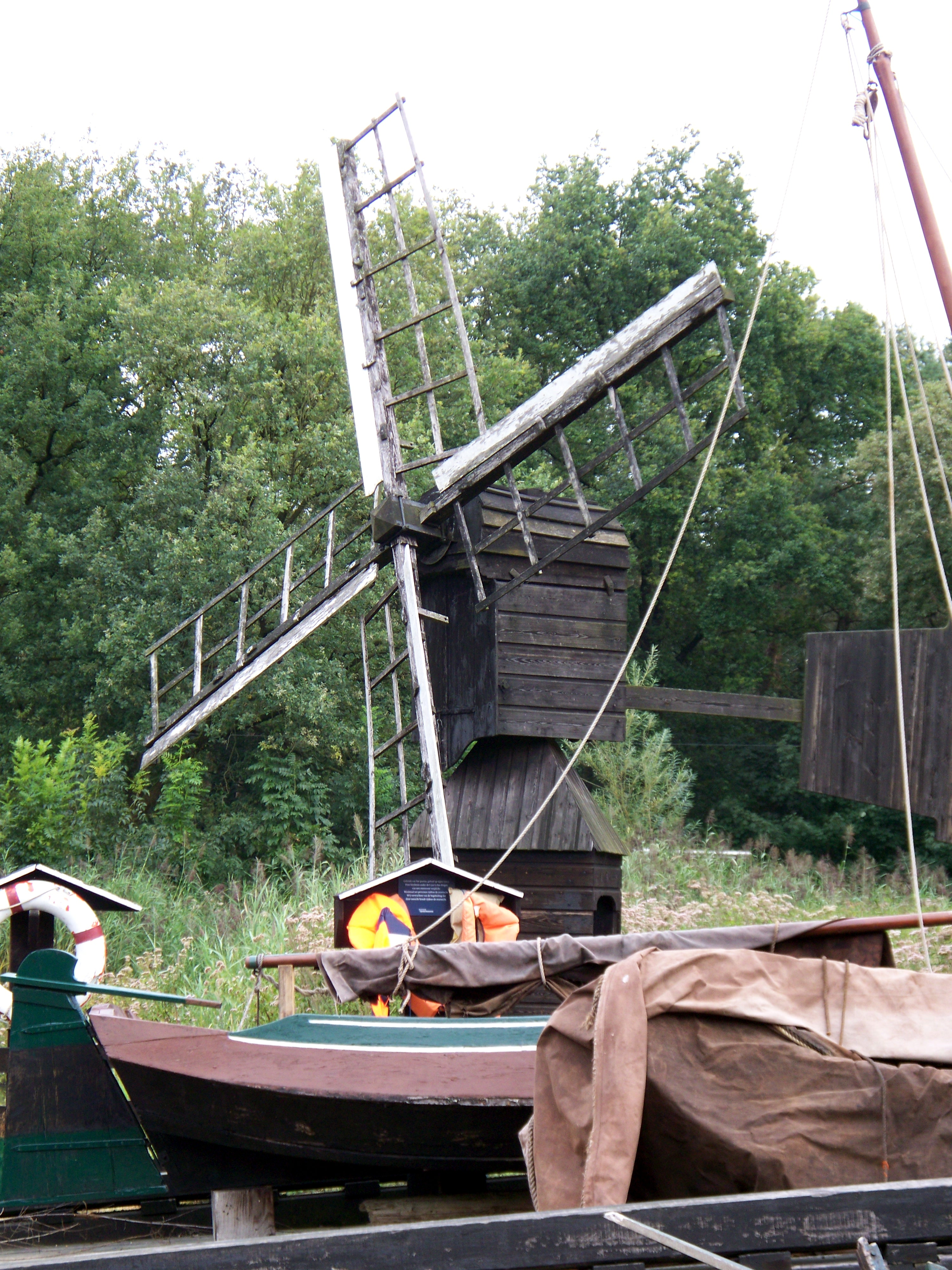
- The mill in September 2009.

Origin
- Mill location: Schelmseweg 89, 6816 SJ, Arnhem
- Coordinates: 52°00′42″N 5°54′33″E
- Operator(s): Netherlands Open Air Museum
- Year built: 1946

Information
- Purpose: Drainage mill
- Type: Hollow post mill
- No. of sails: Four sails
- Type of sails: Common sails
- Windshaft: Wood
- Winding: Tail vane
- Type of pump: Centrifugal pump

A hollow post mill at the Netherlands Open Air Museum, Arnhem, Gelderland, Netherlands was originally built at Gouda, South Holland, Netherlands. It was dismantled in 1946 and re-erected at the museum. The mill has been restored to working order.

== History ==
The mill was originally built to drain the Oude en Nieuwe Goudse Polder at Gouda, South Holland. It was dismantled in 1946 and re-erected at the Netherlands Open Air Museum, Arnhem, Gelderland. The mill was restored to working order in 2009.

== Description ==
The mill is what the Dutch describe as a Weidemolen (English: Meadow mill). It is a small hollow post mill on a roundhouse. The mill is winded by tail vane. The buck and roundhouse are covered in boards. The sails are Common sails. They have a span of 5.90 metres (19 ft 4 in). The sails are carried on a wooden windshaft. The windshaft carries the brake wheel which has 32 cogs. This drives the wallower (9 cogs) at the top of the upright shaft. At the bottom of the upright shaft a centrifugal pump is driven.

== Public access ==
The mill can be viewed externally during museum opening hours.

== See also ==
Windmills in Arnhem

- De Hoop
- De Kroon

Windmills in the Netherlands Open Air Museum

- Boktjasjker
- Het Fortuyn
- Huizermolen
- Mijn Genoegen
- Spinnenkop
- Arnhem post mill (1989)
- Arnhem smock mill (1960)
