= De Hoop, Arnhem =

Dutch windmill

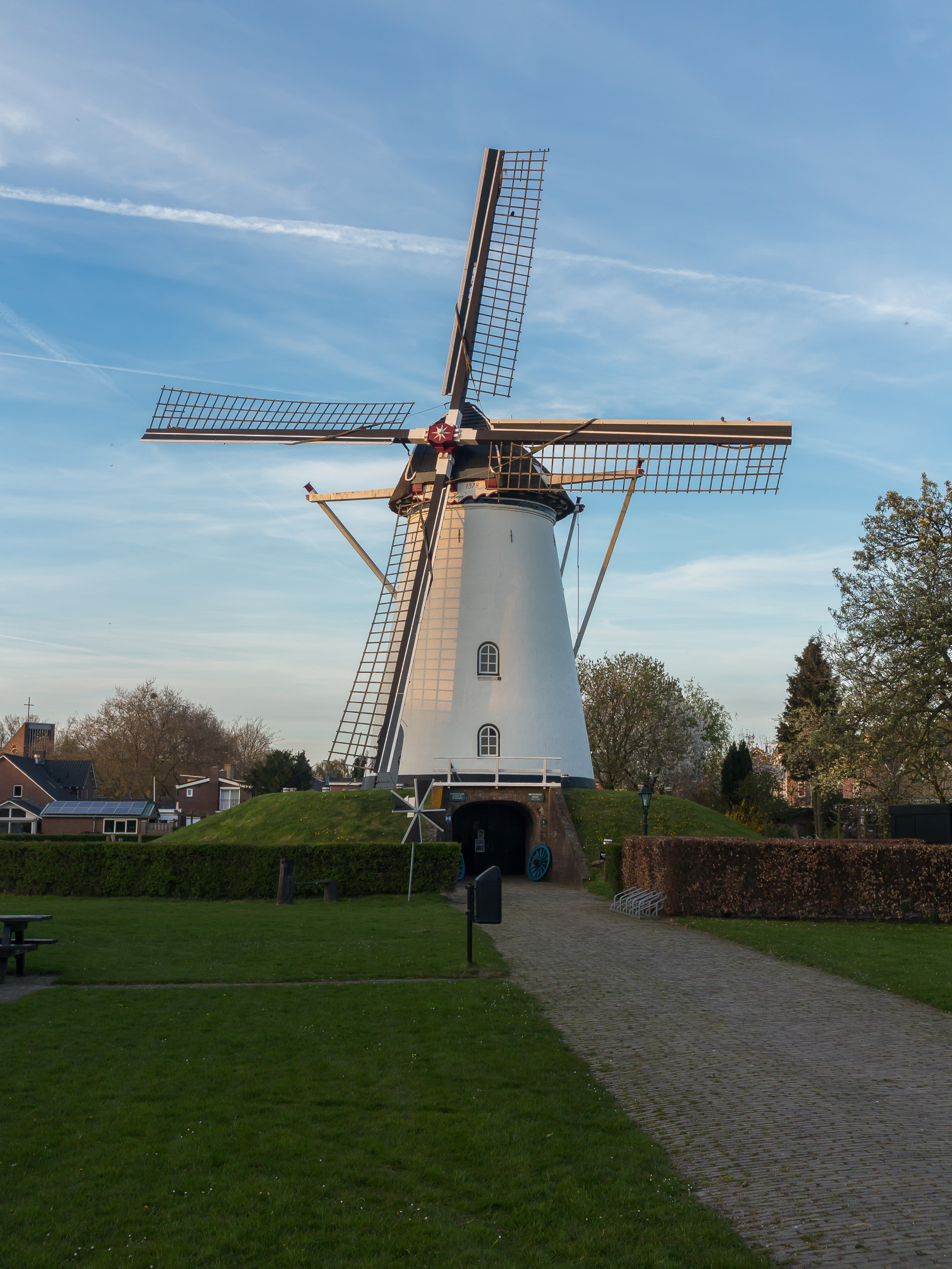
- De Hoop, April 2015

Origin
- Mill name: De Hoop
- Mill location: Molenweg 1, 6842 BG, Arnhem
- Coordinates: 51°57′25″N 5°52′55″E
- Operator(s): Gemeente Arnhem
- Year built: 1846

Information
- Purpose: Corn mill
- Type: Tower mill
- Storeys: Three storey tower, plus basement
- No. of sails: Four sails
- Type of sails: Common sails
- Windshaft: Cast iron
- Winding: Tailpole and winch
- Auxiliary power: Steam engine petrol engine
- No. of pairs of millstones: Two pairs
- Size of millstones: 1.50 metres (4 ft 11 in) diameter

De Hoop (English: The Hope) is a tower mill in Arnhem, Gelderland, Netherlands which was built in 1846 and is in working order. The mill is listed as a Rijksmonument.

== History ==
De Hoop^{[Note 1]} was built in 1846. In 1900, a steam engine was installed. This was replaced by a petrol engine in 1910. The mill ceased working by wind in 1931, after which its condition deteriorated. The mill was restored in 1951 by Beyk of Afferden, Gelderland, but not to working order. The mill was bought by the Gemeente Arnhem in 1975. In 1977, the mill was restored to working order, and officially opened on National Mills Day, 1978. In January 1999, the mill was registered as a place where weddings may take place. The Molen van Sloten, Sloten, North Holland is the only other windmill in the Netherlands to be so registered. De Hoop is listed as a Rijksmonument, № 8387.

== Description ==
De Hoop is what the Dutch describe as a "Beltmolen". It is a tower mill built into a mound. The cap is thatched. The mill is winded by tailpole and winch. The sails are Common sails. They have a span of 23.00 metres (75 ft 6 in). The sails are carried on a cast-iron windshaft, which was cast by Metaalpletterij L.I. Enthoven & Compagnie, The Hague, South Holland. The windshaft also carries the brake wheel which has 62 teeth. This drives a wallower which has 29 teeth located at the top of the upright shaft At the bottom of the upright shaft is the great spur wheel, which has 73 teeth. This drives two pairs of 1.50 metres (4 ft 11 in) French Burr millstones via lantern pinion stone nuts which have 14 staves each.

== Public access ==
De Hoop is open on Thursdays from 12:00 to 14:00 and Saturdays from 10:00 to 15:00, or by appointment.

== See also ==
Windmills in Arnhem

- De Kroon

Windmills in the Netherlands Open Air Museum

- Boktjasjker
- Het Fortuyn
- Huizermolen
- Mijn Genoegen
- Spinnenkop
- Arnhem post mill (1946)
- Arnhem post mill (1989)
- Arnhem smock mill (1960)

== Notes ==
1. Not to be confused with the mill built in 1849 and also known as De Hoop.
