= De Kroon, Arnhem =

Dutch windmill

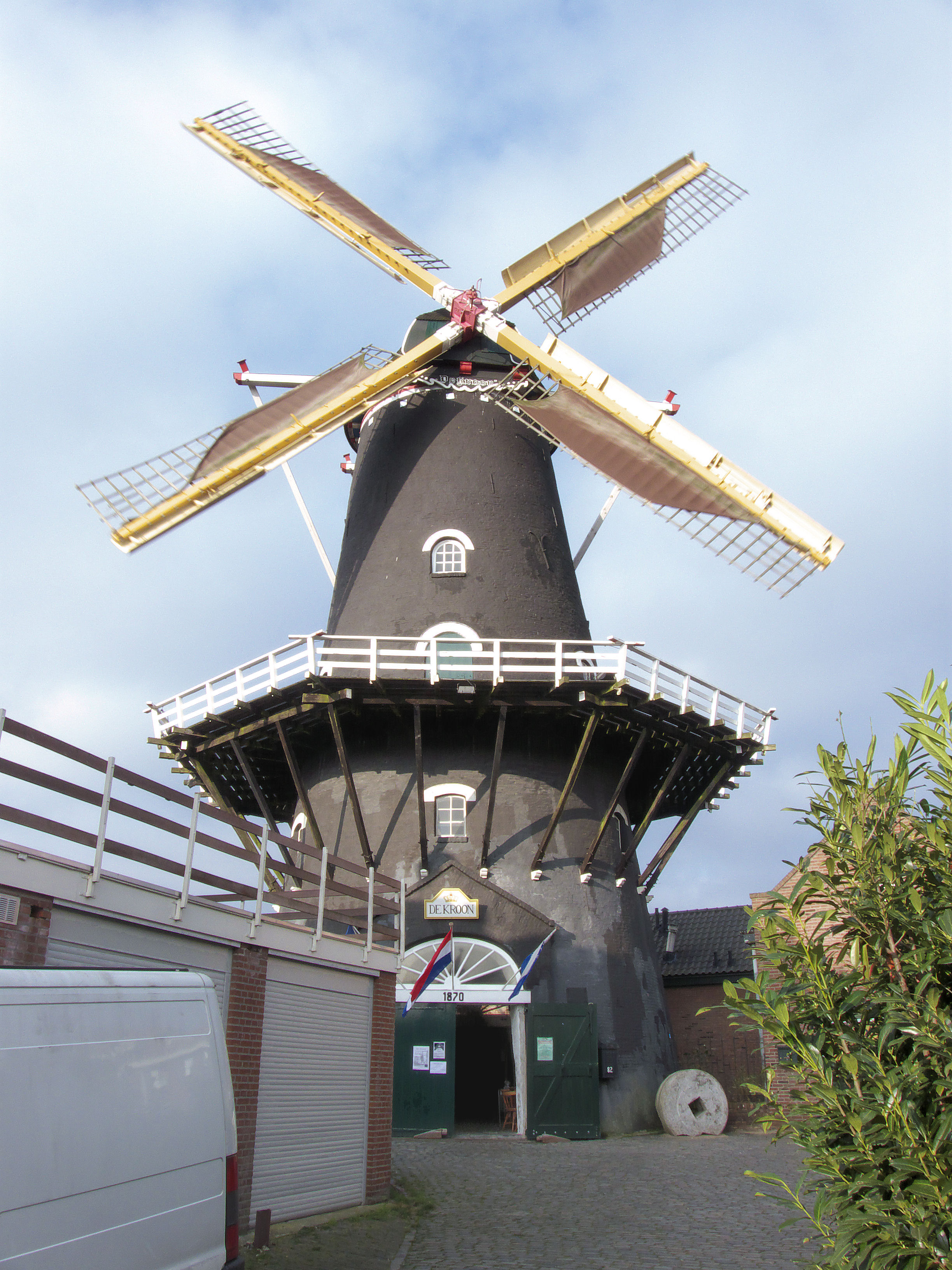
- De Kroon, December 2008

Origin
- Mill name: De Kroon
- Mill location: Klarendalseweg 82, 6816 SJ, Arnhem
- Coordinates: 52°00′34″N 5°54′41″E
- Operator(s): Stichting Volkshuisvesting Arnhem
- Year built: 1870

Information
- Purpose: Corn mill
- Type: Tower mill
- Storeys: Five storey tower
- No. of sails: Four sails
- Type of sails: Common sails, Fok system on leading edges
- Windshaft: Cast iron
- Winding: Tailpole and winch
- No. of pairs of millstones: Three pairs
- Size of millstones: Two pairs 1.60 metres (5 ft 3 in) diameter, One pair 1.50 metres (4 ft 11 in) diameter

De Kroon (English: The Crown) or the Klarendalse Molen is a tower mill in Arnhem, Gelderland, Netherlands which was built in 1870 and is in working order. The mill is listed as a Rijksmonument.

== History ==
De Kroon was originally built in 1849 for Albertus Burgers. It stood at the junction of Amsterdamseweg and Rozenstraat, where it was known as De Hoop (English: The Hope)^{[Note 1]}. The mill was demolished in 1870 and rebuilt in the Klarendseweg. Burgers owned the mill until 1886. The Menno van Coehoornkazerne (an army barracks) was built nearby in 1885 and provided good trade for the mill. The barracks started grinding its own meal in 1900 and the mill's business declined. The mill was now owned by the Reymes brothers. The stage collapsed on 13 July 1933, but it was soon replaced. The mill was restored in 1936, but still ran at a loss.

In 1945 the sails were fitted with the Fok system on their leading edges. The mill did little work due to competition from power-driven mills. The mill was sold by Abraham Reijmes in 1946. It was bought by J Oosterdorp. He milled mainly by engine power and the mill again deteriorated. The Gemeente Arnhem prohibited the use of the sails in 1962; they were removed in 1964. The mill was bought for ƒ1 by the Stichting Vrienden van Gelderse Molen in 1974. Restoration was completed in 1976. The mill was restored again in 1997, but a fire occurred on 4 February 1998. It was caused by an electrical short-circuit in a refrigerator. Repairs were completed by mid-1999. In 2011, the mill was sold to the Stichting Volkshuisvesting Arnhem. De Kroon is listed as a Rijksmonument, No. 8345.

== Description ==
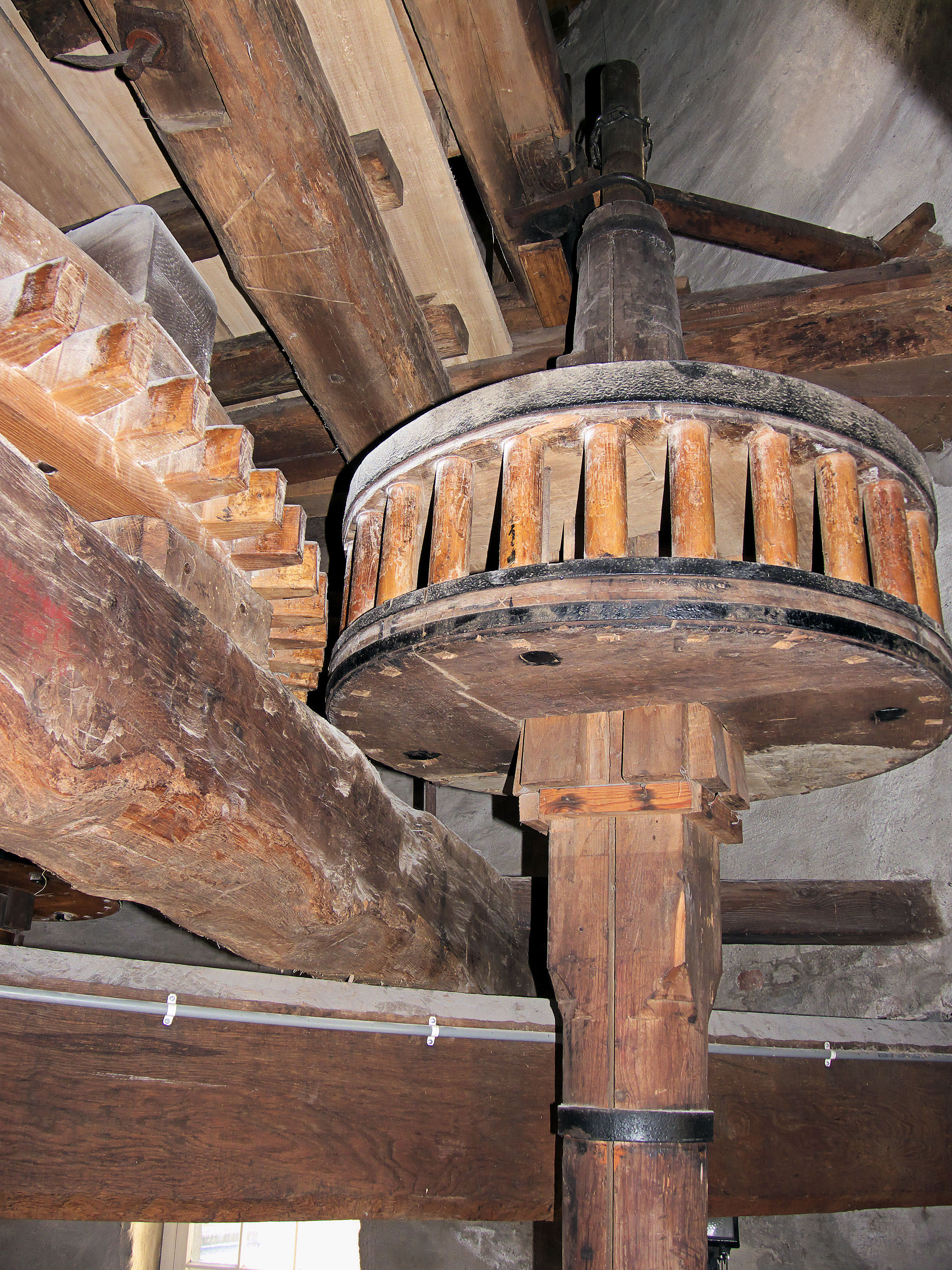
Great Spur Wheel and Lantern Pinion Stone Nut.

De Kroon is what the Dutch describe as a "Ronde stellingmolen". It is a five-storey tower mill with a stage. The stage is 8.20 metres (26 ft 11 in) above ground level. The cap is covered in shingles. The mill is winded by tailpole and winch. The sails are Common sails, fitted with the Fok system on their leading edges. They have a span of 22.90 metres (75 ft 2 in). The sails are carried on a cast-iron windshaft, which was cast by the Gieterij Hardinxveld in 1997. The windshaft also carries the brake wheel which has 63 teeth. This drives a wallower, which has 32 teeth, and is located at the top of the upright shaft At the bottom of the upright shaft is the great spur wheel, which has 80 teeth. This drives three pairs of millstones via lantern pinion stone nuts, which have 2632 staves each, apart from that driving the pearl barley stones, which has 24 staves. The millstones are a pair 1.60 metres (5 ft 3 in) diameter Cullen stones, a pair of 1.60 metres (5 ft 3 in) diameter Bentheimer stones, and one pair of 1.50 metres (4 ft 11 in) French Burr stones.

== Millers ==
- Albertus Burgers (1849–86)
- F. L. Frenck (1886–95)
- H. Burgers (1895-1906
- Reymes Brothers (1906- )
- Abraham Reijmes ( -1956)
- J. Oostendorp (1956–74)

References for above:-

== Public access ==
De Kroon is open Fridays 13:00-16:00 and Saturdays 11:00-15:00, or by appointment.

== See also ==
Windmills in Arnhem

- De Hoop

Windmills in the Netherlands Open Air Museum

- Boktjasjker
- Het Fortuyn
- Huizermolen
- Mijn Genoegen
- Spinnenkop
- Arnhem post mill (1946)
- Arnhem post mill (1989)
- Arnhem smock mill (1960)

== Notes ==
1. Not to be confused with the mill built in 1846 and also known as De Hoop.
