= Hellouw =

- Village
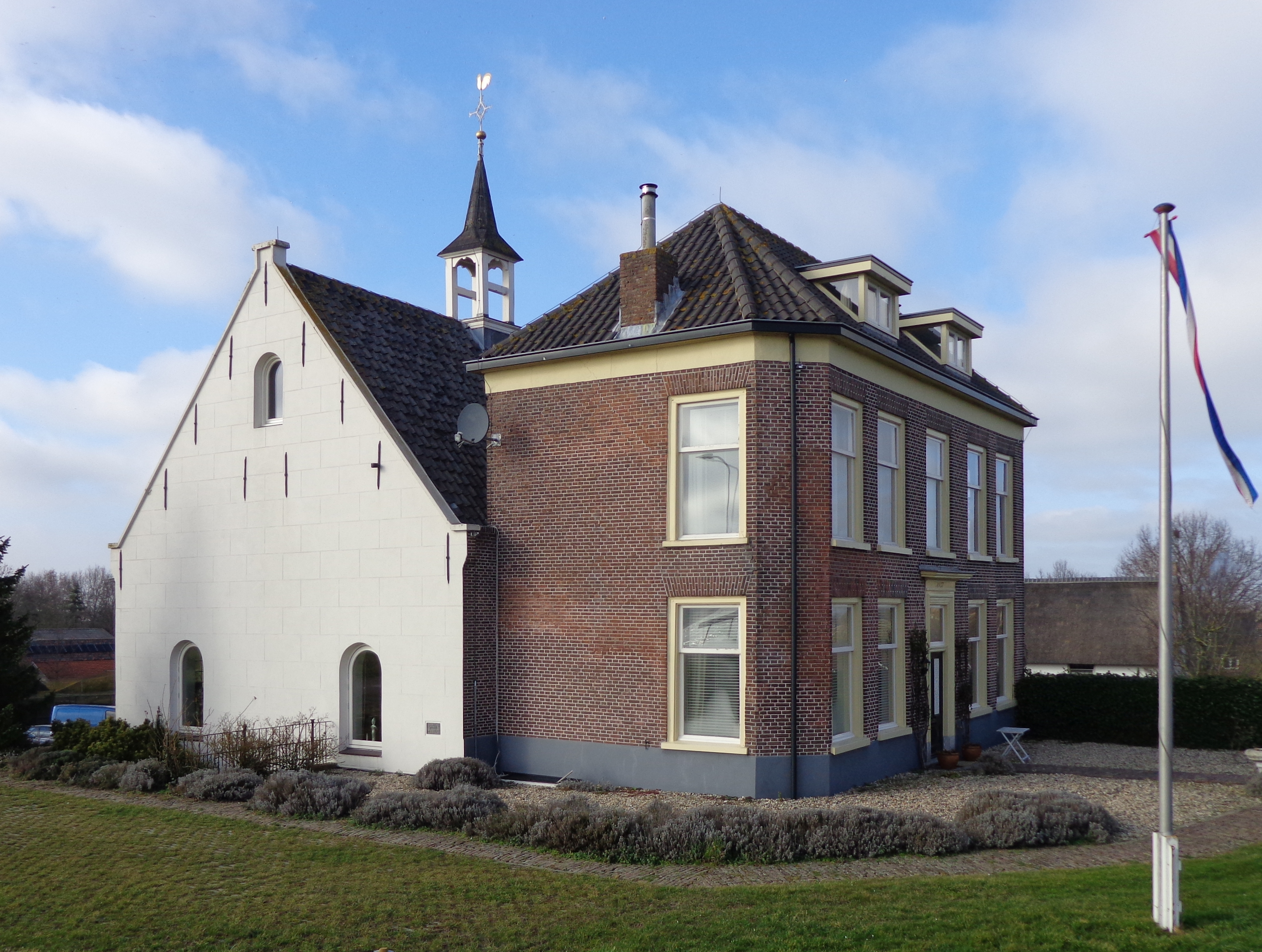
- Church with attached house

- Location in the Netherlands Hellouw (Netherlands)
- Coordinates: 51°49′39″N 5°10′37″E
- Country: Netherlands
- Province: Gelderland
- Municipality: West Betuwe

Area
  - Total: 8.80 km^{2} (3.40 sq mi)
- Elevation: 1 m (3.3 ft)

Population (2021)
  - Total: 1,025
  - Density: 116/km^{2} (302/sq mi)
- Time zone: UTC+1 (CET)
  - Summer (DST): UTC+2 (CEST)
- Postal code: 4174
- Dialing code: 0418

Hellouw is a village in the Dutch province of Gelderland. It is a part of the municipality of West Betuwe and lies about 14 km east of Gorinchem.

It was first mentioned in 850 as in Hellouua. The etymology is unclear. In 850, Hellouw was a heerlijkheid. In 1709, the village was flooded and destroyed as well as the manor house. In 1823, the Dutch Reformed Church was built with attached clergy house. In 1840, Hellouw was home to 560 people.

== Gallery ==
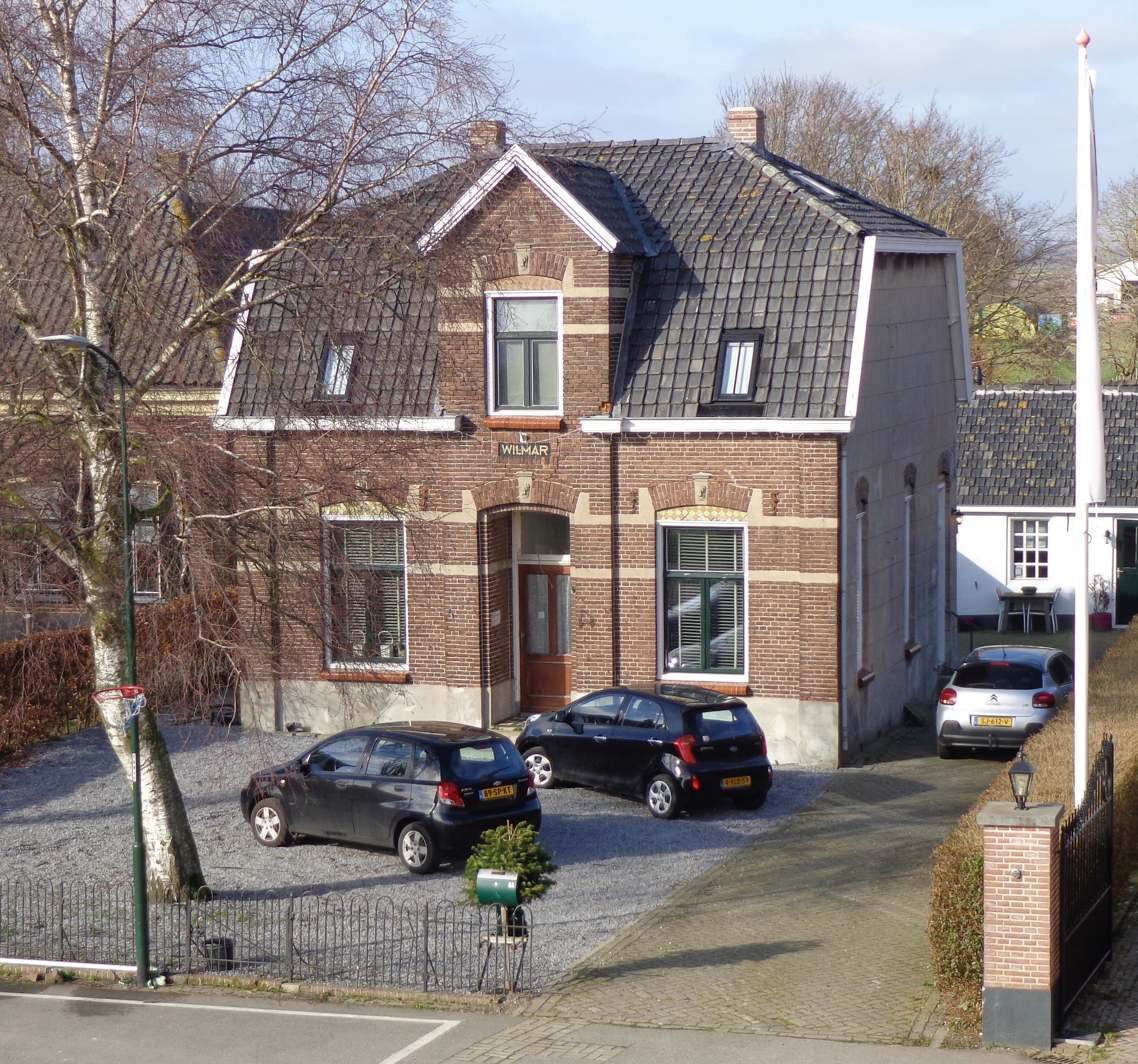
House in Hellouw

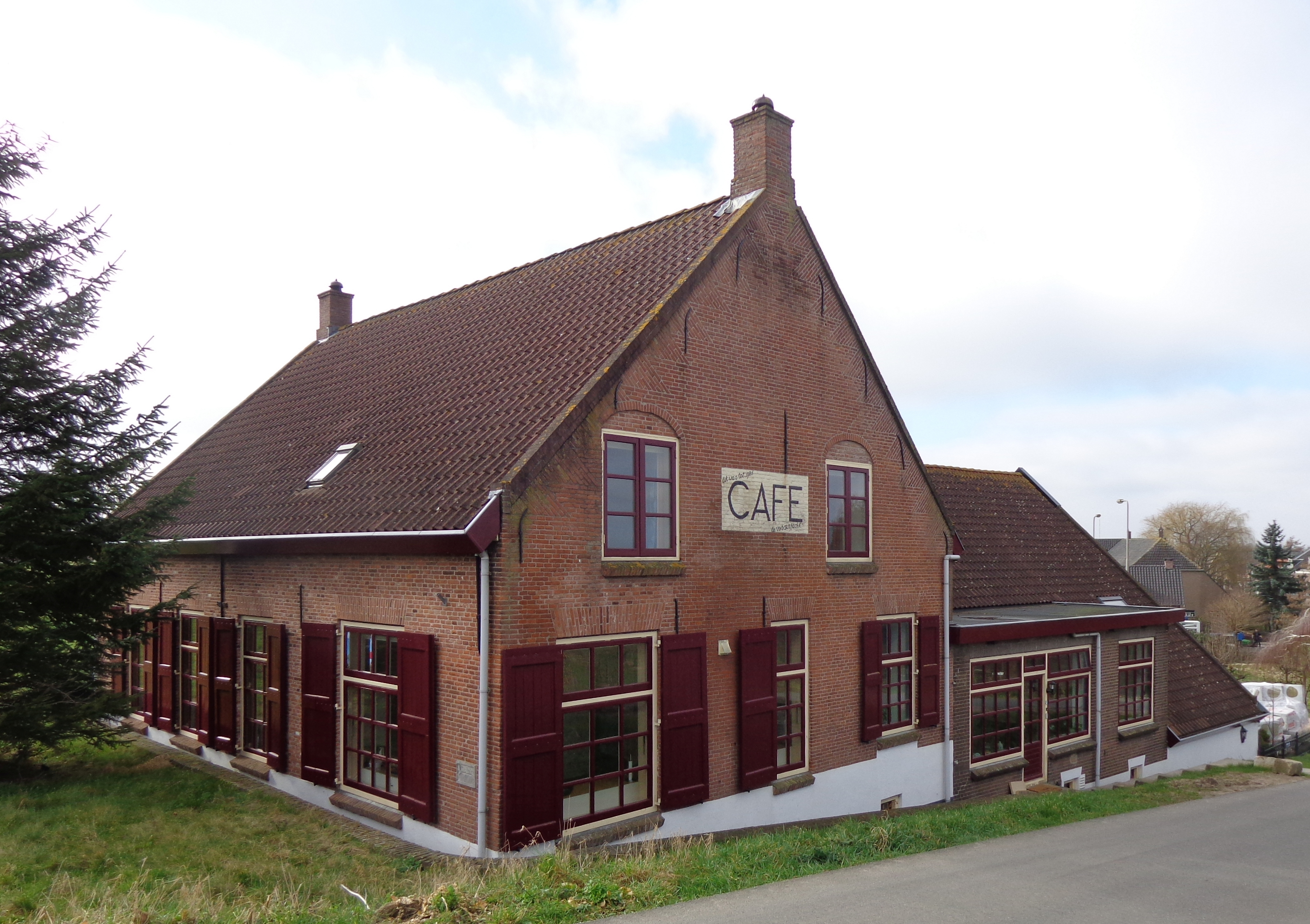
Pub in Hellouw
