= Teunismolen, De Heurne =

Dutch windmill

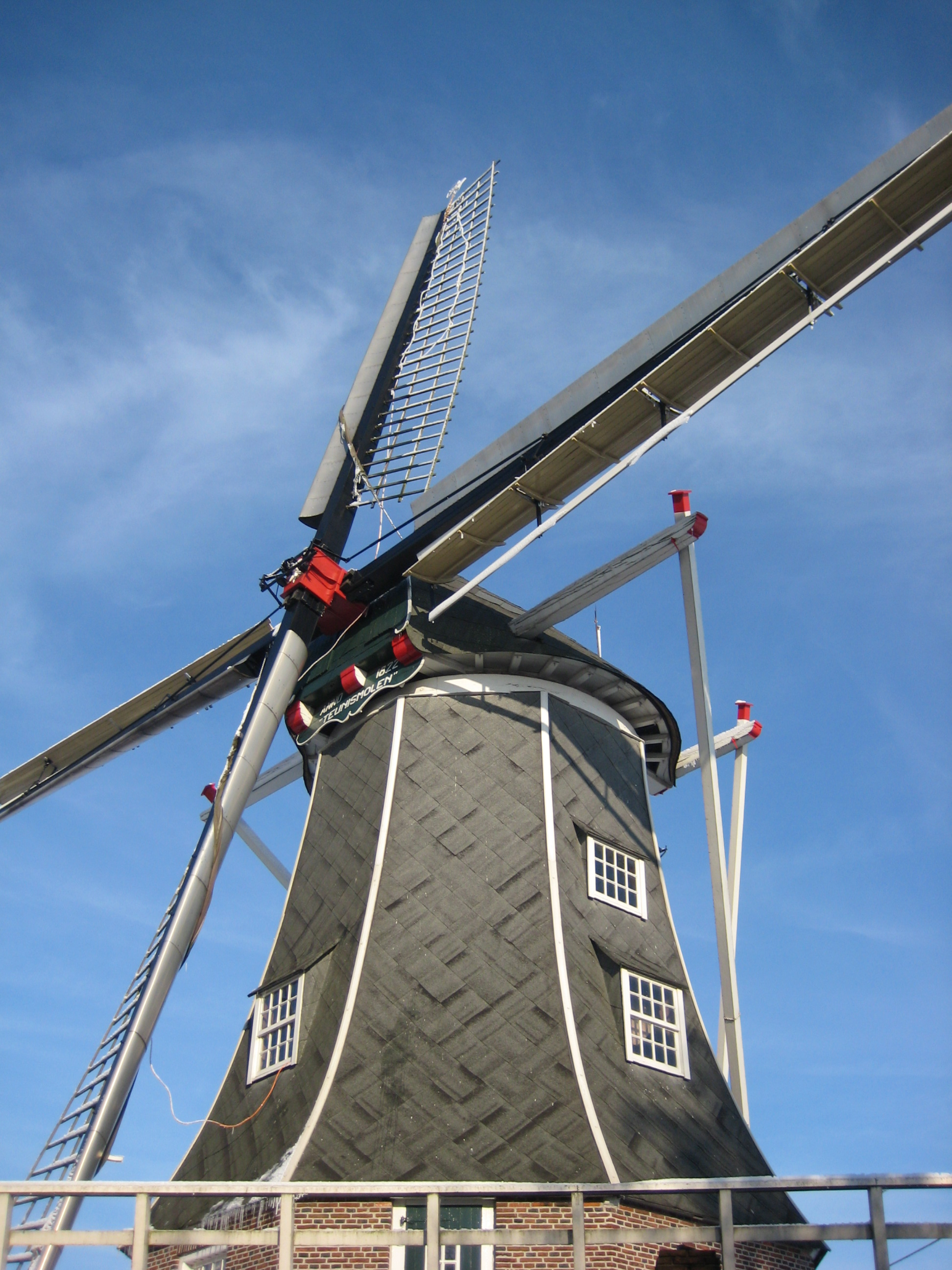
- The mill in January 2009

Origin
- Mill name: Teunismolen; De Haan
- Mill location: Teunismolenweg 4, 7095 BM, De Heurne
- Coordinates: 51°54′07″N 6°30′13″E
- Operator(s): Gemeente Aalten
- Year built: 1822

Information
- Purpose: Corn mill
- Type: Smock mill
- Storeys: Two storey smock
- Base storeys: Two storey base
- Smock sides: Eight
- No. of sails: Four sails
- Type of sails: One pair Common sails with Van Bussel system on leading edges, One pair Ten Have sails with Van Bussel system
- Windshaft: cast iron
- Winding: Tailpole and winch
- No. of pairs of millstones: One pair
- Size of millstones: 1.50 metres (4 ft 11 in) diameter

Teunismolen or De Haan (English: The Rooster) is a smock mill in De Heurne, Gelderland, Netherlands which was built in 1822 and has been restored to working order. The mill is listed as a Rijksmonument.

== History ==
The mill was built in 1822 by millwrights Vriesen en Buynink of Lichtenvoorde, Gelderland for Wander Ormel. Originally known as De Haan, the mill gets its current name of Teunismolen from a farm that stood nearby. The mill remained in the ownership of the Ormel family until 1906, although it was worked from 1858 by Hendrikus Iding, and later by his son Stephanus. The mill was bought by J W Heinen in 1906, passing to his sons in 1937. In 1942, a pair of Ten Have sails was fitted; before this, the mill had spent some time working on only two sails. The mill ceased working in 1981 with the death of G J Heinen. It was sold by his brother H J Heinin in 1986 to the Gemeente Dinxperlo, which became the municipality Aalten in 2004. The mill was restored to working order in 1987–88. It is listed as a Rijksmonument, No. 12924.

== Description ==
Teunismolen is what the Dutch call a "Stellingmolen". It is a two-storey smock mill on a two-storey brick base. There is a stage, which is 2.90 metres (9 ft 6 in) above ground level. The cap and smock are covered in asphalt tiles. Winding is by tailpole and winch. The sails are a pair os Common sails fitted with the Van Bussel system on their leading edges, and a pair of Ten Have sails, fitted with the Van Bussel system on their leading edges. They have a span of 23.50 metres (77 ft 1 in). They are carried on a cast iron windshaft, which was cast by the Gietijzerij De Prins van Oranje, The Hague, South Holland in 1877. The windshaft also carries the brake wheel, which has 53 cogs. This drives a wallower with 26 cogs, which is situated at the top of the upright shaft. At the bottom of the upright shaft is the great spur wheel, which has 75 cogs. This drives a pair of 1.50 metres (4 ft 11 in) diameter French Burr millstones via a lantern pinion stone nut with 24 staves.

== Public access ==
De Teunismolen is open by appointment.
