= Netherlands Open Air Museum =

Open air history museum in Arnhem, Netherlands

- Nederlands Openluchtmuseum
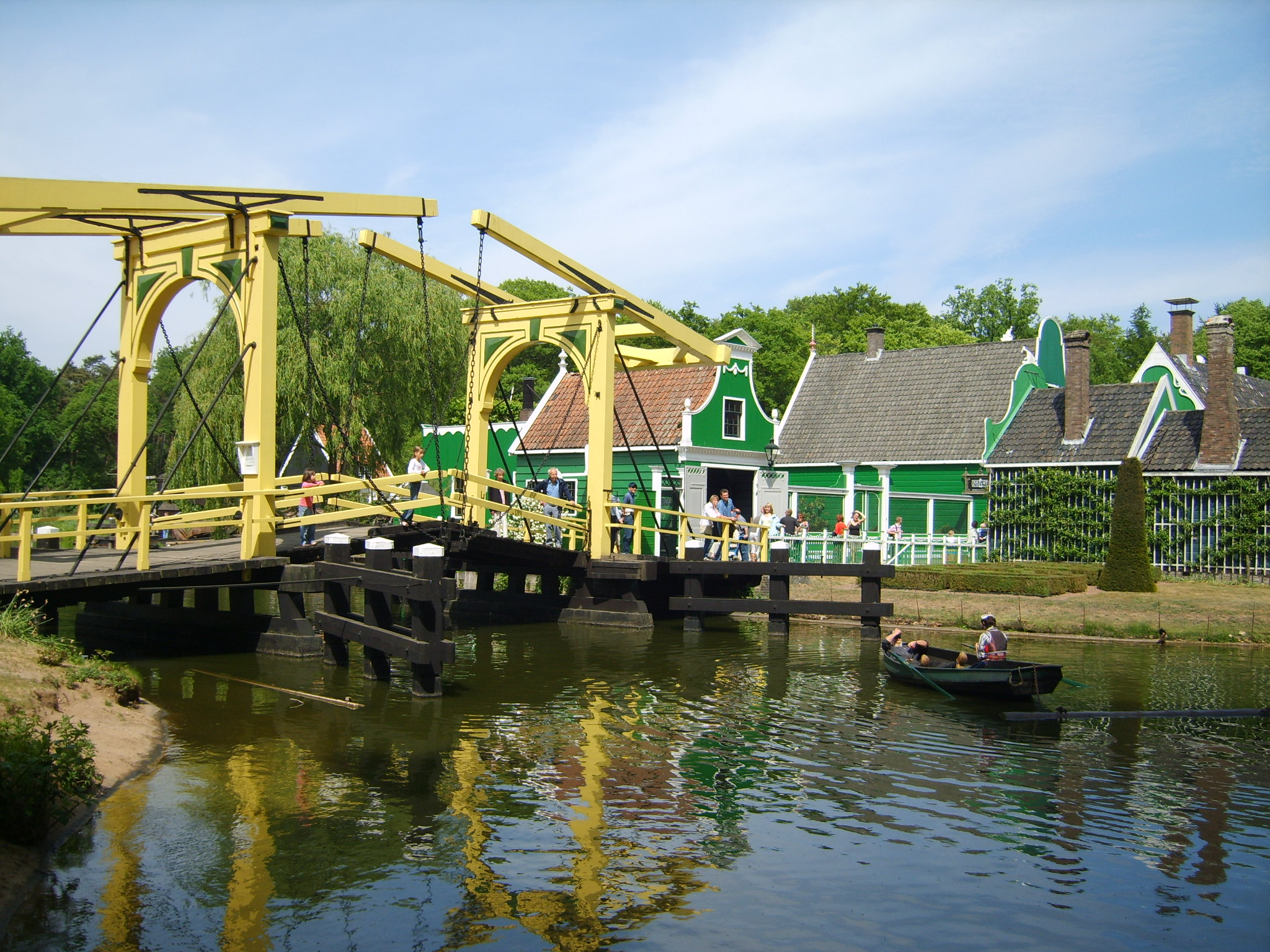
- Houses from the Zaan region

- Location in Gelderland in the Netherlands
- Established: 1912
- Location: Hoeferlaan 4 Arnhem, Netherlands
- Coordinates: 52°0′38″N 5°54′37″E
- Type: Open-air museum
- Visitors: 598.881 (2025): Ranking 10th nationally (2013)
- Director: Amito Haarhuis
- Website: openluchtmuseum.nl/en

The Netherlands Open Air Museum (Dutch: Nederlands Openluchtmuseum) is a national open-air museum located in Arnhem. It focuses on the culture associated with the everyday lives of ordinary people, and demonstrating the old way of life in the Netherlands.

The park was established on 24 April 1912, and opened to the public in July 1918.

== The Museum ==
The park is about 44 hectares in area, and includes around forty buildings such as antique houses, farms, and factories from various parts of the Netherlands and historical periods. The museum also has a collection of historic clothing and jewellery and demonstrates paper production, linseed production, and beer brewing.

In 1996, a heritage tram line opened in the museum. The line is 1750 m long, standard gauge, featuring electric trams from Amsterdam, Arnhem, Rotterdam, and The Hague, such as a replica of an Arnhem tram from 1929, the GETA 76.

In 1999–2000, a new indoor exhibition space was built.

The museum won the European Museum of the Year Award in 2005. Annually, it has more than 550,000 visitors.

== History ==
=== Establishment ===
The Open Air Museum was created after a suggestion from Frederic Adolph Hoefer in April 1912 to build a park similar to parks and museums he visited in Scandinavia. According to Hoefer, the rise of industrialization and urbanization were causing regional differences to disappear, and traditions and craftsmanship threatened to vanish. By moving the historical building to the museum, with people knowledgeable about the history, visitors could be shown how people used to live in the Netherlands. This way, the old traditions could be preserved.

The Association for Folklore The Dutch Open Air Museum (Dutch: Vereniging voor Volkskunde Het Nederlands Openluchtmuseum) was created that same month. It was opened to the public on July 13, 1918. At the time of its opening, the museum contained 6 buildings that had been moved in from other locations across the country.

=== World War II ===
During World War II, the museum was hit with incendiary bombs, which caused a building in the Zaanse buurt to go up in flames. In 1941, the museum was renamed the Rijksmuseum Voor Volkskunde (National museum for folklore). During the Battle of Arnhem, it temporarily served as a shelter for a few hundred evacuees.

Three children were born in the museum - Nora Olga Marijke (November 15, 1944), Franneke van der Kallen (November 17, 1944), and a child who died two weeks after birth.

In 1945 during an attack by a V-1 flying bomb the collection of garbs and painted furniture was lost.

== Research ==
Some research is done on-site at the Open Air Museum for the dating and conservation of materials acquired. The Multimedia Library of the museum contains pictures, slides, diagrams, videos, and audio recordings documenting Dutch folklife. They also work in tandem with the Foundation for Historical Farm Research (SHBO), the Working Party for Farmyards Foundation (SWB), and the Centre for Documentation and Information on Regional Dress (SDI) in their research on folk culture.

== Gallery ==
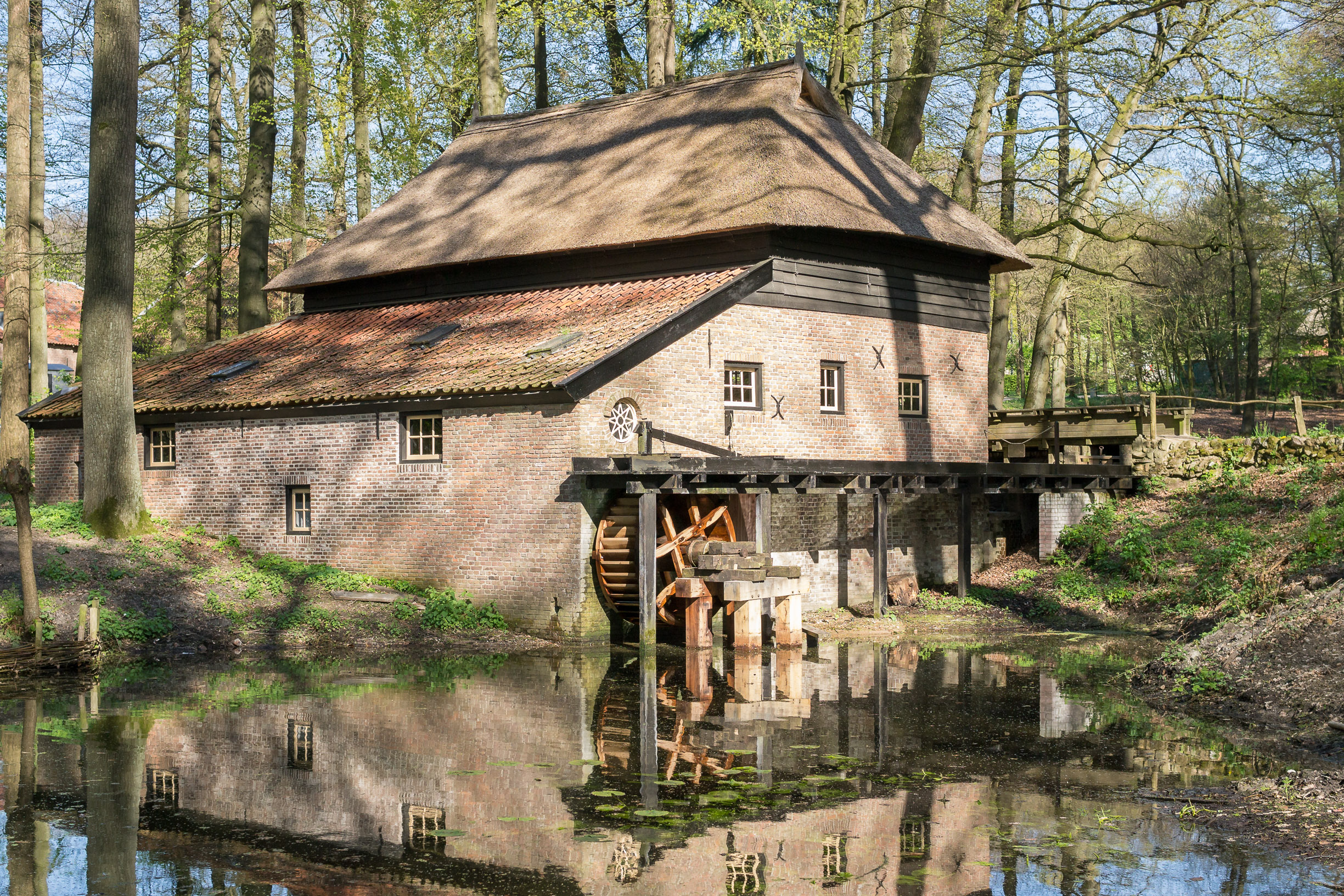
Paper mill

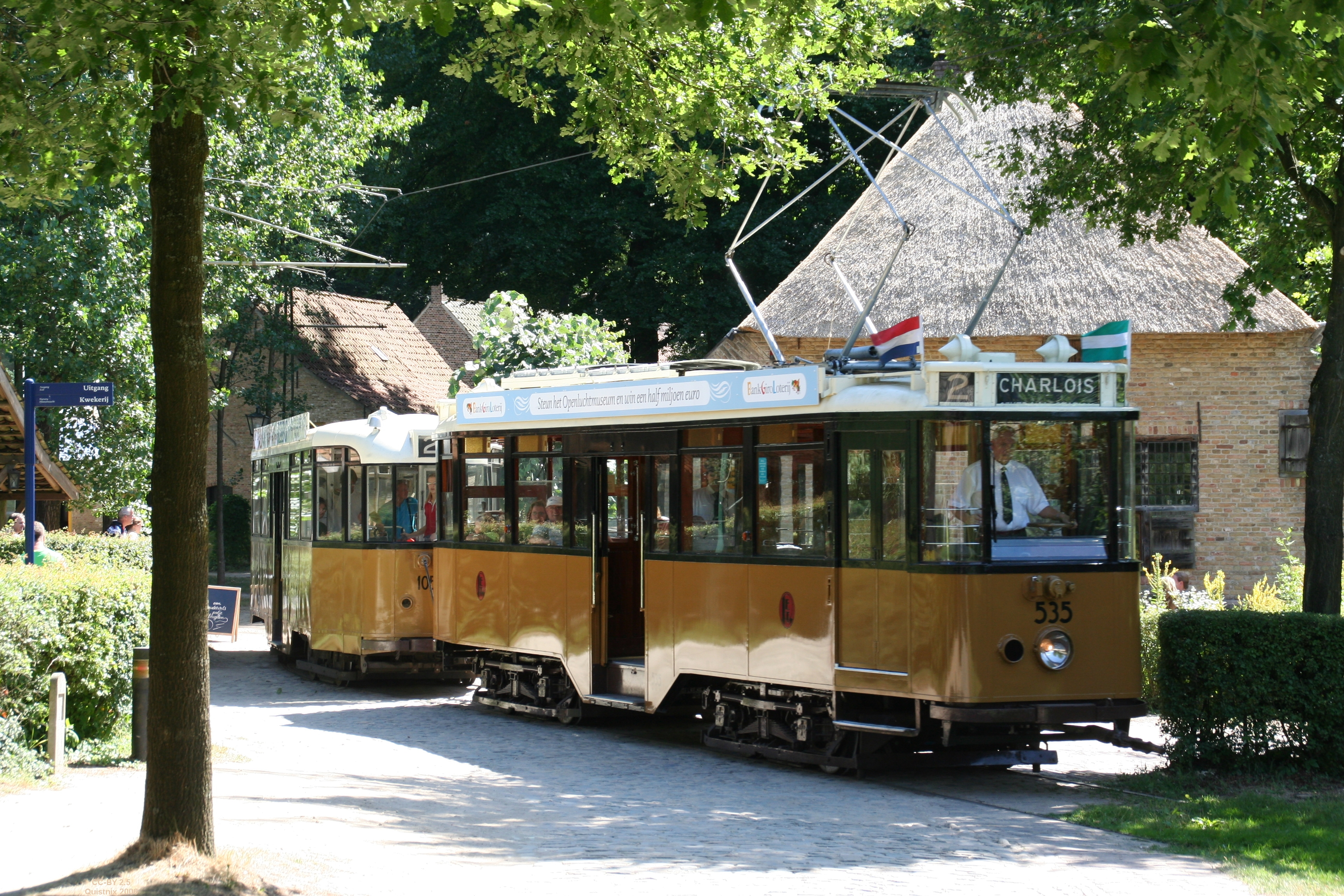
Tramway

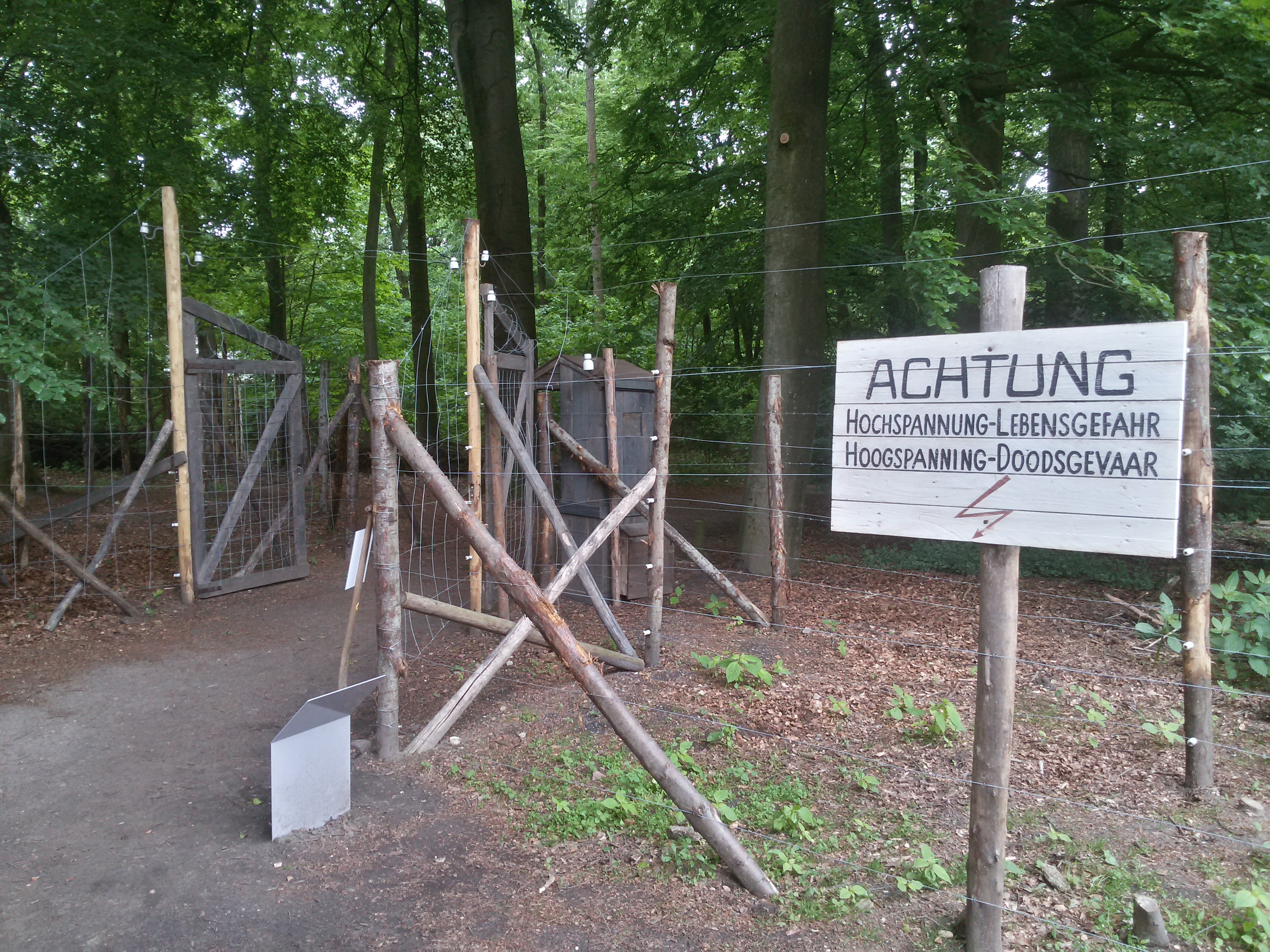
German border crossing from WWI, part of the Wire of Death

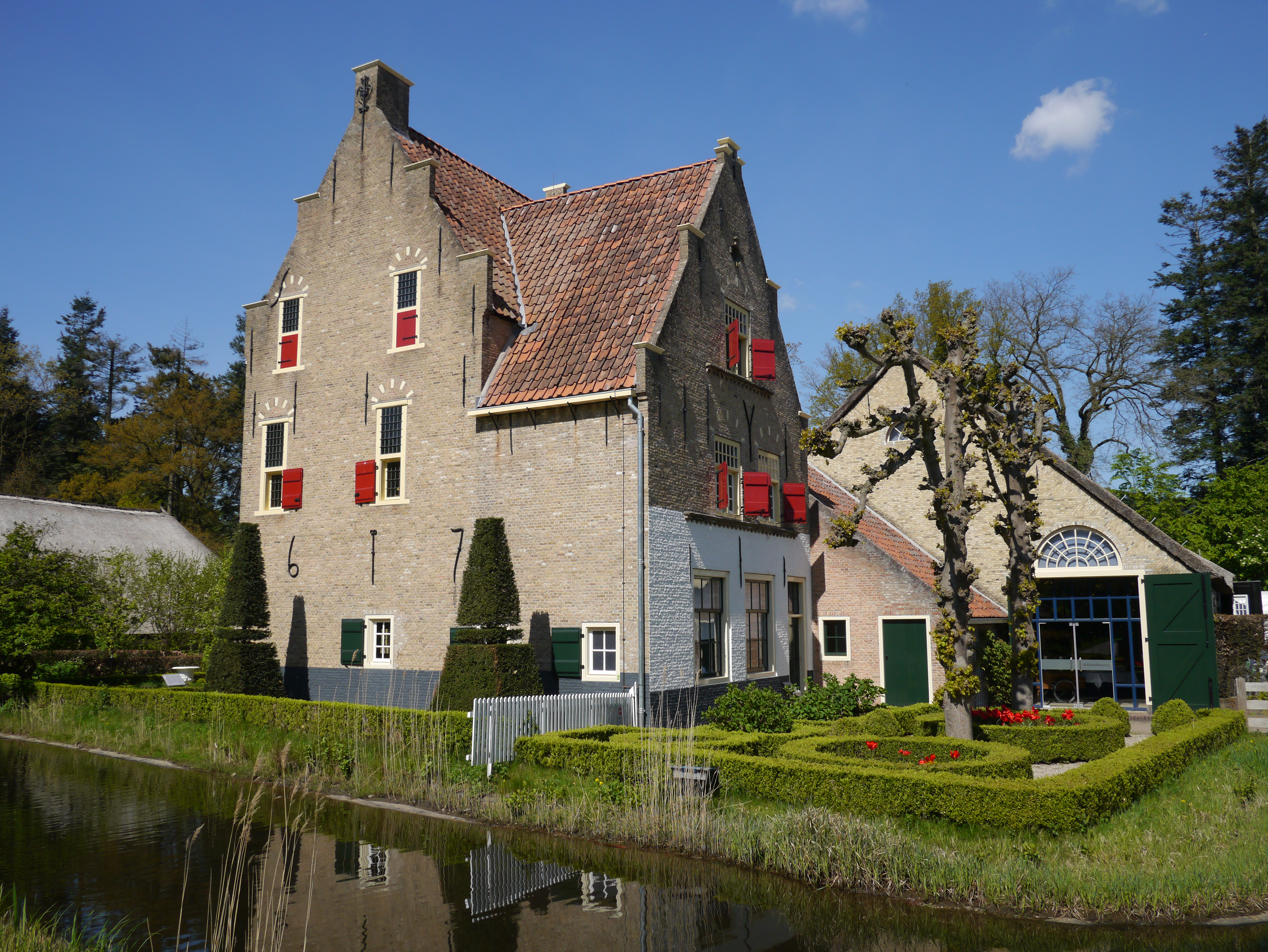
Farmhouse

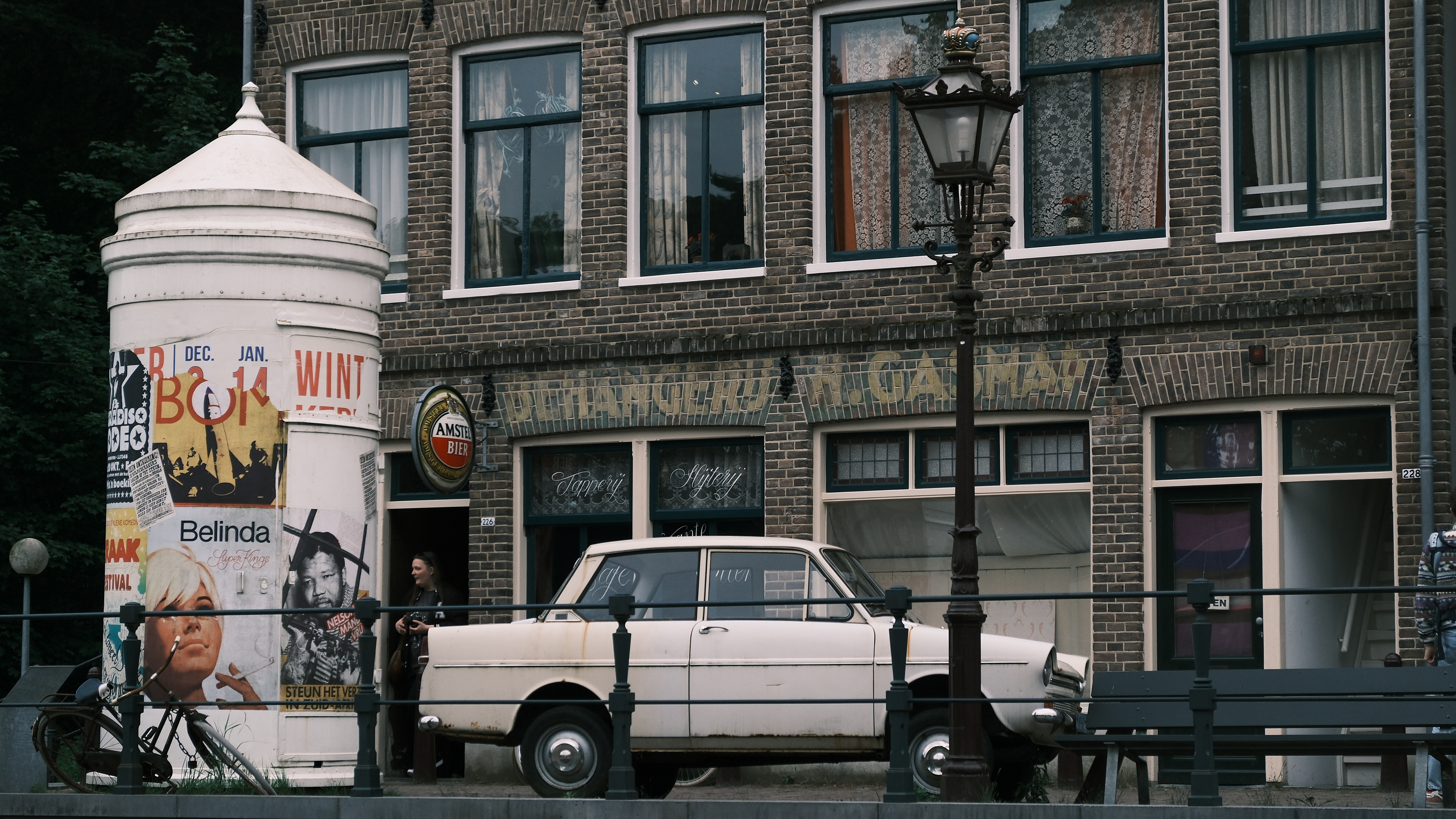
Old café (pub) from the Jordaan in Amsterdam

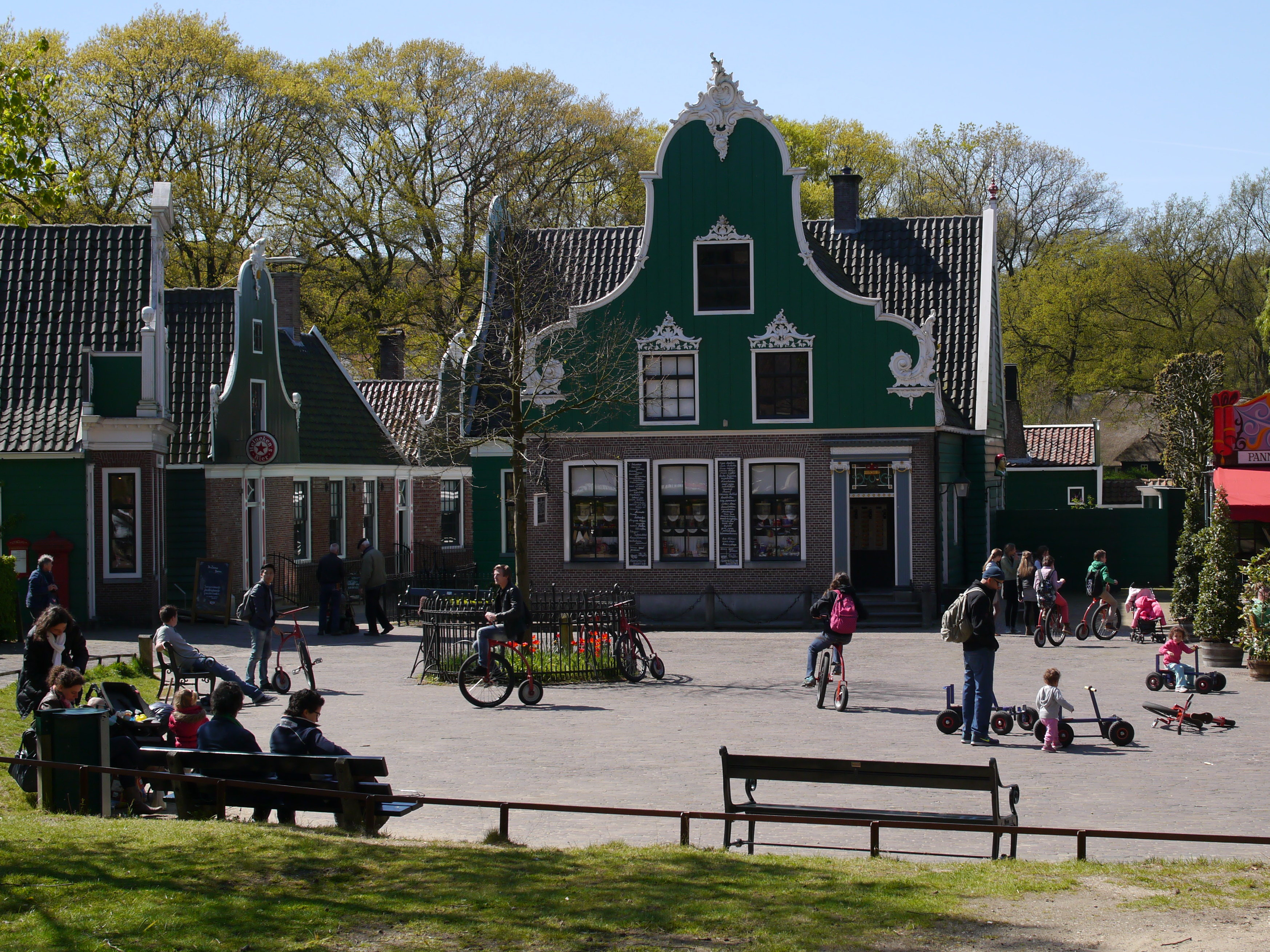
Houses from the Zaan region

== Sources ==
- Wagemakers, Ton. Nederlands Openluchtmuseum, Arnem. Trans. WTS, World Translation Services, Zeist. Nederlands Openluchtmuseum, 2000.
- History. Nederlands Openluchtmuseum. Retrieved on 2008-04-27.
- Mission. Nederlands Openluchtmuseum. Retrieved on 2008-04-27.
