= Tjaskers in the Netherlands =

Type of windmill

A Tjasker (Dutch: tjasker) is a type of small drainage windmill used in the Netherlands and Germany. There are 28 tjaskers remaining the Netherlands.

== Locations ==
=== Drenthe, Friesland, Overijssel ===
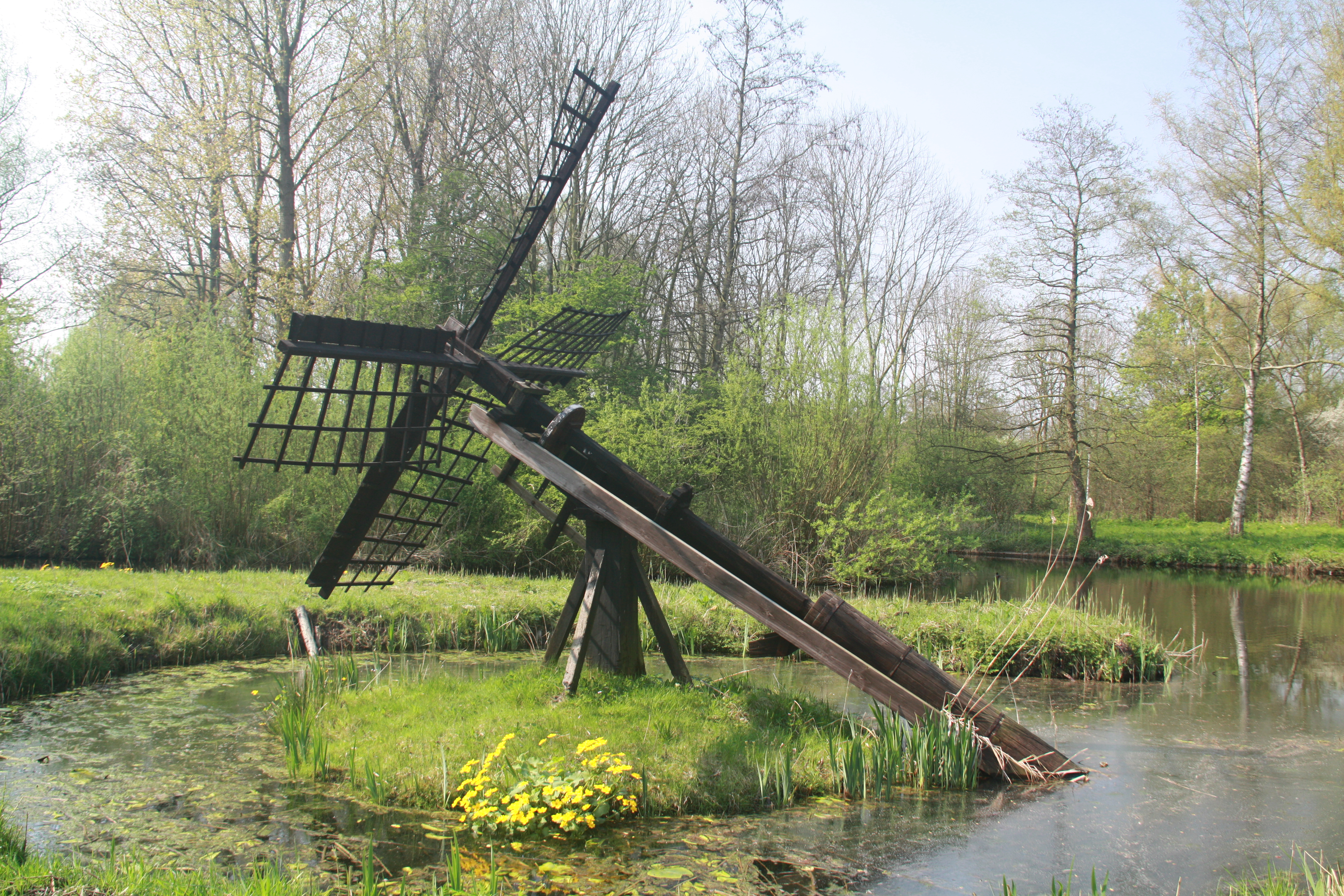
Tjasker Gaasperpark Amsterdam, April 2009

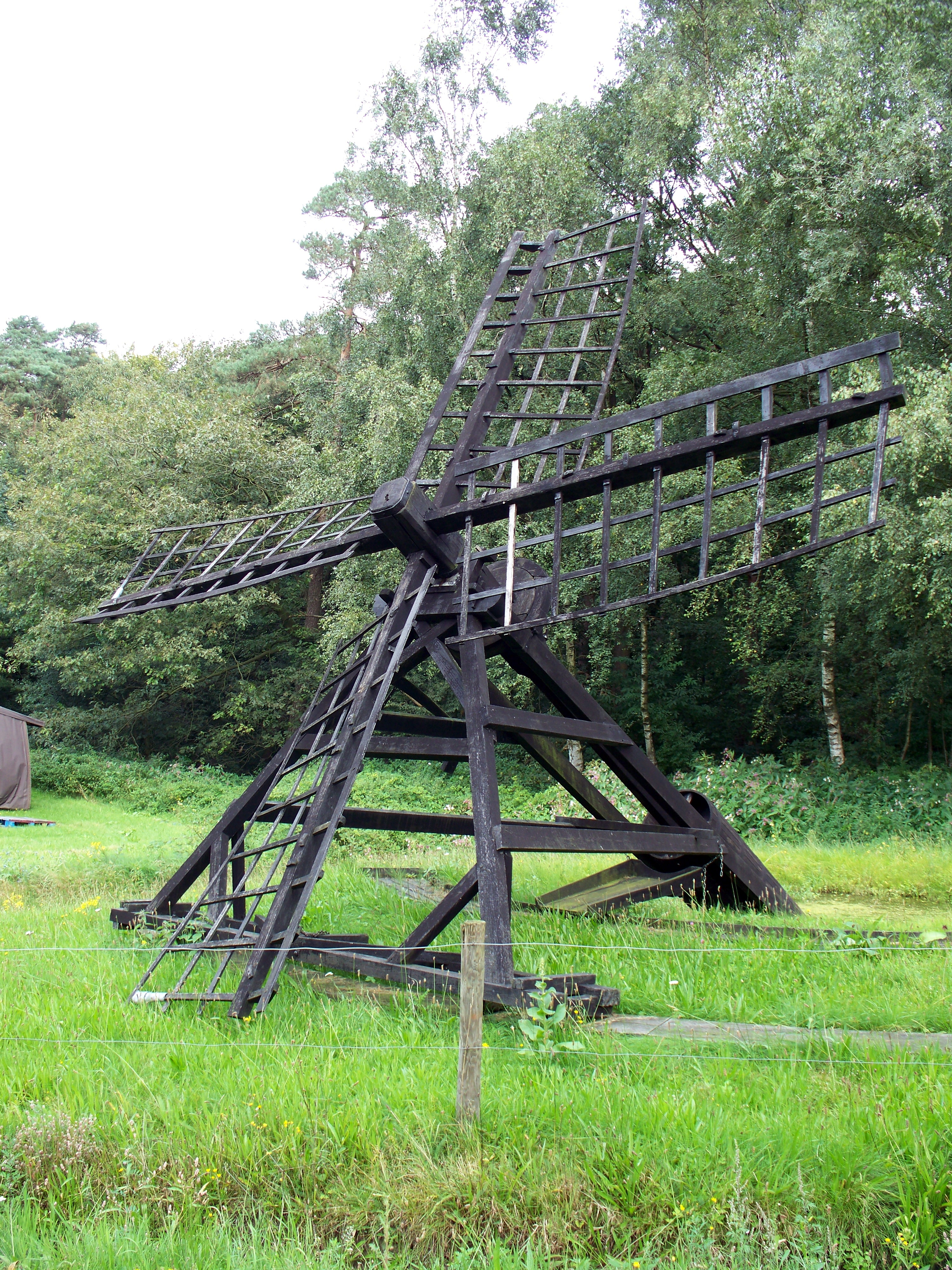
Tjasker Openluchtmuseum, Arnhem, September 2008

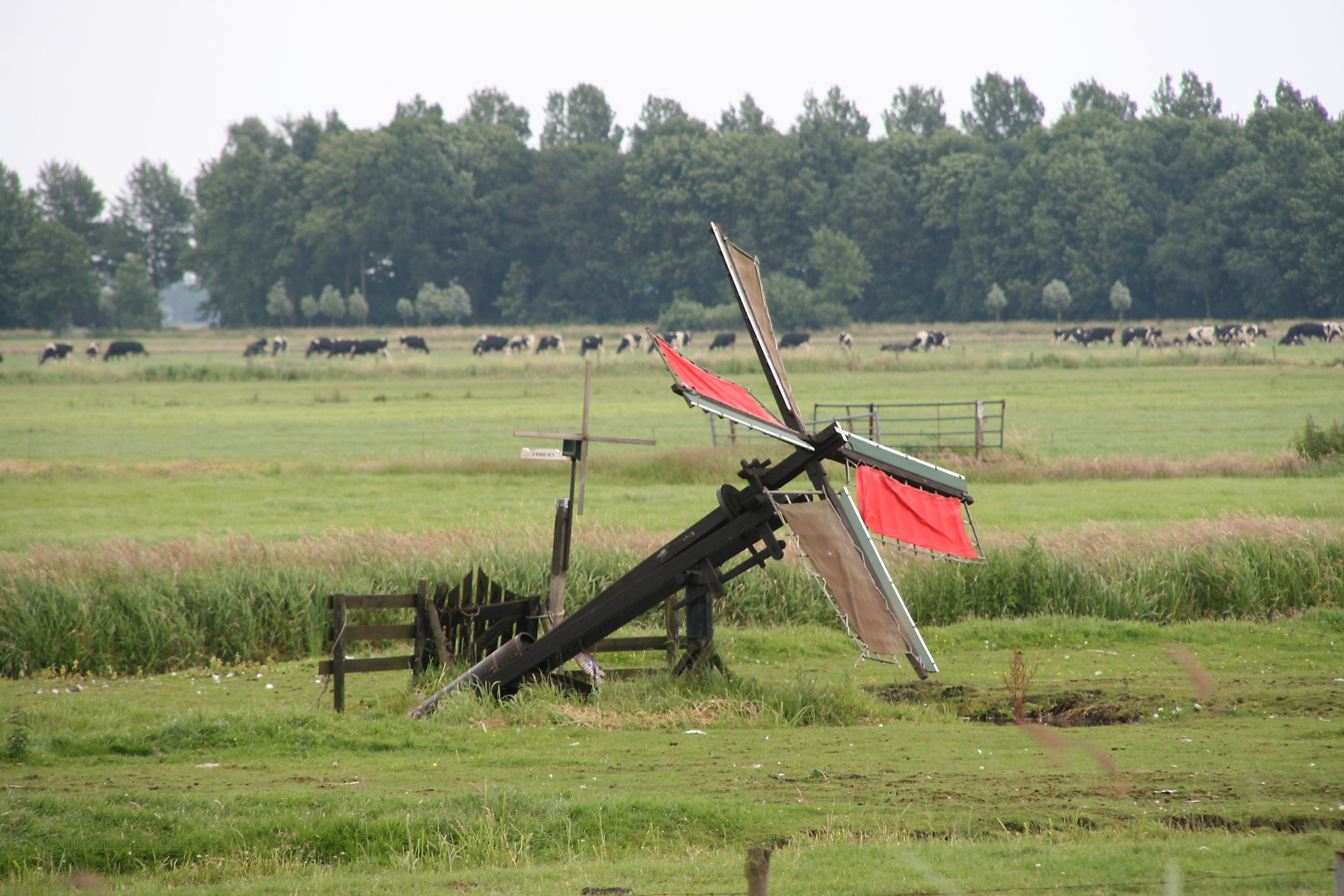
Tjasker Bleskensgraaf, June 2008

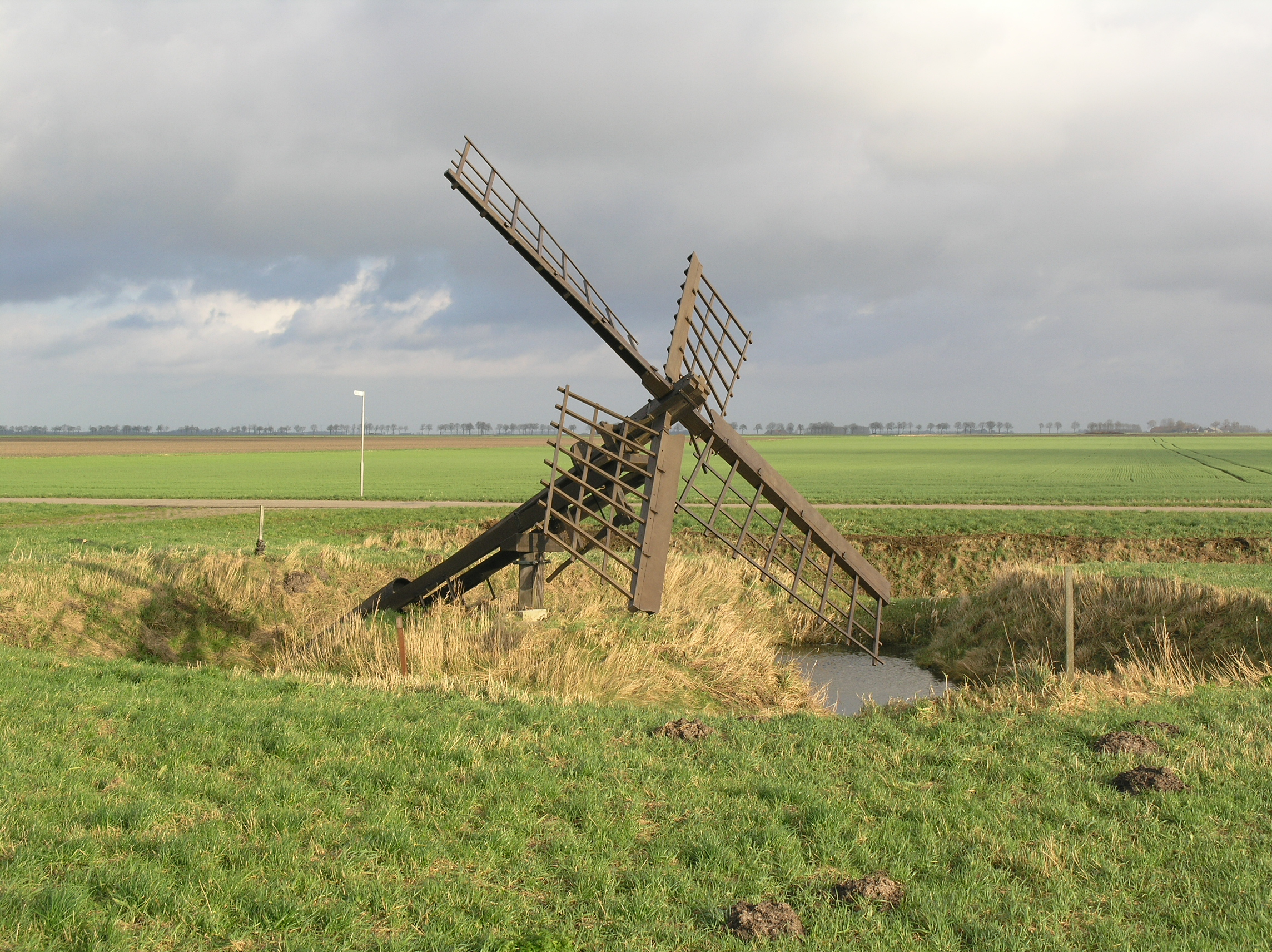
Tjasker Nieuw Scheemda, January 2007

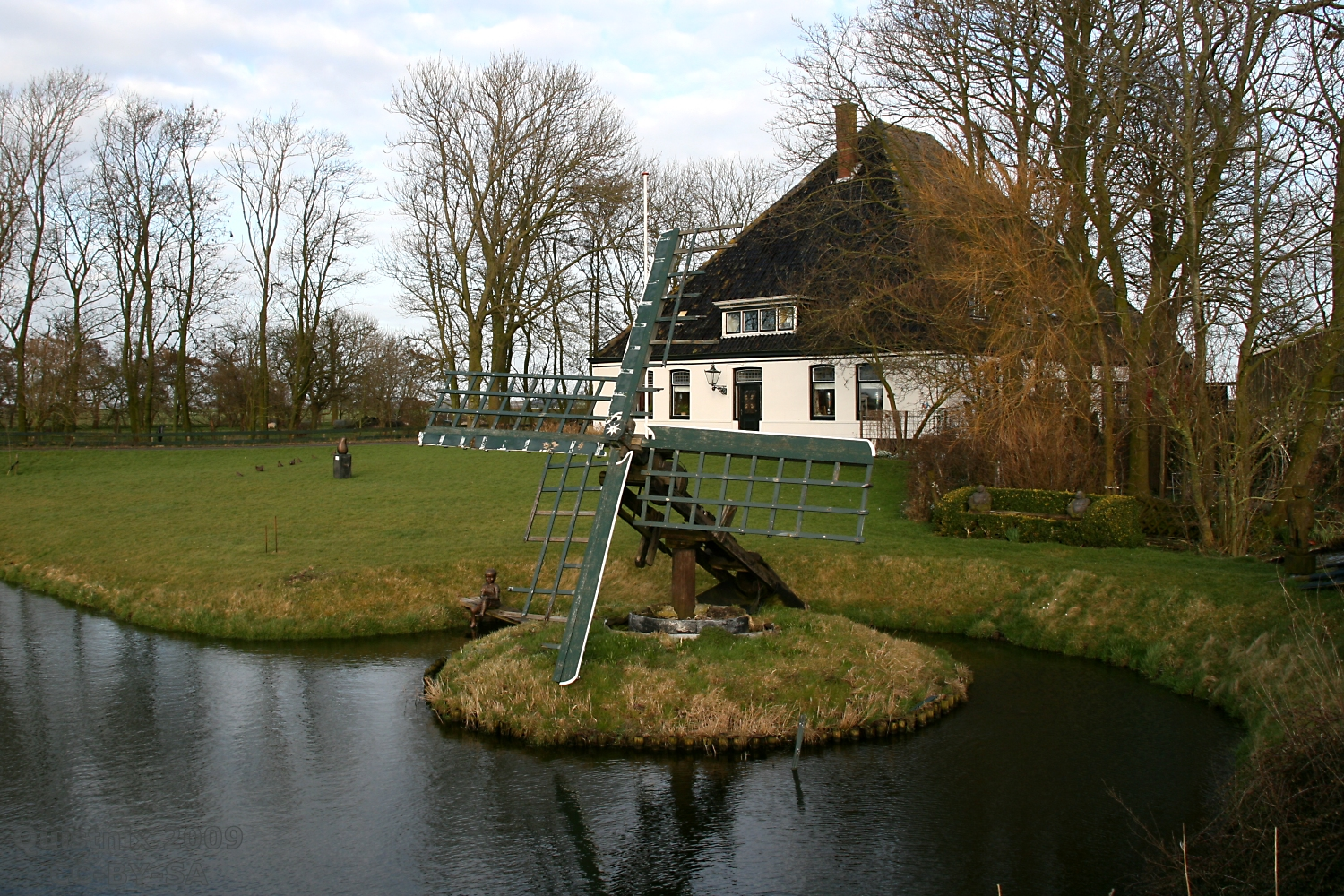
Tjasker Zuidschermer, March 2009

Most tjaskers are located in the three northern provinces, see:

- tjaskers in Friesland
- tjaskers in Overijssel
- tjaskers in Drenthe

The remainder is described below.

=== Amsterdam (North Holland) ===
52.309615°N 4.997347°E
The paaltjasker was built in 1978 for the Floriade (flower show) of 1982 and was left behind after its end. It was restored in 2003 after being derelict for some years, though it is not really functional because of its sheltered position. The tjasker has four Common sails. It is located in the public park surrounding the Gaasperplas lake and can be reached on foot.

=== Arnhem (Gelderland) ===
52.012970°N 5.914210°E
The boktjasker was built around 1875 near Wâlterswâld. It was donated to the Netherlands Open Air Museum and re-erected there in 1928 as a static object. It was moved to a different site in the museum grounds in 2002 after spending some years in storage though still not operational because of its sheltered wind free location. The tjasker has four Common sails, which have a span of 6.90 metres (22 ft 8 in), making it the largest tjasker in the Netherlands. It is also one of only three boktjaskers left in the Netherlands. The mill can be visited during opening hours of the museum.

=== Bleskensgraaf (South Holland) ===
51.860151°N 4.736659°E
The paaltjasker was built by Chiel de Graaf from Oud Verlaat for owner Aad Schouten in 1987. It is located next to hollow post mill Wingerdse Molen. The tjasker has four Common sails, which have a span of 4.10 metres (13 ft 5 in) and is fully functional.

=== Nieuw-Scheemda (Groningen) ===
53.199594°N 6.950521°E
The paaltjasker was built as an unemployment project of municipally Scheemda in 1992. It was erected near Midwolda to raise water into a small nature reserve. However this site proved problematic because of trees and shrubs and lack of public access so the mill was moved to Nieuw-Scheemda in 2001. It is now located close to drainage windmill De Dellen and is also operated by the volunteer miller of that mill. The tjasker has four Common sails, which have a span of 6.0 metres (19 ft 8 in). The mill is dismantled and stored indoors during the winter season and is owned by Molenstichting Oldambt.

=== Zuidschermer (North Holland) ===
52.574435°N 4.783233°E
The paaltjasker was built in 1987 and is located in front of the owners farmhouse. It was built by the former owner of the farmhouse J. Blakeman and has four Common sails, which have a span of 4.8 metres (15 ft 9 in).

== Dutch Wikipedia articles ==
- Tjasker Gaasperpark, Amsterdam
- Tjasker Arnhem
- Tjasker Zuidschermer
- Tjasker Nieuw-Scheemda
- Tjasker Zuidschermer
