= Dorothea Maria =

Dorothea Maria may refer to:

- Dorothea Maria of Anhalt (1574–1617)
- Dorothea Maria of Salm (1651–1702)
- Dorothea Maria of Saxe-Weimar, Duchess of Saxe-Zeitz (1641–1675)

== See also ==
- Archduchess Maria Dorothea of Austria (1867–1932)
- Duchess Maria Dorothea of Württemberg (1797–1855)
