= Batenburg =

- Small city
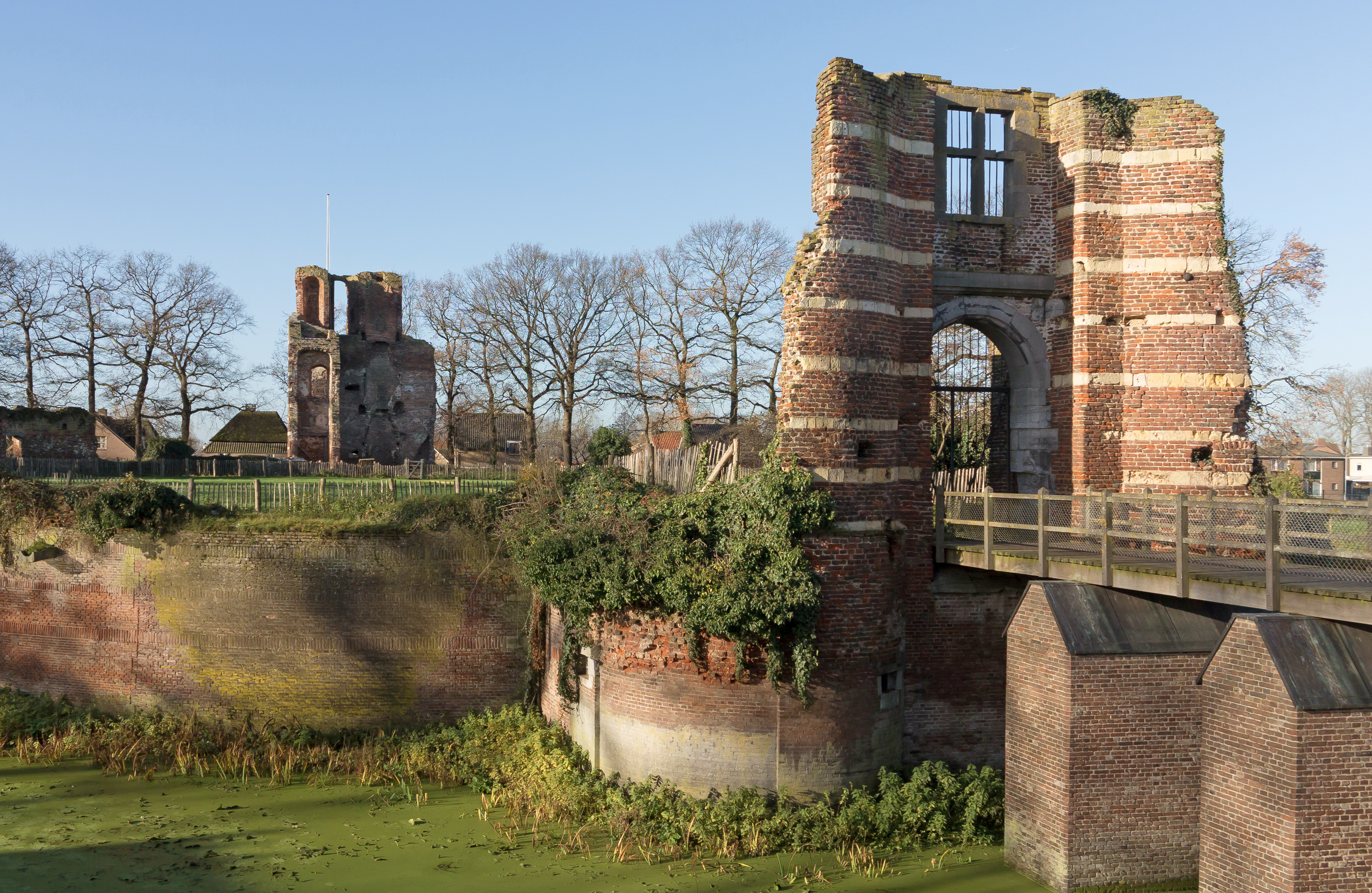
- Ruins of Batenburg Castle

- Flag Coat of arms

- Location in the Netherlands Batenburg (Netherlands)
- Coordinates: 51°49′24″N 5°37′40″E
- Country: Netherlands
- Province: Gelderland
- Municipality: Wijchen

Area
  - Total: 7.95 km^{2} (3.07 sq mi)
- Elevation: 9 m (30 ft)

Population (2021)
  - Total: 650
  - Density: 82/km^{2} (210/sq mi)
- Time zone: UTC+1 (CET)
  - Summer (DST): UTC+2 (CEST)
- Postal code: 6634
- Dialing code: 0487

Batenburg (Dutch pronunciation: [ˈbaːtə(m)bʏr(ə)x]) is a city in the municipality of Wijchen, in the Dutch province of Gelderland. It is located on the Meuse, about 15 km west of Nijmegen. It is well known for the remains of a medieval fort in the center of the town. Batenburg received city rights in 1349. Until 1984, Batenburg was a separate municipality.

It was first mentioned in 1166 as Battenburg. The etymology in unclear. Batenburg developed around Batenburg Castle. In 1347, it received city rights., and by 1400, had walls and two city gates. The castle dated from the mid-12th century. It was destroyed and rebuilt many times until 1795 and was later used as a stone quarry. The medieval Dutch Reformed Church was heavily damaged around 1600 and rebuilt between 1608 and 1634 without a choir. The tower dates from the early 15th century. The city did not develop, and was home to 441 people in 1840.

== Gallery ==
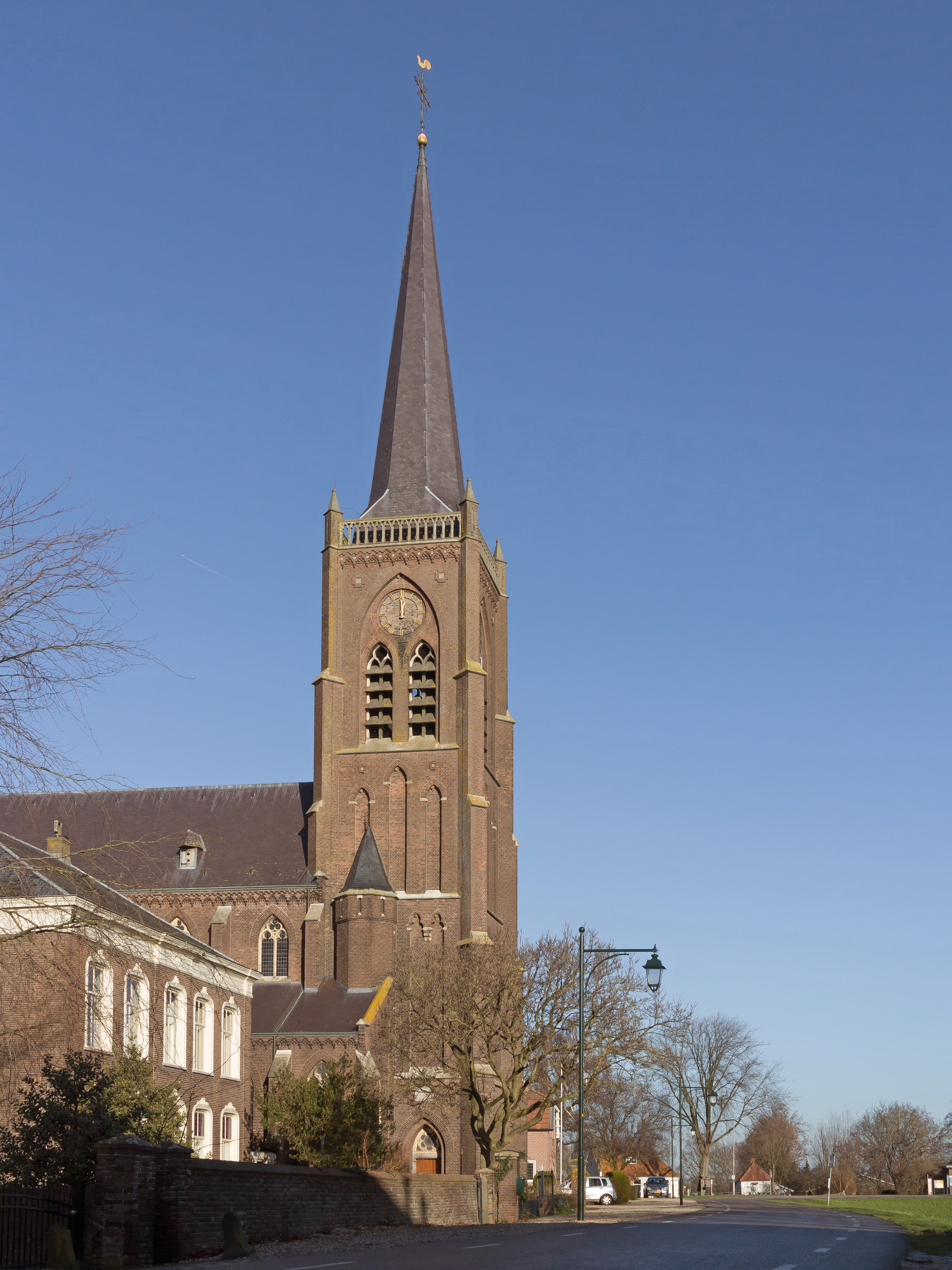
Church: de Sint Victorkerk

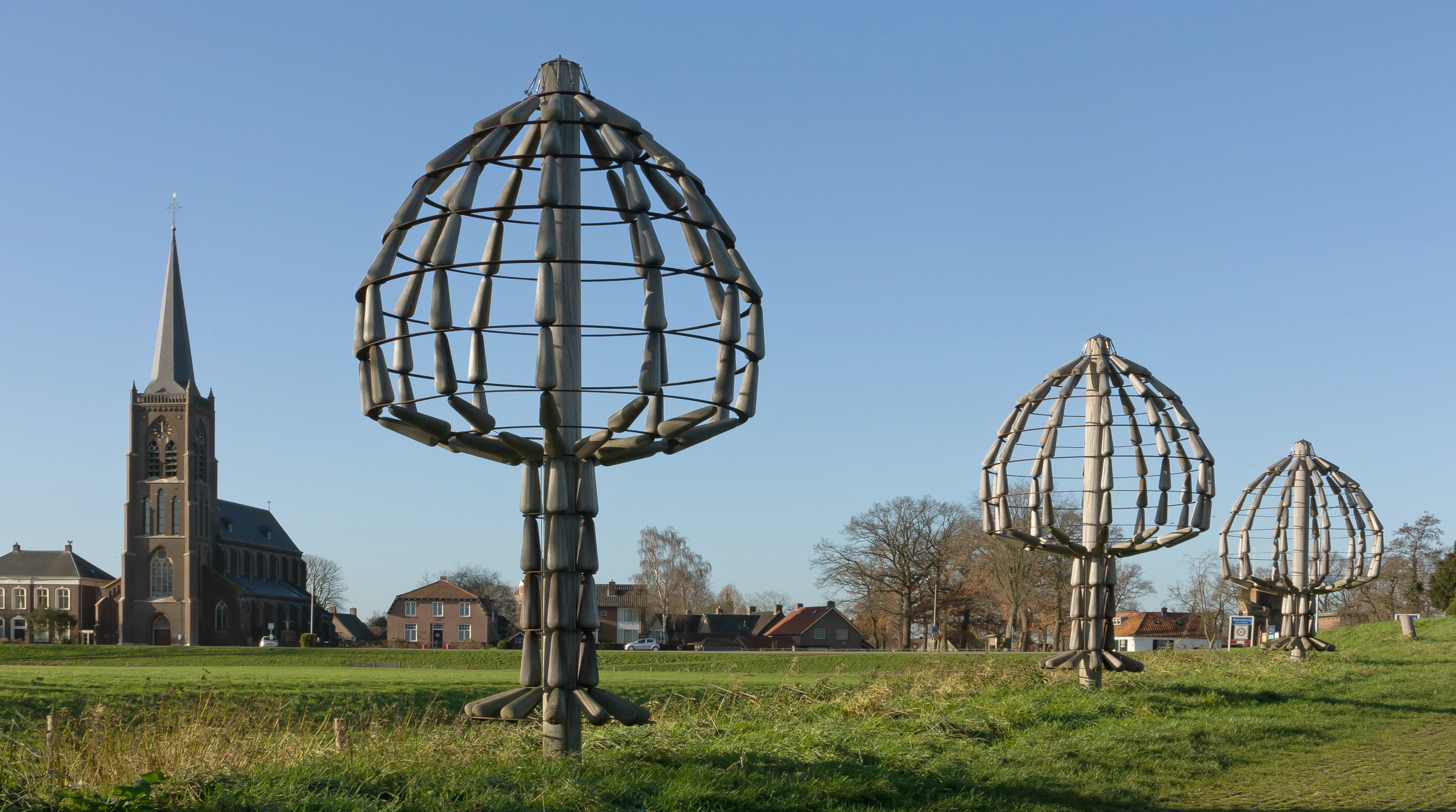
Sculpture (de Boombeelden) designed by Marc de Roover

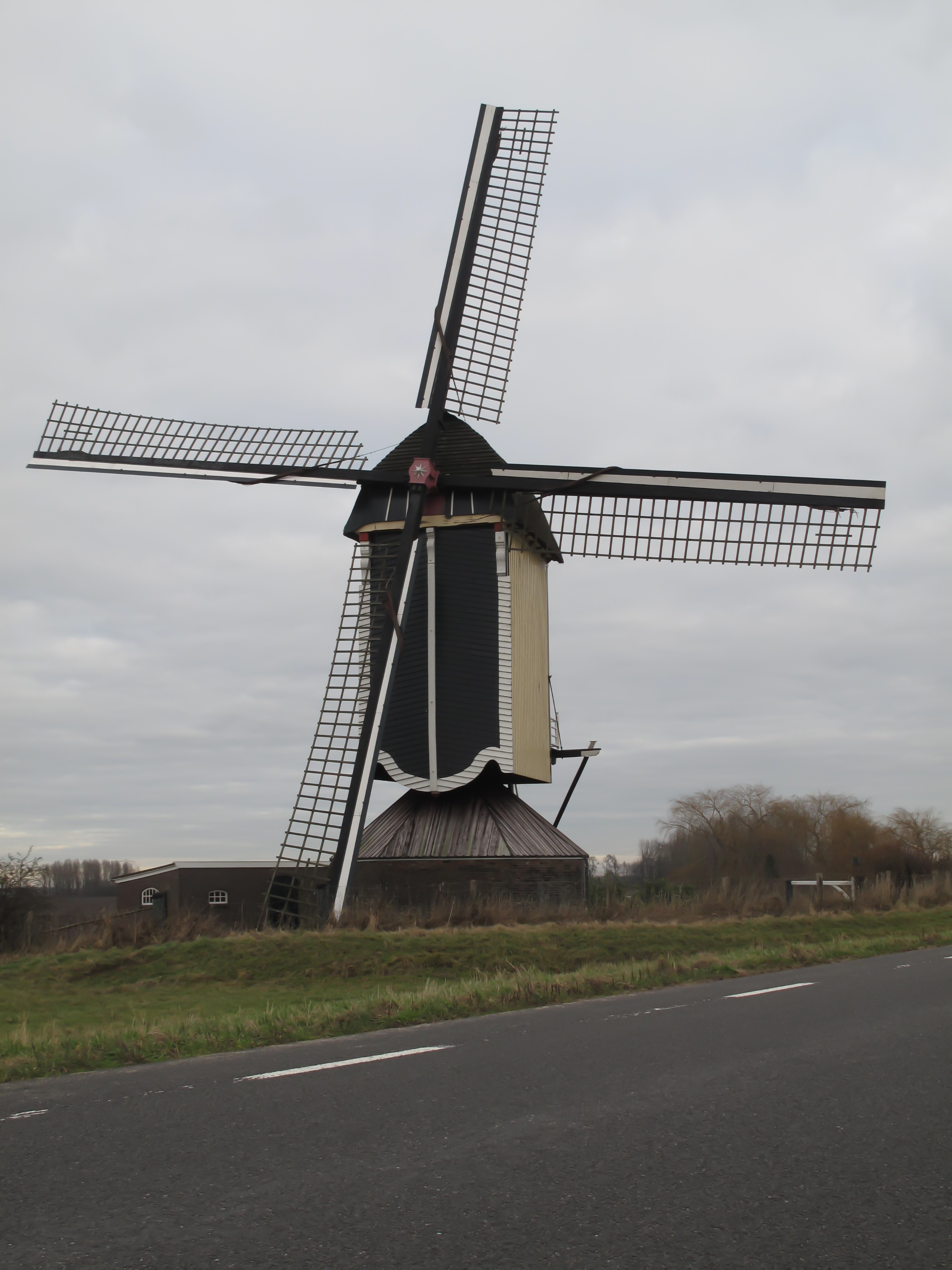
Batenburg Windmill

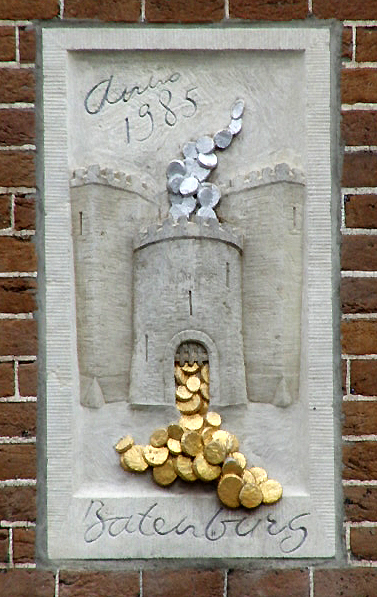
Batenburg gevelsteen, Prinsengracht, Amsterdam
