= Dorothea Maria of Salm =

Dorothea Maria zu Salm (in French: Dorothée-Marie de Salm) (1651-1702), was a German-Roman monarch as Princess Abbess of the immediate Imperial Remiremont Abbey in the Duchy of Lorraine which then formed a part of the Holy Roman Empire, but later on was annexed by France in 1766.

== Early life ==
Dorothea Maria zu Salm was the eldest daughter of Prince Leopold Philipp Karl zu Salm (1620-1663) and his wife, Countess Maria Anna von Bronckhorst-Batenburg (1624-1661), heiress of Anholt.

== Reign ==
She was elected Coadjutrice as a child, with the right to succeed the existing abbess, Princess Anne Marie Thérèse de Lorraine. She was chosen by dispensation from the Pope, despite being below the elective age of 25. The abbess at the time was also a child, and Remiremont was ruled by the Dame Doyenne, Hélène d'Anglure, and the Dame Sonière Bernarde de Cléron de Saffre (fl. 1704). When Anne Marie Thérèse de Lorraine died in 1661, Dorothea Maria succeeded her, with the same guardian government. Hélène d'Anglure died in 1666, but her successor as Dame Doyenne, Bernarde de Cléron de Saffre, refused to resign her regency to Dorothea Maria. In 1677, Dorothea Maria moved to the chateau Neuviller-sur-Moselle 3 days from Remiremont and engaged in a long lasting conflict about her rights to rule Remiremont. In 1691, both parties appeared before the French monarch as mediator. Dorothea Maria appointed her sister Princess Maria Christina of Salm (b. 1653), abbess of Remiremont as "Second-in-Command" in 1700, and Christina was therefore made regent in Remiremont during the minority of Princess Béatrice Hiéronyme de Lorraine in 1702-1711.
