= Balgoij =

- Village
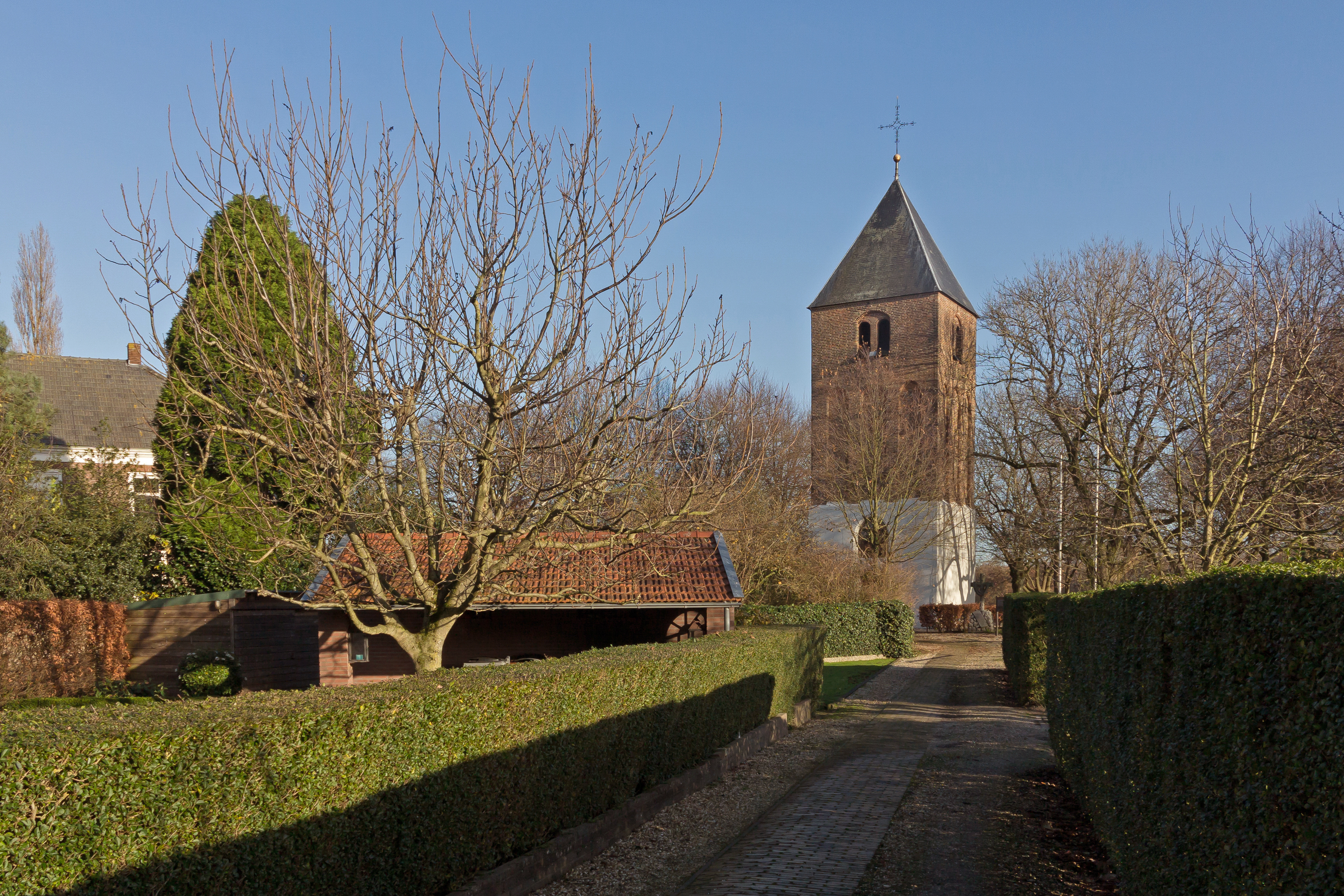
- Tower of the former village church

- Location in the Netherlands Balgoij (Netherlands)
- Coordinates: 51°46′49″N 5°42′50″E
- Country: Netherlands
- Province: Gelderland
- Municipality: Wijchen

Area
  - Total: 4.71 km^{2} (1.82 sq mi)
- Elevation: 8 m (26 ft)

Population (2021)
  - Total: 725
  - Density: 154/km^{2} (399/sq mi)
- Time zone: UTC+1 (CET)
  - Summer (DST): UTC+2 (CEST)
- Postal code: 6613
- Dialing code: 024

Balgoij or Balgoy (Dutch pronunciation: [bɑlˈɣoːi̯]) is a village in Gelderland, Netherlands, near the river Meuse. It belongs to the Wijchen municipality.

Until 1923, Balgoij was a separate municipality. In 1958, the hamlet of Keent was transferred to Oss in North Brabant due to the canalisation of the Maas.

The village was first mentioned in 1172 as Balgoie, and means swelling of land near water. In 1840, it was home to 406 people.

== Gallery ==
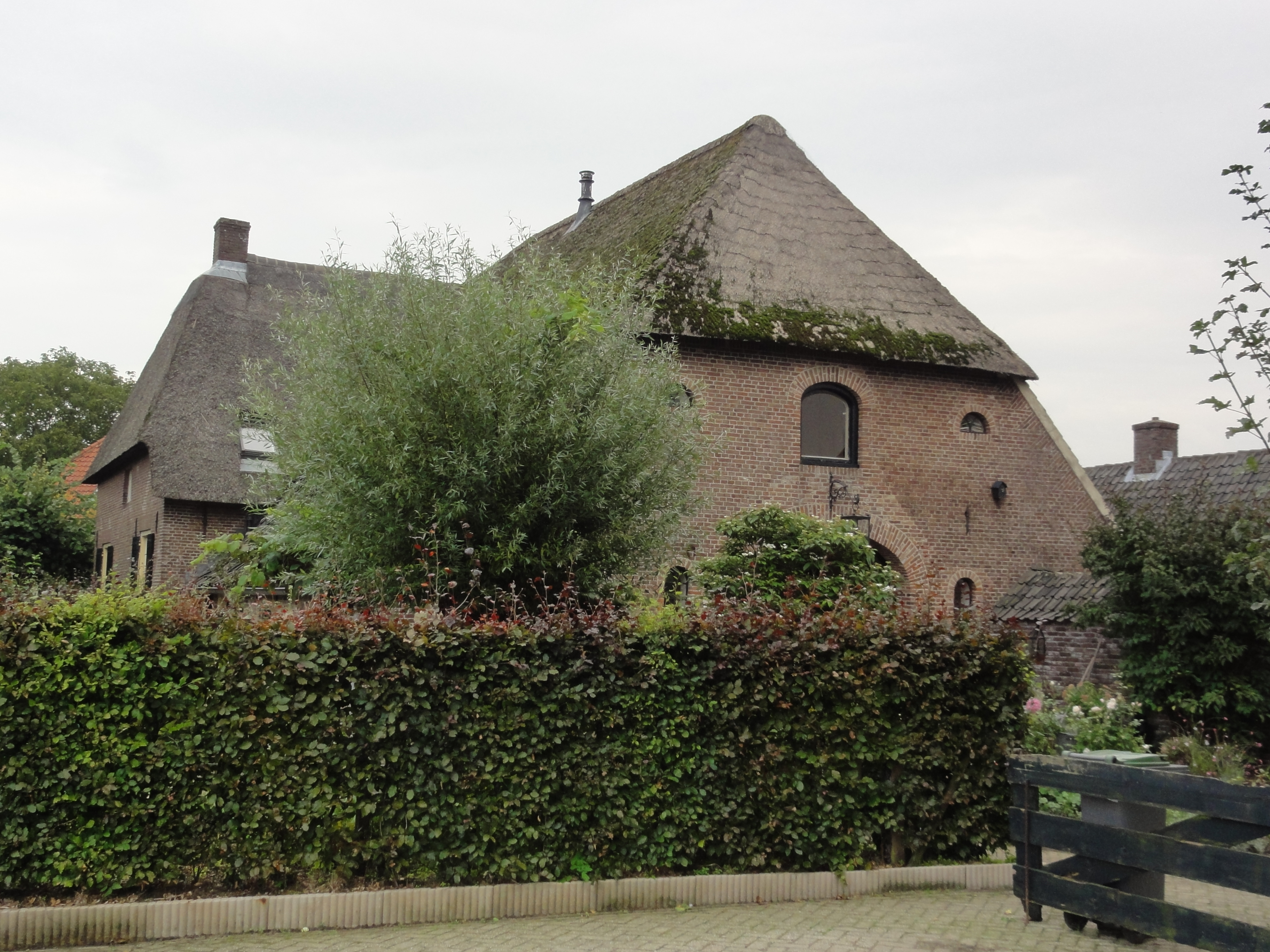
Church in Balgoij

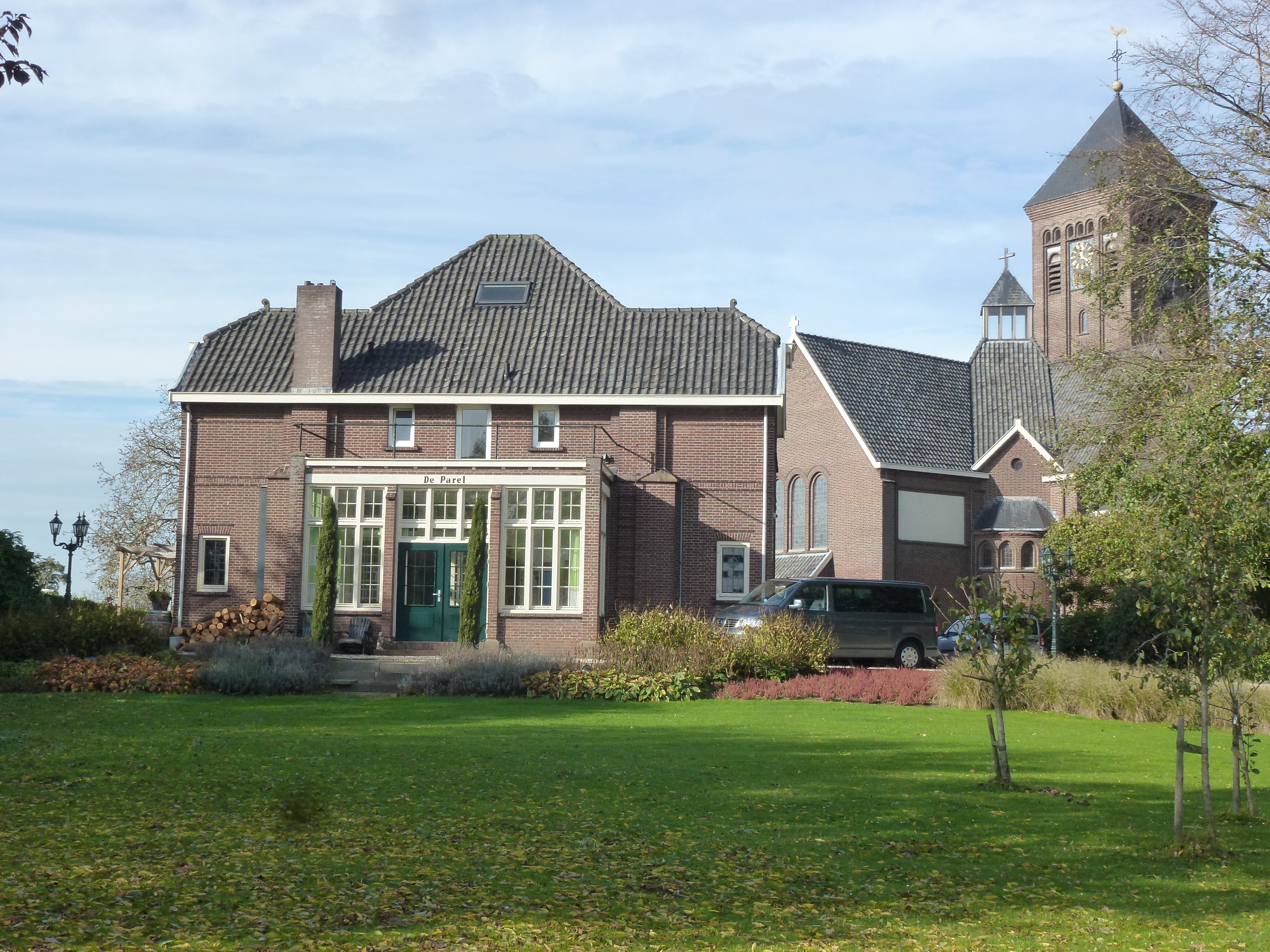
Former clergy house

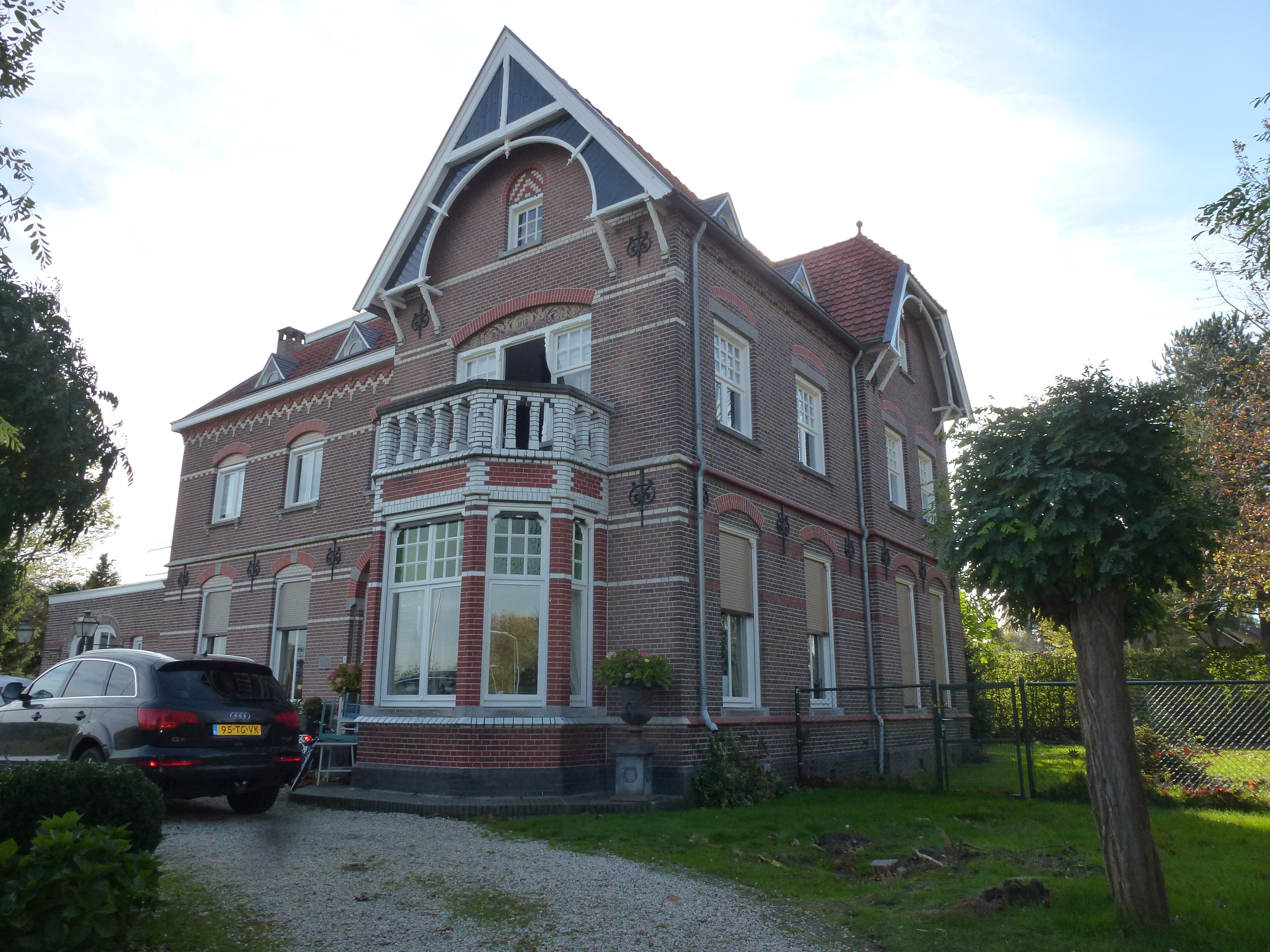
Villa in Balgoij
