= Hernen =

- Village
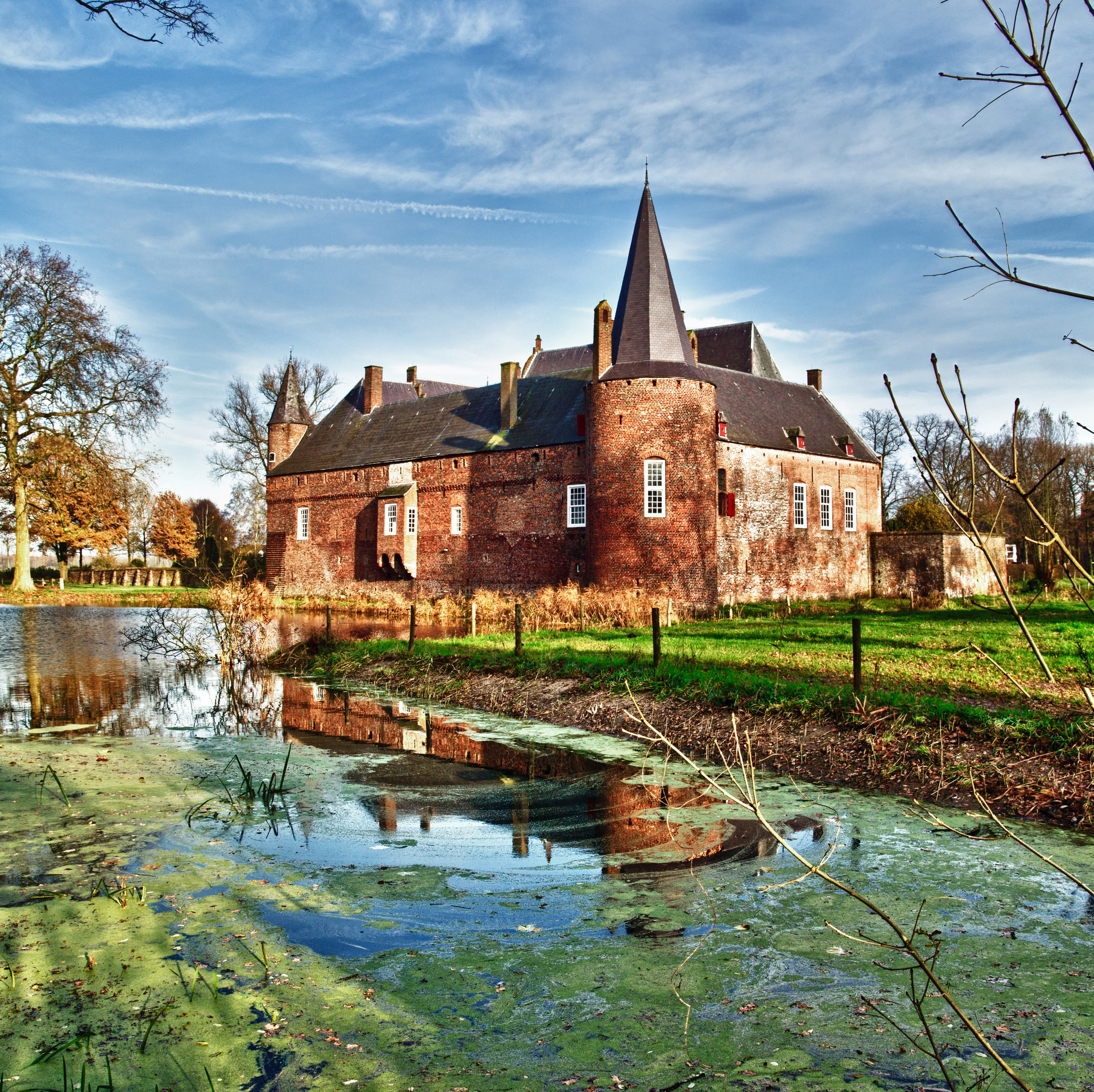
- Castle of Hernen

- Location in the province of Gelderland in the Netherlands Hernen (Netherlands)
- Coordinates: 51°49′59″N 5°40′50″E
- Country: Netherlands
- Province: Gelderland
- Municipality: Wijchen

Area
  - Total: 6.78 km^{2} (2.62 sq mi)
- Elevation: 8 m (26 ft)

Population (2021)
  - Total: 960
  - Density: 140/km^{2} (370/sq mi)
- Time zone: UTC+1 (CET)
  - Summer (DST): UTC+2 (CEST)
- Postal code: 6616
- Dialing code: 0487

Hernen (Dutch pronunciation: [ˈɦɛrnə(n)]) is a village in the Dutch province of Gelderland. It is located in the municipality of Wijchen, about 13 km west of Nijmegen.

== History ==
The village was first mentioned around 1214 as Harnen, and may mean "stony place". Hernen developed on a ridge around Huis te Hernen.

Huis te Hernen was a castle which dates from the 14th century and consists of a round tower and four wings around a central square. It was originally a square keep surrounded by a wall. The eastern wing with gate was the last addition in 1555.

Hernen was home to 450 people in 1840. The Catholic St Judocus Church was built between 1891 and 1892. Hernen was a separate municipality until 1818, when it was merged with Bergharen.

== Gallery ==
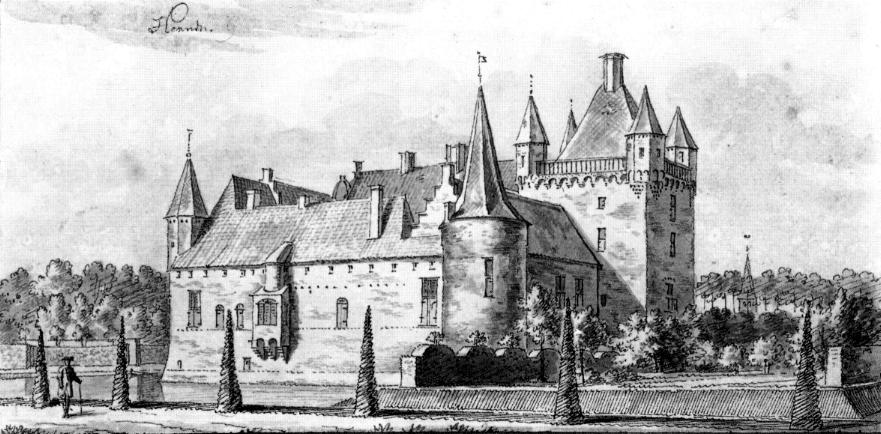
Castle of Hernen

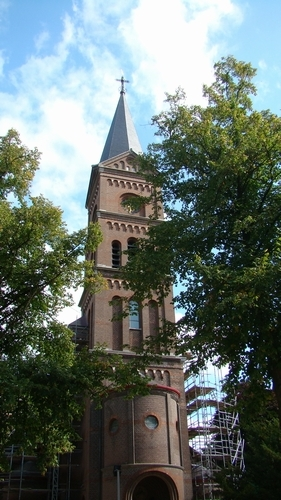
Church of Hernen

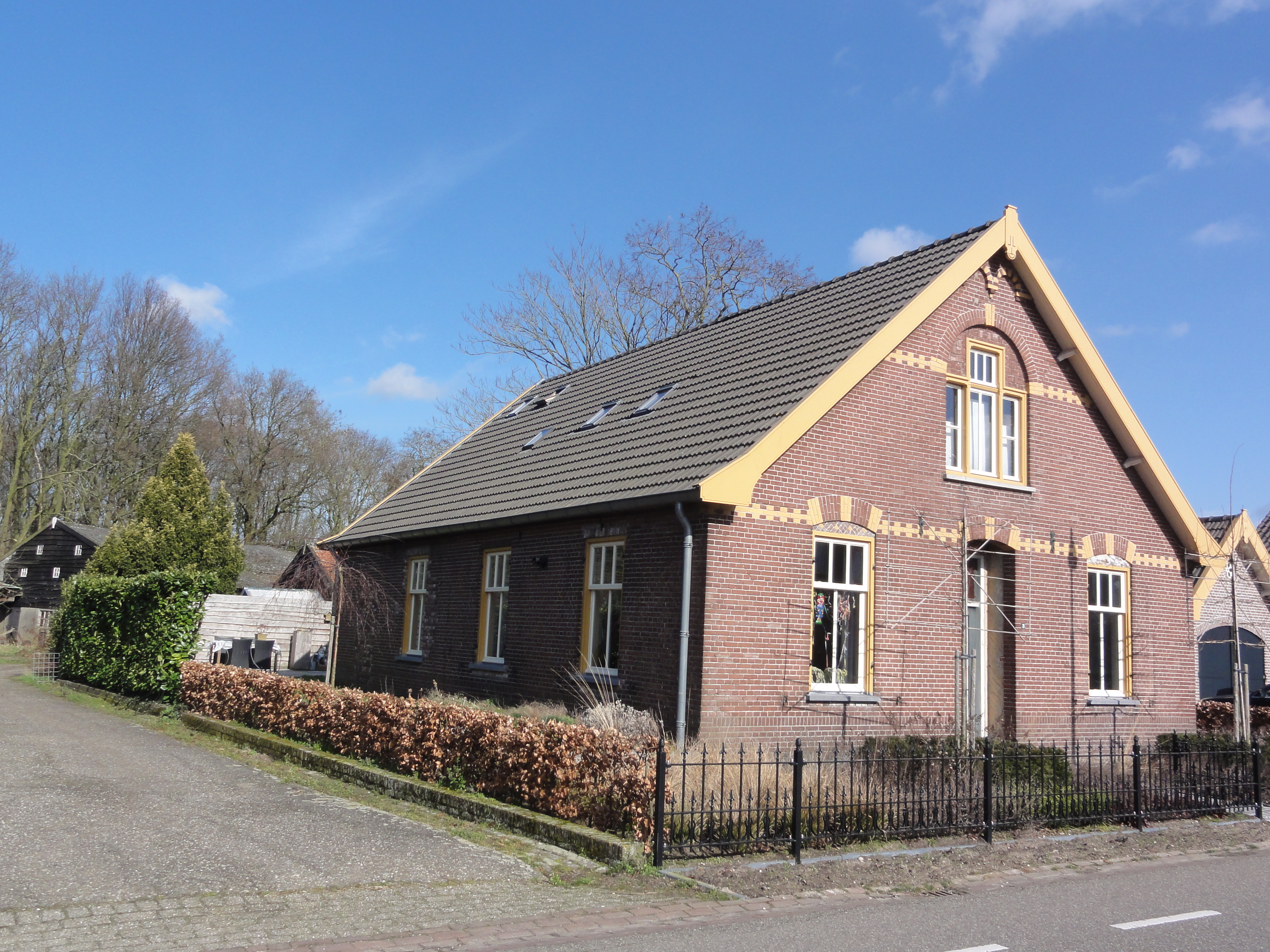
Farm in Hernen

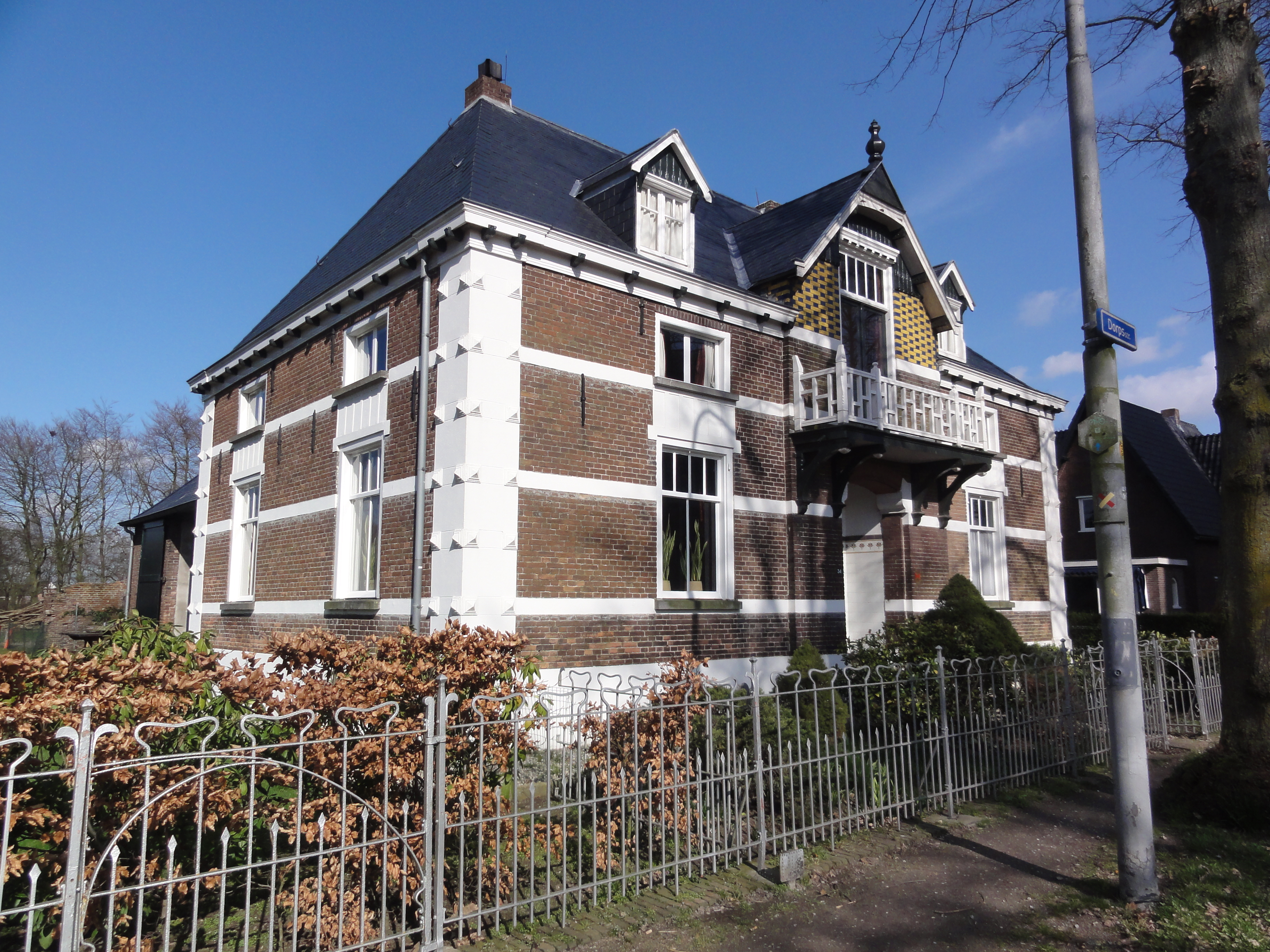
Villa in Hernen
