= Wijchen =

- City and Municipality
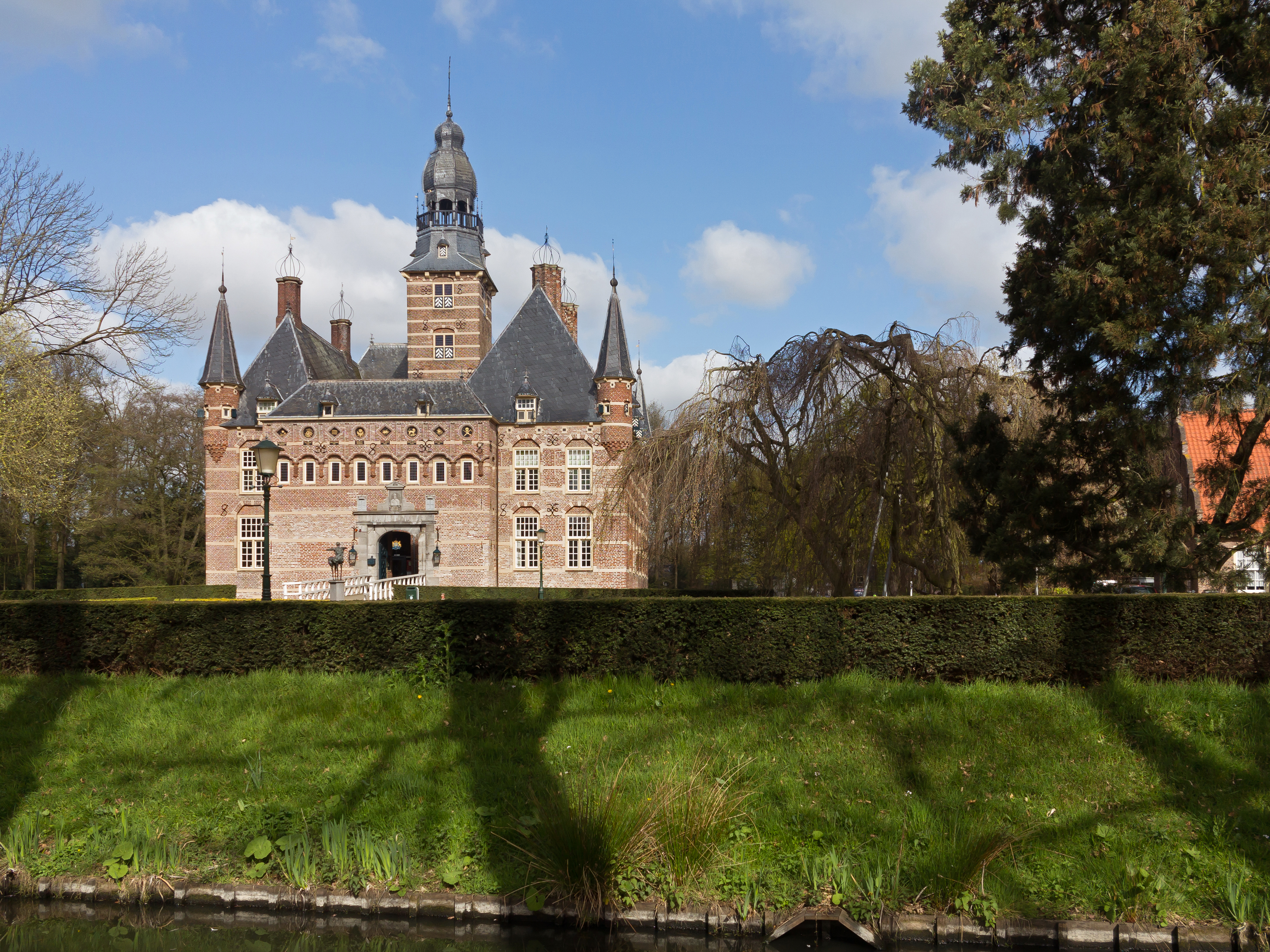
- Wijchen castle

- Flag Coat of arms

- Location in Gelderland

- Location within Gelderland Location within Netherlands
- Coordinates: 51°48′N 5°44′E
- Country: Netherlands
- Province: Gelderland

Government
  - Body: Municipal council
  - Mayor: Renske Helmer-Englebert (SP - Socialist Party)

Area
  - Total: 69.56 km^{2} (26.86 sq mi)
  - Land: 66.18 km^{2} (25.55 sq mi)
  - Water: 3.38 km^{2} (1.31 sq mi)
- Elevation: 9 m (30 ft)

Population (January 2021)
  - Total: 41,261
  - Density: 623/km^{2} (1,610/sq mi)
- Demonym: Wijchenaar
- Time zone: UTC+1 (CET)
  - Summer (DST): UTC+2 (CEST)
- Postcode: 6600–6606, 6613–6617, 6634
- Area code: 024, 0486, 0487
- Website: www.wijchen.nl

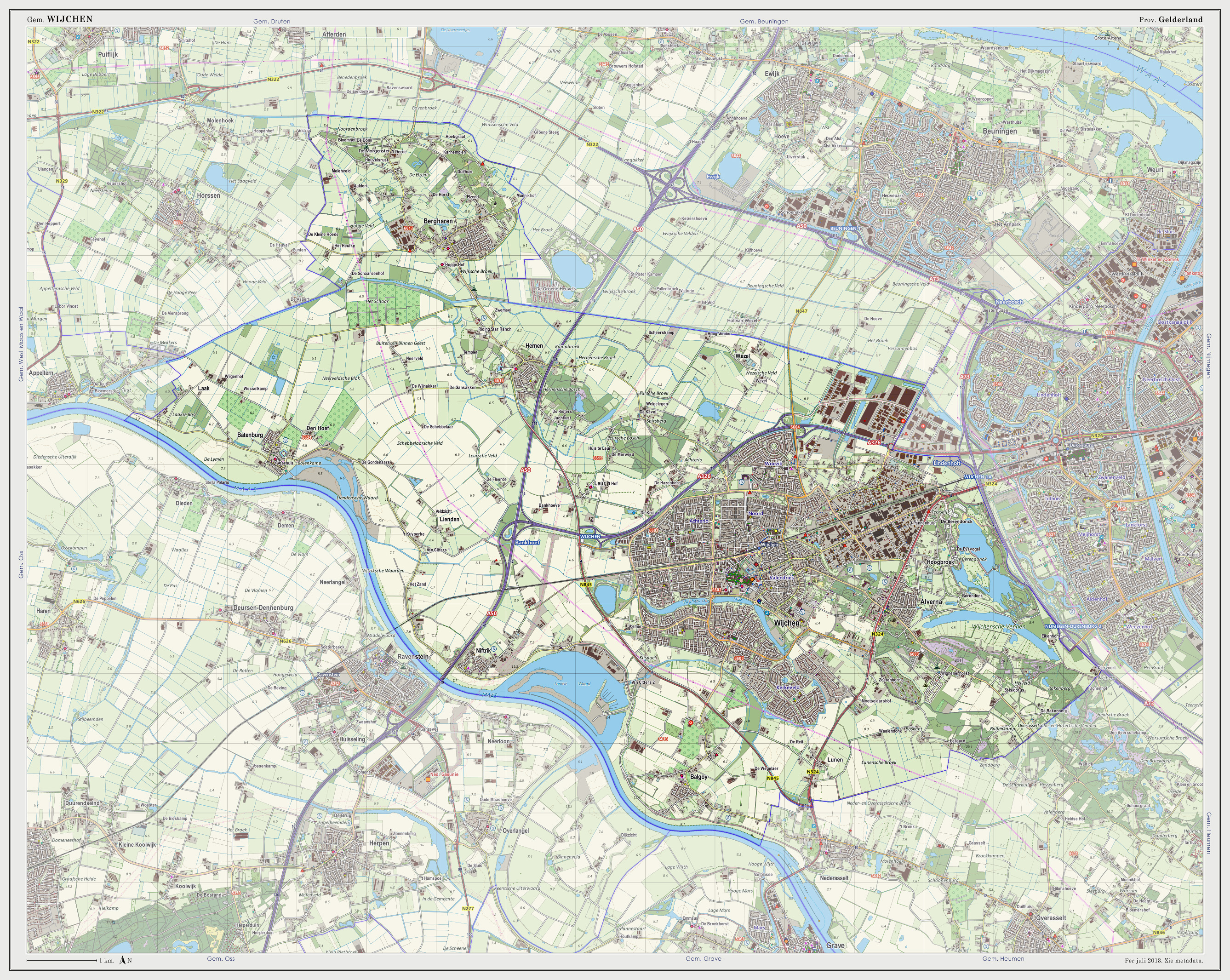
Dutch Topographic map of Wijchen, July 2013

Wijchen (Dutch pronunciation: ʋixə(n)) is a municipality and a collection of towns in the province of Gelderland, in the eastern part of the Netherlands.

== Population centres ==
Number of residents per population centre per 2025:

Wijchen (core)	32,904
Alverna	2,465
Bergharen	1,765
Hernen	960
Balgoij	750
Batenburg	670
Niftrik	425
Outer Wijchen	295
Leur	120
Wijchen (total)	41,836

Source: Statistics Netherlands, 2025.

The population centre Woezik (3,820 residents on 1 January 2005) and the township Laak are statistically included in Wijchen.

== Neighbourhoods ==
Neighbourhoods in Wijchen include:

- Centre: Kloosterakker
- Wijchen-Oost: Valendries, Oosterweg and Uilenboom.
- Woezik: Veenhof and Saltshof.
- Wijchen-Noord.
- Achterlo: Homberg, Heilige Stoel and Kraaijenberg.
- Wijchen-West: Blauwe Hof and Aalsburg.
- Wijchen-Zuid: Abersland, Diepvoorde, Huissteden, Hoogmeer, De Ververt, De Geer, Elsland, De Weertjes, De Grippen, Zesakkers, Zevendreef, Sluiskamp, Oudelaan, and Kronenland.
- Kerkeveld: De Gamert, De Meren, Diemenwei, De Flier, De Lingert.
- Huurlingsedam.

Streets in most neighbourhoods are numbered instead of named. This is not common practice in the Netherlands, therefore the street numbers are included in the house numbering. E.g. someone living in Abersland, 11th street, house #05 will usually use Abersland 1105 in his address.

== Wijchen Castle (town hall) ==
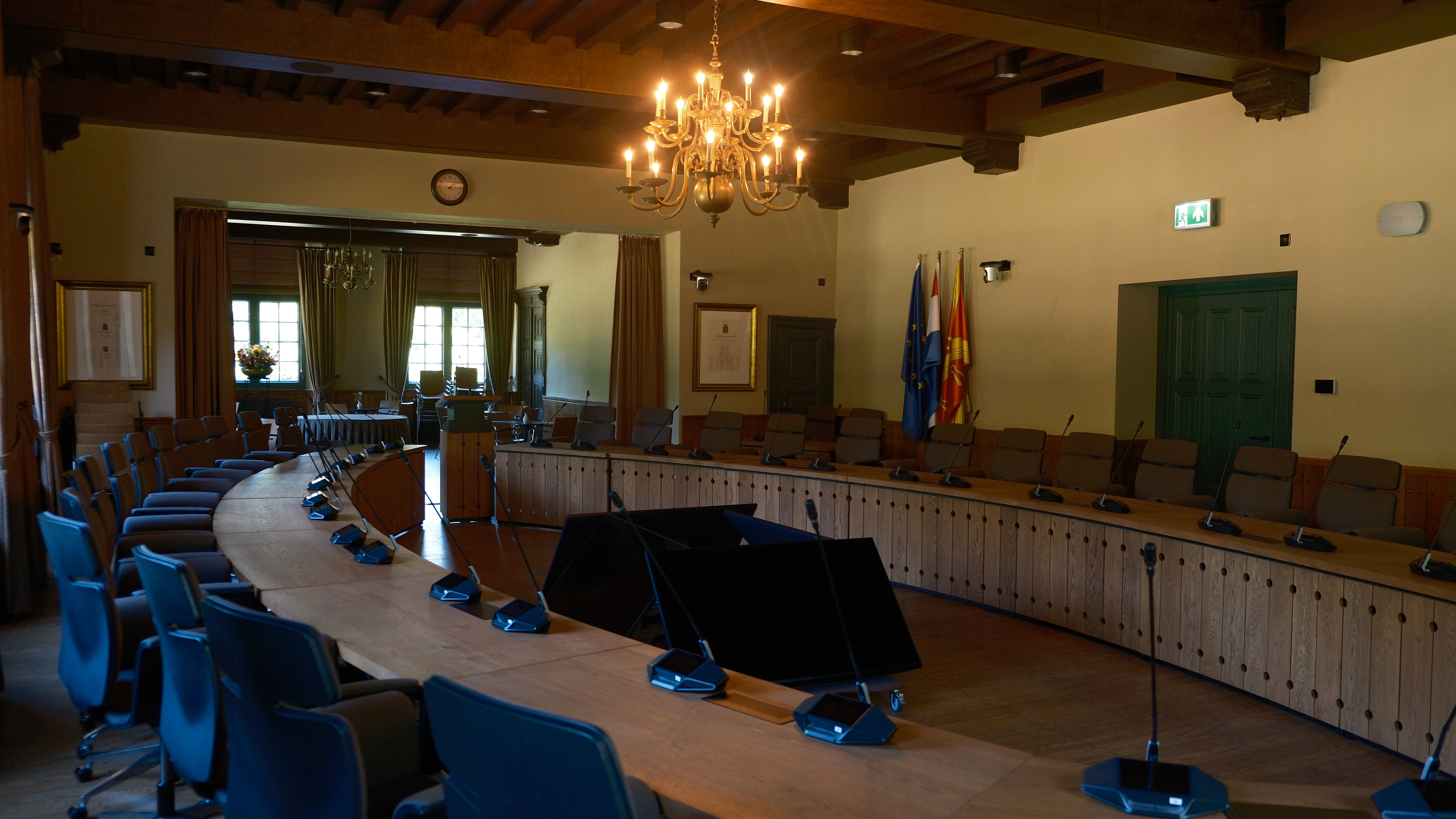
Room in the castle used for town council meetings

Parts of Wijchen Castle (Kasteel Wijchen in Dutch) date from the 14th century, but it took its current Mannerist form in the years 1609–1629. It is surrounded by a moat and used to serve as the town hall. Currently, the town hall is down the road, while the castle is only used for important meetings. It is also used as a wedding location.

== Notable residents ==
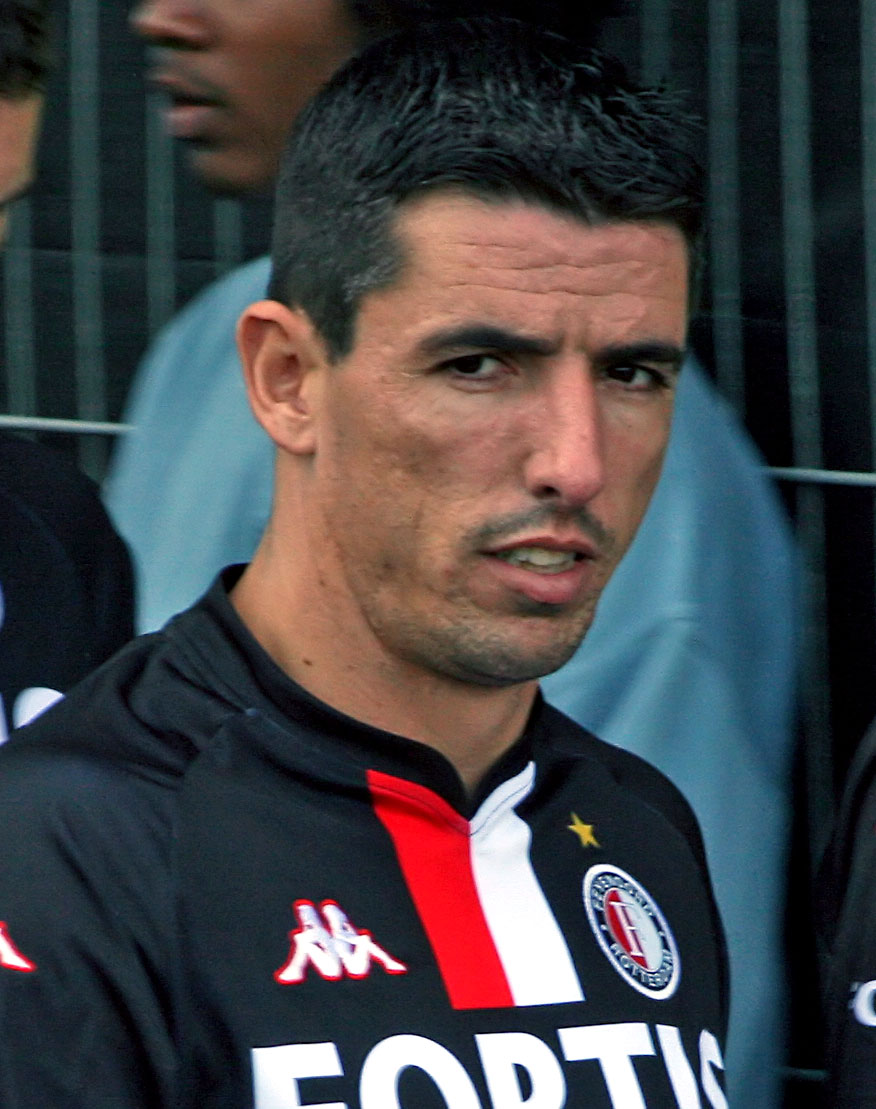
Roy Makaay, 2007

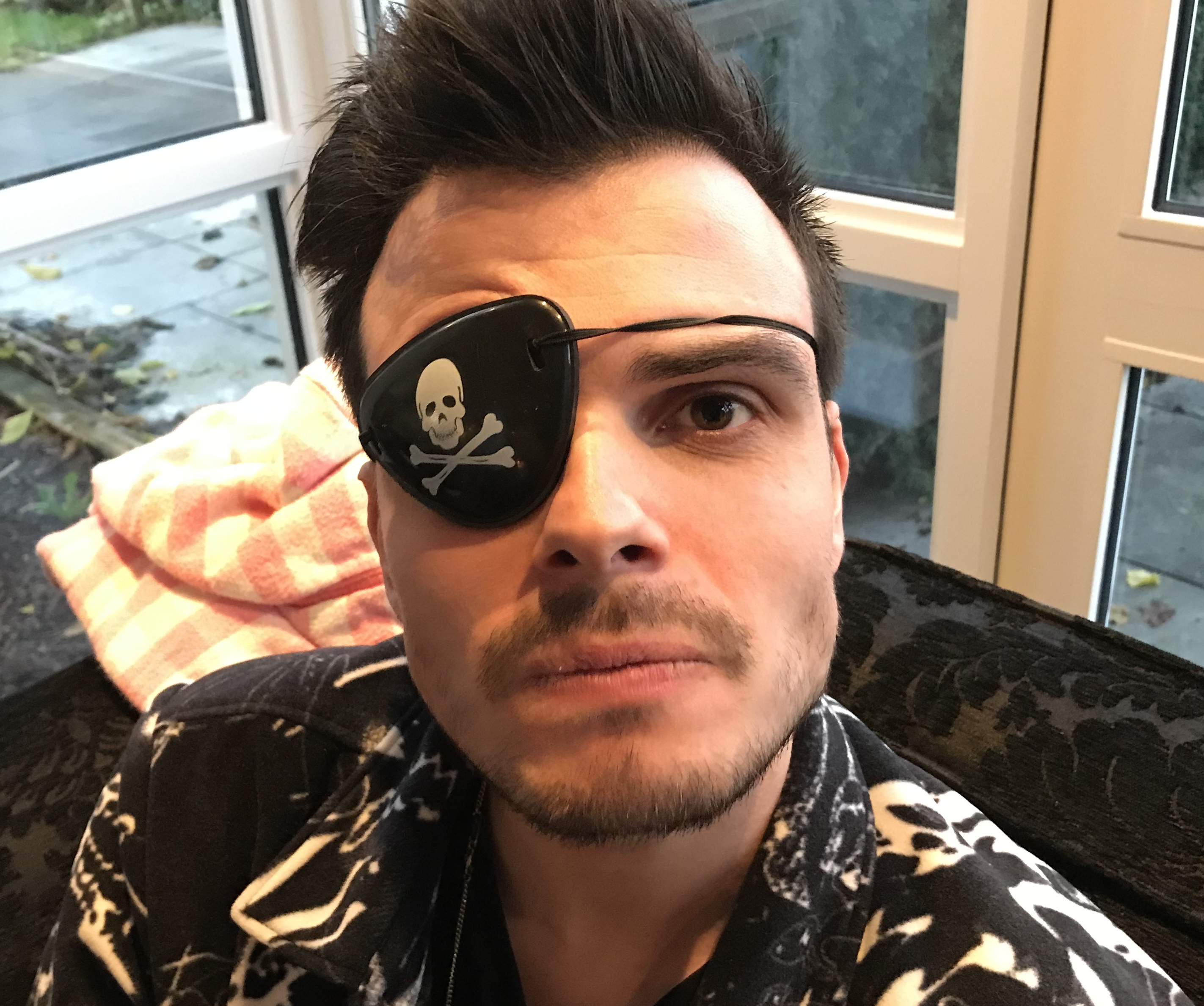
SWACQ, DJ

- Ine Lamers (born 1954) photographer and video installation artist
- Ronald van der Kemp (born 1964) fashion designer
- Arjen Thonen (born 1992) DJ and music producer better known as SWACQ^{[NL]}

=== Sport ===
- Fred Rutten (born 1962) a football coach and a former footballer with 317 caps
- Ralf Elshof (born 1962) cyclist, competed at the 1984 Summer Olympics
- Roy Makaay (born 1975) football manager and former footballer with 526 caps
- Claudia van Thiel (born 1977) volleyball player, competed at the 1996 Summer Olympics
- Lieke Klaus (born 1989) BMX racer
- Joel Piroe (born 1999) footballer, Leeds United

== Gallery ==
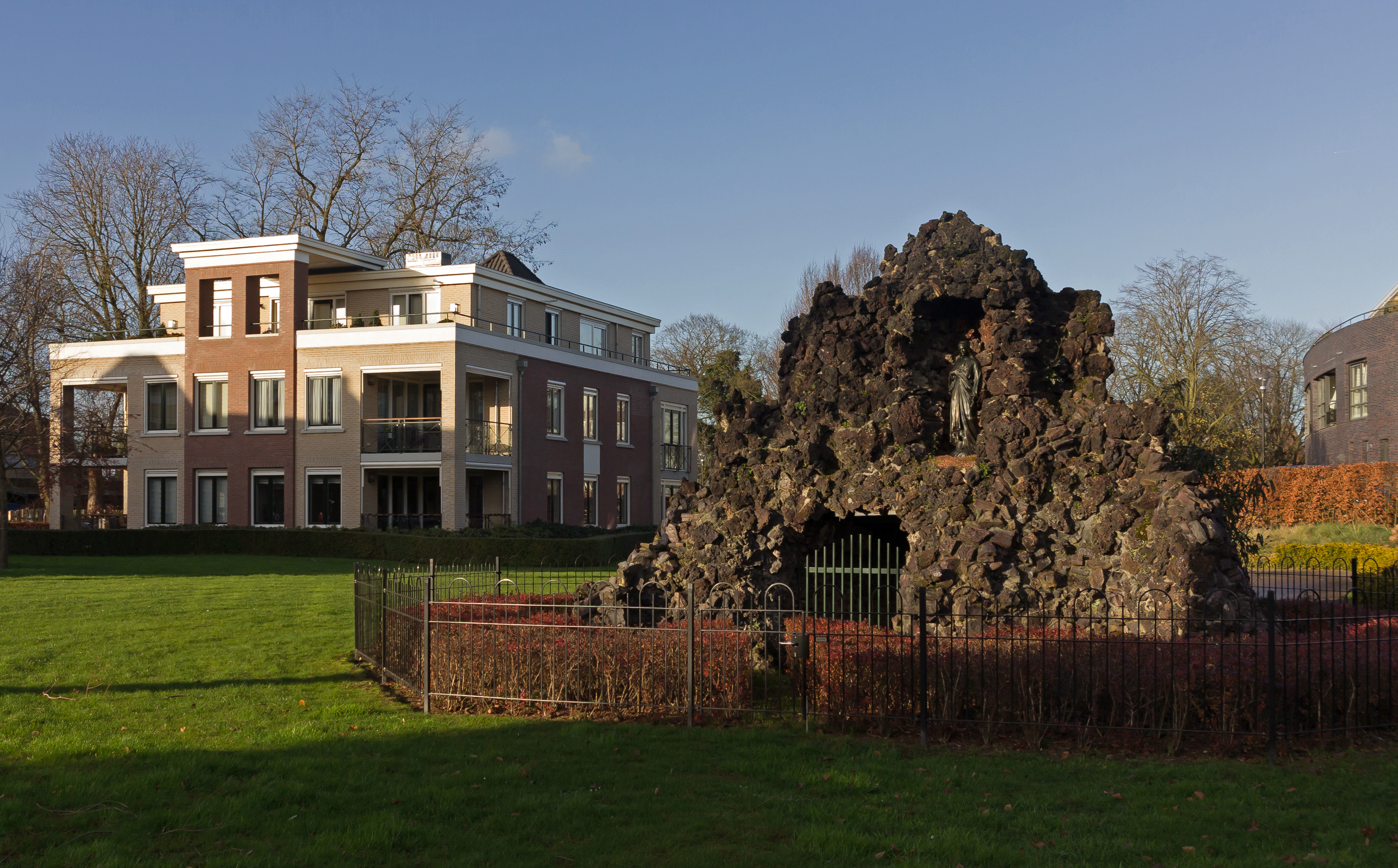
Wijchen, Lourdes cave near het Laantje

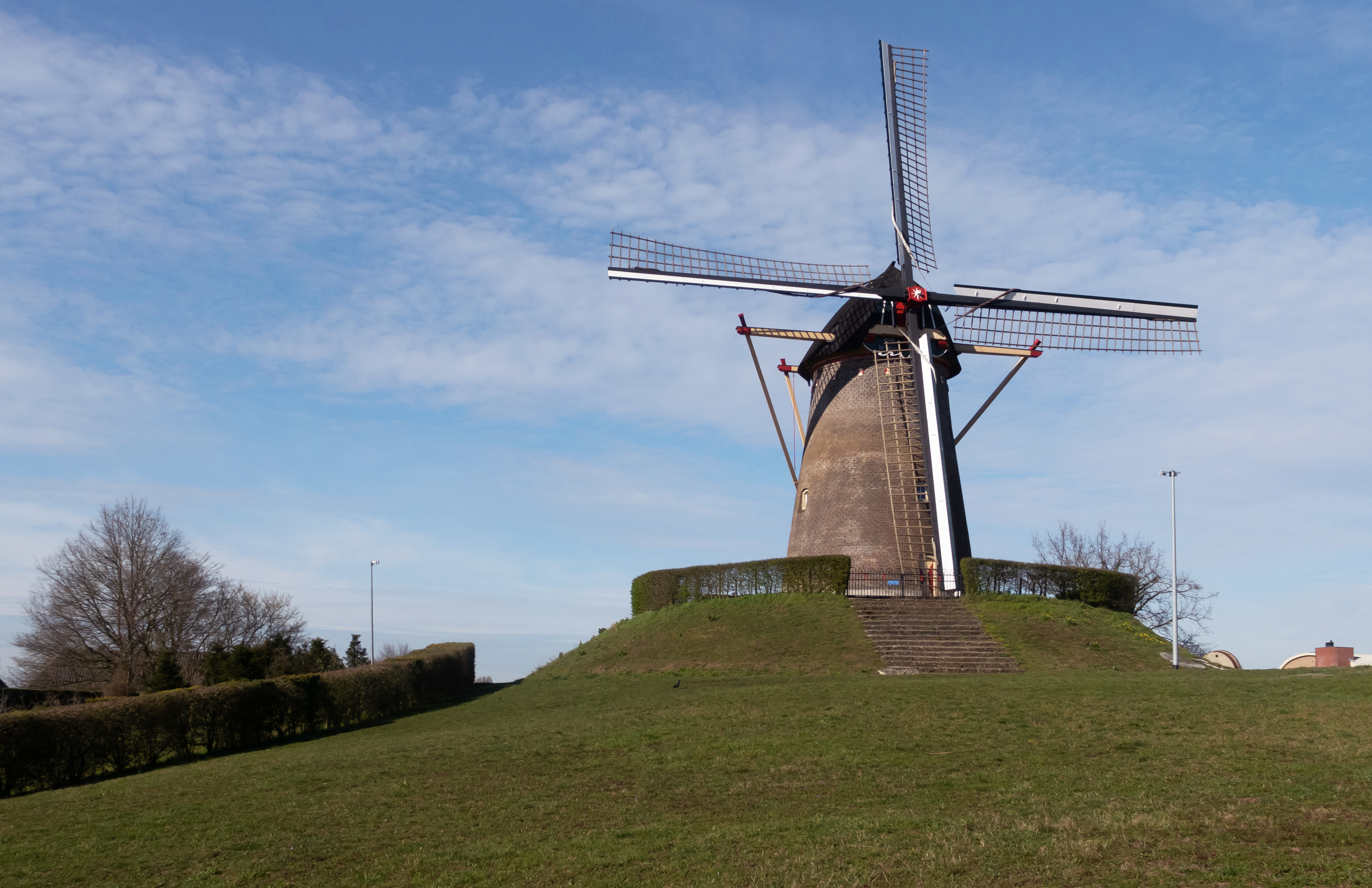
Wijchen, windmill: de Oude Molen

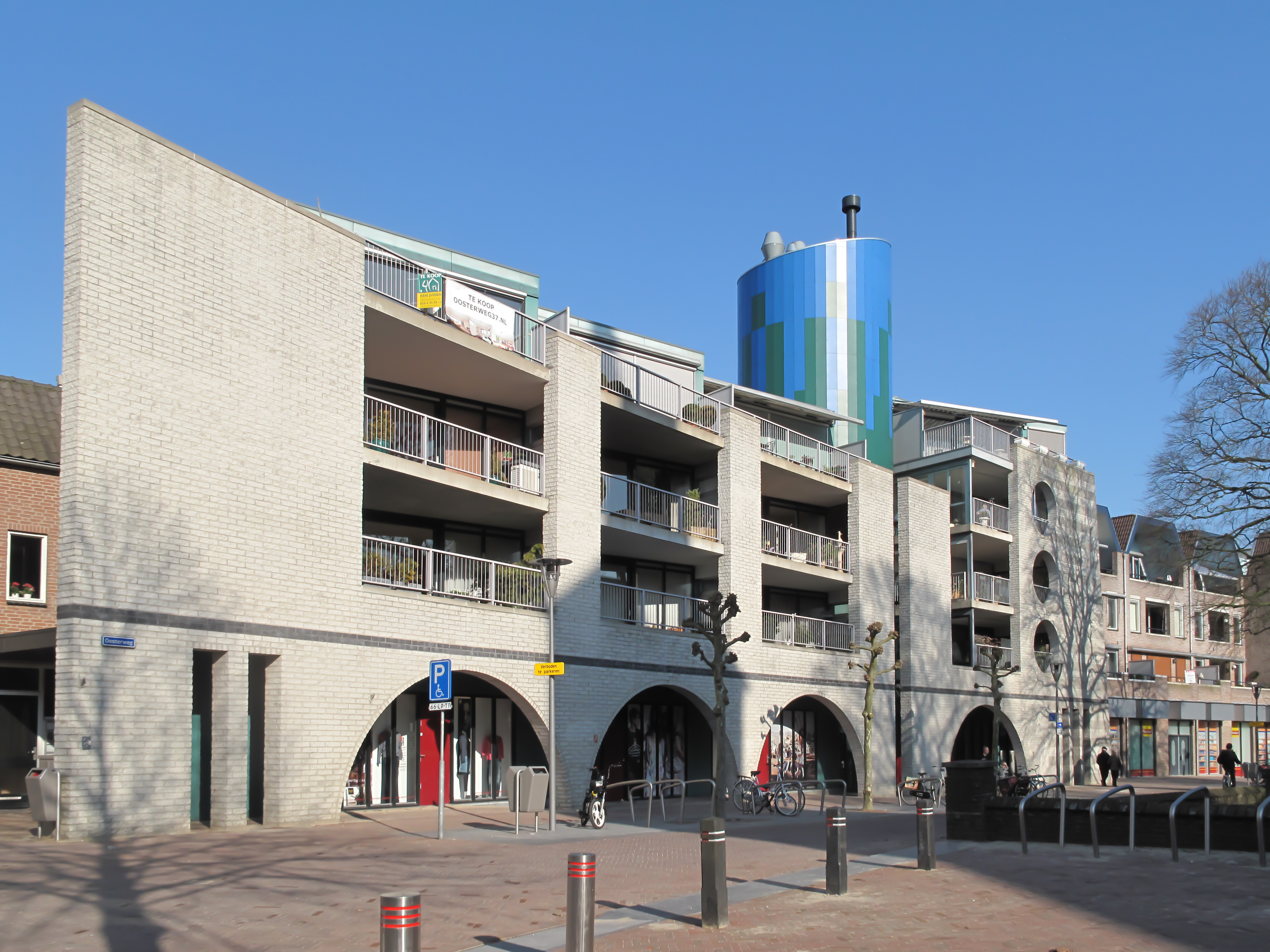
Wijchen, modern living appartements on the church square

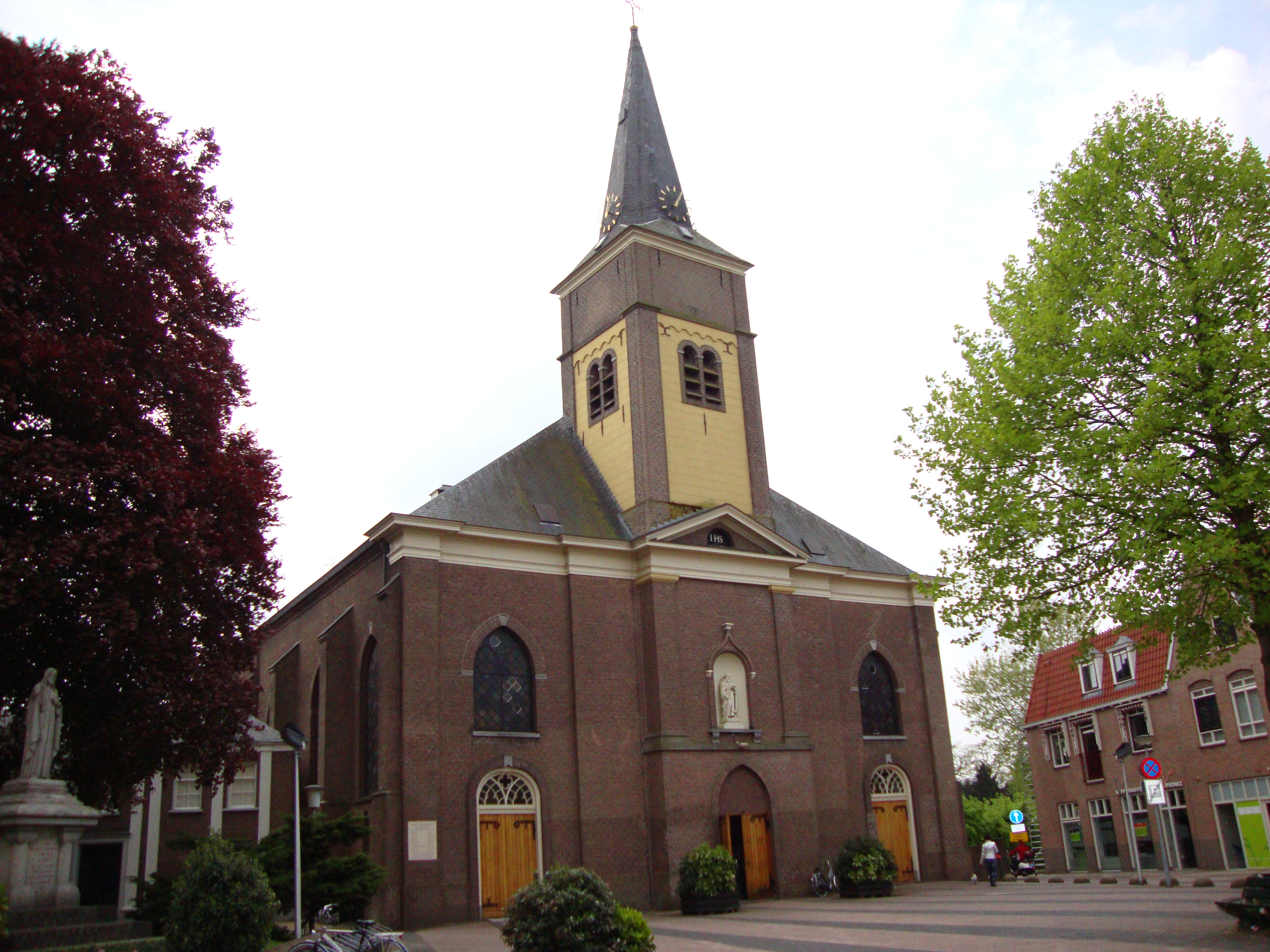
Wijchen, catholic church

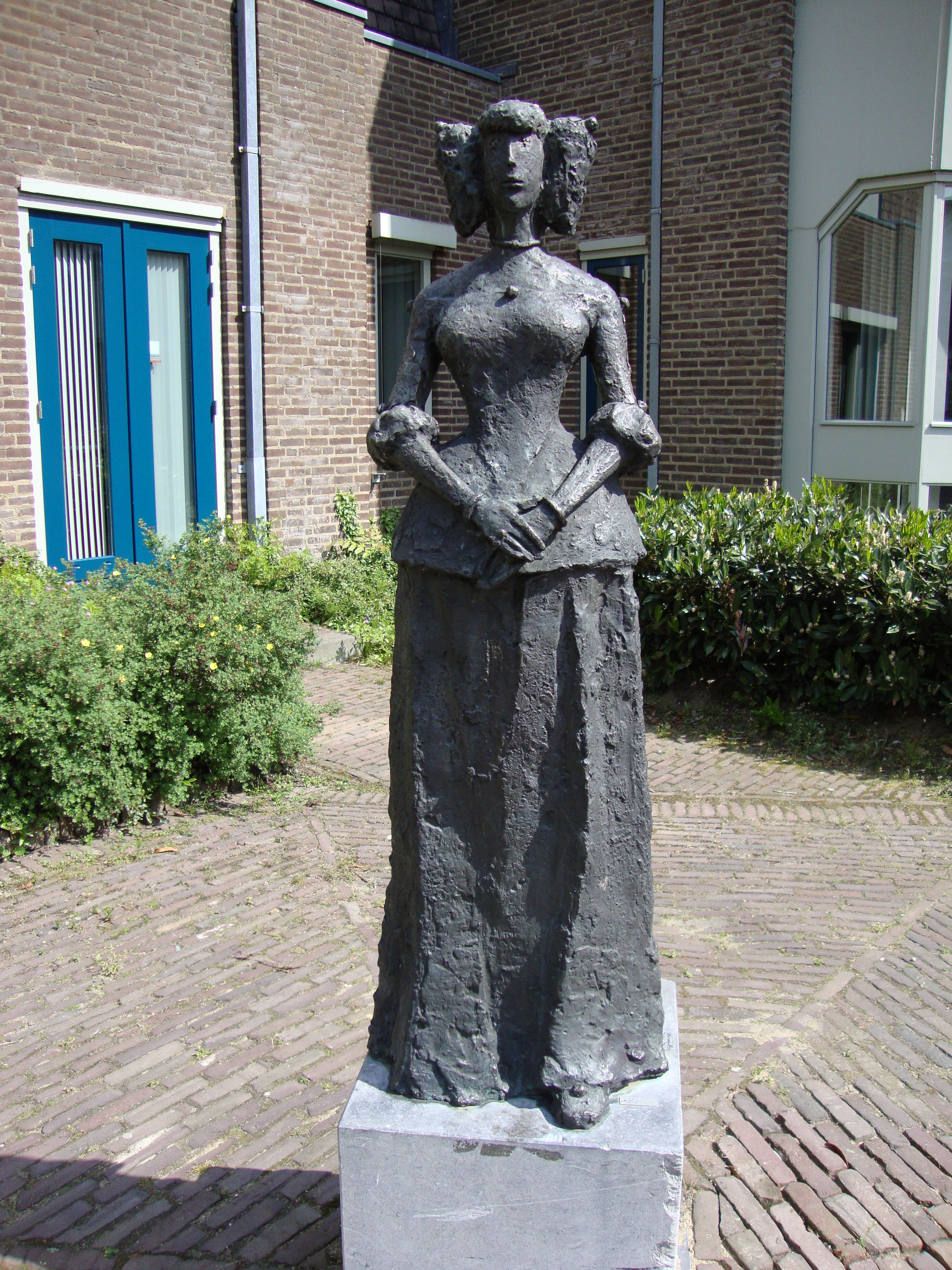
Wijchen, Statue: Emilia van Nassau

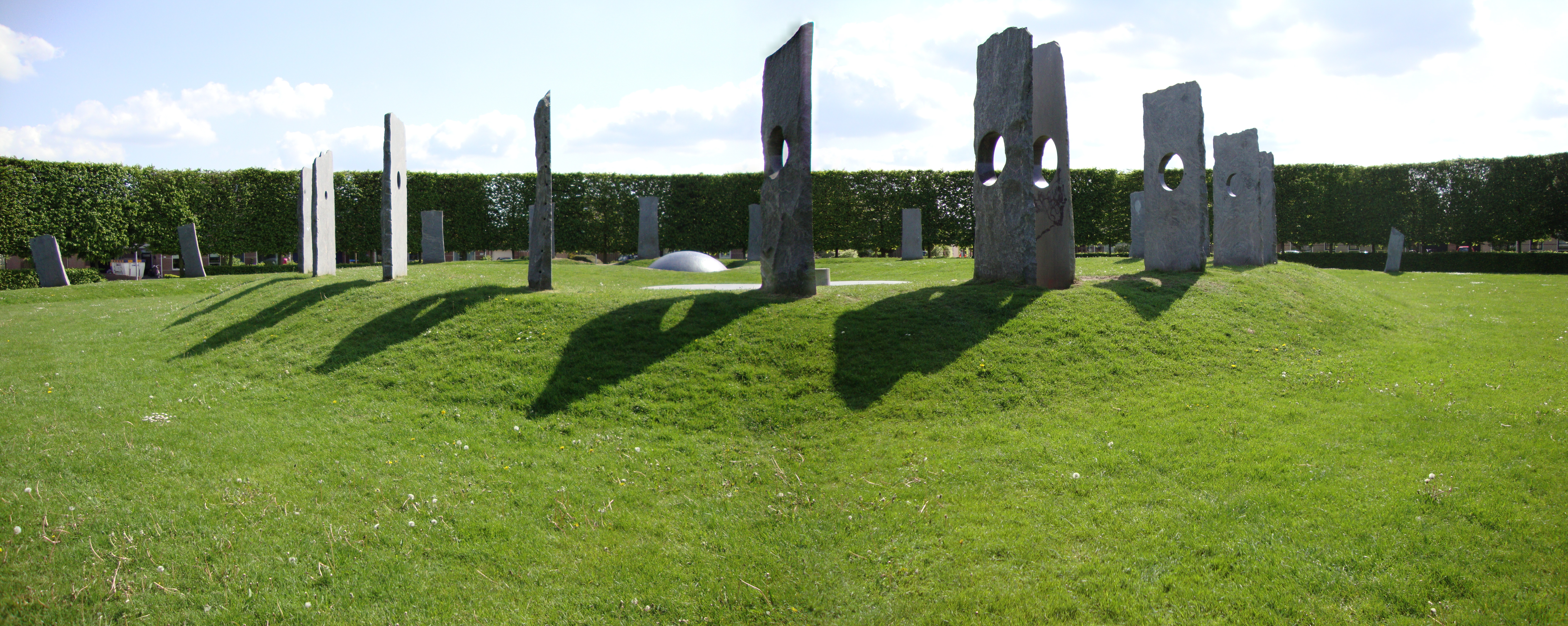
Wijchen, sculpture: Zonneveld

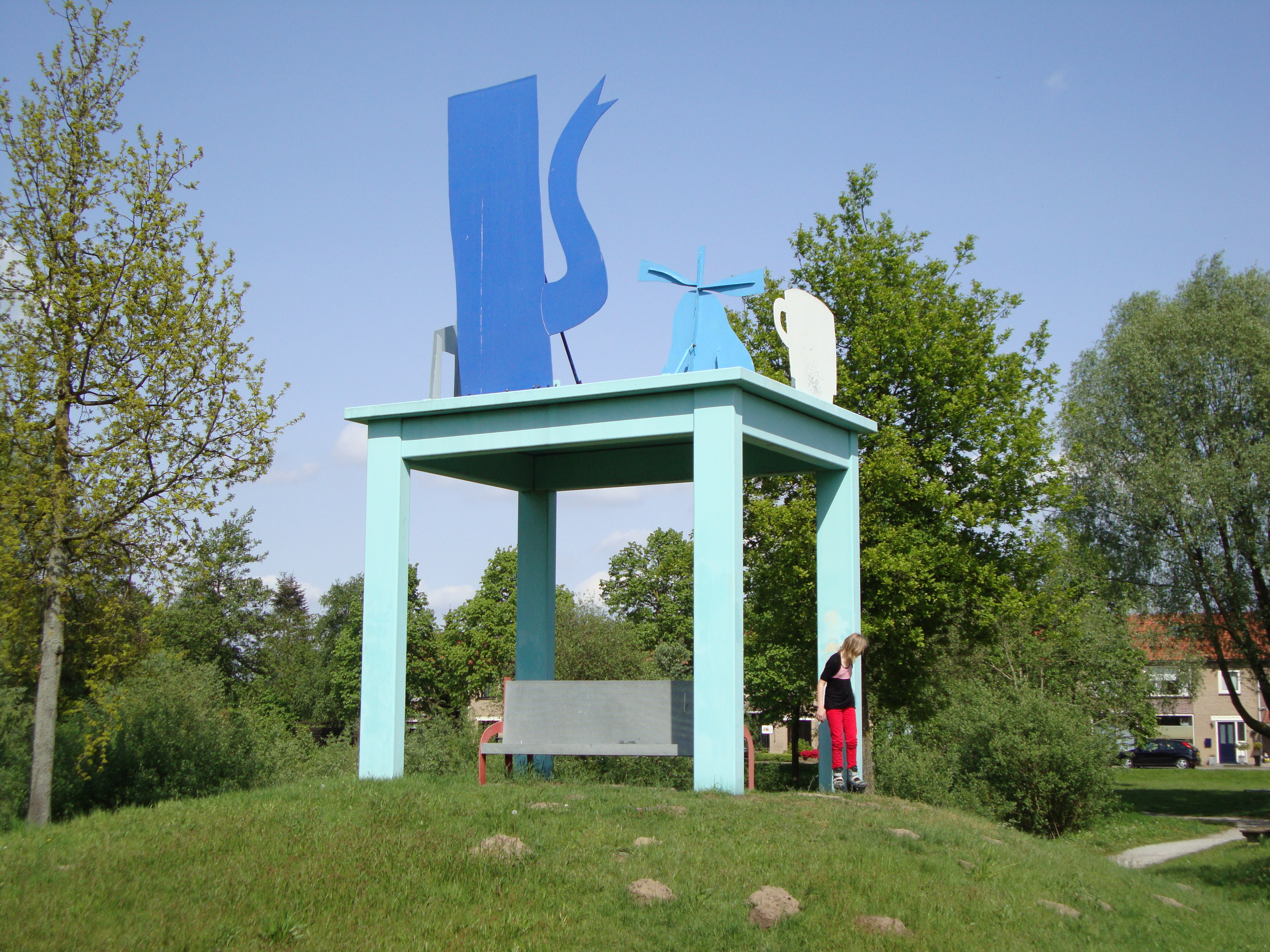
Wijchen, sculpture: De Tafel

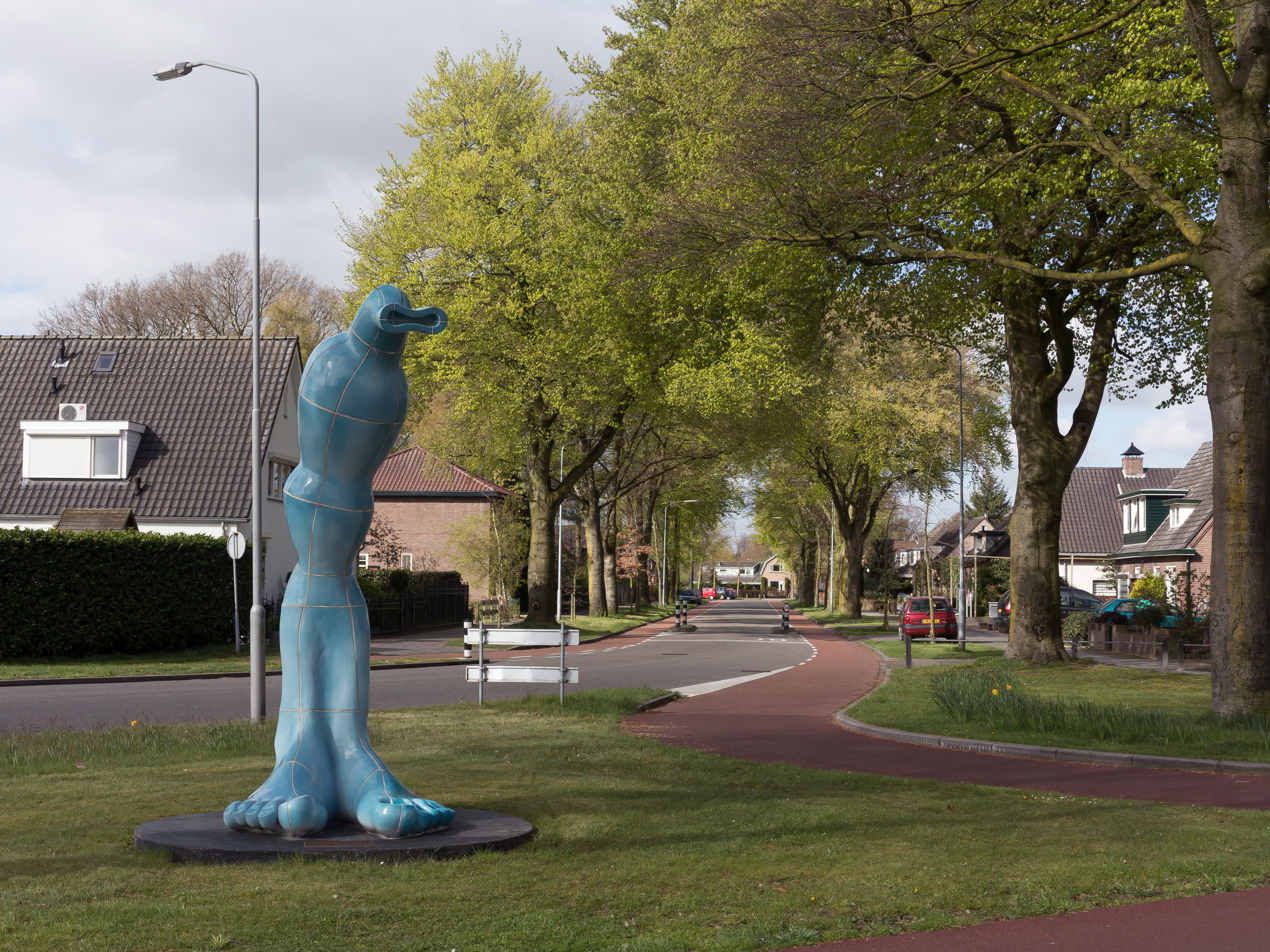
Wijchen, ceramic: The foot wants to go where you already find the eye

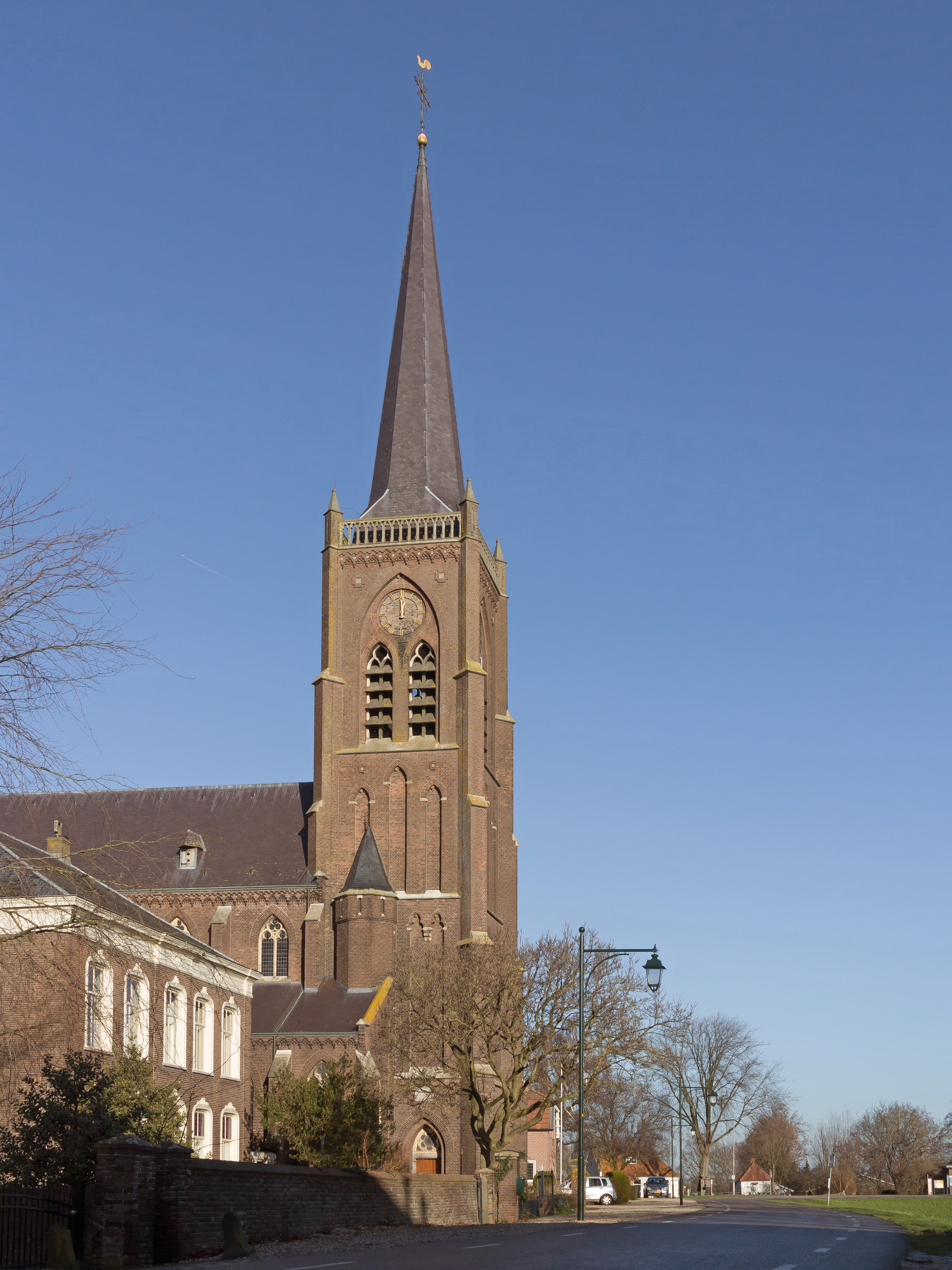
Batenburg, church: the Sint Victorkerk

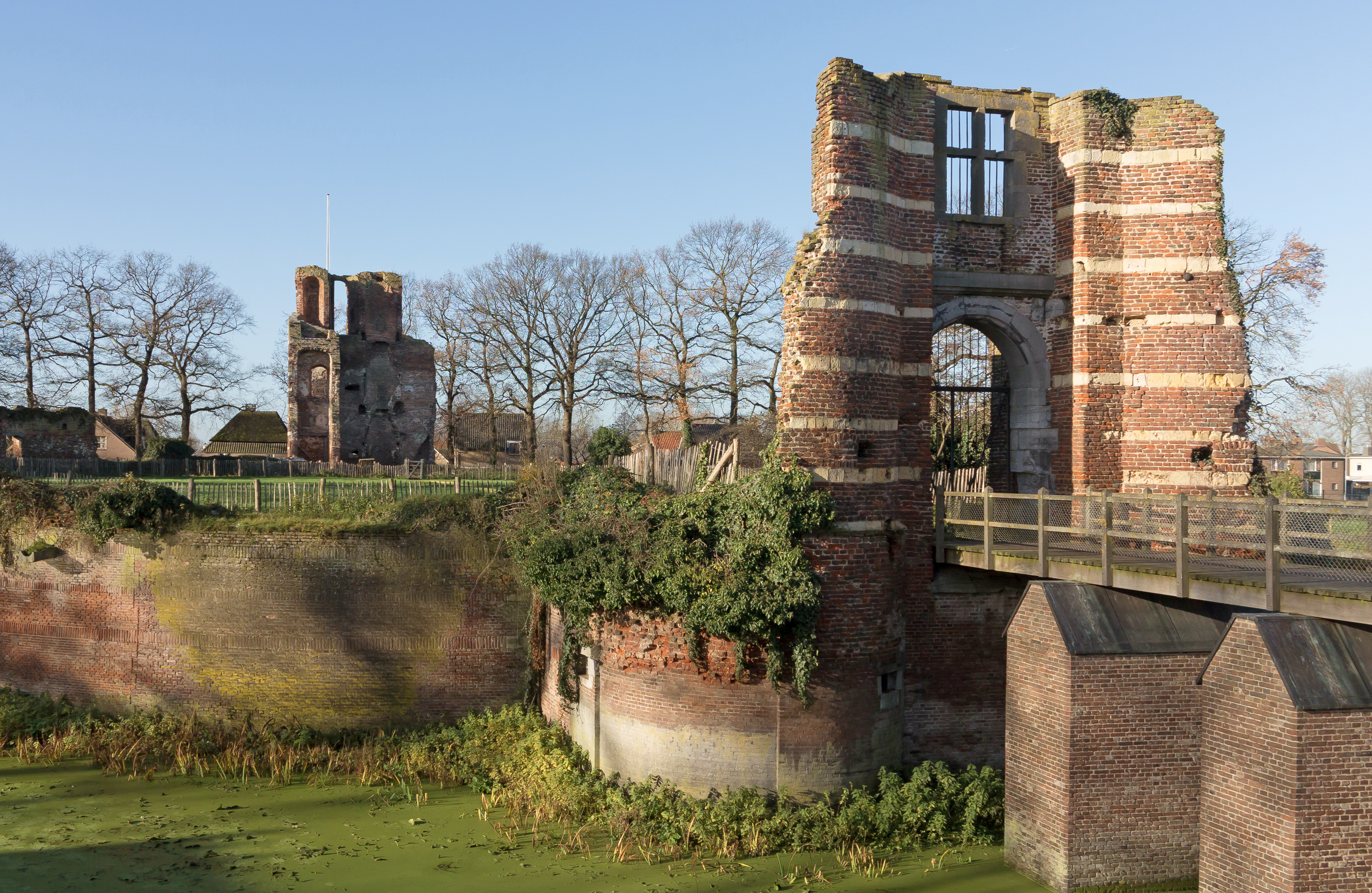
Batenburg, ruins

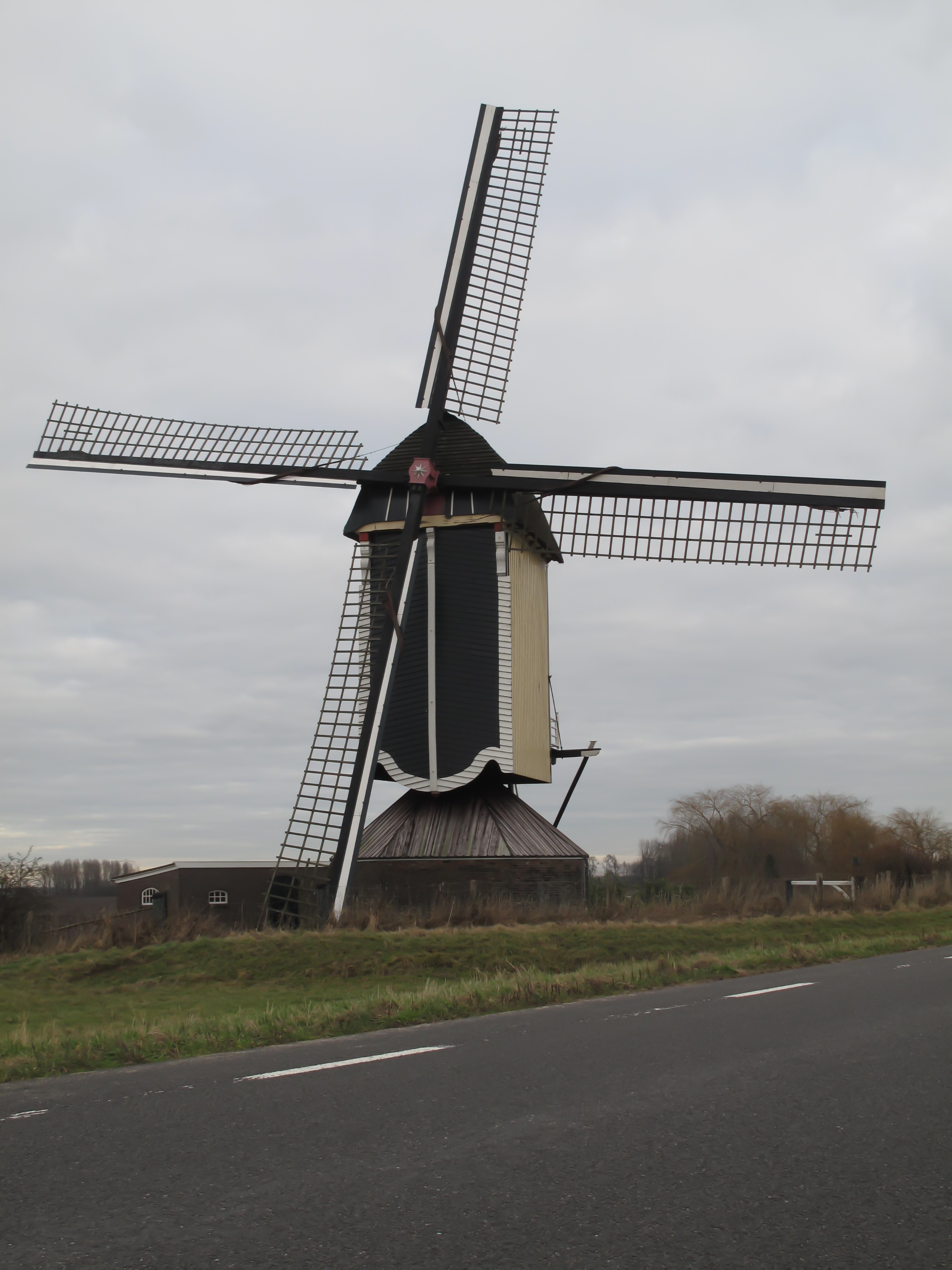
Batenburg, windmill

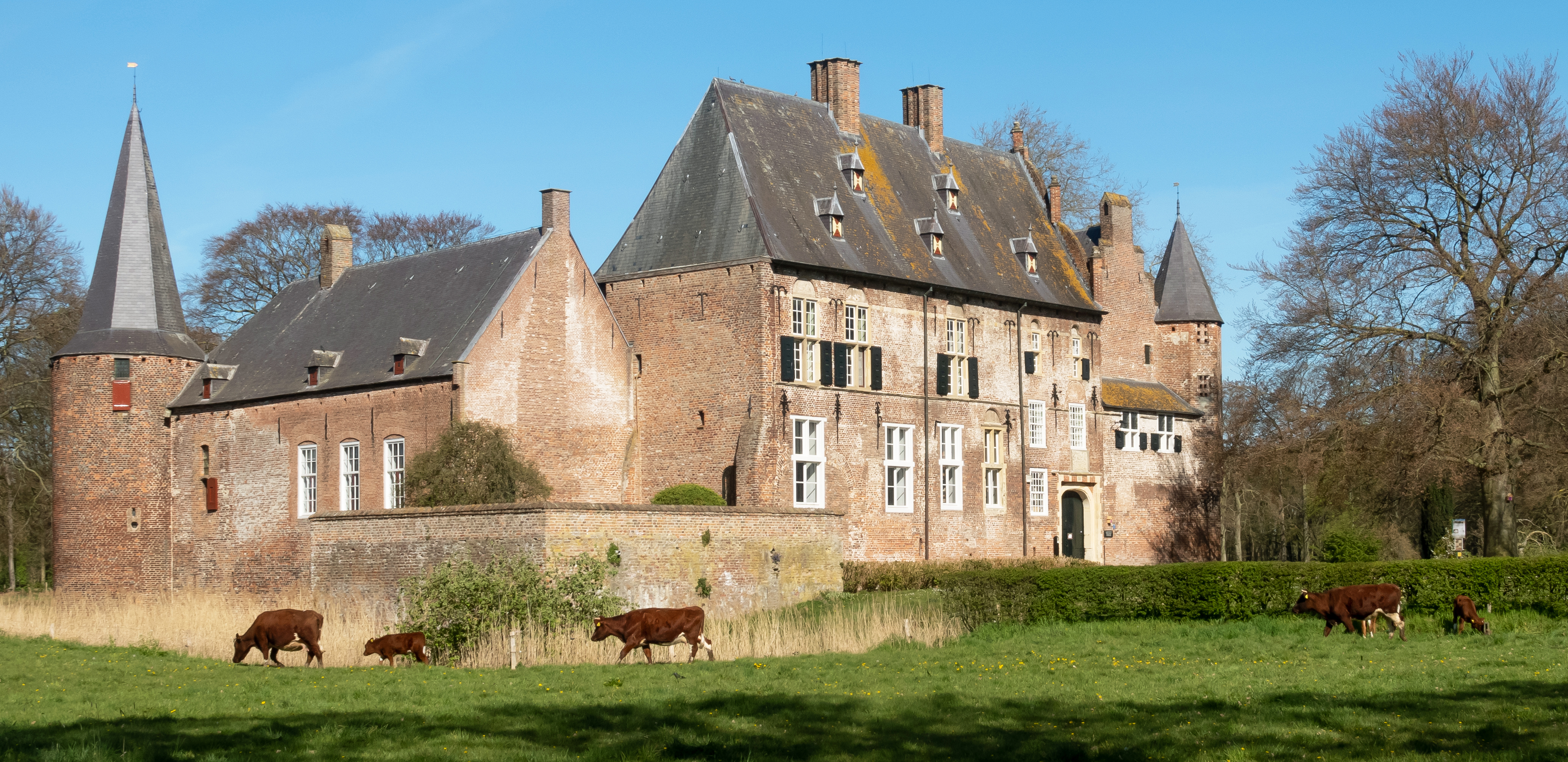
Hernen, castle: kasteel Hernen

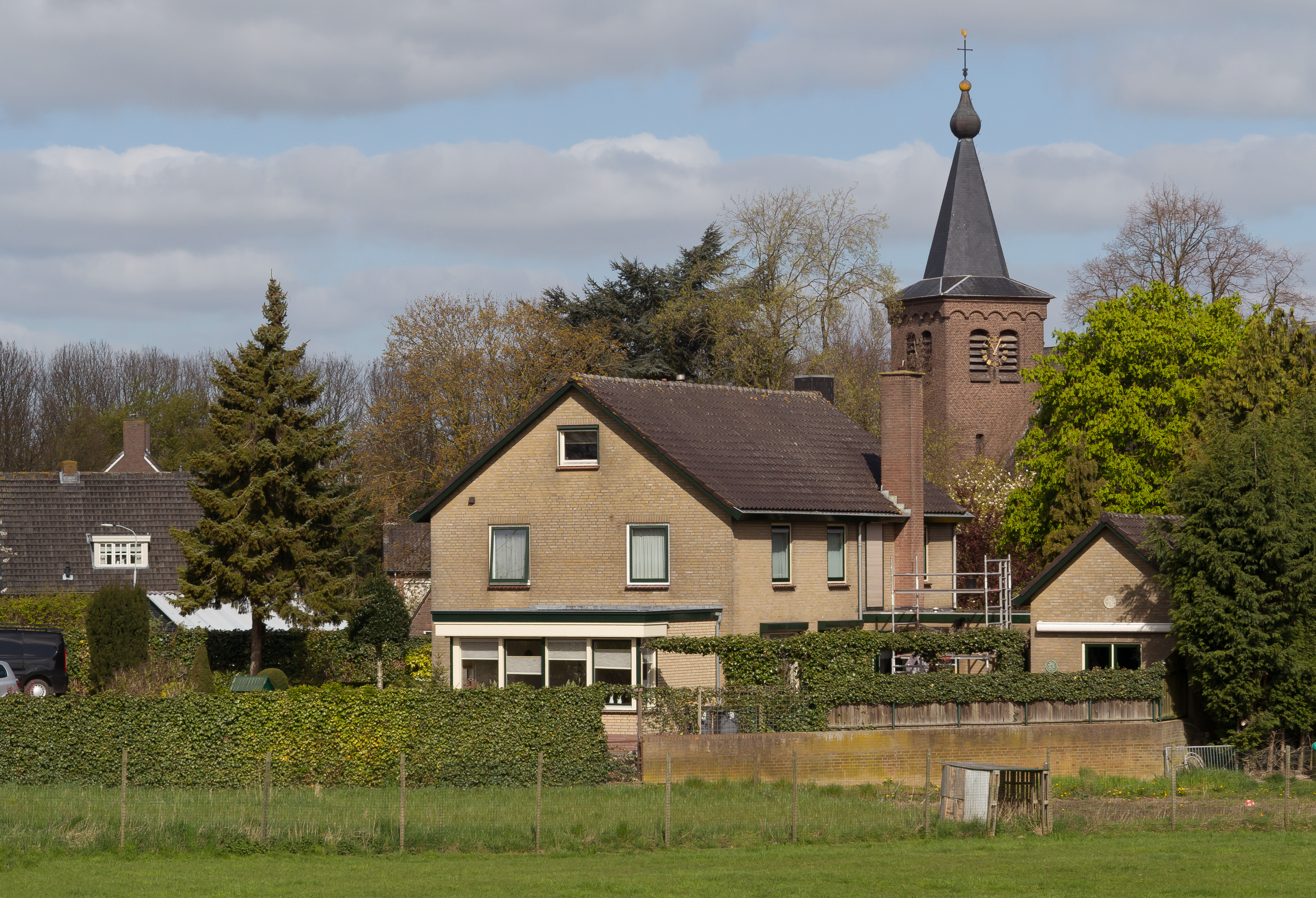
Niftrik, churchtower in the village
