= Batenburg Windmill =

Dutch windmill

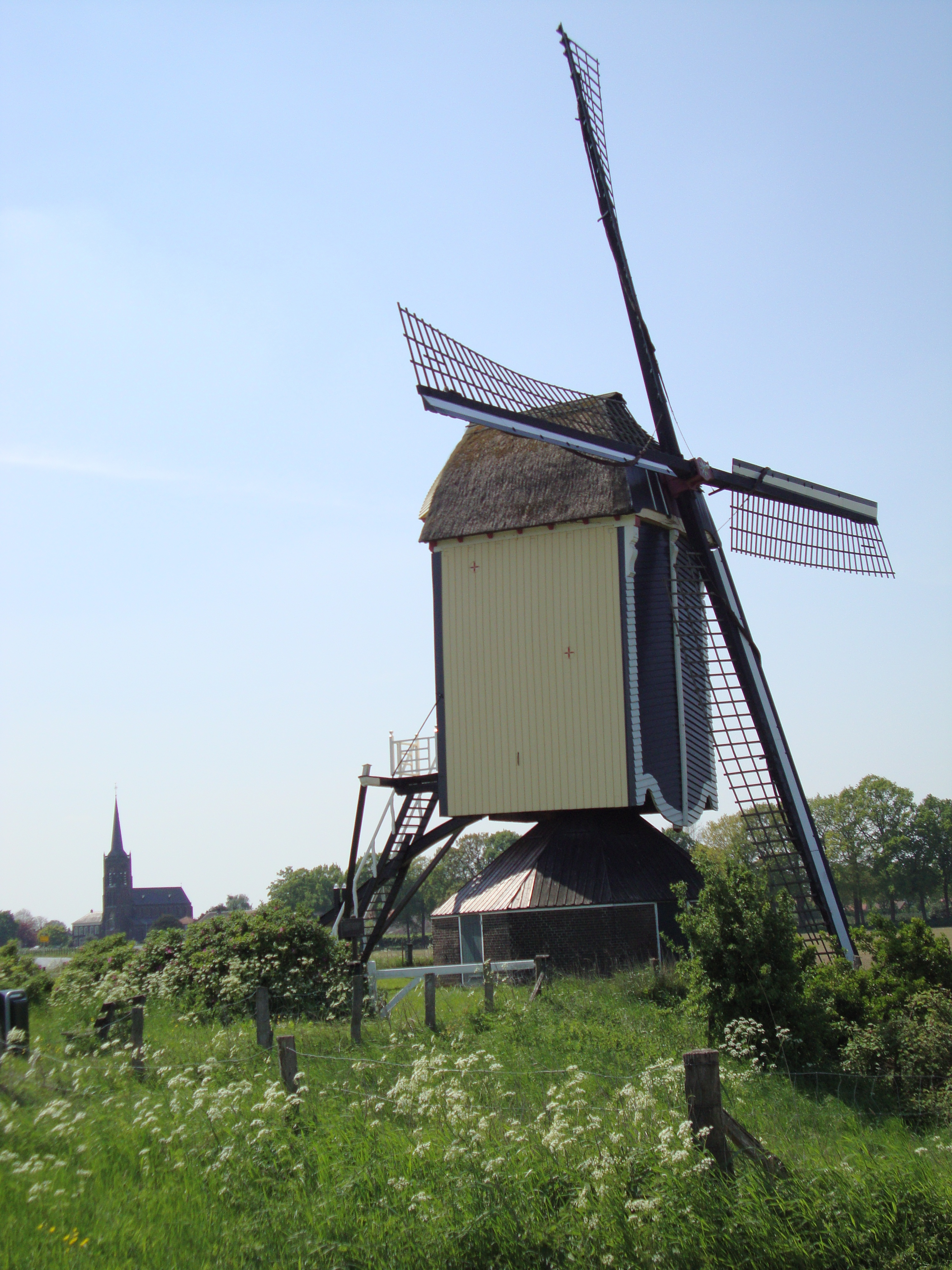
- The mill in May 2010

Origin
- Mill name: Batenburg Windmill
- Mill location: Molendijk 15, 6634 KE, Batenburg
- Coordinates: 51°49′29″N 5°38′19″E
- Operator(s): Vereniging De Hollandsche Molen
- Year built: 18th century

Information
- Purpose: Corn mill
- Type: Post mill
- Roundhouse storeys: One storey roundhouse
- No. of sails: Four sails
- Type of sails: Common sails
- Windshaft: Wood
- Winding: Tailpole and winch
- No. of pairs of millstones: Two pairs
- Size of millstones: 1.60 metres (5 ft 3 in) diameter

Batenburg Windmill is a post mill in Batenburg, Gelderland, Netherlands which was built in the 18th century and is under repair as of February 2014. The mill is listed as a Rijksmonument.

== History ==
The first mill on this site was built in 1531. It belonged to the Batenburg Castle. It was compulsory for the local farmers to take their grain to the mill to be ground. The mill was built in the 18th century. Batenburg Castle was burnt down by the French in 1795 during the War of the First Coalition and the records of the mill were lost.

Major repairs were carried out in 1913. Owned by Viktor Adolf, Prince of Benheim-Steinfurth when World War II took place, the castle and its estate were seized by the Dutch Government following the German surrender at the end of World War II in Europe. Ownership was transferred to the Stichting Vrienden Gelderse Kasteelen in 1953. The mill was sold in 1957 to its former tenant, H. Th. Verploegen, who restored the mill in 1960. The mill was sold to Mhr. Van der Steen in 1970, and was transferred on 18 April 1973 to the Vereniging De Hollandsche Molen. Further restorations took place in 1977 and 1996. In 2011, the mill was stopped due to a crack in the wooden windshaft. The windshaft was removed in February 2014 pending a decision on repair or replacement. The mill is listed as a Rijksmonument, № 8719.

== Description ==
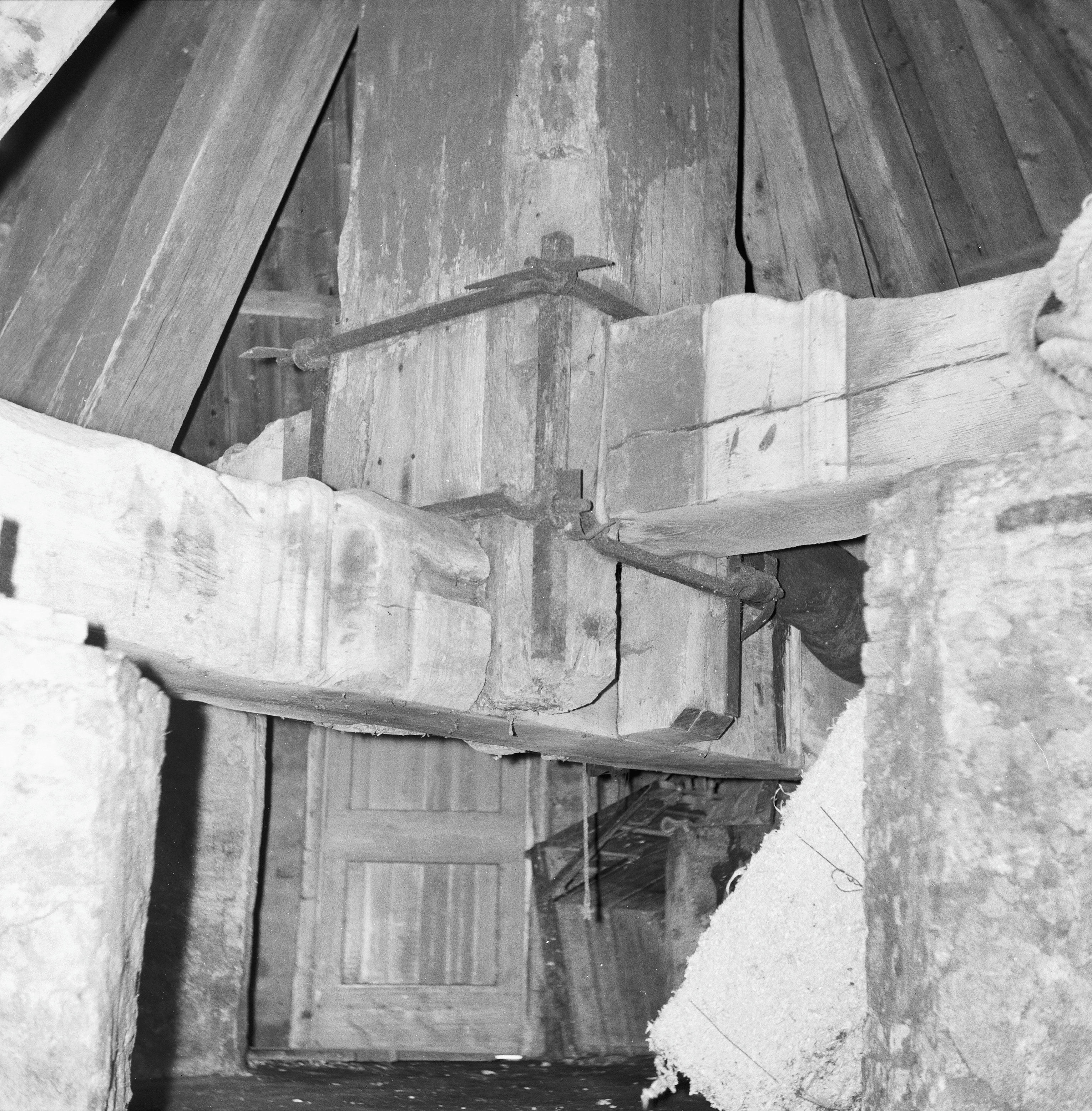
The mill's trestle, September 1961.

The mill is what the Dutch describe as a "Standerdmolen". It is a post mill with a single storey octagonal roundhouse. The roof of the buck is thatched. The mill is winded by a tailpole and winch. The sails are Common sails. One pair has a span of 25.55 metres (83 ft 10 in), and the other pair spans 25.40 metres (83 ft 4 in). The sails are carried on a wooden windshaft. The windshaft also carries the head wheel which has 68 teeth and the tail wheel which has 67 teeth. These gears each drive a pair of 1.60 metres (5 ft 3 in) diameter French Burr millstones via lantern pinion stone nuts, which have 13 staves each.

== Public access ==
The mill is open on Wednesdays 13:30-17:00, or by appointment.
