= Batenburg Castle =

Castle in Gelderland, Netherlands

Coordinates: 51°49′26″N 5°37′52″E

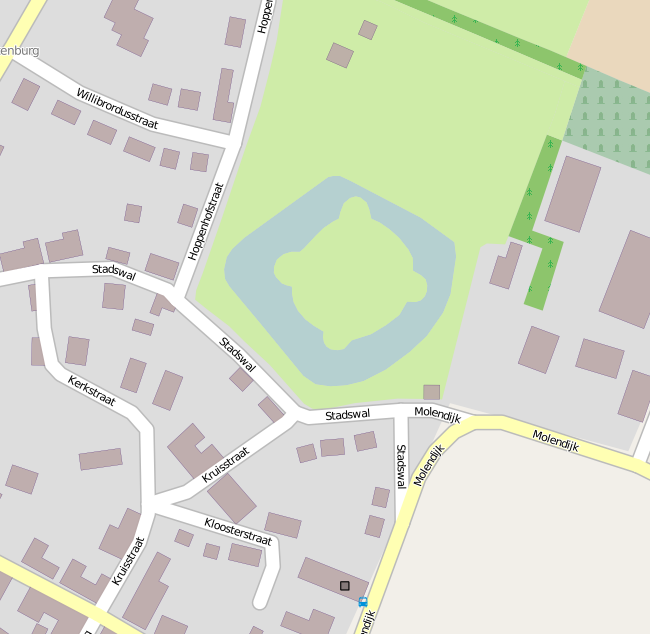
Map showing the location of the castle within the surrounding village

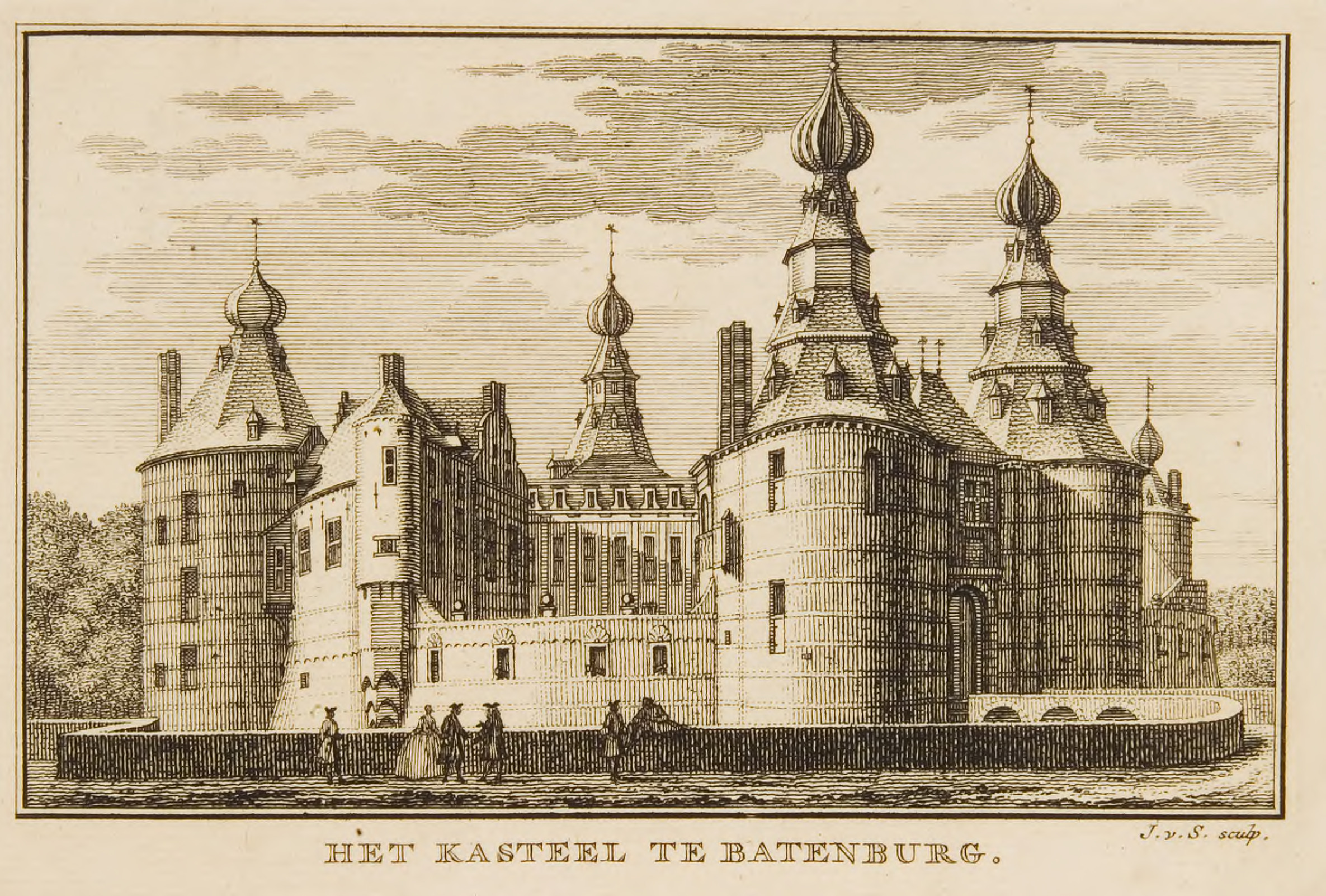
Batenburg Castle in its heyday

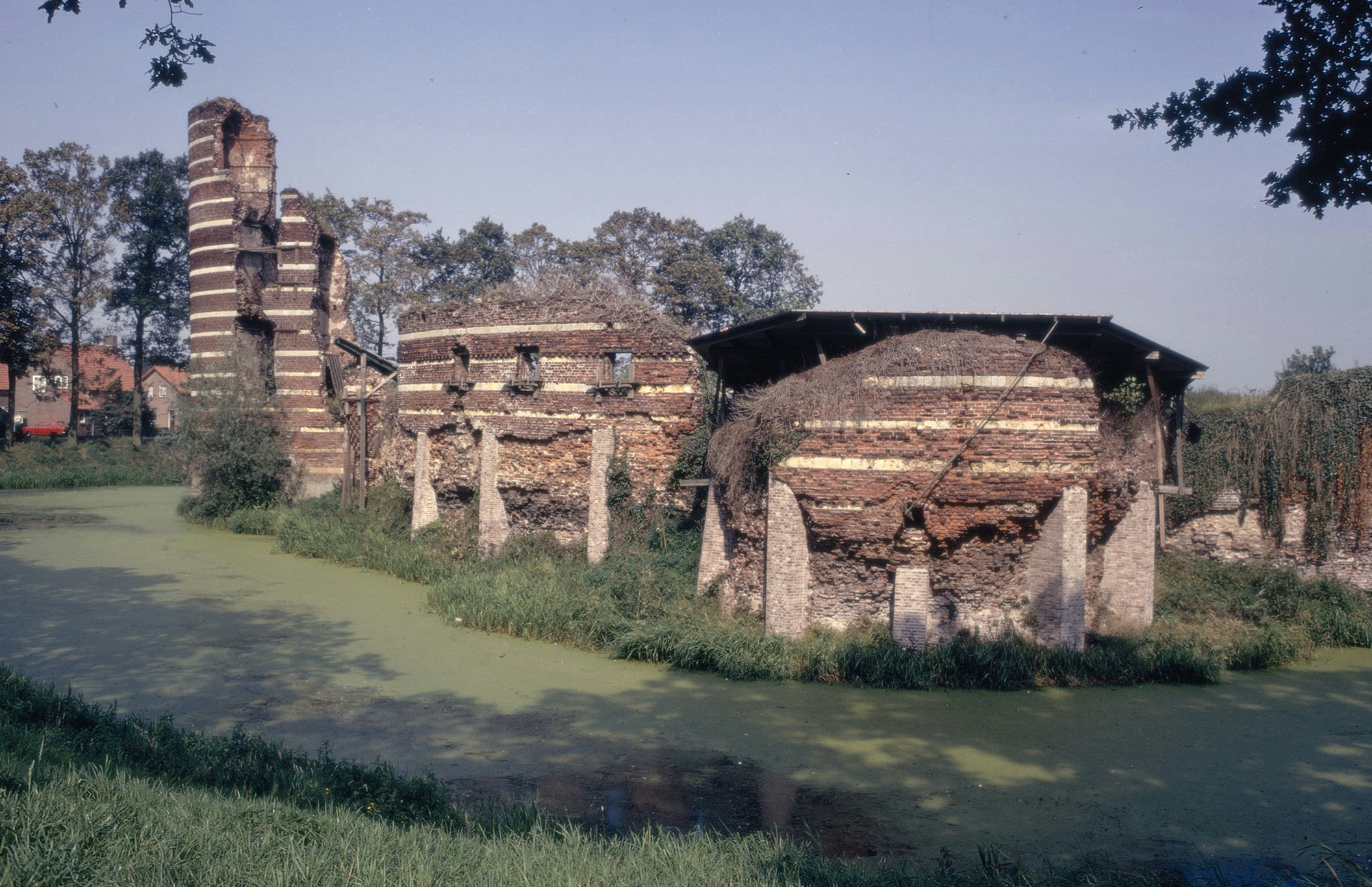
Colour view of the ruins in 1975

Batenburg Castle (Dutch: Kasteel Batenburg) is located in the village of Batenburg, in the Gelderland province in the Netherlands. It is thought that the castle began construction in 1300. The castle is located on the northern edge of the village. It is surrounded by a moat.

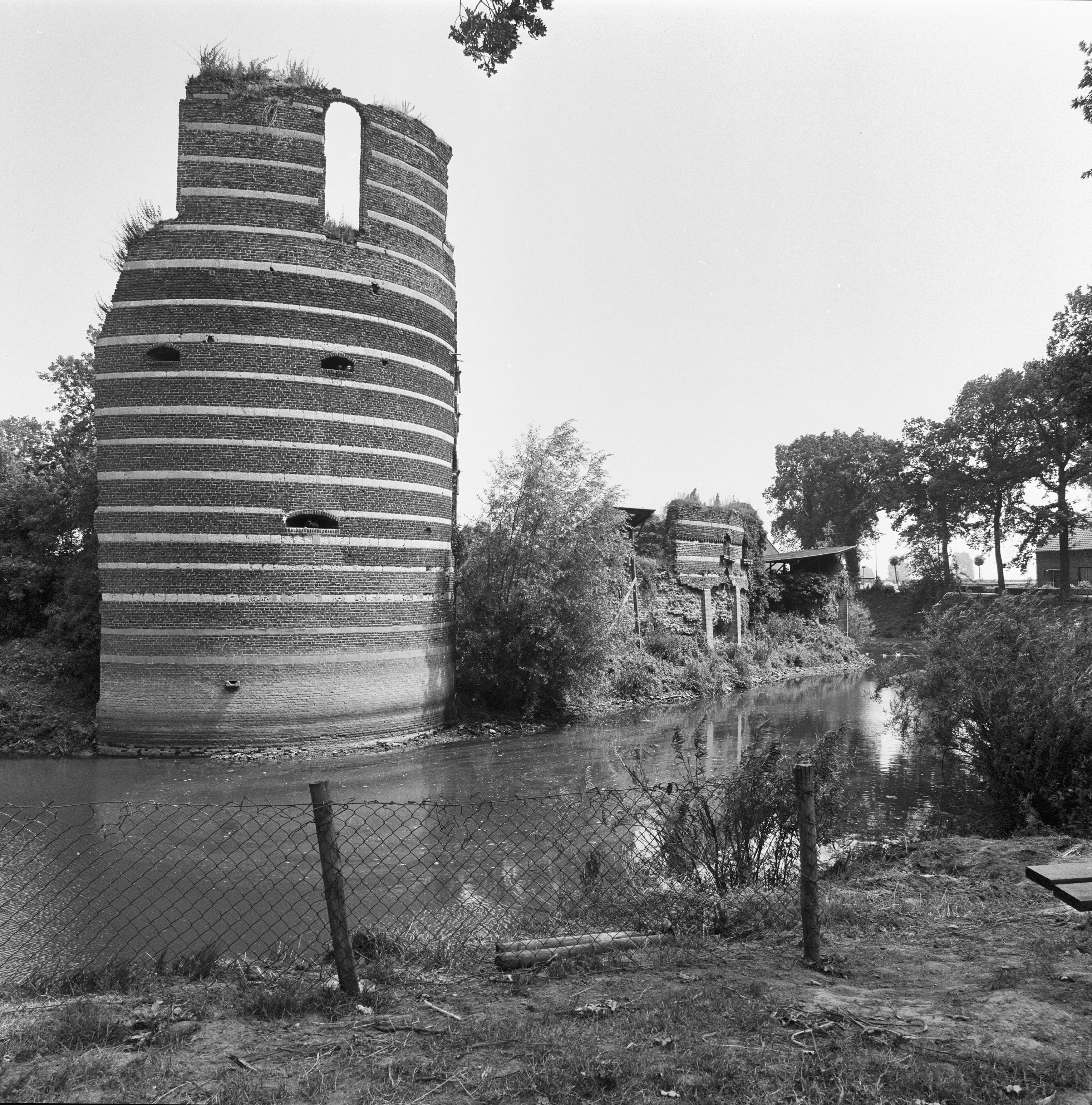
Exterior ruins of the castle, seen in 1989.

The castle was rebuilt in 1600 on the foundations of an earlier structure; The present castle was destroyed by fire in 1795 and is now preserved as ruins: the ring wall with towers, the remains of three extended round towers with a basement underneath and the remains of the gatehouse. These are flanked by semicircular towers, all built with limestone brick. Batenburg Windmill was formerly owned by the castle.

The site is recognized as a Rijksmonument under number 8725.

== See also ==
- List of castles in the Netherlands
