= Angerlo =

- Village
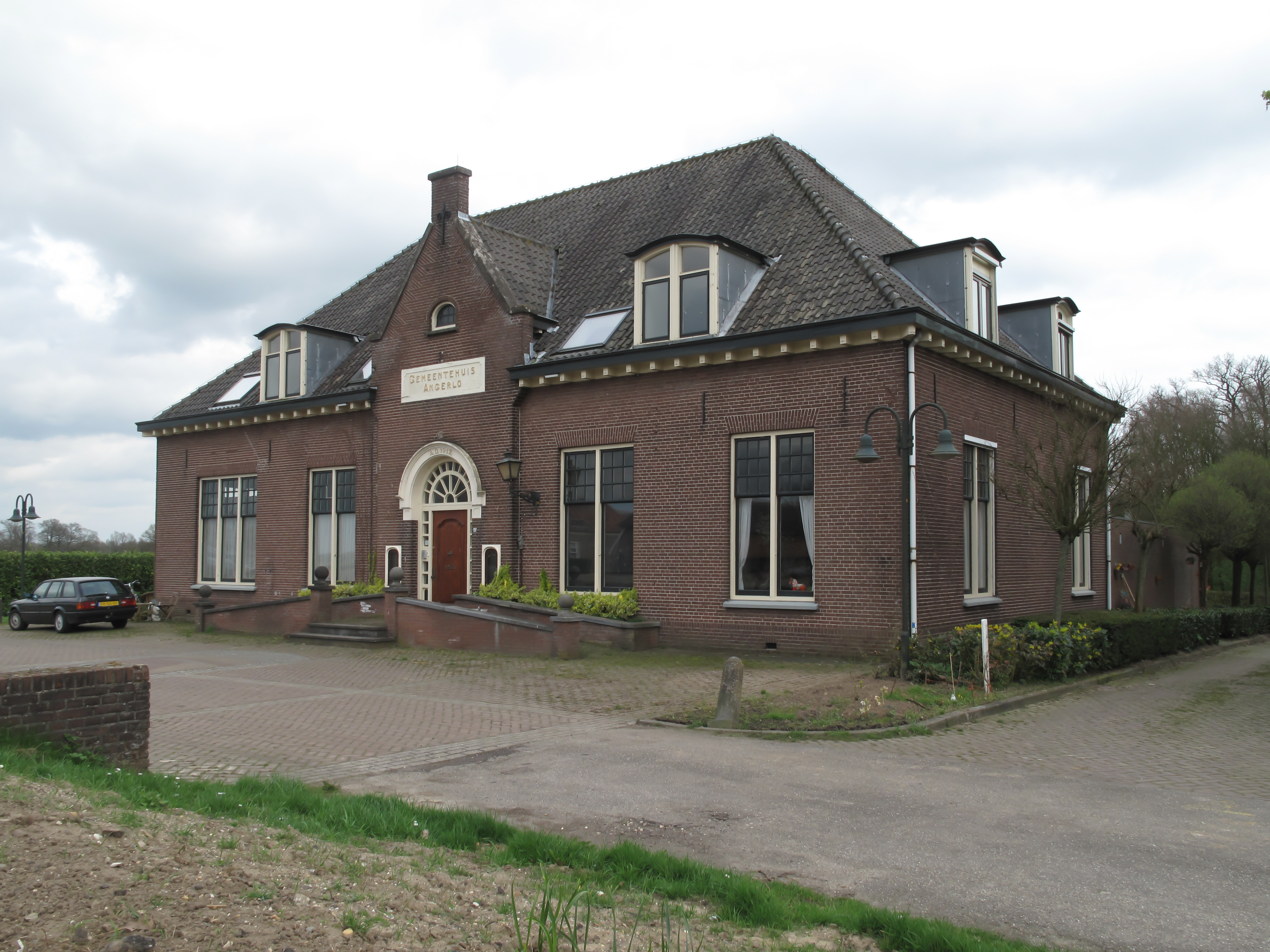
- Former town hall

- Flag Coat of arms

- Location in the Netherlands Angerlo (Netherlands)
- Coordinates: 51.9956°N 6.1358°E
- Country: Netherlands
- Province: Gelderland
- Municipality: Zevenaar

Area
  - Total: 18.30 km^{2} (7.07 sq mi)
- Elevation: 11 m (36 ft)

Population (2021)
  - Total: 1,455
  - Density: 79.51/km^{2} (205.9/sq mi)
- Time zone: UTC+1 (CET)
  - Summer (DST): UTC+2 (CEST)
- Postal code: 6986
- Dialing code: 0313

Angerlo is a village in the municipality of Zevenaar, in the eastern Netherlands. It is located about 2 km south of Doesburg.

Until 1 January 2005, Angerlo was an independent municipality, with a population of about 5,000. This municipality included the villages of Bahr, Giesbeek and Lathum, and the hamlets of Bevermeer and Bingerden.

== History ==
The village was first mentioned in 1025 as Angarlo, and means "forest near grassland". Angerlo developed as a linear settlement on a river dune. Parts of the Dutch Reformed Church date from the 11th century. The western tower was replaced between 1766 and 1767, and was destroyed in 1945. It was rebuilt between 1948 and 1950. Huis Bingerden is a havezate which was first mentioned in 970. It was extensively modified in 1786, and burnt down in 1945. It was rebuilt in a slightly different form. In 1840, it was home to 325 people.

== Gallery ==
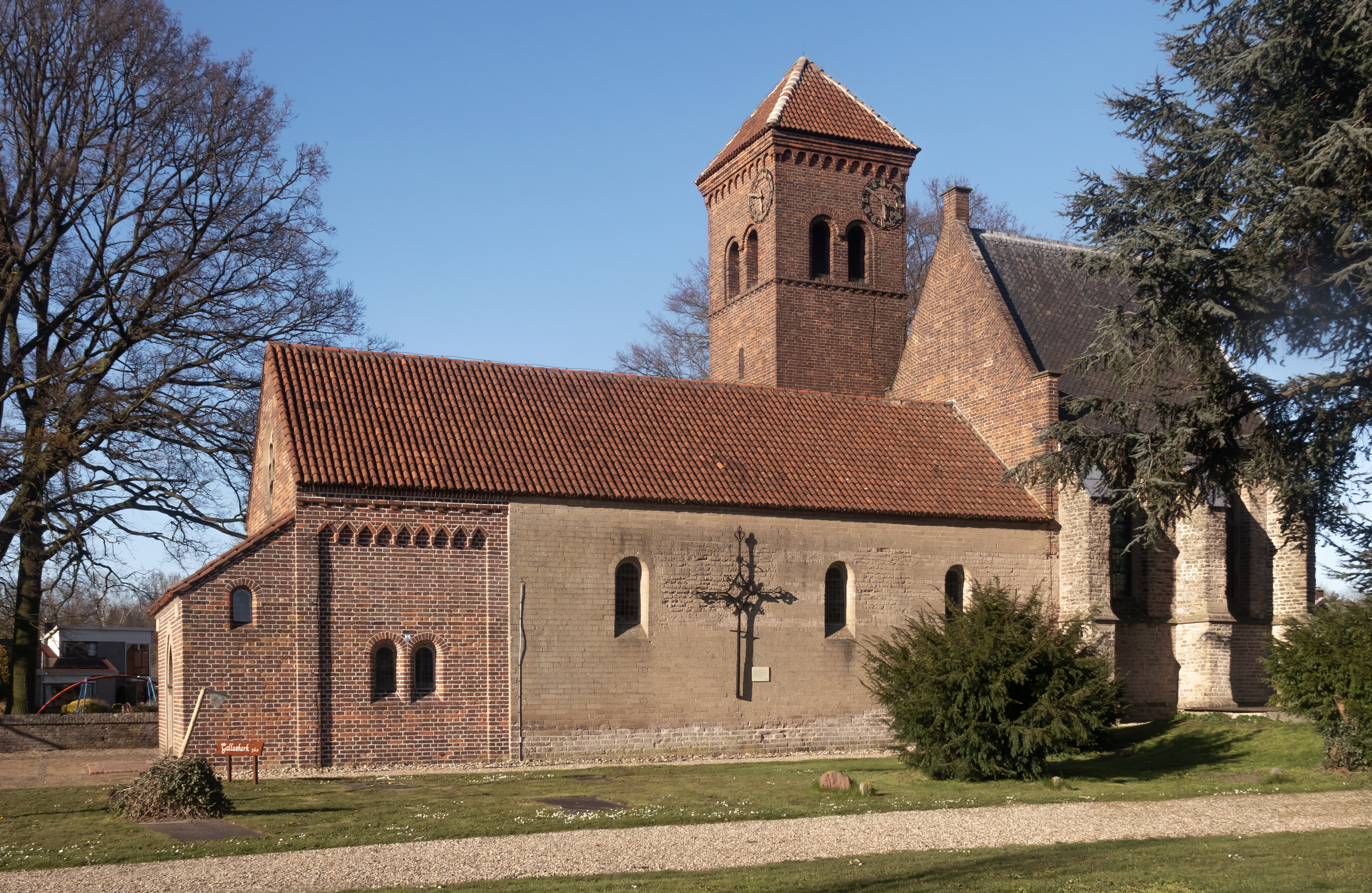
Angerlo, church

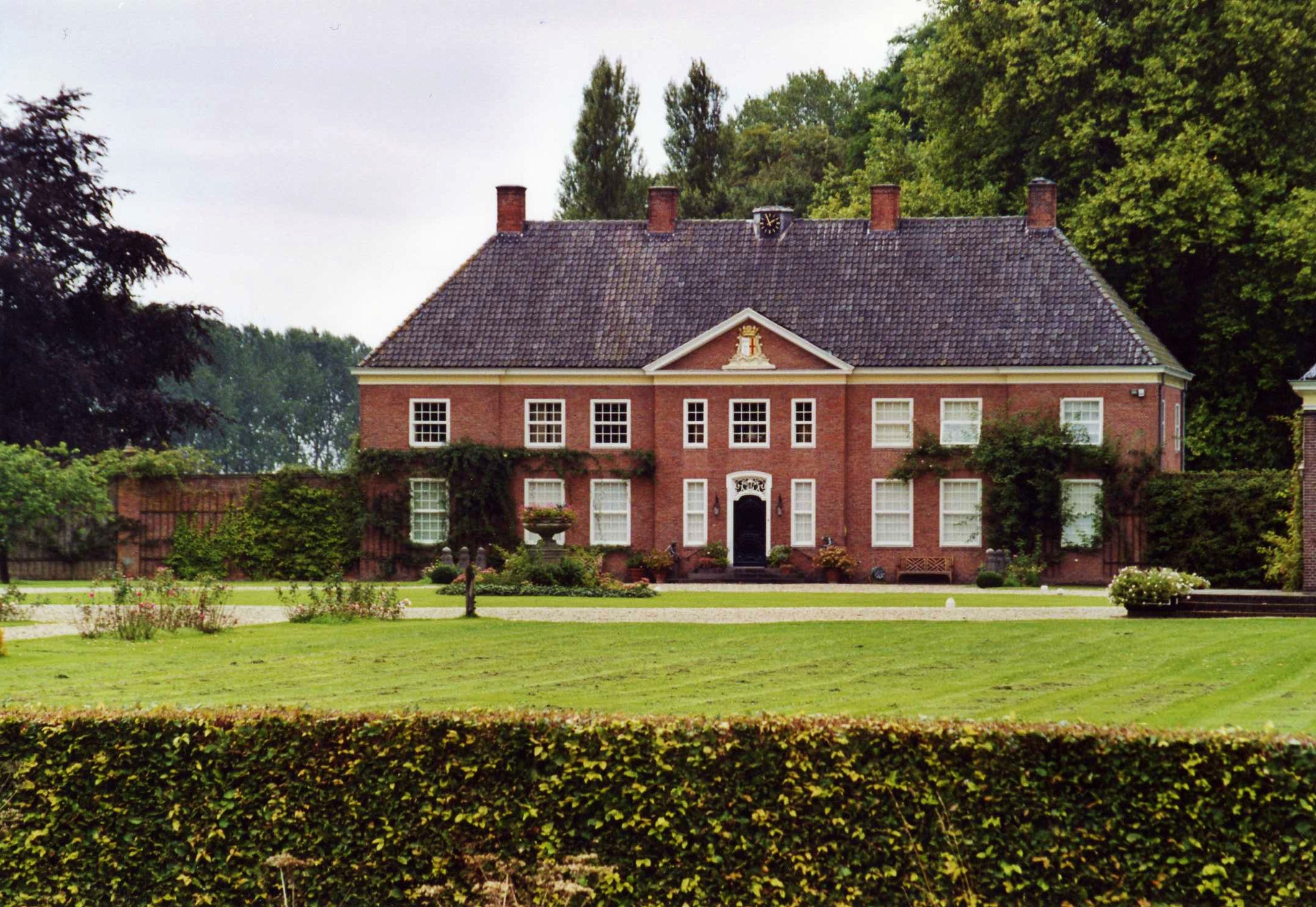
Huis Bingerden

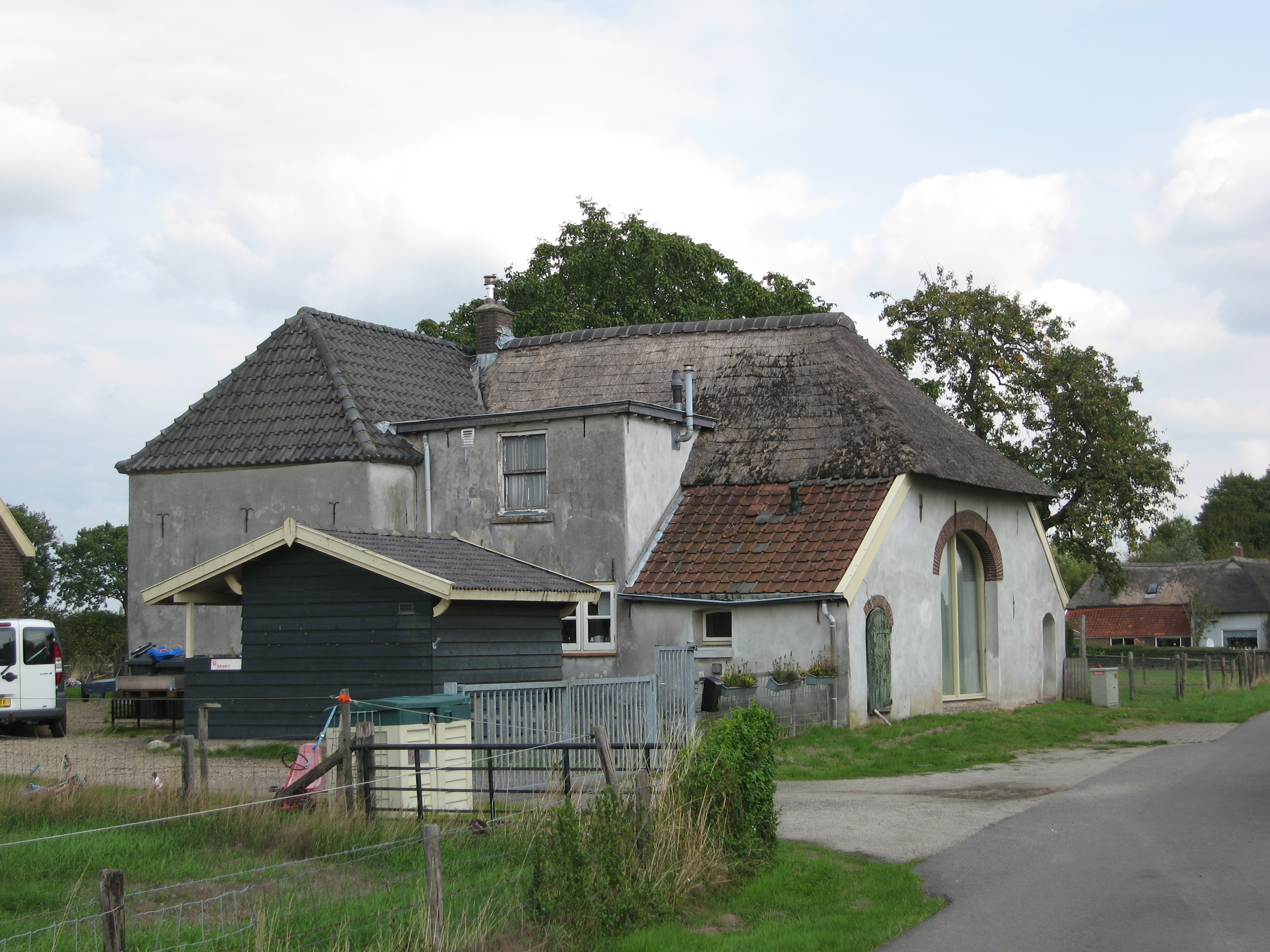
Farm in Angerlo

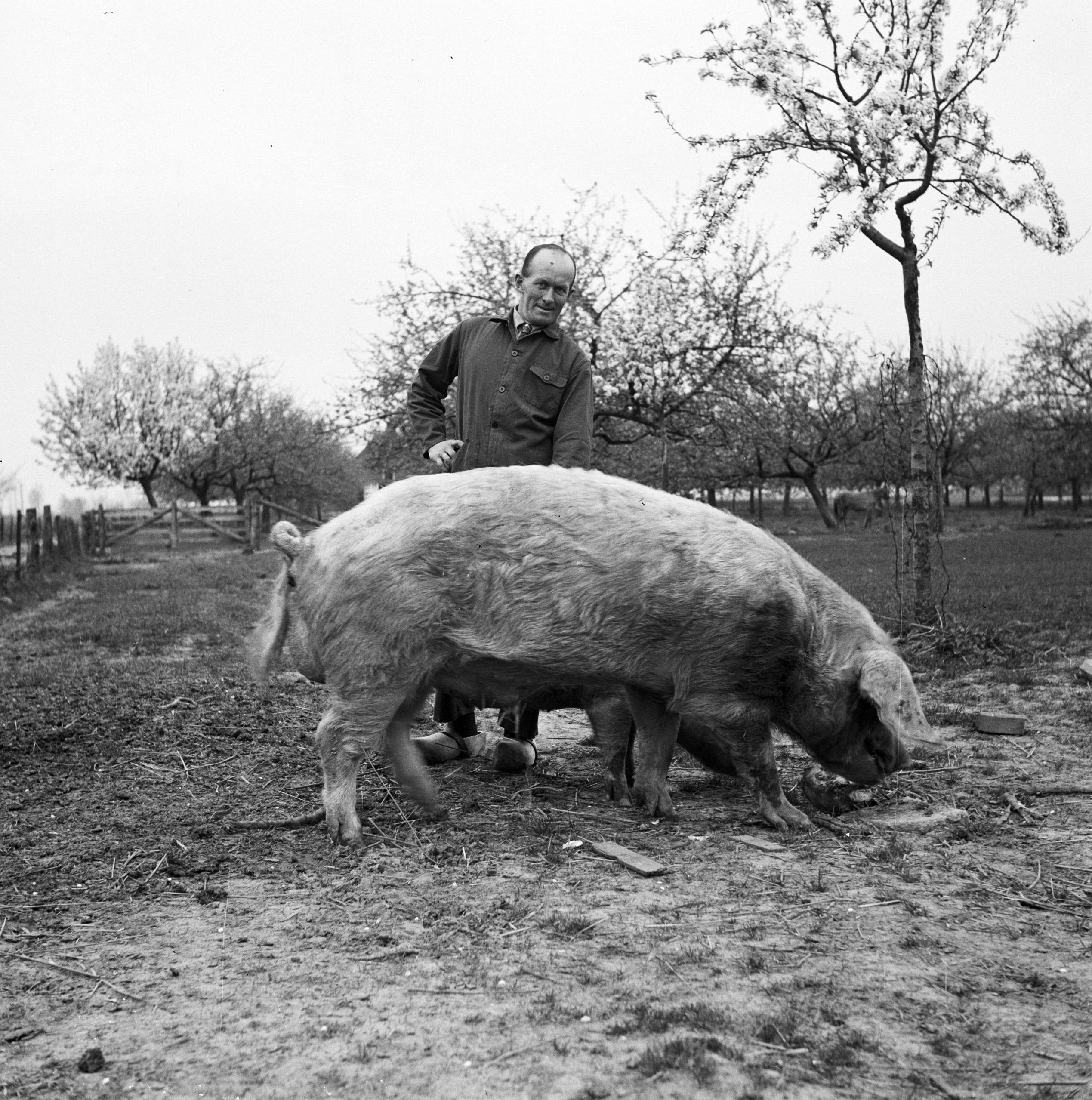
Pig and farmer (1932)
