= Turmac =

Tobacco brand

Turmac (Turkish Macedonian Tobacco Company) was a tobacco brand that operated in the Dutch town of Zevenaar between 1920 and 2008. The company ceased its operations in 2008.

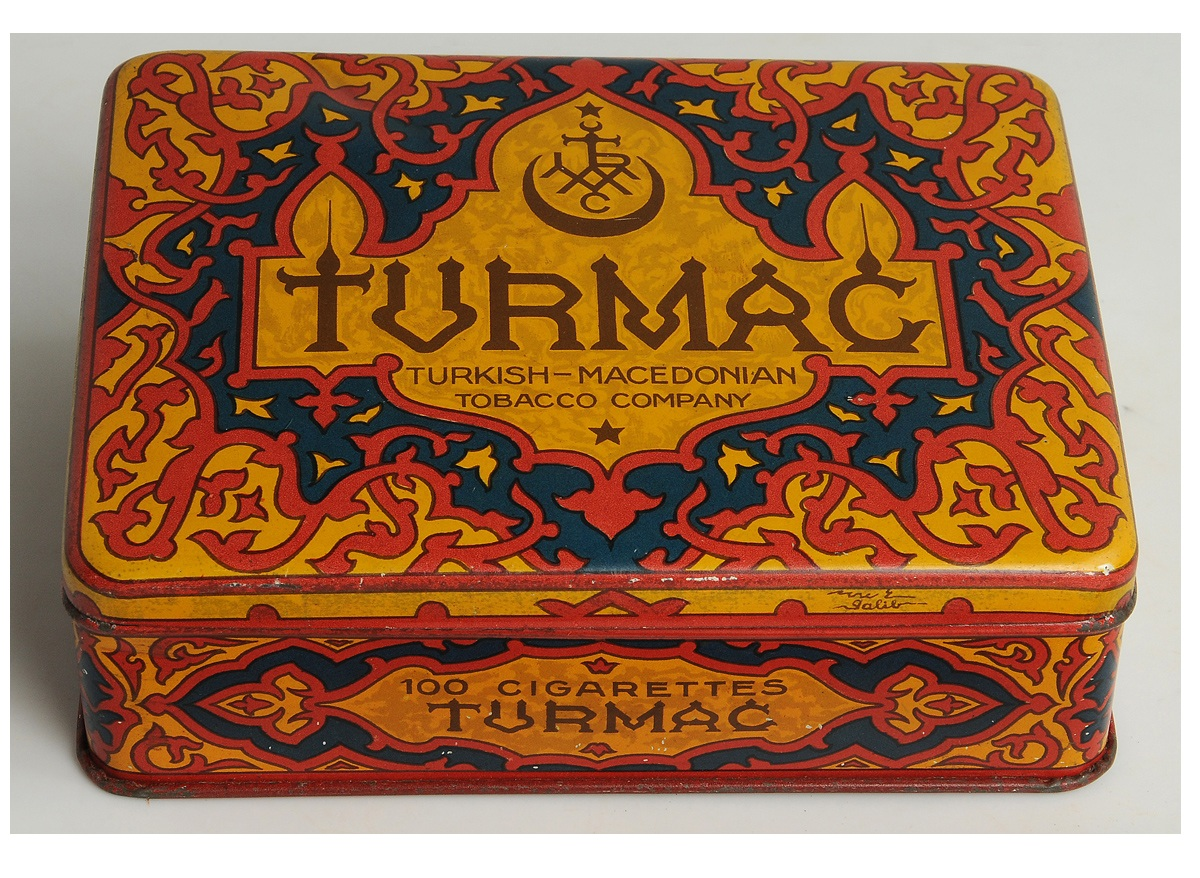
A box of Turmac cigarettes.

Aparto Turmac cigarettes.

Rugby Turmac cigarettes.

Turmac park in Vondelstraat, named after the Turmac company that used to bet there

Prince Bernhard visiting the Turmac factory, dated May 1966.

== History ==
Around 1920, Willem Carel Buschhammer and Kapanci Donmeh businessman Kazem Emin Bey started a new tobacco factory in Zevenaar. They imported tobacco from Turkey and Macedonia, and the abbreviation of these origins became the factory's name: Turmac. Both the initial tobacco barn and the later concrete main building and warehouses were designed in the 1910s and 1920s by the Zevenaar-based architect H.A. Rutten. Turmac placed great emphasis on packaging and advertising, featuring distinctive Oriental-style cigarette boxes (some of which can still be viewed at the Deventer Historical Museum) and booklets depicting flags from around the world.

The Second World War was a difficult time for Turmac. The factory was bombed three times. During a September 1944 attack a stray rocket landed on the Turmac building, which resulted in two deaths and one seriously injured. On February 6 and March 23, 1945, the factory was bombed again which resulted in the production building completely reduced to rubble. A director was also murdered after whom a street in Zevenaar is named.”

After the war, "Old Mac" became a popular Turmac brand (with the advertising slogan: "Always in the mood for an Old Mac"). In 1952, a new building was constructed, designed by architects W.S. van de Erve and Marten Zwaagstra. A rather unusual solution was chosen regarding the lighting; it was believed that artificial light would be superior to daylight, as it was thought to reduce absenteeism and accidents. Consequently, the Directorate-General of Labour granted an exemption to equip the factory with "approximately 2,000 40-watt fluorescent tubes, positioned to avoid glare." In 2007, Minister Plasterk designated the building as a landmark post-war monument, including it in the "Top 100 Dutch Monuments (1940–1958)." It was announced in 2013 that the factory would not be granted national monument status.

=== Manor houses ===
In 1941, Turmac purchased the adjacent manor house, Swanepol. It was demolished in the late 1940s to make way for factory expansions. The Mathena manor house was acquired in 1974; its gardens were used for the construction of new buildings, while the house itself was initially rented out as a residential care facility. From 1981 to 2010, it housed the Liemers Museum. The building was subsequently sold.

=== Decline and closure ===
Turmac's sales declined during the 1950s, and the last Turmac cigarettes rolled off the production line in 1960. The factory shifted to manufacturing under license for other producers serving the European market—initially for Rothmans International , and later for the British American Tobacco Manufacturing Company (BAT). The factory closed in 2008.

== Town Hall and Turmac Cultural Factory ==
In September 2013, the Zevenaar municipal council announced that the new town hall would be housed in the former cigarette factory.

Production hall HAL 12 accommodates facilities including the library, Museum Liemers – Kunstwerk!, Grand Café HAL 12, and the Zevenaar film house (featuring two auditoriums). The De Liemers and Doesburg Regional Archives also maintains an archival facility in this building, which was named the Turmac Cultural Factory in 2020.

In 2019, all other buildings—with the exception of Building 15 and Building 24—were demolished to make way for housing construction.
