= Veldhuizen, Gelderland =

Veldhuizen
- Hamlet
- Location in the province of Gelderland in the Netherlands Veldhuizen (Netherlands)
- Coordinates: 51°54′18″N 6°9′5″E
- Country: Netherlands
- Province: Gelderland
- Municipality: Zevenaar

Veldhuizen is a hamlet in the Dutch province of Gelderland. It is located in the municipality of Zevenaar, on the border with Germany, about 7 km southeast of the town of Zevenaar.

It was first mentioned between 1851 and 1855 as Veldhuizen, and means "(temporary) settlement in the field". A part of the hamlet is located in Germany where it's called Feldhausen. The Dutch part consists of about 15 houses.
