= Van Baer (family) =

Coats of arms of Baer

The Van Baer family, also known as Van Baer van Lathum or Van Bahr Van Lathum, was a Middle Age noble family from Bahr and Lathum, in the Dutch province of Gelderland.

There was a Kasteel Baer (Castle Baer) in the 13th century.

Coat of arms of Baer, as depicted in Gelre Armorial, with crest representing a puppy head.
