= De Buitenmolen, Zevenaar =

Tower mill in Zevenaar, Netherlands

De Buitenmolen
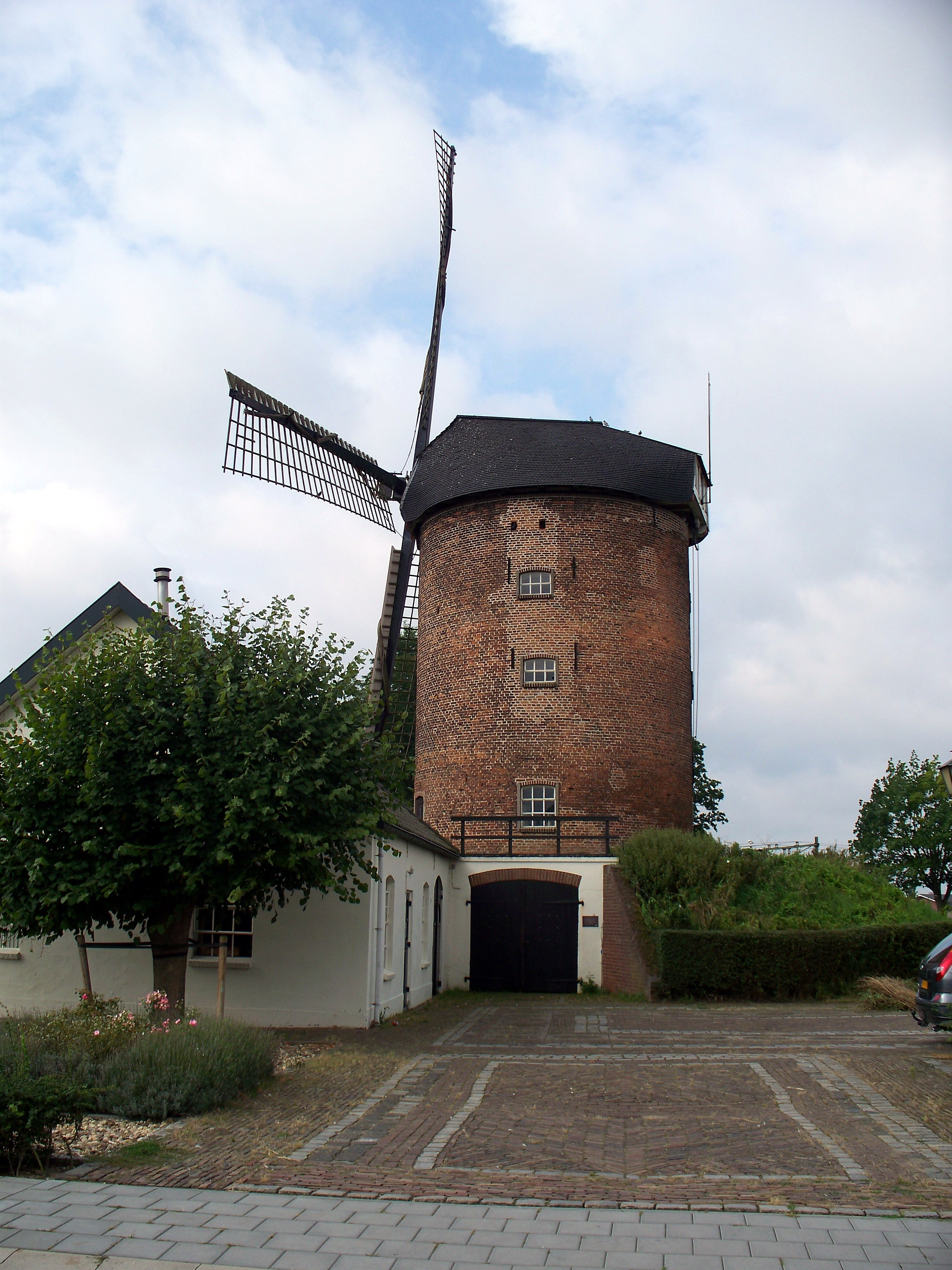
- De Buitenmolen, 2008
- Interactive map of De Buitenmolen

Origin
- Mill name: De Buitenmolen
- Mill location: Molenstraat 63 6901 CC Zevenaar
- Coordinates: 51.925411°N 6.065470°E
- Operator: municipally Zevenaar
- Year built: start of 16th century

Information
- Purpose: Corn mill
- Type: Tower mill
- No. of sails: Four sails
- Type of sails: Common sails
- Windshaft: Wood
- Winding: Internal winding with medieval winding gears
- No. of pairs of millstones: One pair
- Size of millstones: 140 centimetres (4.6 ft) diameter
- Other information: Uses a mound instead of stage to set the sails. One of the oldest windmills of the Netherlands.

The Buitenmolen (Outer mill) is a tower mill in Zevenaar, Netherlands that was restored to working order in 1970. The mill was built in the beginning of the sixteenth century and is listed as a Rijksmonument, number 40427.

== History ==
The first mention of a windmill on this site dates from 1408; however, this probably refers to an older post mill, which was later replaced by the current brick tower mill. Research on the brickwork of European tower mills by a historian points to a year of construction that cannot be earlier than about 1500. The mill was initially the property of Lord of the Duchy Kleef and continued to be owned by successive landlords, until it was sold into private ownership in 1866 to the then leaseholder Van Grinten. After his death, it was sold to mill worker Johannes Gerritsen. In the 1930s, the change was made from wind to motor power, and the sails, tailpole and internal gearings were removed. All milling stopped in 1955, after which the municipally of Zevenaar became the owner in 1966. They had the windmill restored in 1969.

== Description ==
The Buitenmolen is a brick tower mill with a 3.28 metres (10 ft 9 in) high mound built up around the mill for the miller to reach the sails. The four common sails have a span of 24.4 metres (80 ft 1 in). They are carried on a wooden windshaft, 9 metres (29 ft 6 in) in length which was initially fitted in 1969 and replaced in 2002. The windshaft carries the brake wheel which drives the wallower at the top of the upright shaft. At the bottom of the upright shaft, the great spur wheel drives the one pair of mill stones of 1.50 metres (4 ft 11 in) diameter via a lantern pinion stone nut. The mill is winded by two sets of wooden gears in the cap engaging cogs on the curb. The gearing is operated by an endless rope running on a Y-wheel on the dust floor but can also be operated by an endless chain from outside the mill or powered by an electric motor. The cap rests on a live curb with flanged cast iron rollers and is covered by wood shingles.

== Public Access ==
The windmill is open to the public every Saturday from 10:00 to 16:00 and by appointment.
