= H. L. M. van Nispen van Sevenaer =

Dutch politician and nobleman (1879–1958)

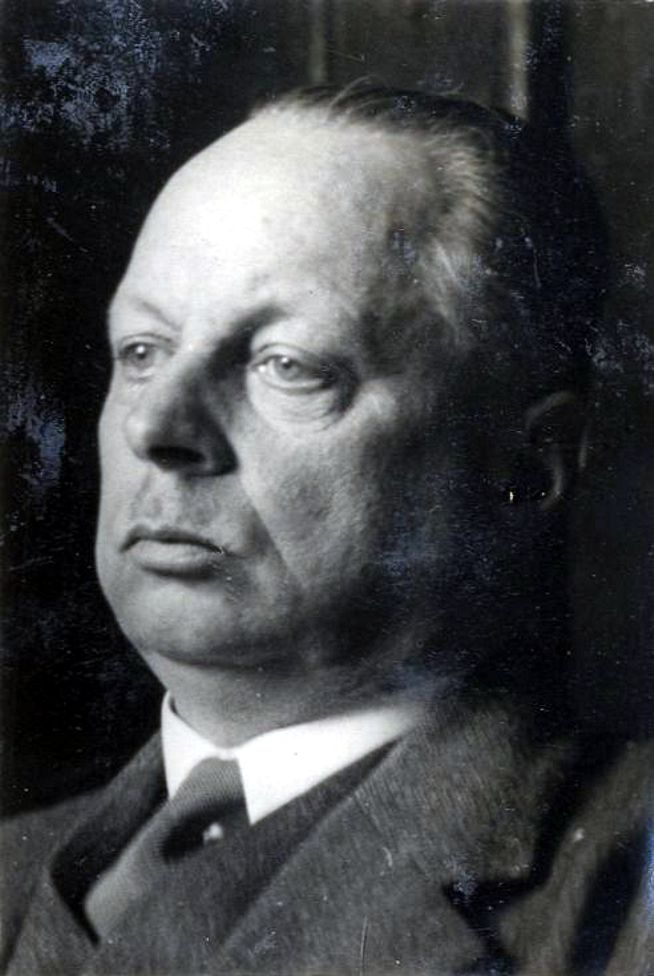
Mayor H.L.M. jonkheer Van Nispen tot Sevenaer

Hubert Louis Marie van Nispen van Sevenaer (1879–1958) was a Dutch politician and nobleman with the title of Jonkheer. He was born on 6 August 1879 in Zevenaar. He was mayor of Laren from 1909 until 1943 and from 1945 until 1946. He was also mayor of neighboring Blaricum from 1913 to 1922. His term was interrupted during World War II. The Dutch government at the time banned anyone from employment after age 65, even though he wanted to keep working, especially after having lost everything during the war.

== City planning ==
The mayor wanted to preserve the character and uniqueness of the town so much that he did not allow developers to build in the city. In 1912 he installed the "welstandbepaling," and this action was followed by many other cities. For many years he was chairman to the local "Goois Nature Reserve".

== Patron of the Arts ==
Laren and Blaricum are well-known artist towns. Van Nispen frequently purchased art and hosted expositions for local artists. He was involved with the founding of the Singer Museum and was honorary president of the Singer Memorial Foundation. Many artists, magicians and singers dedicated works to him. When he was forced to leave due to his age, a song was written as a goodbye to celebrate his long service.

== World War II ==
Refusing to cooperate with the pro-Nazi NSB government, he was forced to flee with his family. Ordered by the Sicherheitspolizei, the Dutch police in a neighboring town, Hilversum, attempted to arrest him on the night of 8/9 February 1943, but he had already found safety. He returned in April and the German authorities put him on forced leave. On 29 May that year he was officially fired and banned from the district. He moved to Garderen, Gelderland with his wife where he continued to work for the resistance. He and his family harbored pilots referred to as "jumpers" (springers) sent to the Netherlands by British special forces. On 23 October 1944 a raid was conducted at their house that found a chamber with ammunition and weapons. The place was burned to the ground. The family again escaped. The family fled to Apeldoorn, where they hid until the end of the war. On 16 May 1945 Van Nispen resumed his mayoral position.

== Recognition ==
- For his work during the war Nispen received the British "King's Medal for Courage in the Cause of Freedom".
- He received a royal appreciation and recognition from the Dutch royal family for the "welstandsbepaling" and was given the title of Officer in the Order of Orange-Nassau.

== Sources ==
- Gooien Vecht Historisch
- Streekarchief Gooi en Vechtstreek, collectie losse aanwinsten, inventarisnummer 524
- Streekarchief Gooi en Vechtstreek, gemeentebestuur Laren 1925-1989, inventarisnummer 427
- Laarder Courant De BEL, 4 maart 1958
- Laarder Courant De BEL, 25 mei 1934
- Laarder Courant De BEL, 1 juni 1934
- Laarder Courant De BEL, 18 maart 1958

== More info ==
- vannispen.info
- Europeana.eu
- Anp Archive
- War Newspapers "het nieuws"
