= Huize Sevenaer =

Castle farm in Zevenaar, the Netherlands

Coordinates: 51.9269°N 6.0777°E

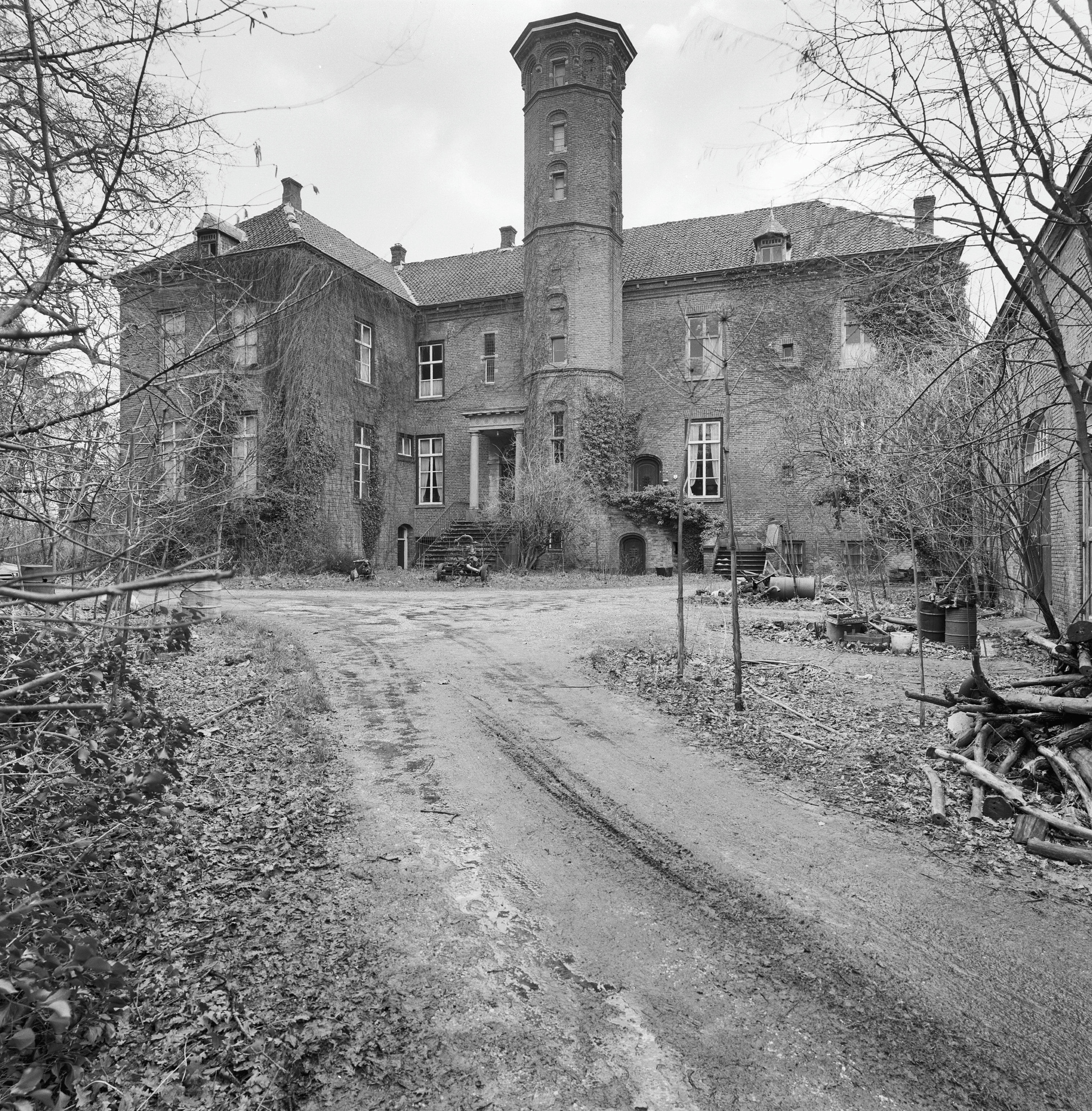
- Interactive map of the Huize Sevenaer area
- Alternative names: Huis Sevenaer, Huize Zevenaar, Huis Zevenaar or Huis Seventer

Huize Sevenaer (Huis Sevenaer, Huize Zevenaar or Huis Seventer) is a castle farm in Zevenaar, the Netherlands. The estate has existed since the 14th century and since 1947 has been the last remaining fully operational castle farm in the country, and one of the few remaining in Europe. The castle has been private property of the van Nispen family since 1785, and is owned and operated by Jonkheer Huub van Nispen van Sevenaer.

== Agriculture ==
The castle grows all its own food for its cattle and is run solely on macrobiotic principles. Huub van Nispen in public interviews announced the importance of a country's self-sufficiency to grow its own food, especially during times of crisis. Van Nispen opposed the use of pesticides and advocated for organic alternatives. This estate has been solely organic since World War II and it is believed by some to have followed similar practices earlier. Rare native plants grow on the estate. The farm is fond of companion planting and other principles now known as "permaculture" or "macrobiotic farming."

Early on as research by Dr. Grashuis made the link between certain diseases in cows and livestock and the use of artificial fertilizer. Van Nispen decided to bring the ground as well as the plants on it in a healthy balance. Van Nispen argued that ecological balance could be achieved by observing and maintaining natural systems, without the use of synthetic chemicals.

Studying insects such as lady bugs and where they fly to and from was one of the aspects of maintaining a healthy ecosystem. Bugs are beneficial, but not in large amounts. Knowing the proper function of each weed and bug is crucial in maintaining a healthy garden. Local farmers have often stopped by since they want to know why a herd of 50 Piëmontese never gets visits of a vet or get inoculated on a farm that does not even use artificial fertilizer.

== World War II ==
During World War II the castle was damaged and a fire destroyed most of the top floor and tower. Thanks to a grant, some parts of the castle can now be partially restored. For the longest time the existence of the castle and farm has been threatened by city development, which had previously been at odds with local development plans. However, thanks to recent changes, the castle has again started with renovation.

== Post World War II ==
The City Zevenaar initiated proceedings in 1948 to expropriate parts of the estate for redevelopment.. The decades long lawsuit was led by his father, who was the mayor of Laren and then taken over the himself. Despite media efforts to preserve the landscape and cultural heritage, the Dutch government disowned a large portion of the lands. A Dutch paper - het Algemeen Dagblad - stated: "Company of healing produce forced to make way for factory making cancer inducing products." The family had lost a lot during the war and the countless lawsuits with the government, leaving no funds available to properly restore the castle from the damages during WWII. After decades of legal disputes with local and national authorities for the existence of the farm and cultural heritage, finally group of supporters later contributed funds to support the restoration of the estate.

== Cultural heritage ==
It has been speculated that Mozart may have visited the castle, as the family archives once contained manuscripts attributed to him. A concert titled "Muziek uit het Archief" (Music from the Archives) was performed on 30 September 2005. However, during World War II the castle was occupied by the German army. Many manuscripts and books from Huize Sevenaer and Huize Pannerden, a neighboring estate, were used as fill to repair roads. The archives have been in poor condition since soldiers used stacks of papers from the archives as insulation to sleep in between during the cold winters. Consequently it has been taken years to update and restore the family archives.

== Rose Gardens ==
Visitors to the castle in the 1950s and 1960s often recalled its rose gardens, which included a rare variety known as "Ophelia".

== Visitors ==
The castle is open to the public for scheduled tours and they also have educational tours for children. Frequently, volunteers are selected to learn about their farming methods.
