= Oud-Zevenaar =

- Village
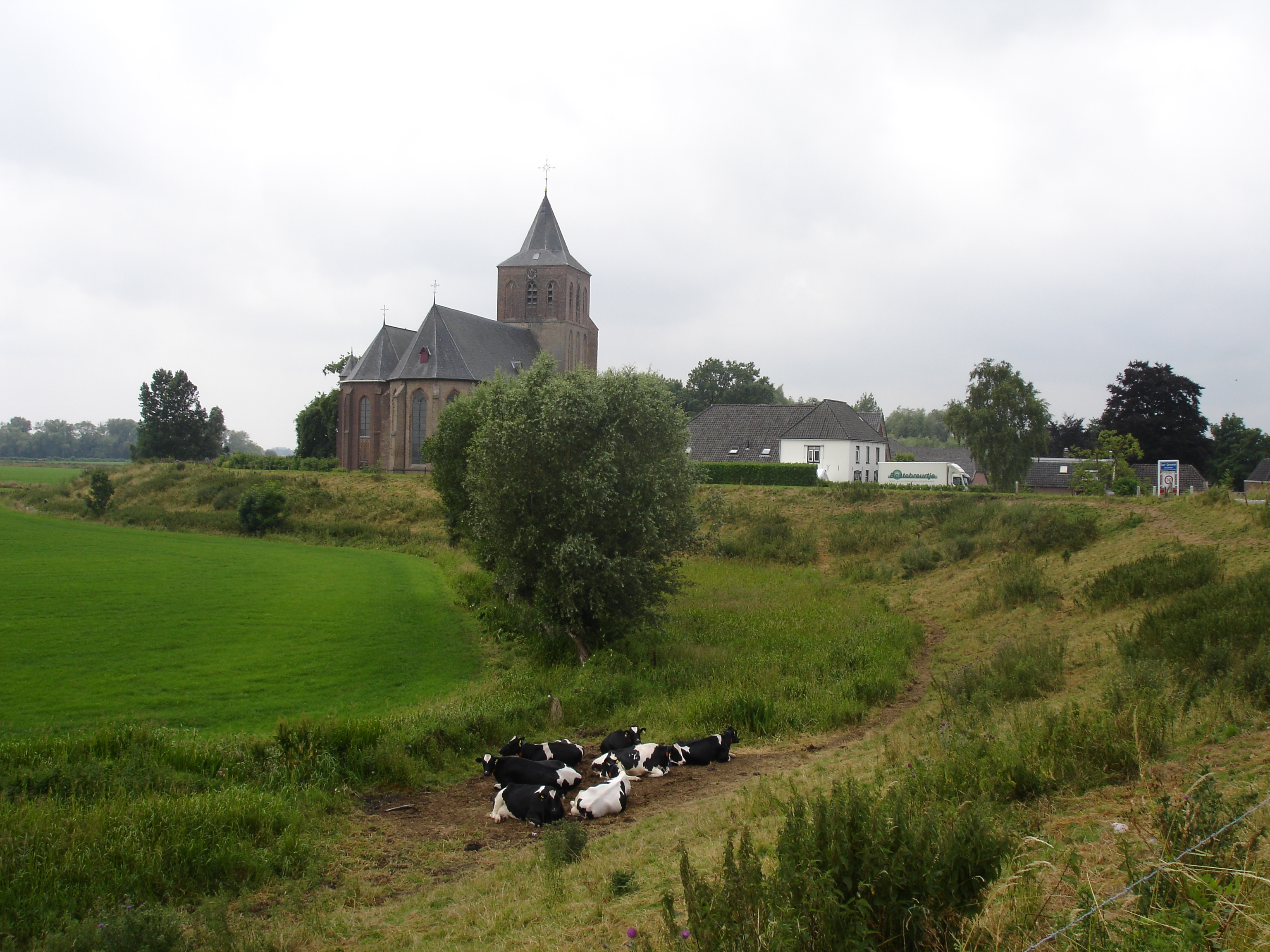
- View on Oud-Zevenaar

- Location in the Netherlands Oud-Zevenaar (Netherlands)
- Coordinates: 51.9149°N 6.0815°E
- Country: Netherlands
- Province: Gelderland
- Municipality: Zevenaar

Area
  - Total: 0.52 km^{2} (0.20 sq mi)
- Elevation: 11 m (36 ft)

Population (2021)
  - Total: 600
  - Density: 1,200/km^{2} (3,000/sq mi)
- Time zone: UTC+1 (CET)
  - Summer (DST): UTC+2 (CEST)
- Postal code: 6905
- Dialing code: 0316

Oud-Zevenaar (Dutch pronunciation: [ˌʌutˈseːvənaːr]) is a village in the municipality of Zevenaar in the province of Gelderland, the Netherlands. It is located to the south of Zevenaar

The village was first mentioned in 1047 as Subenhara. The etymology is unclear. It uses oud (old) to distinguish from Zevenaar which was known as Nieu-Zeventer in 1725, but has reverted to plain Zevenaar. The village developed along the Oude Rijn. In 1487, Zevenaar received city rights, and became the economic centre. The development of Oud-Zevenaar remained limited. The Catholic St.Martinuskerk was first mentioned in 1276. In 1572, the tower burnt down. The church was restored in 1616. Grist mill De Hoop was built in 1850.

== Gallery ==
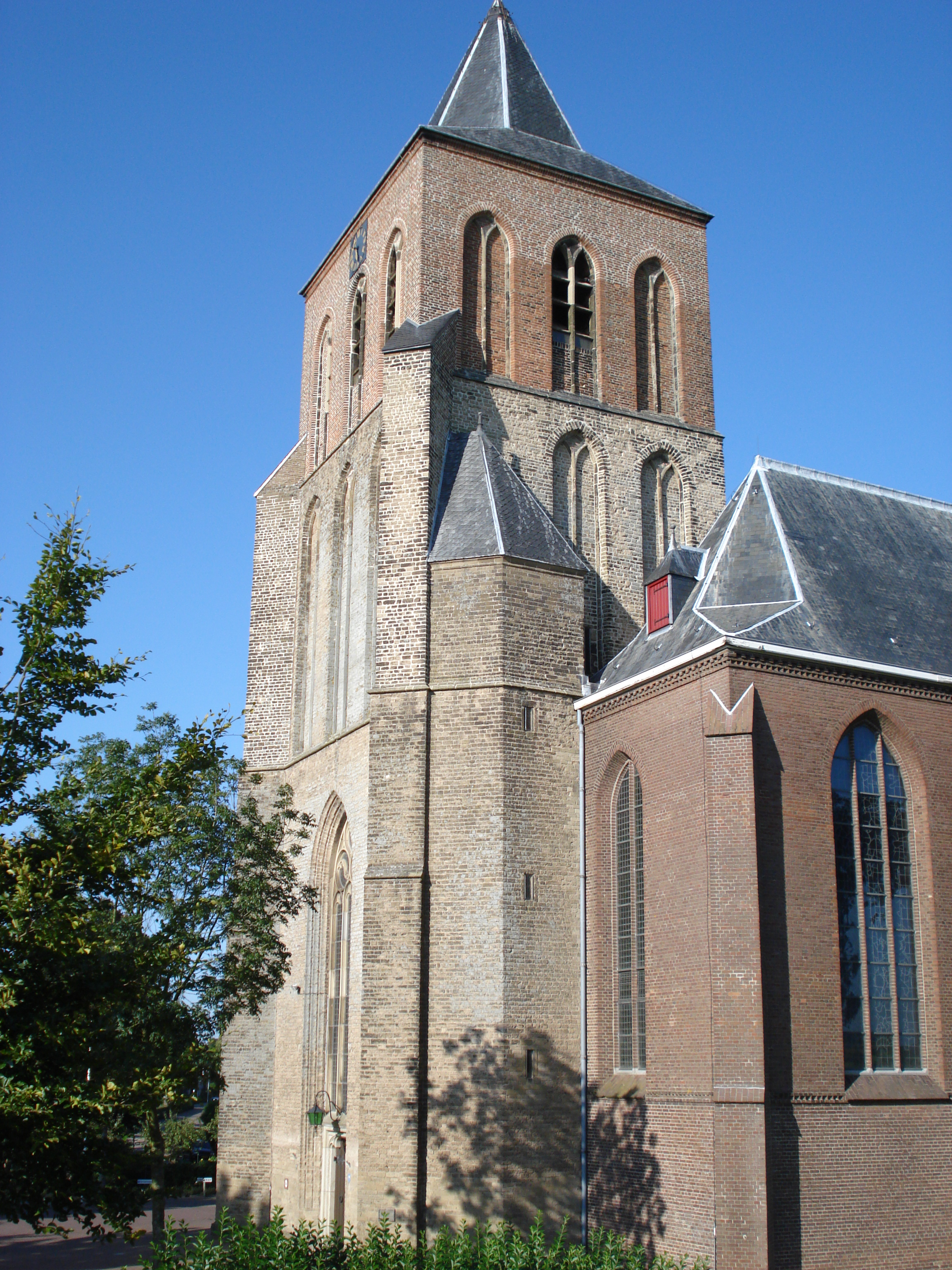
St.Martinuskerk

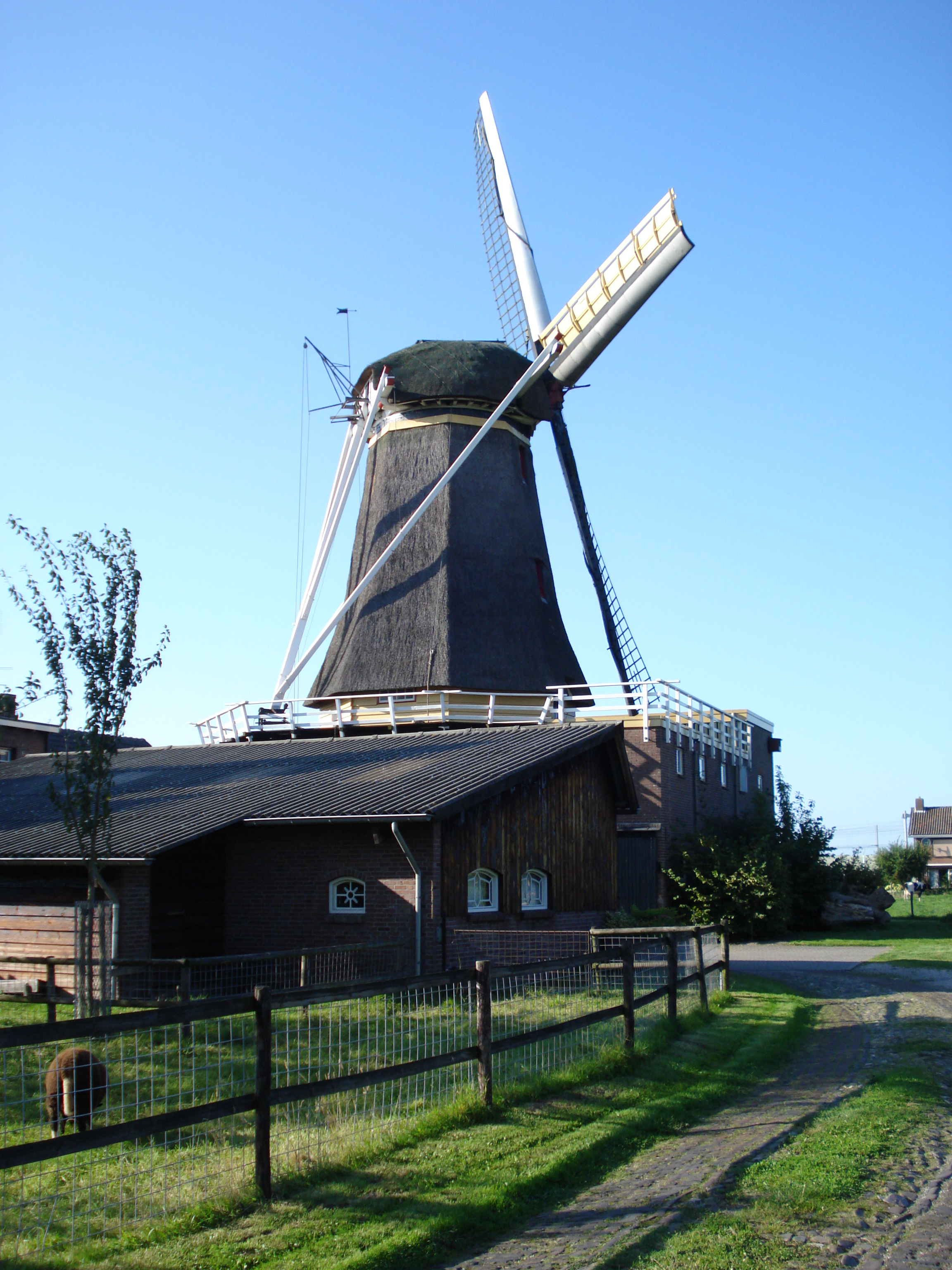
Windmill De Hoop

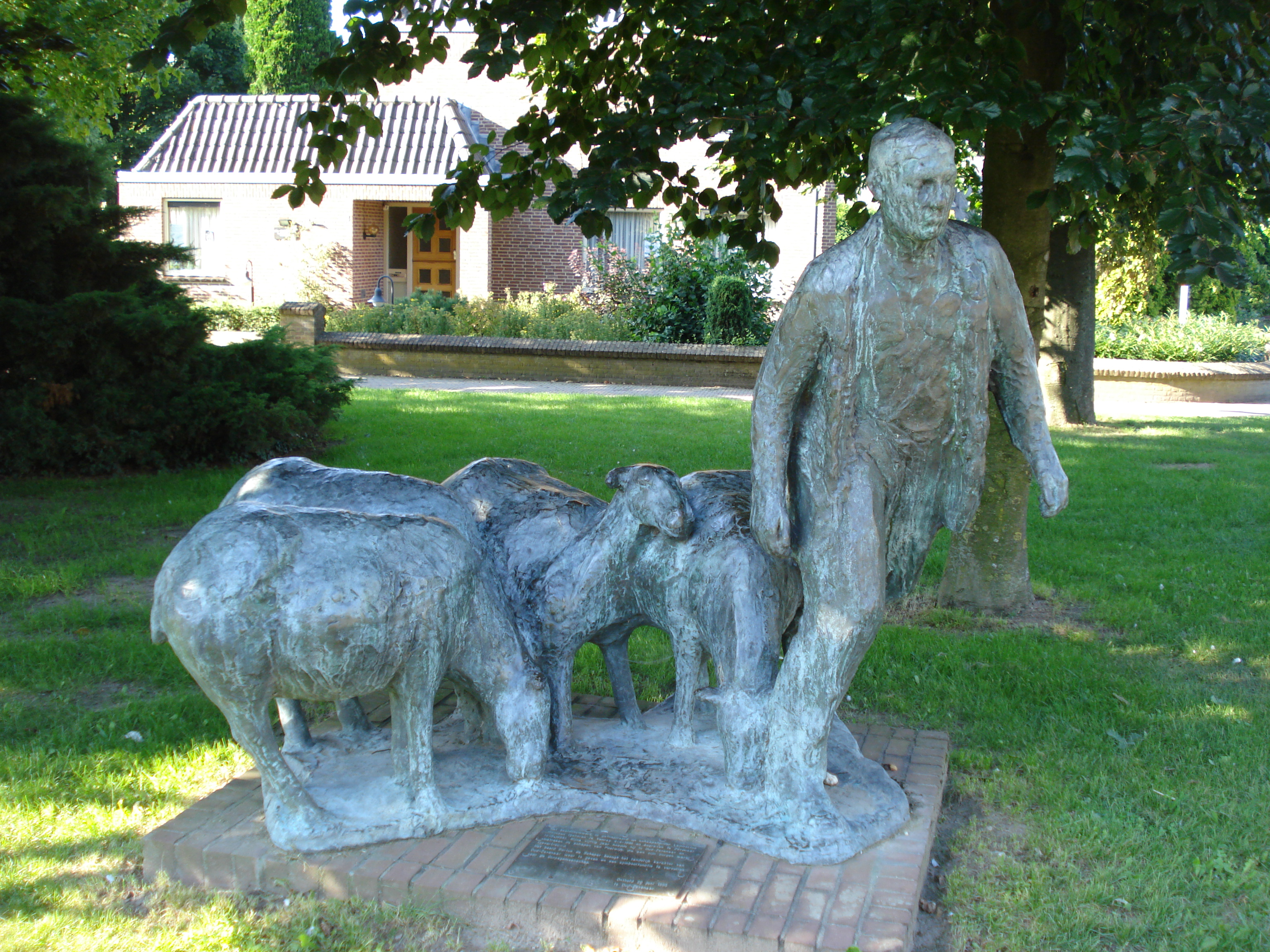
Shepherd with sheep statue

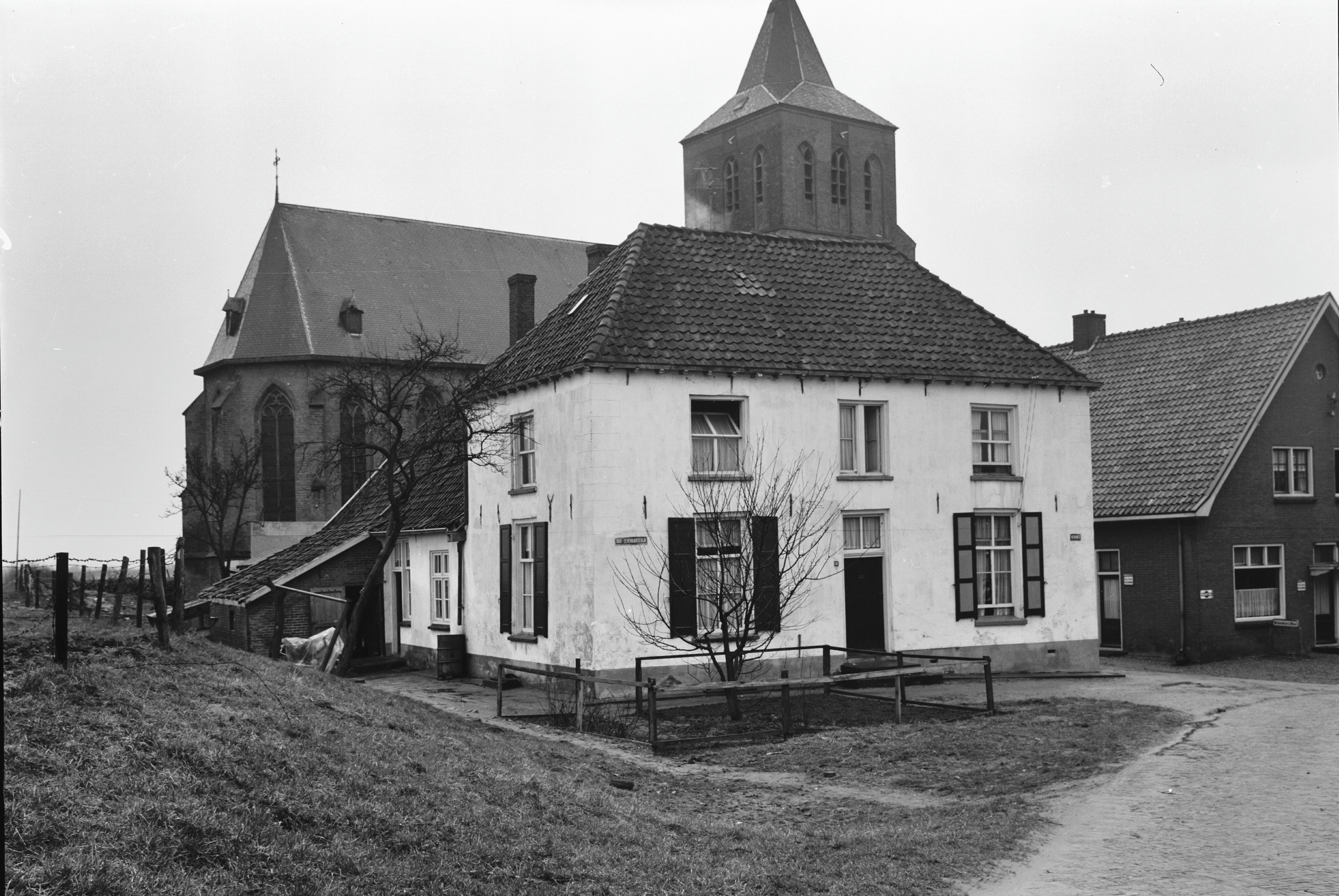
