= Bahr, Netherlands =

Bahr
- Hamlet
- Coat of arms

- Location in the province of Gelderland in the Netherlands Bahr (Netherlands)
- Coordinates: 51°59′4″N 6°2′43″E
- Country: Netherlands
- Province: Gelderland
- Municipality: Zevenaar

Bahr is a hamlet in the Dutch province of Gelderland. It is located in the municipality Zevenaar, about 3 km southeast of Rheden.

The village was first mentioned in 1272 as de Bare. It may mean "barren land". It became part of Gelderland in 1735. The hamlet has no place name signs. In 1840, it was home to 144 people. Nowadays it consists of about 20 houses.

According to the 19th-century historian A.J. van der Aa, it had about 170 inhabitants in the middle of the 19th century. The large castle "Bahr" was located here, until it was demolished after a siege in 1495.

== See also ==
- Van Baer (family)
