= Giesbeek =

- Village
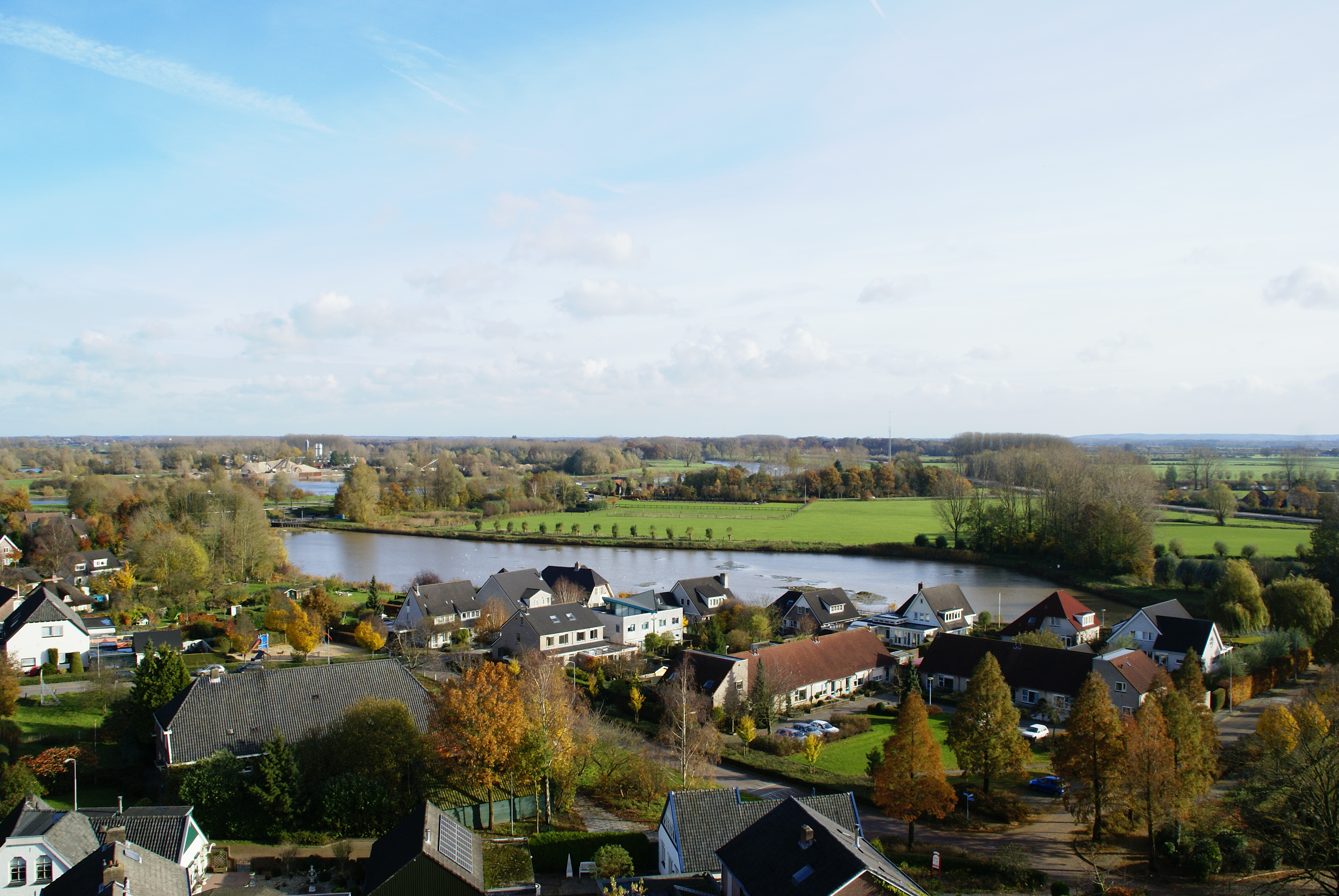
- View from the church tower

- Location in the Netherlands Giesbeek (Netherlands)
- Coordinates: 51°59′40″N 6°04′10″E
- Country: Netherlands
- Province: Gelderland
- Municipality: Zevenaar

Area
  - Total: 1.81 km^{2} (0.70 sq mi)
- Elevation: 11 m (36 ft)

Population (2021)
  - Total: 2,695
  - Density: 1,490/km^{2} (3,860/sq mi)
- Time zone: UTC+1 (CET)
  - Summer (DST): UTC+2 (CEST)
- Postal code: 6987
- Dialing code: 0313

Giesbeek is a village in the municipality of Zevenaar in the province of Gelderland, the Netherlands.

The village was first mentioned between 1378 and 1379 to Ghisebeke. The etymology is unclear. In 1840, it was home to 399 people. The Roman Catholic St. Martinus Church was built in 1909 as a replacement of an 1834 church. The tower was destroyed in 1945, and initially not rebuilt. In 2010, a new tower was officially opened.

The grist mill De Hoop was built in 1888. In 1964, it was decommissioned, and the interior and the artificial hill were removed. In 1979, it was bought by the municipality, restored in 1981, and once again grinding flour for bakeries.

== Gallery ==
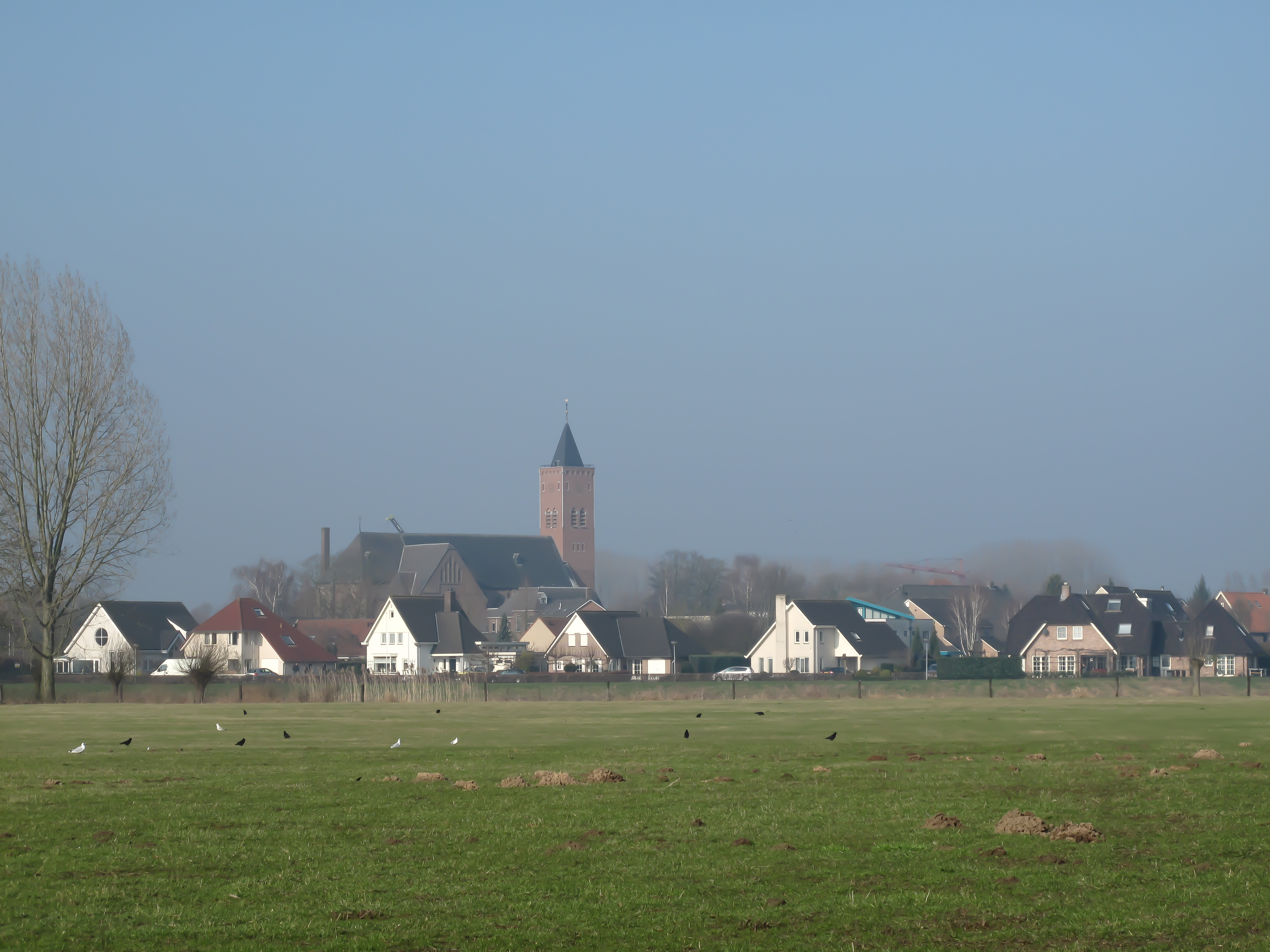
Village

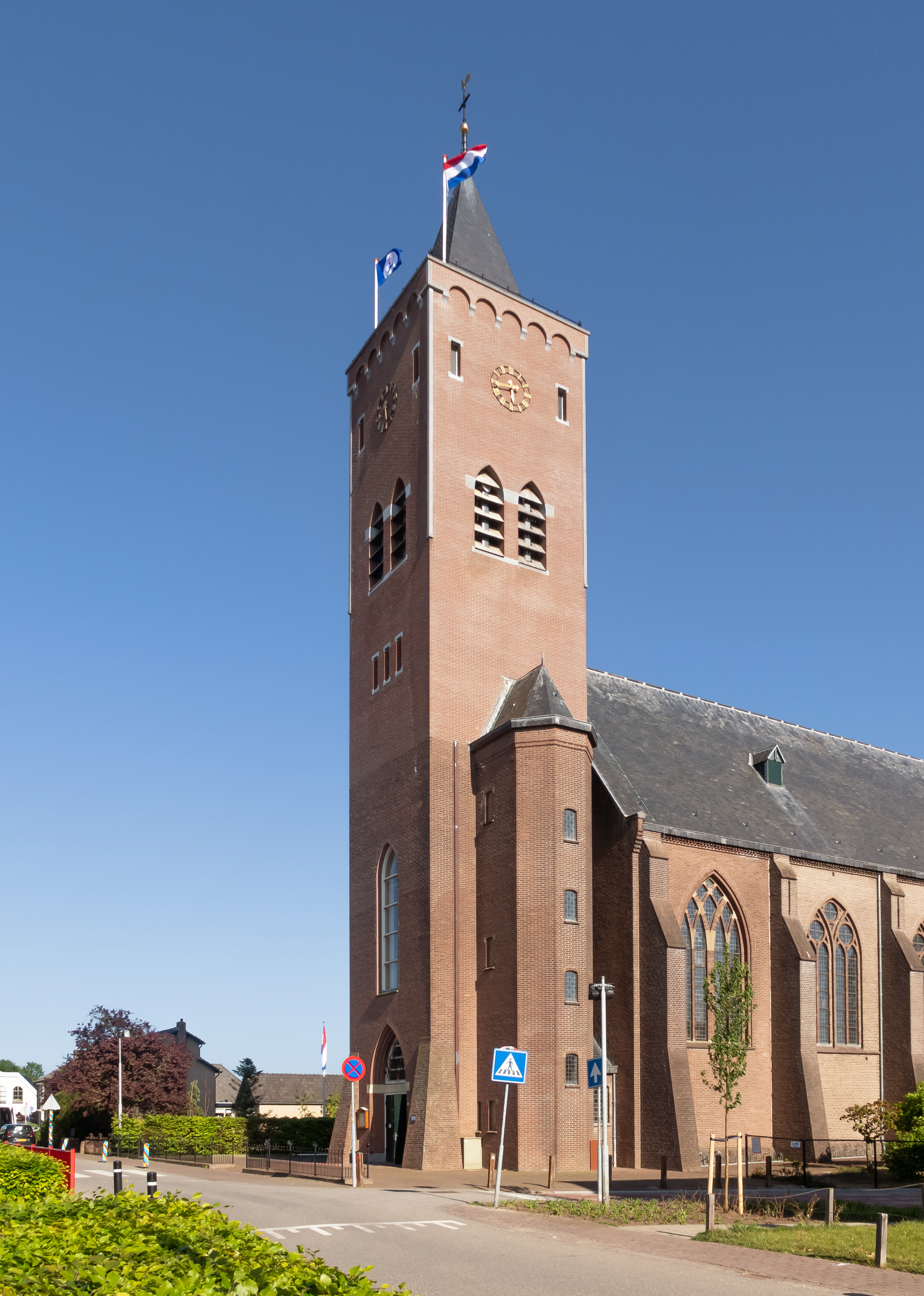
Church

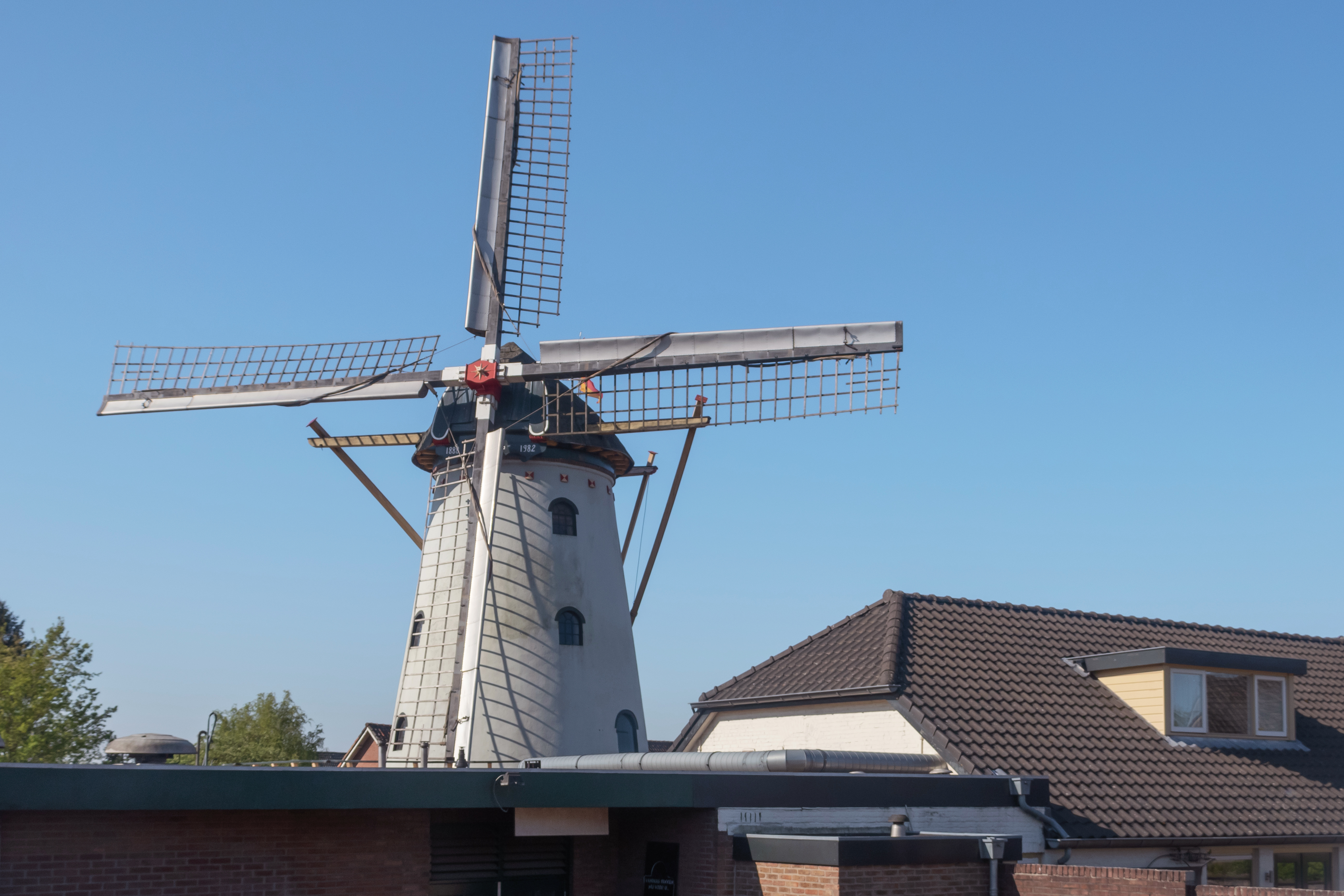
Windmill

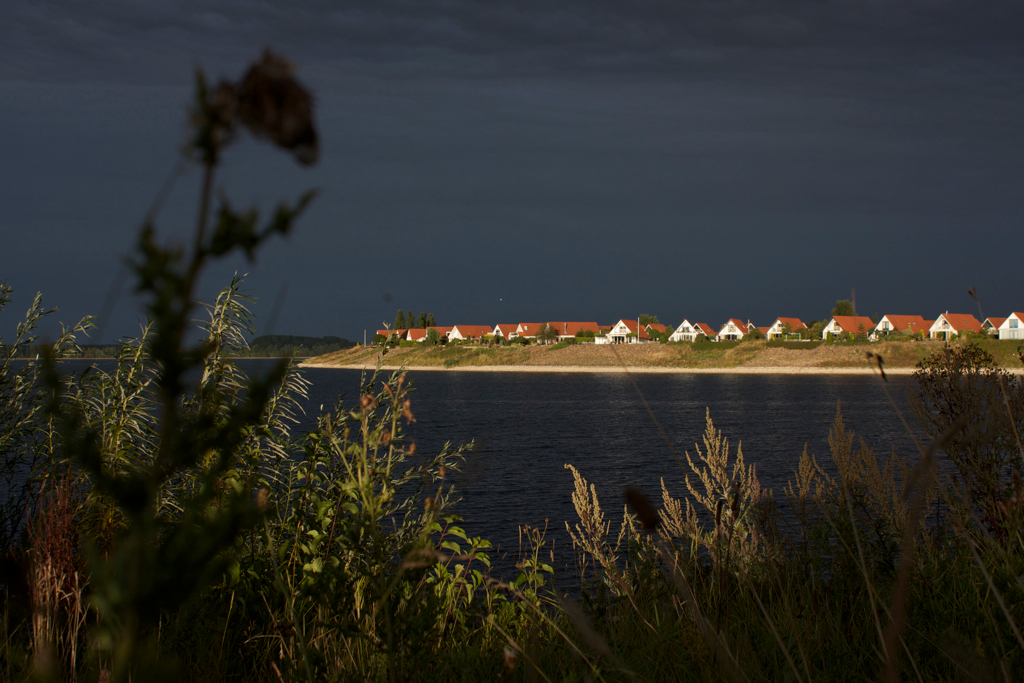
Camping during a storm
