= Lathum =

- Village
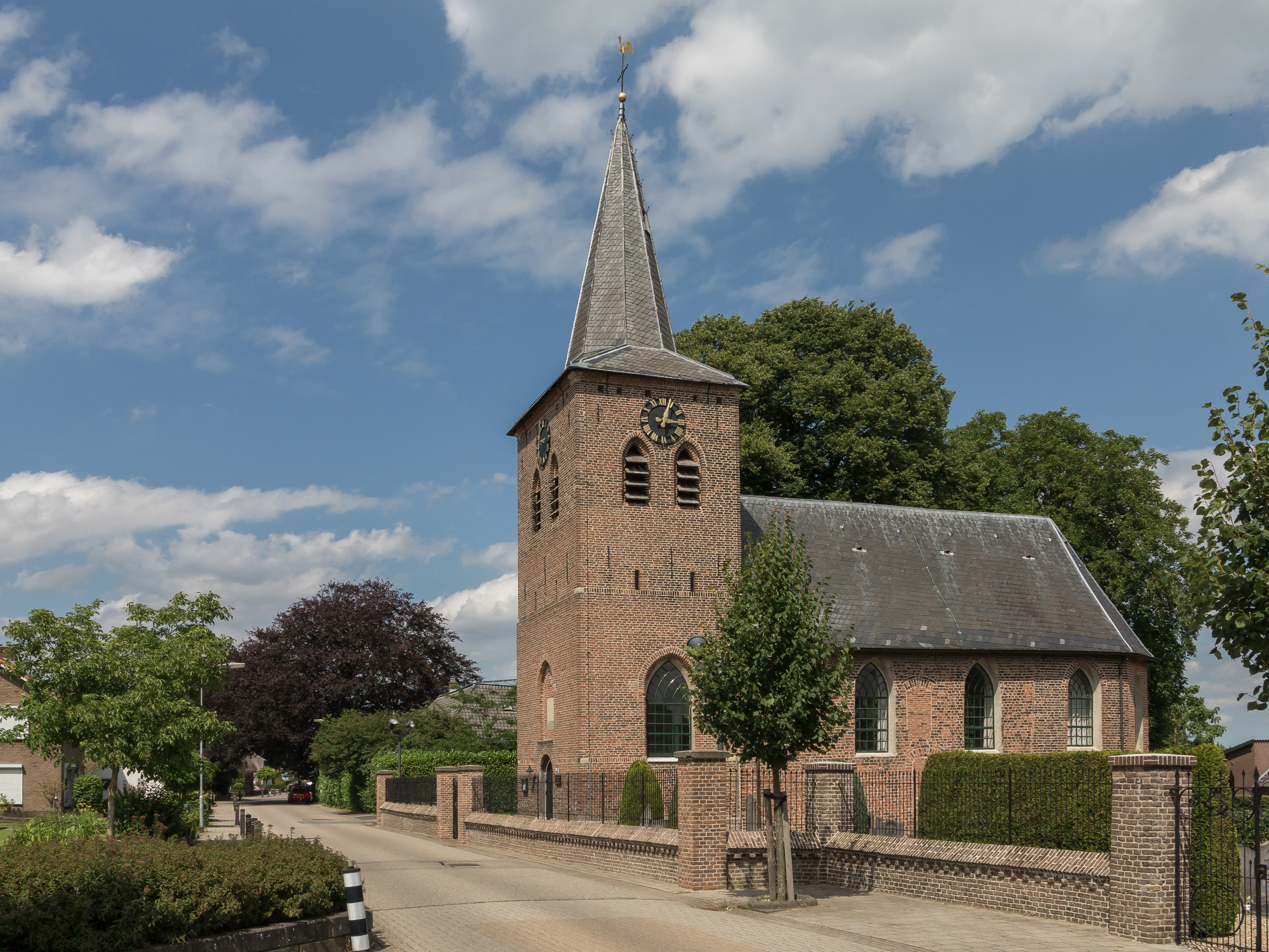
- Reformed church

- Location in the Netherlands Lathum (Netherlands)
- Coordinates: 51.98703°N 6.01913°E
- Country: Netherlands
- Province: Gelderland
- Municipality: Zevenaar

Area
  - Total: 1.42 km^{2} (0.55 sq mi)
- Elevation: 11 m (36 ft)

Population (2021)
  - Total: 520
  - Density: 370/km^{2} (950/sq mi)
- Time zone: UTC+1 (CET)
  - Summer (DST): UTC+2 (CEST)
- Postal code: 6988
- Dialing code: 0313

Lathum is a village in the municipality of Zevenaar in the province of Gelderland, the Netherlands.

The village was first mentioned between 1294 and 1295 as Latheym, and means "settlement of Laeta (lit: serf)". Lathum developed near the Castle Bahr en Lathum. The castle was first mentioned in 1243, and destroyed in 1495. In the early 17th century, a manor house was built in its place. The Dutch Reformed Church probably started as a chapel. It was built in the late-15th century and has 14th century elements. In 1840, it was home to 242 people. In the 1990s, Riverparc was constructed on the location of the former brickworks.

== Gallery ==
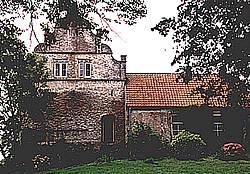
Huize "Lathum"

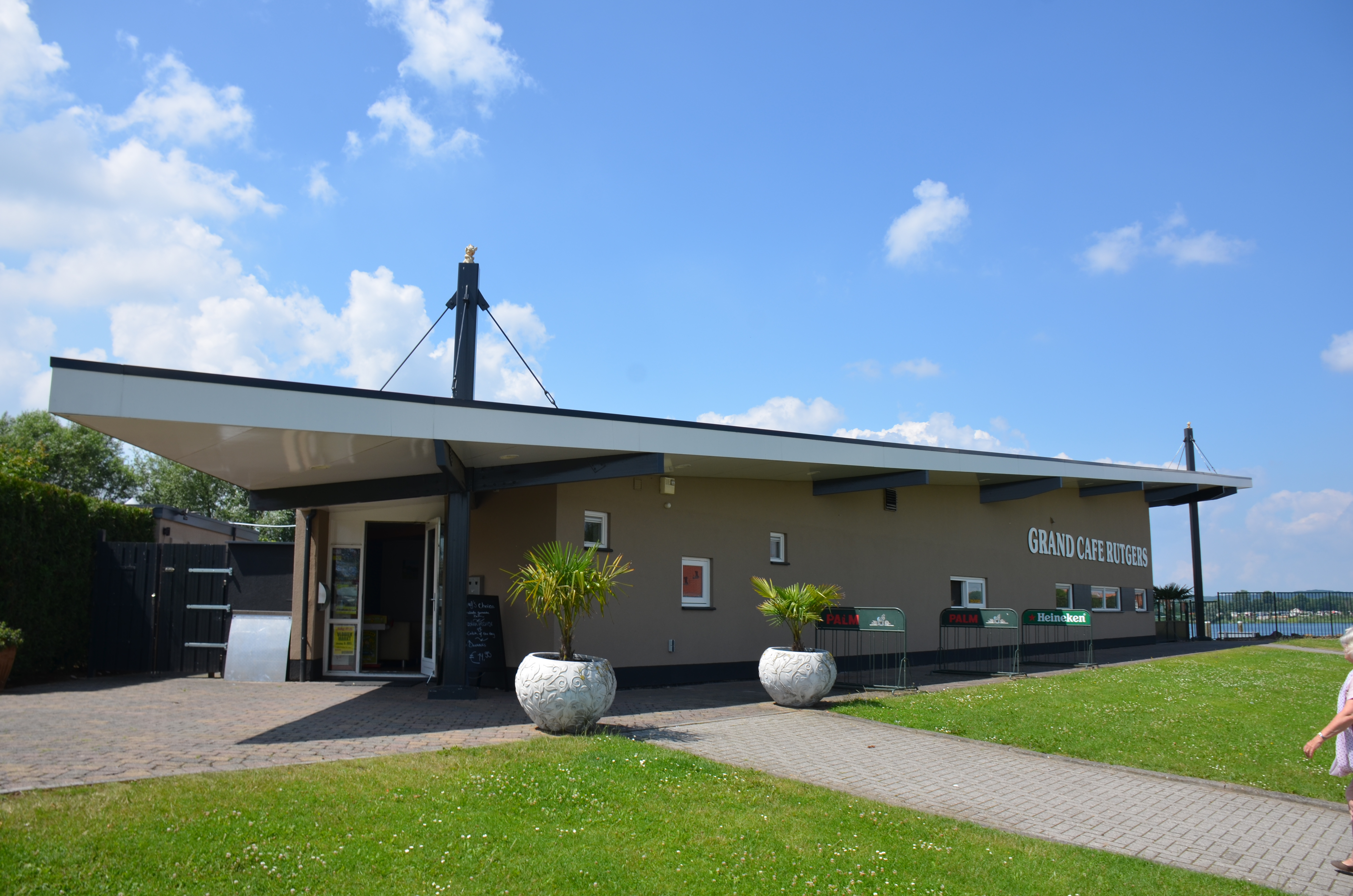
Cafe Restaurant

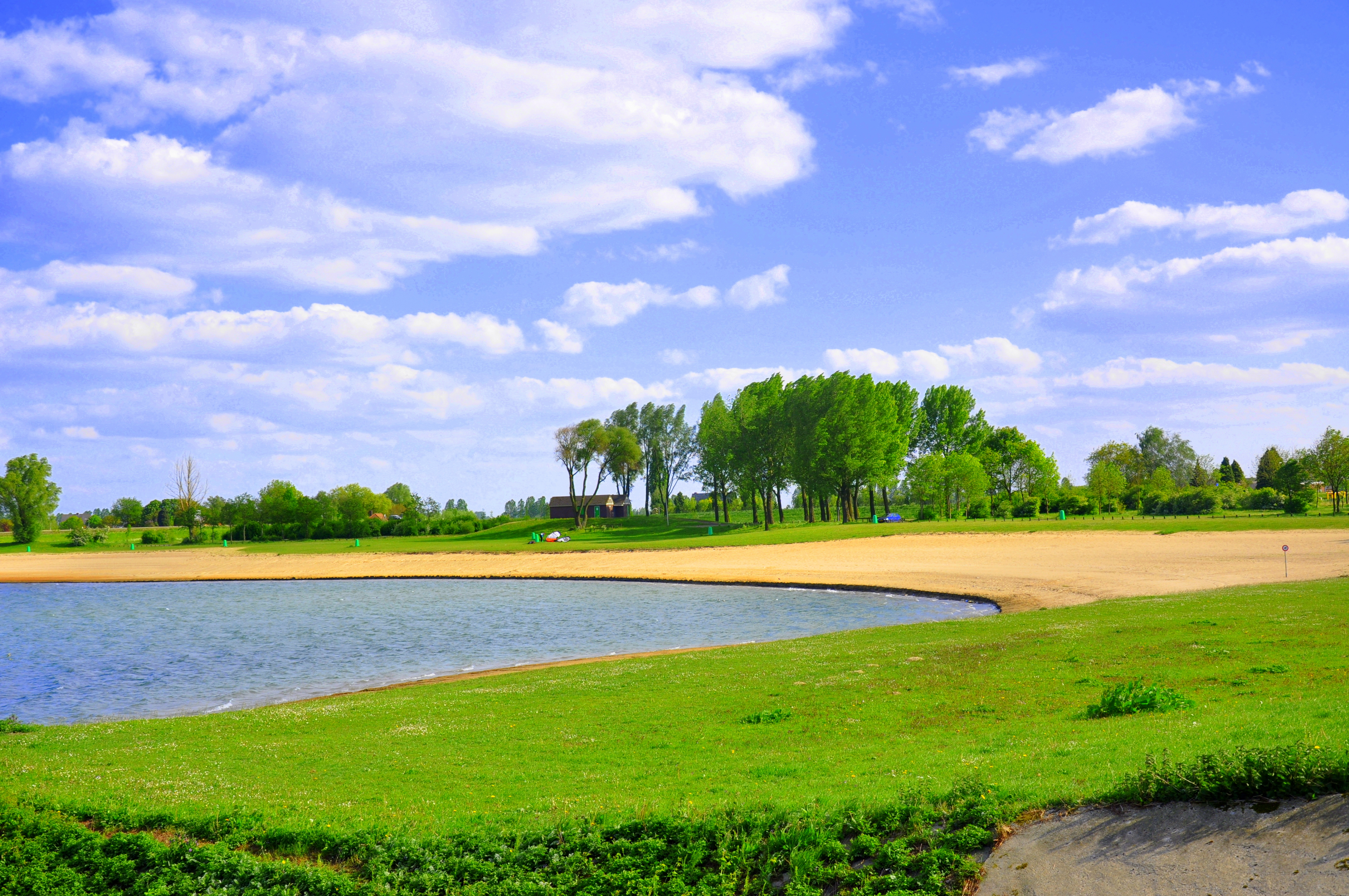
Beach at Lathumse Plas

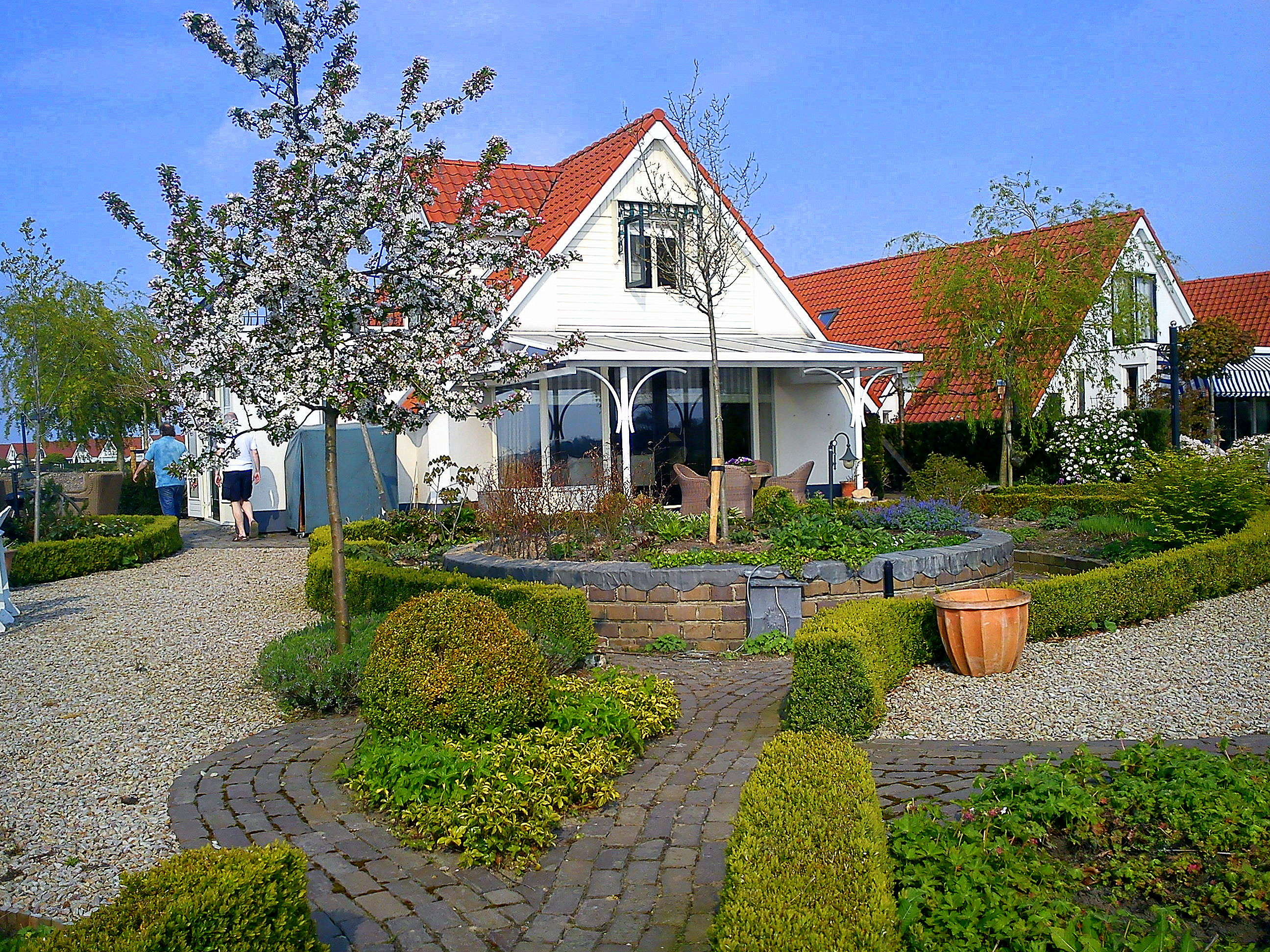
Beach House

== See also ==
- Van Baer (family)
