= Zevenaar =

- City and municipality
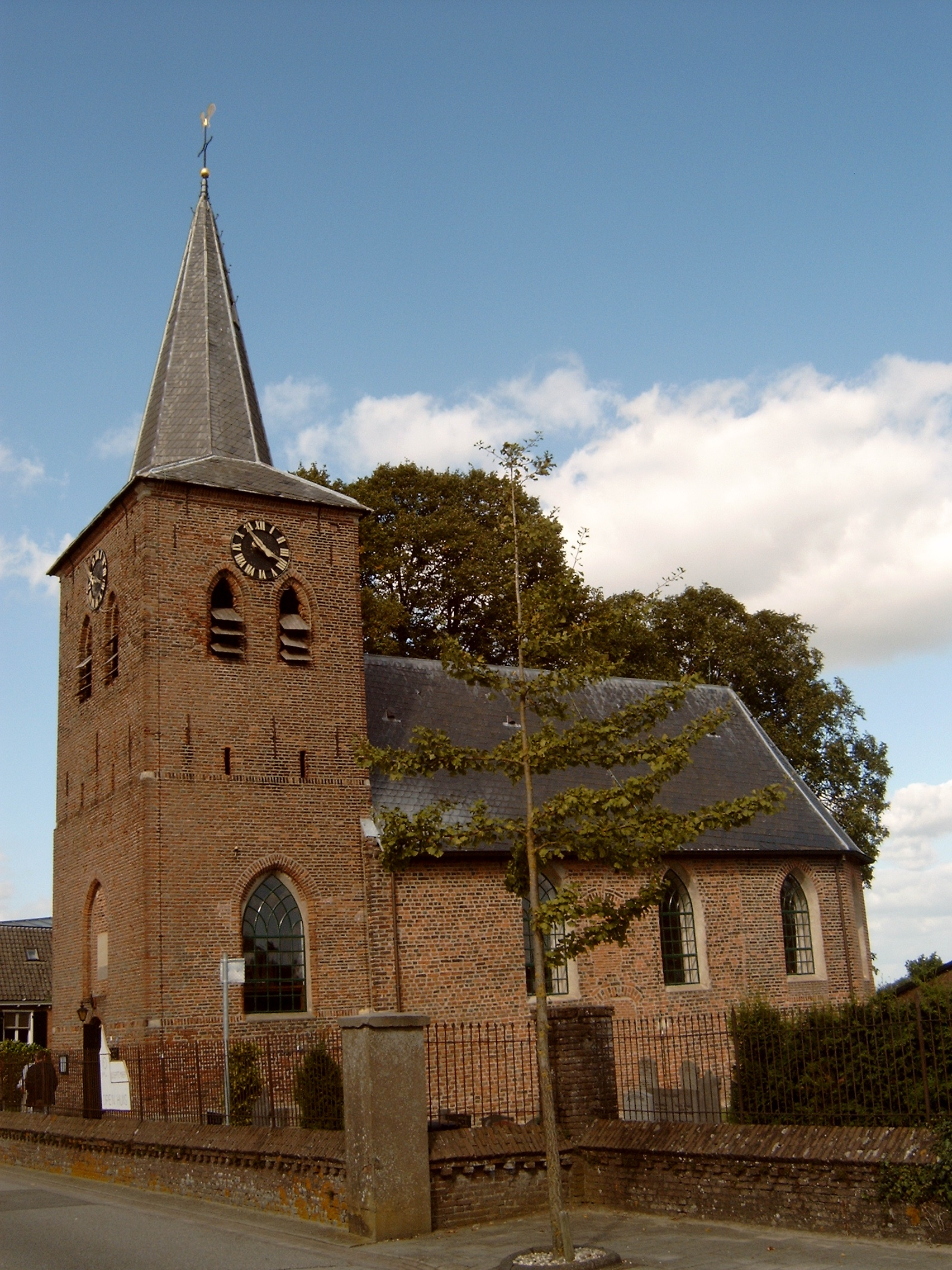
- Church in Lathum

- Flag Coat of arms

- Location in Gelderland
- Coordinates: 51°55′N 6°4′E
- Country: Netherlands
- Province: Gelderland

Government
  - Body: Municipal council
  - Mayor: Luciën van Riswijk

Area
  - Total: 106.10 km^{2} (40.97 sq mi)
  - Land: 92.60 km^{2} (35.75 sq mi)
  - Water: 13.50 km^{2} (5.21 sq mi)
- Elevation: 12 m (39 ft)

Population (January 2021)
  - Total: 44,096
  - Density: 476/km^{2} (1,230/sq mi)
- Demonym: Zevenaarder
- Time zone: UTC+1 (CET)
  - Summer (DST): UTC+2 (CEST)
- Postcode: 6900–6909, 6986–6988
- Area code: 0313, 0316
- Website: www.zevenaar.nl

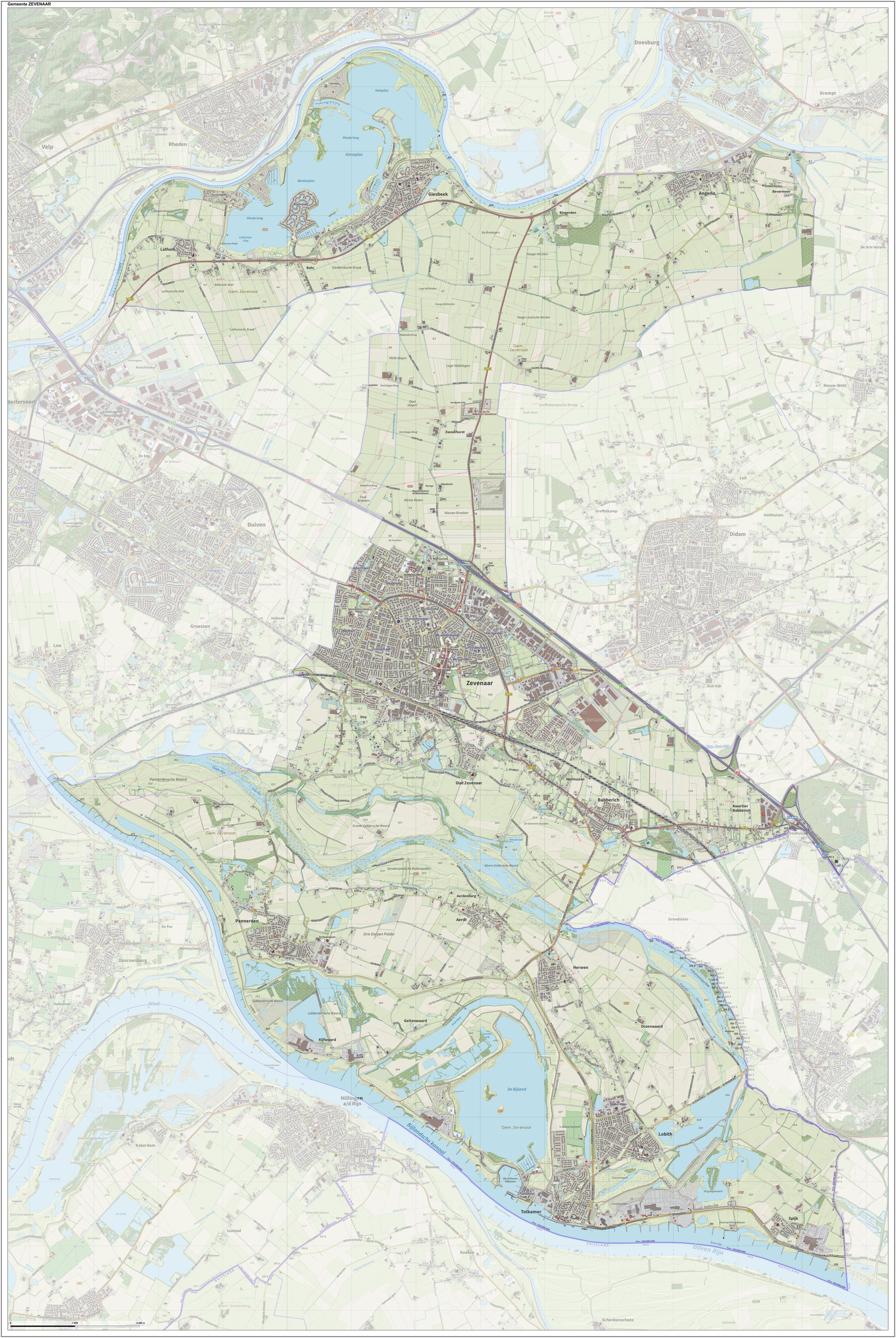
Map of the municipality of Zevenaar, Sept. 2014

Zevenaar (Dutch pronunciation: [ˈzeːvənaːr]) is a municipality and a city in the Gelderland province, in the eastern Netherlands near the border with Germany.

In January 2018 the neighbouring municipality of Rijnwaarden was merged with Zevenaar.

== History ==
The earliest signs of human activity are remains of a 700 BC settlement found near present-day Zevenaar. In 1049, Emperor Hendrik III donated a large amount of land to five warlords the leader of whom was named Bartholomeus II of Sevenaer. They founded a castle to protect the old Roman settlements from the Germans.

In 1355 Sevenaer passed from the control of the county/Duchy of Guelders (to which the modern Dutch province of Gelderland refers) to the Duchy of Cleves (Cleveland).

In 1487, the duke of Cleves gave Sevenaer city rights. Sevenaer was an important strategic point – the area between Gelderland and Cleveland was the border between the regions that would, over the centuries, be controlled from different centers of power – the modern states of The Netherlands and Prussia (later, Germany). Some of the Castles and houses in Zevenaar have foundations dating back to the 14th century, including Huize Sevenaer.

When Sevenaer obtained city rights, it had the monopoly on markets and on sale of bread and beer with the surrounding towns. Also the jurisdiction in Sevenaer was founded, with the town government charging taxes so that the town could build roads and public buildings. For the 500 inhabitants this was a heavy tax. Because of the plundering by passing armies, there were not enough supplies and money to build anything. In that time some well-to-do families got the right to participate in government. Sevenaer then experienced a prosperous period.

In 1614 Sevenaer, as part of the Duchy of Cleves, fell under control of the Margraviate of Brandenburg which would eventually become part of Prussia.

In 1793 the city had 900 inhabitants.

In 1816, Sevenaer became part of the Kingdom of the Netherlands. Two years later the old spelling of Sevenaer was changed to the current name: Zevenaar. The municipality then had 2564 inhabitants. The 19th century was a time of poverty, bad harvests, sicknesses and hunger, with little trade and work. Many people lived by agriculture or from charity. In 1856 Zevenaar was connected to the European railroad system which, some decades later, led to the increase in workforce.

In 1920, the cigarette factory Turmac came which insured more employment.

After the second World War, which caused a lot of damage, people started to rebuild, and new residential areas arose around the old core. In the 1950s approximately 10,000 people lived in Zevenaar. By 2005, that number had more than doubled to 22,500 inhabitants. The municipality of Zevenaar consists of the following residential areas, which together had 31,840 inhabitants in January 2007 (source: CBS).

- Angerlo
- Babberich
- Giesbeek
- Lathum
- Ooy
- Oud Zevenaar
- Zevenaar
- Lobith
- Herwen
- Tolkamer
- Tuindorp
- Spijk

== Notable residents ==
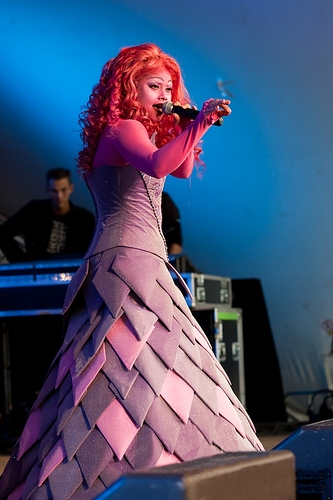
Linda Wagenmakers, 2009

- Andreas Masius (1514–1573) Catholic priest, humanist and European scholar
- H. L. M. van Nispen van Sevenaer (1879–1958) politician, nobleman, Mayor of Laren and Blaricum and resistance fighter
- Karel de Nerée tot Babberich (1880–1909) symbolist artist
- Theo van de Klundert (born 1936 in Herwen en Aerdt–2024) economist and academic
- Thijs van Leer (born 1948) musician, known for the band Focus.
- Jan van Aken (born 1961 in Herwen en Aerdt) Dutch writer and academic
- Jeroen van Veen (born 1969 in Herwen en Aerdt) classical pianist and composer
- Linda Wagenmakers (born 1975) singer and voice actress
- Esmée Denters (born 1988) female singer

=== Sport ===
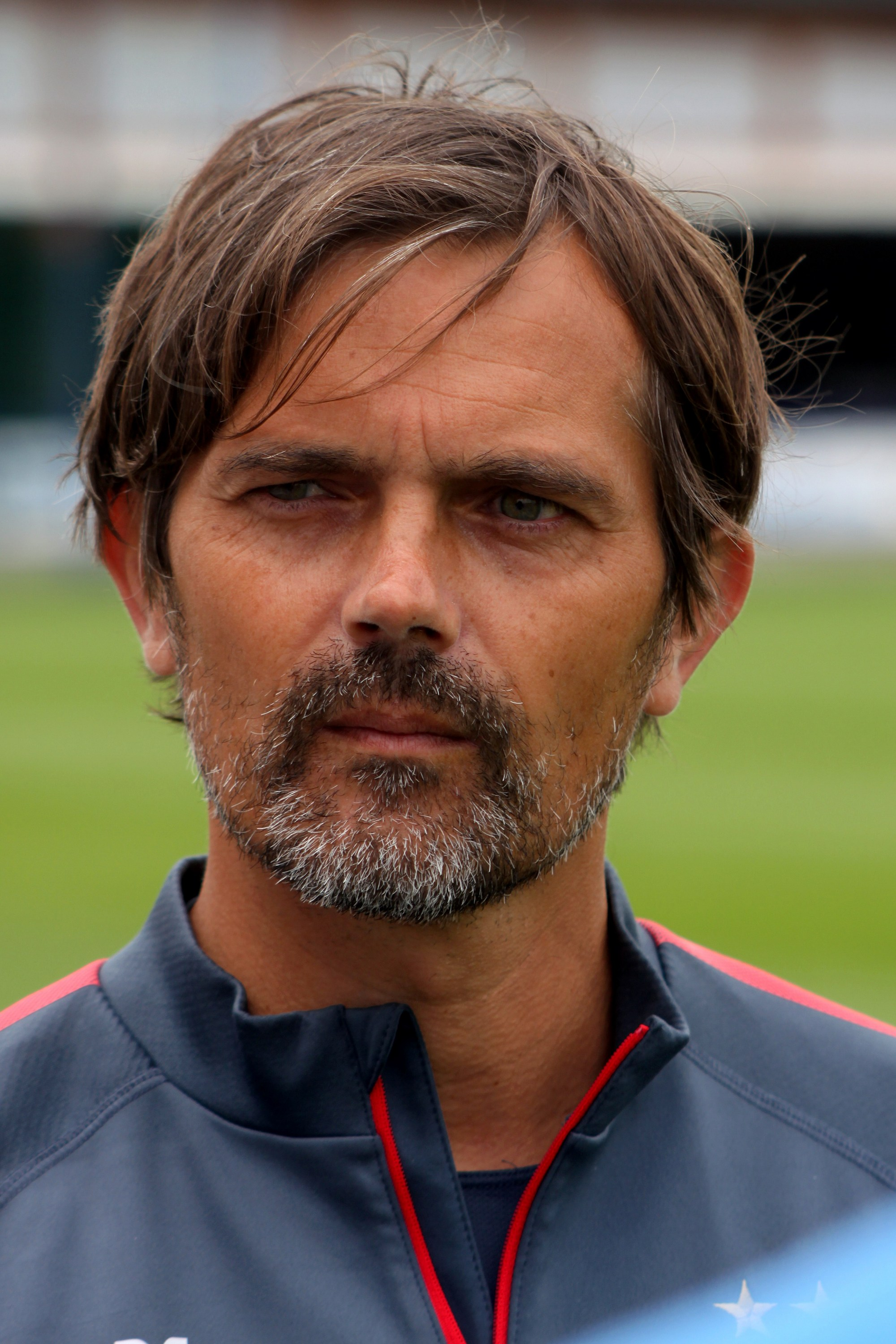
Phillip Cocu, 2014

- Minie Brinkhoff (born 1952) retired Dutch cyclist
- Erik Parlevliet (1964–2007) field hockey player, team bronze medallist at the 1988 Summer Olympics
- Phillip Cocu (born 1970) professional football manager with SBV Vitesse and former player with 598 club caps
- Servais Knaven (born 1971 in Lobith) Dutch professional road bicycle racer, competed at the 1992 and 2004 Summer Olympics
- Danny Heister (born 1971) professional table tennis player
- Elke Slagt-Tichelman (born 1977) politician
- Nick Oudendag (born 1987) professional basketball player
- Wesley Koolhof (born 1989) tennis player
- Mex Jansen (born 2006) racing driver

== Image gallery ==
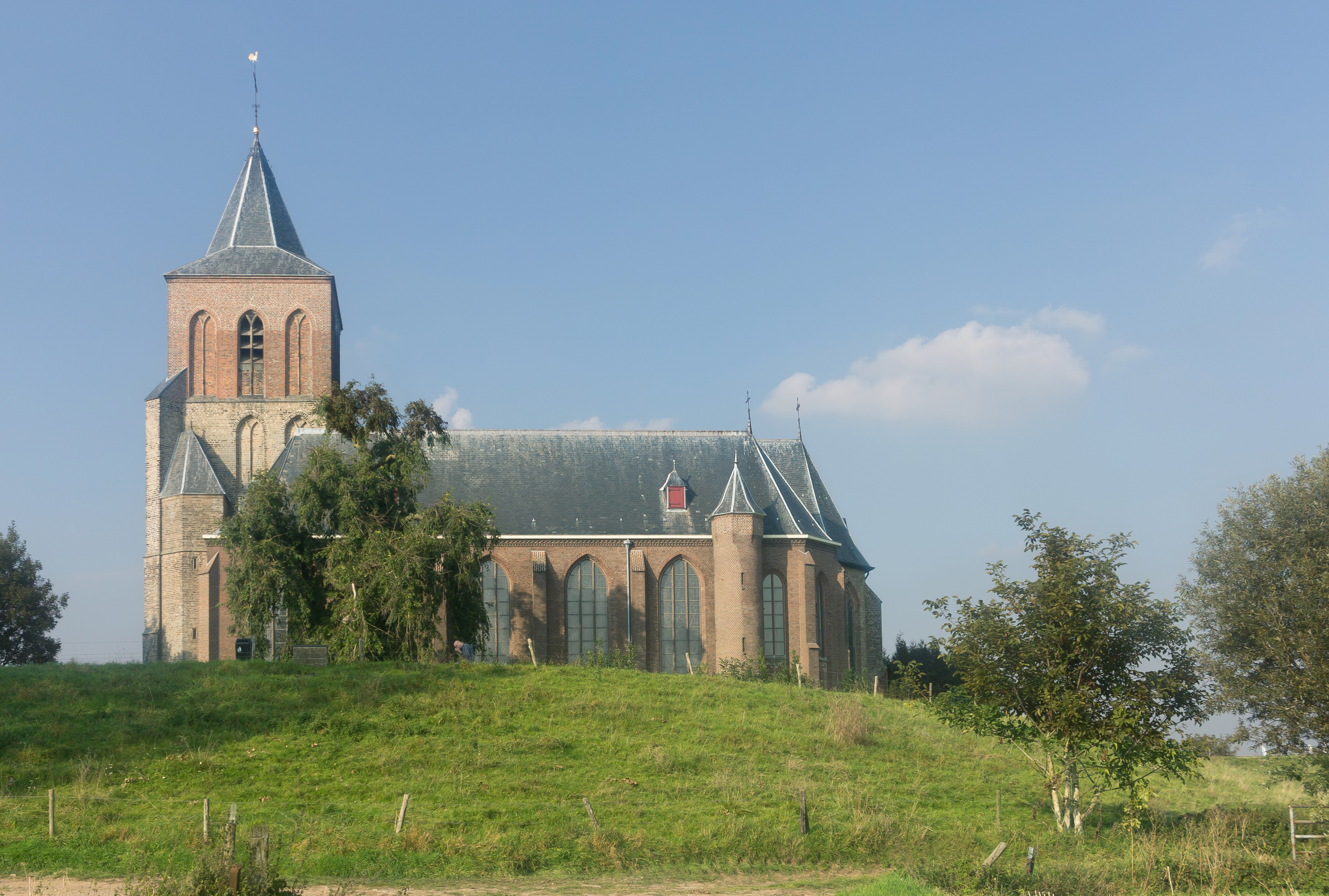
Oud-Zevenaar

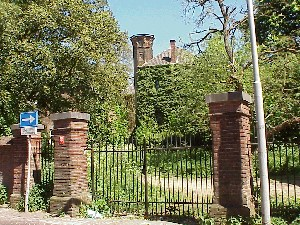
Huize Sevenaer

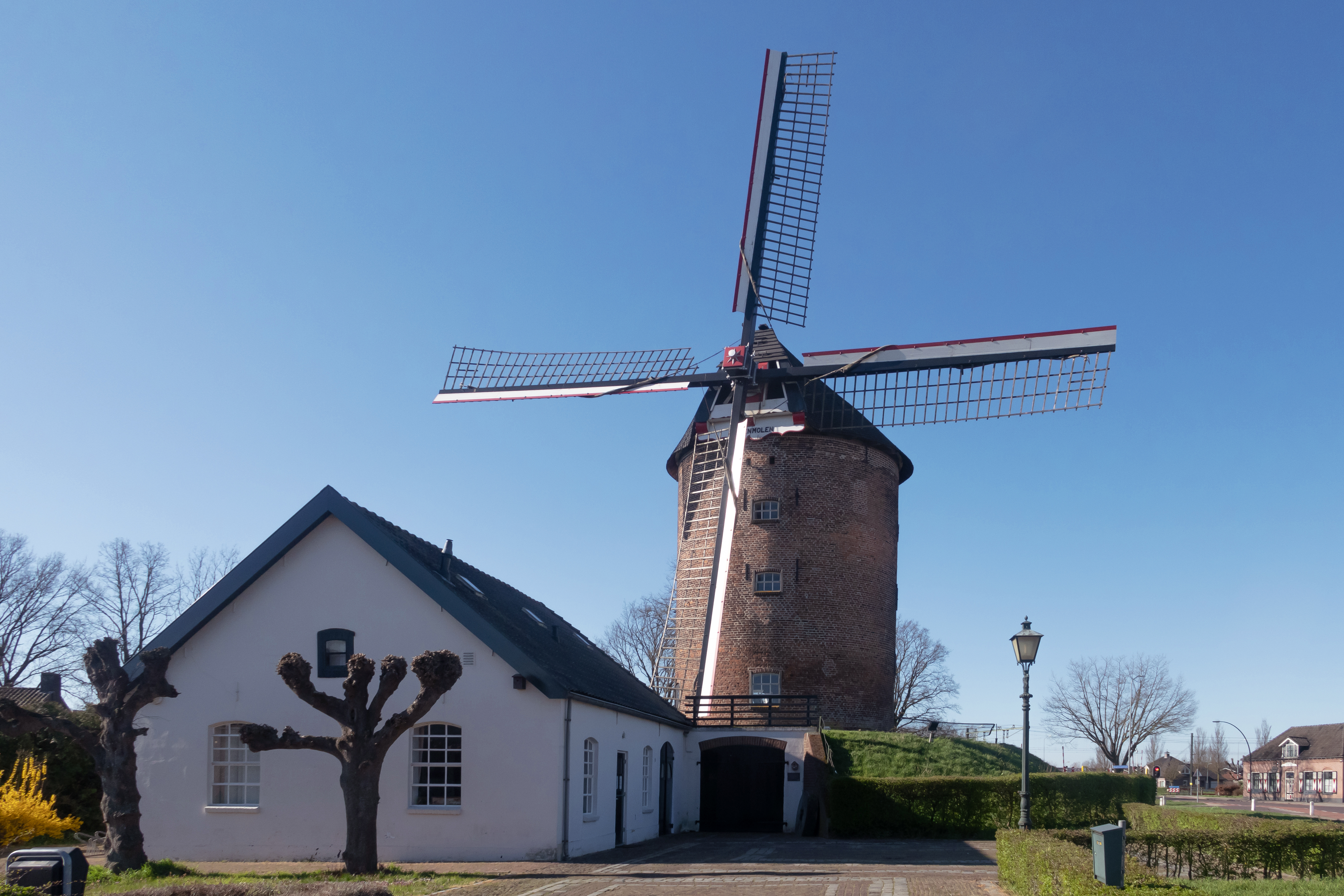
de Buitenmolen

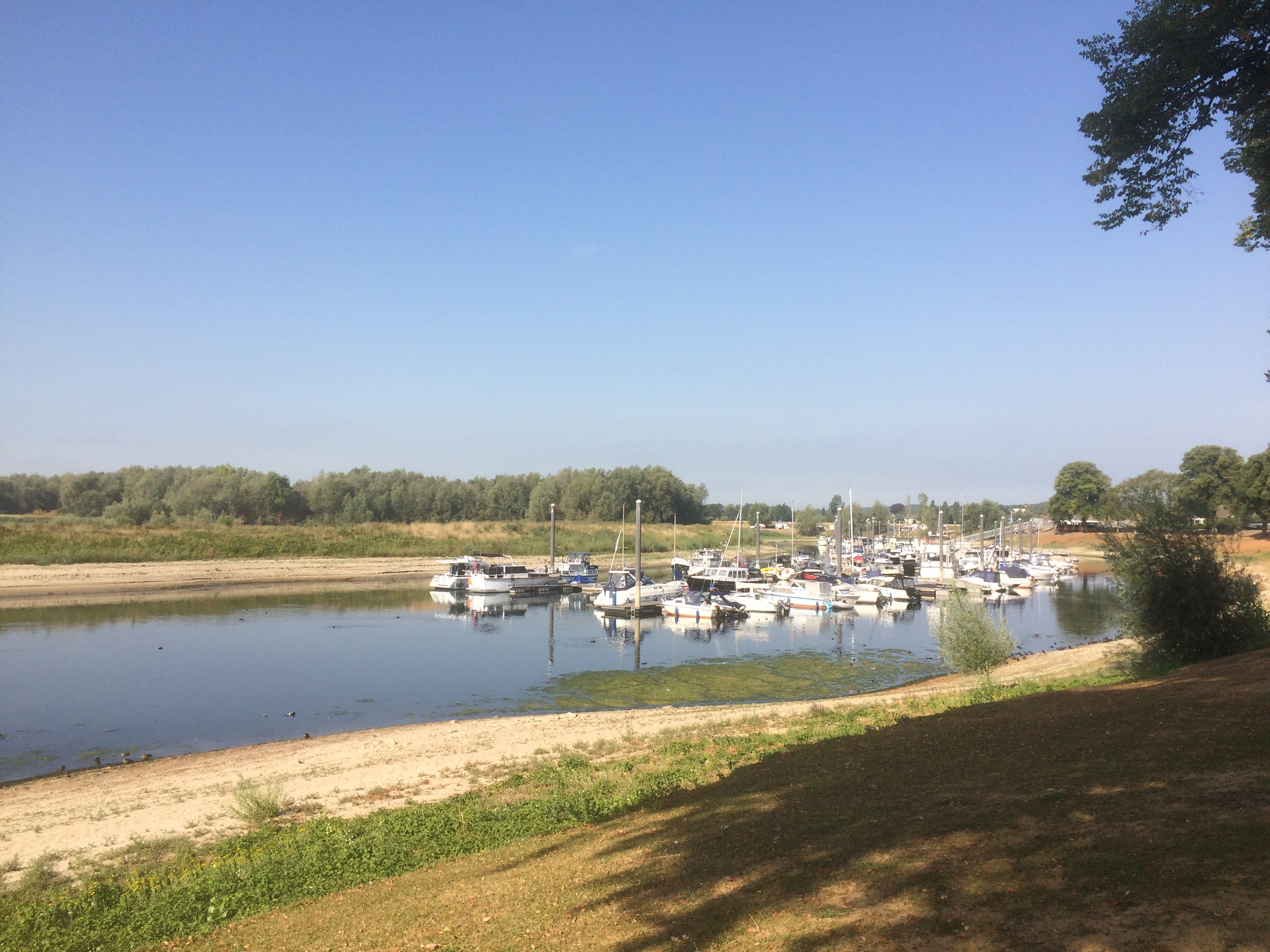
Rhederlaag, tourist harbour

== See also ==
- Veldhuizen, Gelderland
