= List of Rijksmonuments in Gelderland =

This is a list of rijksmonuments in Gelderland that have articles on the English language Wikipedia.

== A ==
Rijksmonument	Type	Location	Description	Photo
De Drie Waaien, Afferden	Windmill	Afferden	A tower mill built in 1869, restored to working order.	
Schoonoord, Alverna	Windmill	Alverna	A tower mill built in 1887, restored to working order.	
Het Loo Palace	Palace	Apeldoorn	A Dutch Baroque palace built in 1686, Now a Rijksmuseum.	
Het Oude Loo	Castle	Apeldoorn	A castle built in the 15th century, used as guest accommodation by the Dutch royal family.	
Koningin Juliana Toren	Tower	Apeldoorn	A tower built in 1910 to celebrate the birth of Prinses Juliana the previous year.	
De Hoop	Windmill	Arnhem	A tower mill built in 1846, restored to working order.	
De Kroon	Windmill	Arnhem	A tower mill built in 1870, restored to working order.	
St Eusebius' Church	Church	Arnhem	A Gothic church built between the mid-15th and mid-16th centuries.	
Agnietenkapel / Waalse kerk	Church	Arnhem	15th-century convent chapel that later became the Walloon church	

== B ==
Rijksmonument	Type	Location	Description	Photo
Batenburg Castle	Castle	Batenburg	A castle built in the 14th century, destroyed in 1795.	
Batenburg Windmill	Windmill	Batenburg	A post mill built in the 18th century.	
De Vrijheid	Windmill	Beesd	A tower mill built in the 18th century, restored to working order.	
De Wielewaal	Windmill	Beneden-Leeuwen	A tower mill built in 1857, restored to working order.	
De Verrekijker	Windmill	Bergharen	A tower mill built in 1904, converted to a holiday cottage.	
De Haag	Windmill	Bergharen	A post mill built in 1704, restored to working order.	
Braamse Molen	Windmill	Braamt	A tower mill built in 1856.	
De Prins Van Oranje	Windmill	Bredevoort	A tower mill built in 1870, restored to working order.	
De Kempermolen	Windmill	Breedenbroek	A tower mill built in 1882, restored to working order.	
De Prins Van Oranje	Windmill	Buren	A tower mill built in 1716, restored to working order.	

== C ==
Rijksmonument	Type	Location	Description	Photo
De Hoop	Windmill	Culemborg	A tower mill built in 1854, restored to working order.	
Johanna	Windmill	Culemborg	A tower mill built in 1888, restored to working order.	

== D ==
Rijksmonument	Type	Location	Description	Photo
Deelen Air Base	Airfield	Deelen	A military airfield established in 1913.	
Teunismolen	Windmill	De Heurne	A smock mill built in 1822, restored to working order	
De Vlinder	Windmill	Deil	A tower mill built in 1913, restored to working order	
Kasteel Middachten	Manor house	De Steeg	A late 17th-century manor house.	
Post office in De Steeg	Post office	De Steeg	A post office built in 1905. Now in use as a delicatessen.	
Aurora	Windmill	Dichteren	A tower mill built in 1870, restored to working order	
Sint Martinus	Windmill	Didam	A tower mill built in 1855, restored to working order	
Martinikerk	Church	Doesburg	A Gothic church built in the 15th century.	
Benninkmolen	Windmill	Doetinchem	A smock mill built in 1921, restored to working order	

== E ==
Rijksmonument	Type	Location	Description	Photo
Concordia	Windmill	Ede	A smock mill built in 1868. In working order.	
De Keetmolen	Windmill	Ede	A smock mill built in 1858.	
Doesburgermolen	Windmill	Ede	A post mill built in the early 17th century. Restored to working order.	
Ede Centrum railway station	Railway station	Ede	A railway station built in 1902.	

== L ==
Rijksmonument	Type	Location	Description	Photo
De Zwaan	Windmill	Lienden	A tower mill dating from 1644. Restored to working order.	

== N ==
Rijksmonument	Type	Location	Description	Photo
Stratemakerstoren	Bastion	Nijmegen	A bastion built in the early 16th century.	

== O ==
Rijksmonument	Type	Location	Description	Photo
Kröller-Müller Museum	Art museum	Otterlo	An art museum holding the second largest collection of paintings by Vincent van Gogh in the Netherlands. The museum has a large collection of sculptures on open-air display.	

== S ==
Rijksmonument	Type	Location	Description	Photo
Bronkhorstermolen	Windmill	Steenderen	A tower mill built in 1844, restored to working order.	

== W ==
Rijksmonument	Type	Location	Description	Photo
Hotel de Wereld	Hotel	Wageningen	A hotel built in 1872. The German forces officially surrendered here on 6 May 1945, marking the end of the German occupation of the Netherlands.	

== Z ==
Rijksmonument	Type	Location	Description	Photo
Grafelijke Korenmolen	Windmill	Zeddam	A tower mill dating from 1441, the oldest windmill in the Netherlands.	
De Buitenmolen	Windmill	Zevenaar	A tower mill dating from the early 16th century.	
