= Millrind =

Iron support for the upper millstone

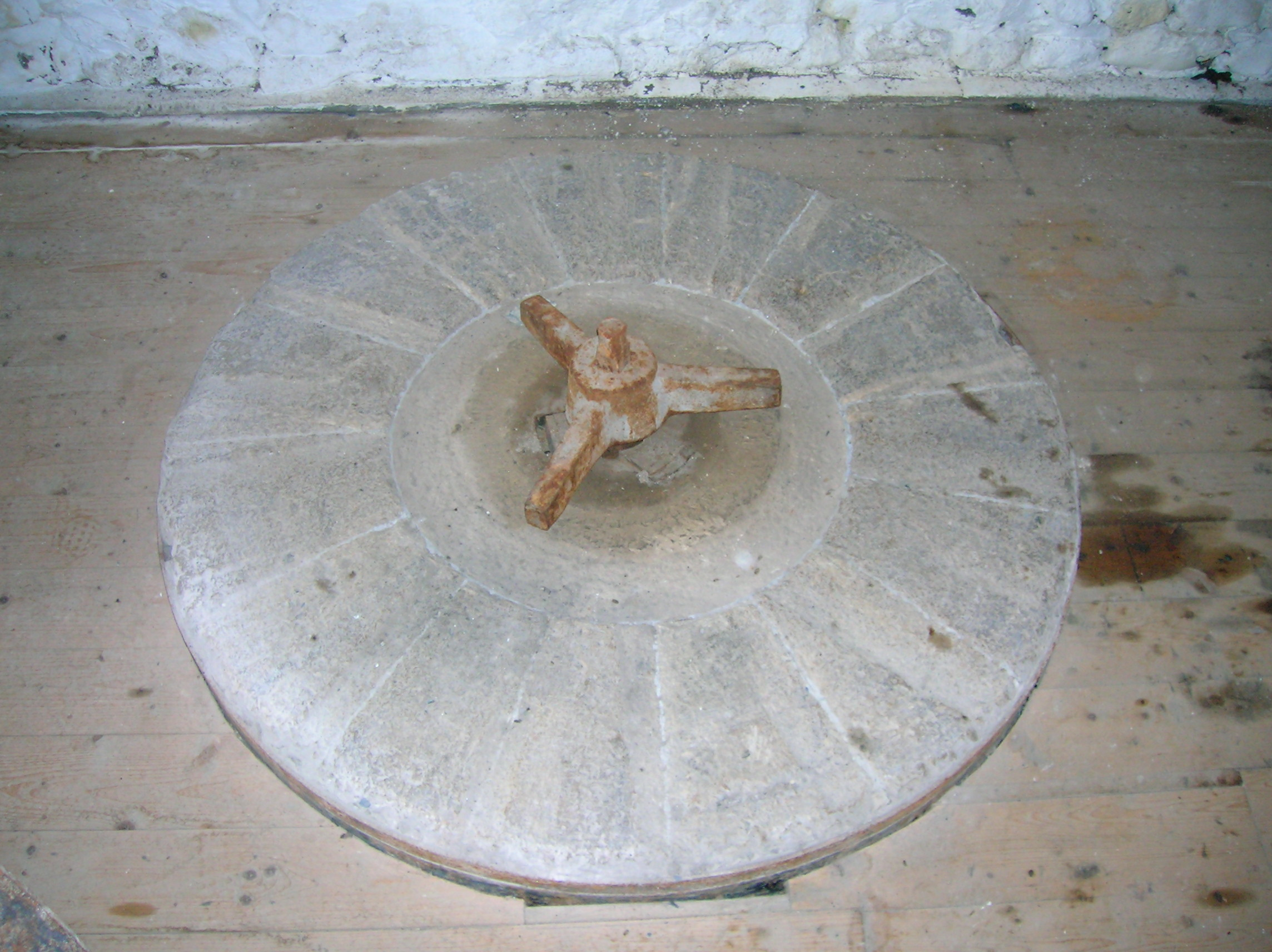
A bedstone and the rind

A millrind or simply rind is an iron support, usually four-armed or cross-shaped, for the upper ("runner") stone in a pair of millstones.

The rind is affixed to the top of the square-section main shaft or spindle and supports the entire weight of the runner stone, which can be as much as several tons. The face of a runner stone usually has a carved depression, called the "Spanish cross", to accommodate the millrind. The rind is necessary because the grain is fed through the runner stone's central hole, so the spindle cannot be inserted through it like a cartwheel on an axle.

== Mechanism ==
A later refinement, replacing the cross, was to mount a mace onto the spindle, which fitted into a gimbal let into the runner stone. The device allowed the runner stone to move in two planes and thus follow the nether (stationary) stone more closely, but great care had to be taken to ensure that its weight was properly balanced. The separation of the nether stone from the runner, controlling the fineness of the grind, was adjusted by the tenter mechanism: a screw jack to raise or lower the bearing carrying the base of spindle.

== In heraldry ==
The millrind occasionally appears as a charge in heraldry, in which it is often known by the French name fer-de-moline ("iron of a mill"). Like real millrinds, the fer-de-moline is highly variable in form. The 16th century writer Bossewell characterized it as a symbol fit for judges and magistrates, who keep men on a straight course just as a millrind does with a runner stone. However it is more often found in canting arms of families with names such as Miller, Milne and Mills and Turner, Turnor and Turnour.

Another charge based on the millrind is the cross moline, which takes the form of a cross with bifurcated ends (sometimes with a pierced centre and sometimes without). In early blazons the term fer-de-moline often refers to the cross moline.

== Gallery ==
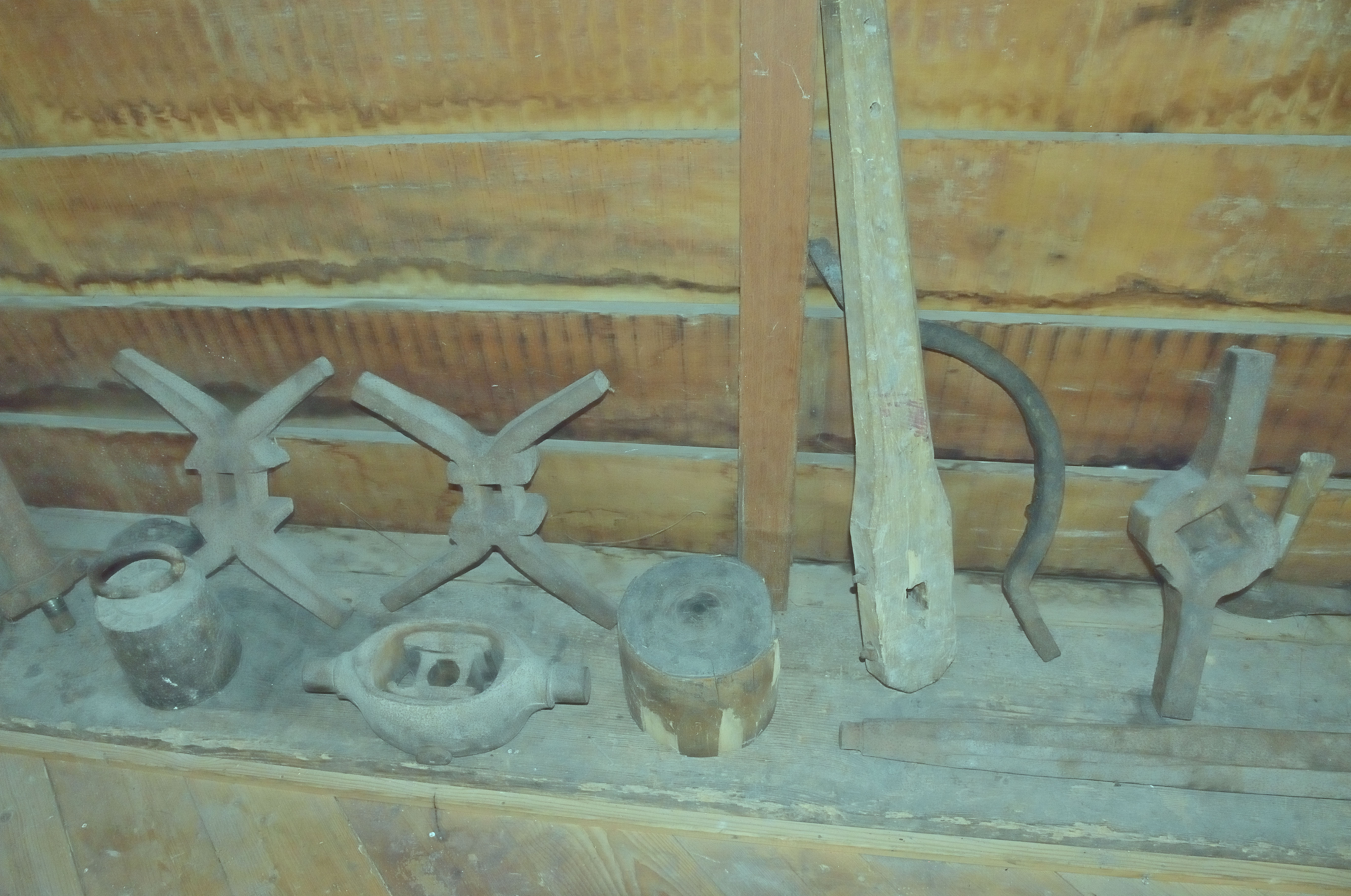
Various millrinds and other mill equipment

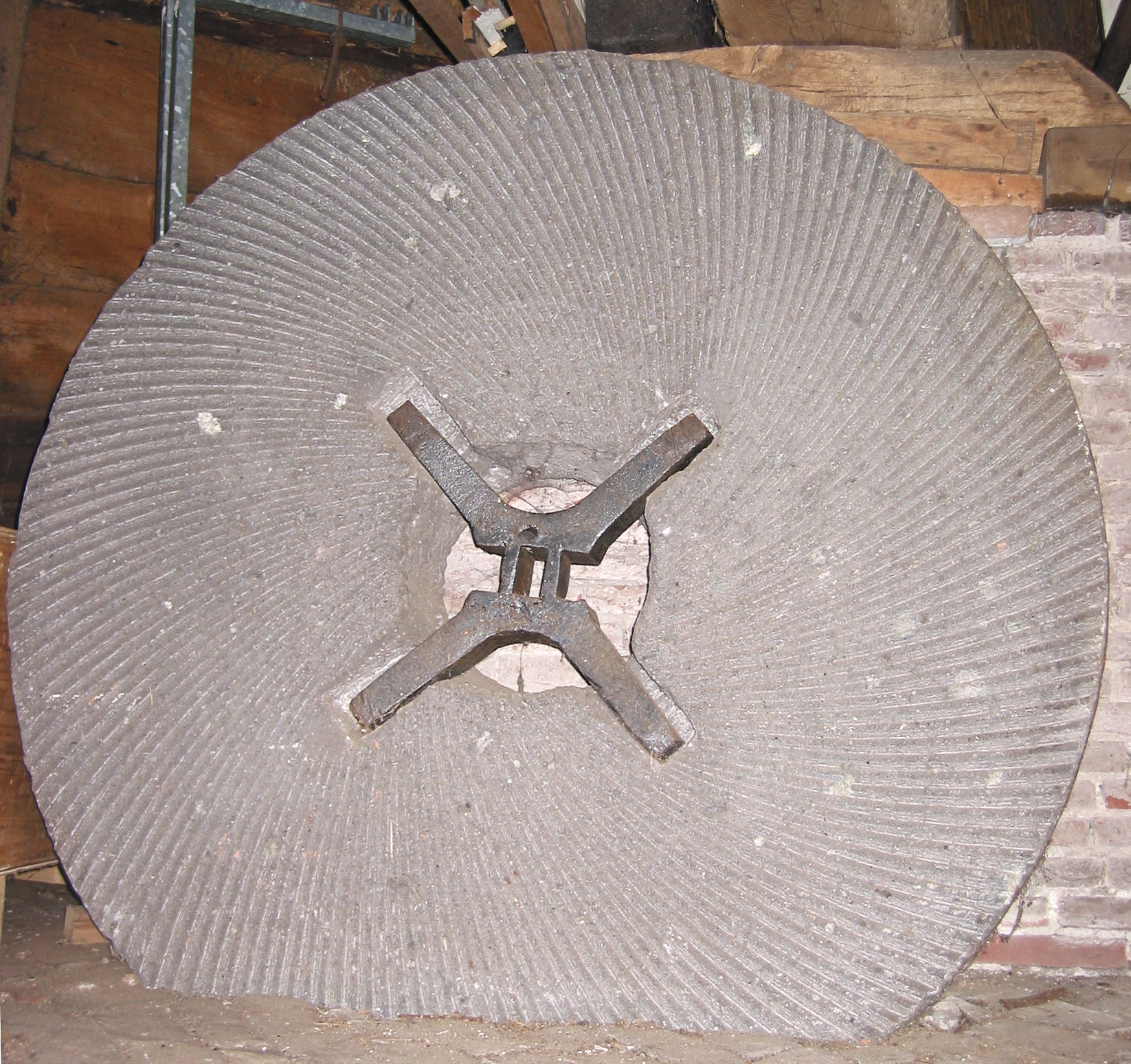
A millstone and rind at the Doesburgermolen in Ede, Netherlands

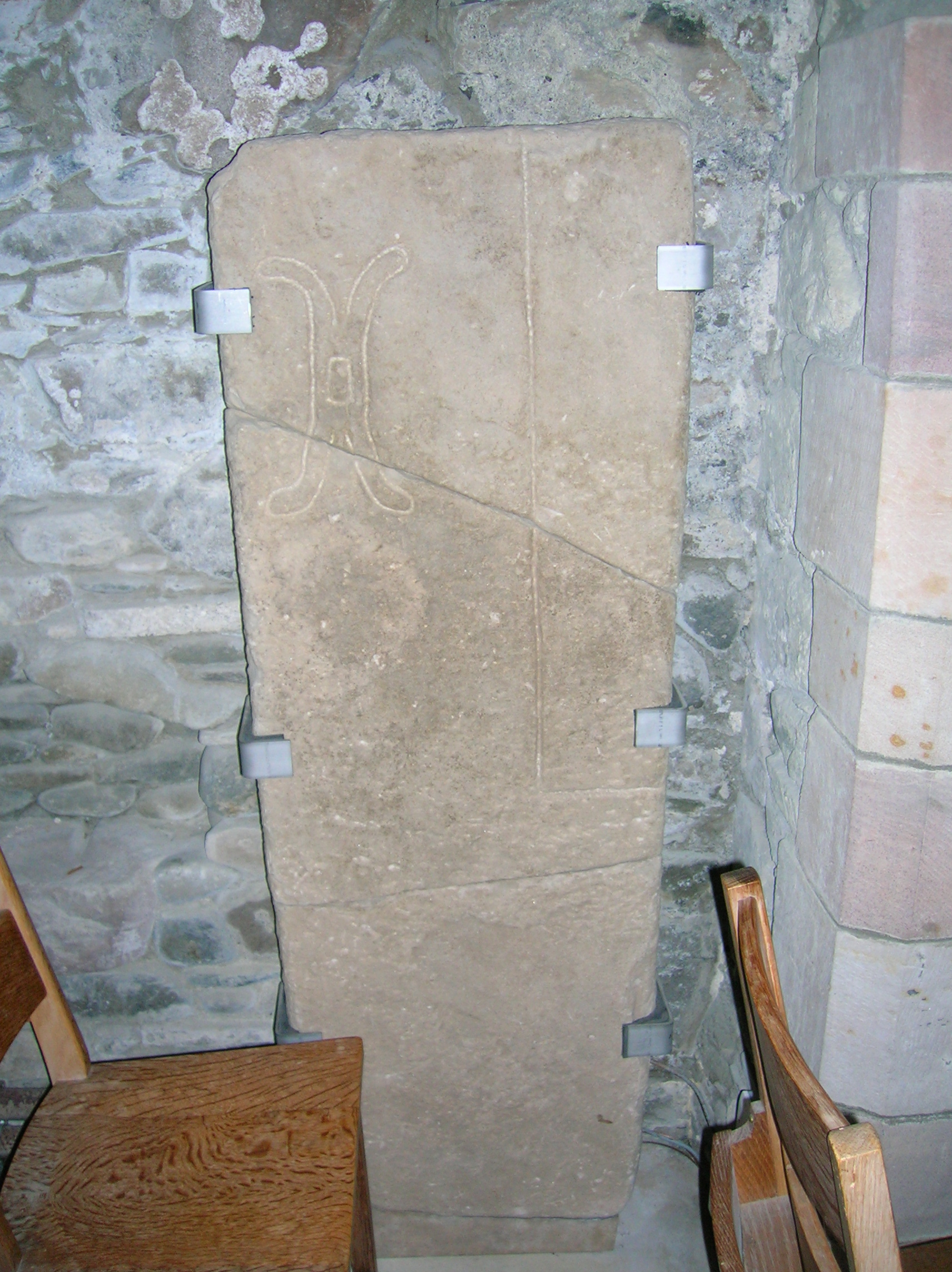
A rind on an early tombstone in Stobo Kirk, Peeblesshire

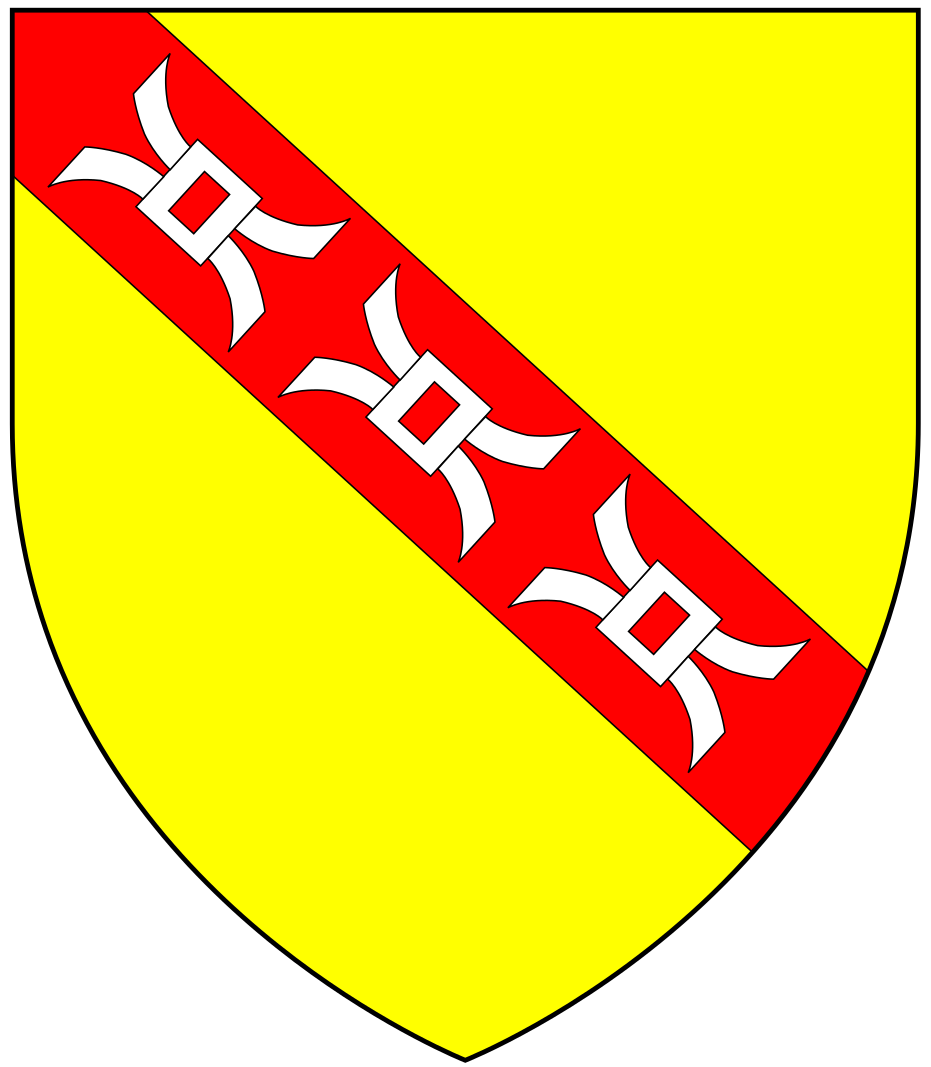
The arms of Speccot, of Speccot, in the parish of Merton, Devon: Or, on a bend gules three millrinds argent

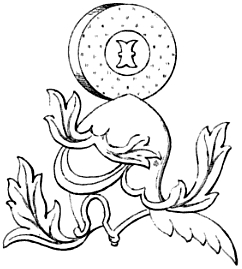
The helmet of John de Lisle, 2nd Baron Lisle (d.1355), as represented on his Garter stall plate, with a millstone and rind as his crest

The arms of Betty Boothroyd, Baroness Boothroyd, with two millrinds

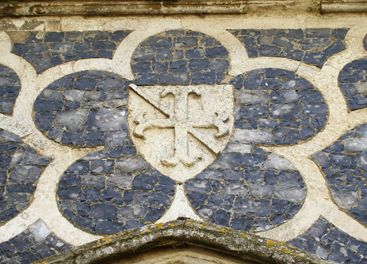
The canting arms of Sir Guy Ferre (d.1323): A fer de moline over all a bendlet, at Butley Priory, Suffolk

A millrind forms the central part of the insignia of the Judge Advocate General's Corps in the U.S. Navy.
