= Afferden =

Afferden may refer to:

- Afferden, Limburg, Netherlands
- Afferden, Gelderland, Netherlands
