= De Verrekijker, Bergharen =

Windmill in Bergharen, Netherlands

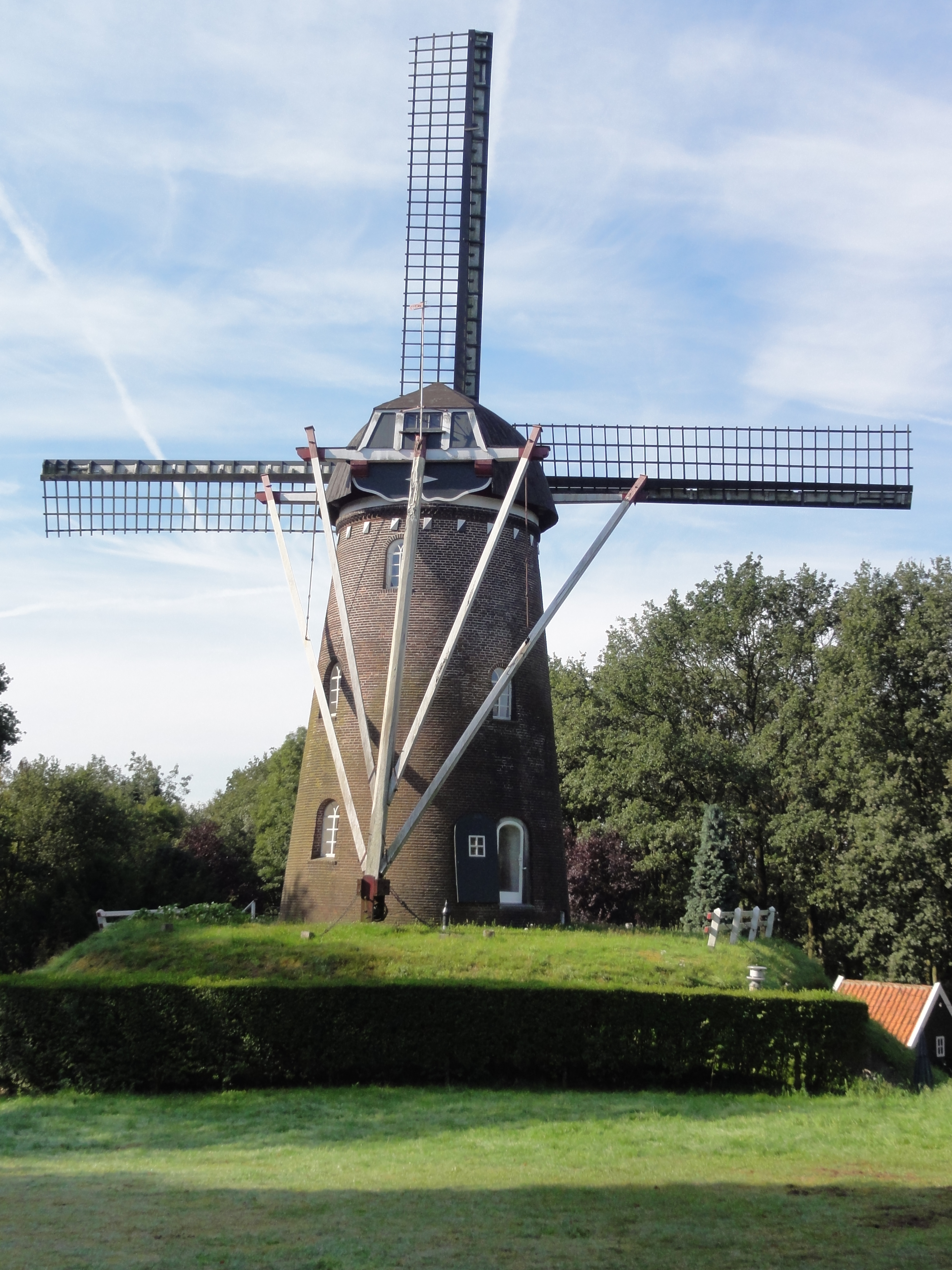
- The mill in September 2010

Origin
- Mill name: De Verrekijker
- Mill location: Molenweg 53, 6617 BC, Bergharen
- Coordinates: 51°51′20″N 5°40′30″E
- Operator(s): Private
- Year built: 1904

Information
- Purpose: Corn mill
- Type: Tower mill
- Storeys: Three storeys
- No. of sails: Four sails
- Type of sails: Common sails
- Windshaft: cast iron
- Winding: Tailpole and winch

De Verrekijker (English: The Spyglass) is a tower mill in Bergharen, Gelderland, Netherlands which was built in 1904 and has been converted to a holiday cottage. The mill is listed as a Rijksmonument.

== History ==
There was a post mill on this site in 1313, when it was sold to the Cistercians of Alten Camp, near Xanten (now in North Rhine-Westphalia, Germany). A post mill was struck by lightning and destroyed on 31 December 1486. It was replaced by a new mill. The mill immediately preceding the current mill was a post mill that was struck by lightning in 1903 and destroyed, but not by fire; the damage done rendered the mill beyond repair.

De Verrekijker was built in 1904 by millwright Willem Coppes of Bergharen. In 1962, the mill was stripped of its machinery and converted to a holiday cottage. The mill can turn in the wind. It is listed as a Rijksmonument, № 9303.

== Description ==
De Verrekijker is what the Dutch call a "Beltmolen". It is a three storey tower mill built on a mound. The cap is covered n dakleer. Winding is by tailpole and winch. The sails are Common sails, which have a span of 25.10 metres (82 ft 4 in). They are carried on a cast iron windshaft which was cast by Merckx in 1897. The windshaft also carries the brake wheel, which has 86 cogs. No other machinery remains.
