= Breedenbroek =

- Village
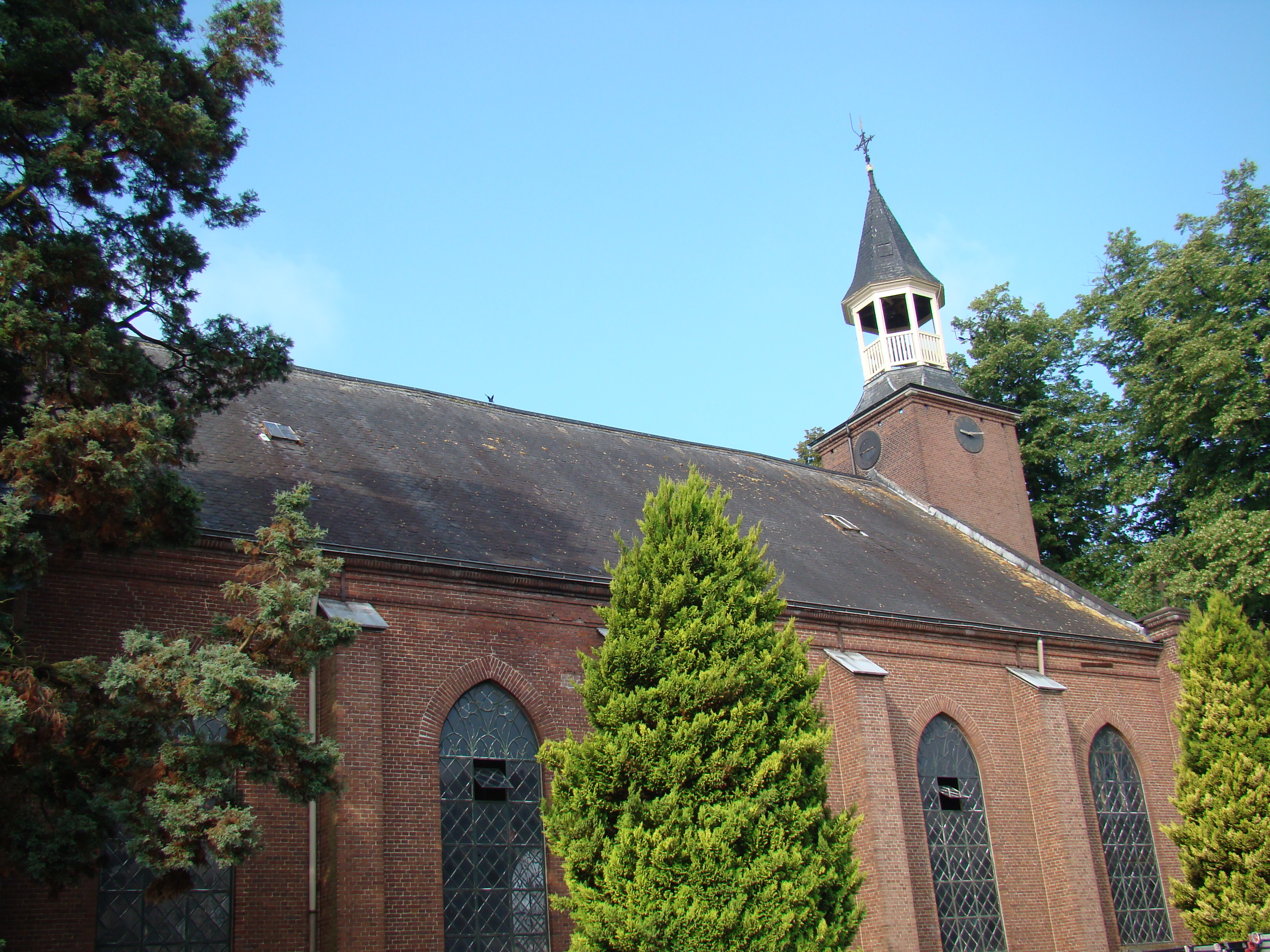
- Roman Catholic church "Saints Peter and Paul"

- Location in the Netherlands Breedenbroek (Netherlands)
- Coordinates: 51.8736°N 6.4711°E
- Country: Netherlands
- Province: Gelderland
- Municipality: Oude IJsselstreek

Area
  - Total: 12.34 km^{2} (4.76 sq mi)
- Elevation: 17 m (56 ft)

Population (2021)
  - Total: 930
  - Density: 75/km^{2} (200/sq mi)
- Time zone: UTC+1 (CET)
  - Summer (DST): UTC+2 (CEST)
- Postal code: 7084
- Dialing code: 0315

Breedenbroek is a Dutch village in the Achterhoek region in the Gelderland province, near the town Dinxperlo, Netherlands. It is located some 3 kilometres from the German border. Since the municipal rearrangement in 2005, Breedenbroek is a part of the municipality of Oude IJsselstreek.

It was first mentioned in 1386 as Bredenbroick, and means "wide swampy land". The land was cultivated during the Middle Ages. The southern part became property of the Lords of Anholt and became known as Klein-Breedenbroek and the main settlement is often called Groot-Breedenbroek. In 1840, it was home to 283 people. The church dates from 1855. In 2015, was decommissioned, and in 2021 the church was transformed into a cultural centre. The grist mill "De Kempermolen" was built in 1882. In 1975, it was in poor condition and restored. In 2002–2003, it was repaired again.

== Gallery ==
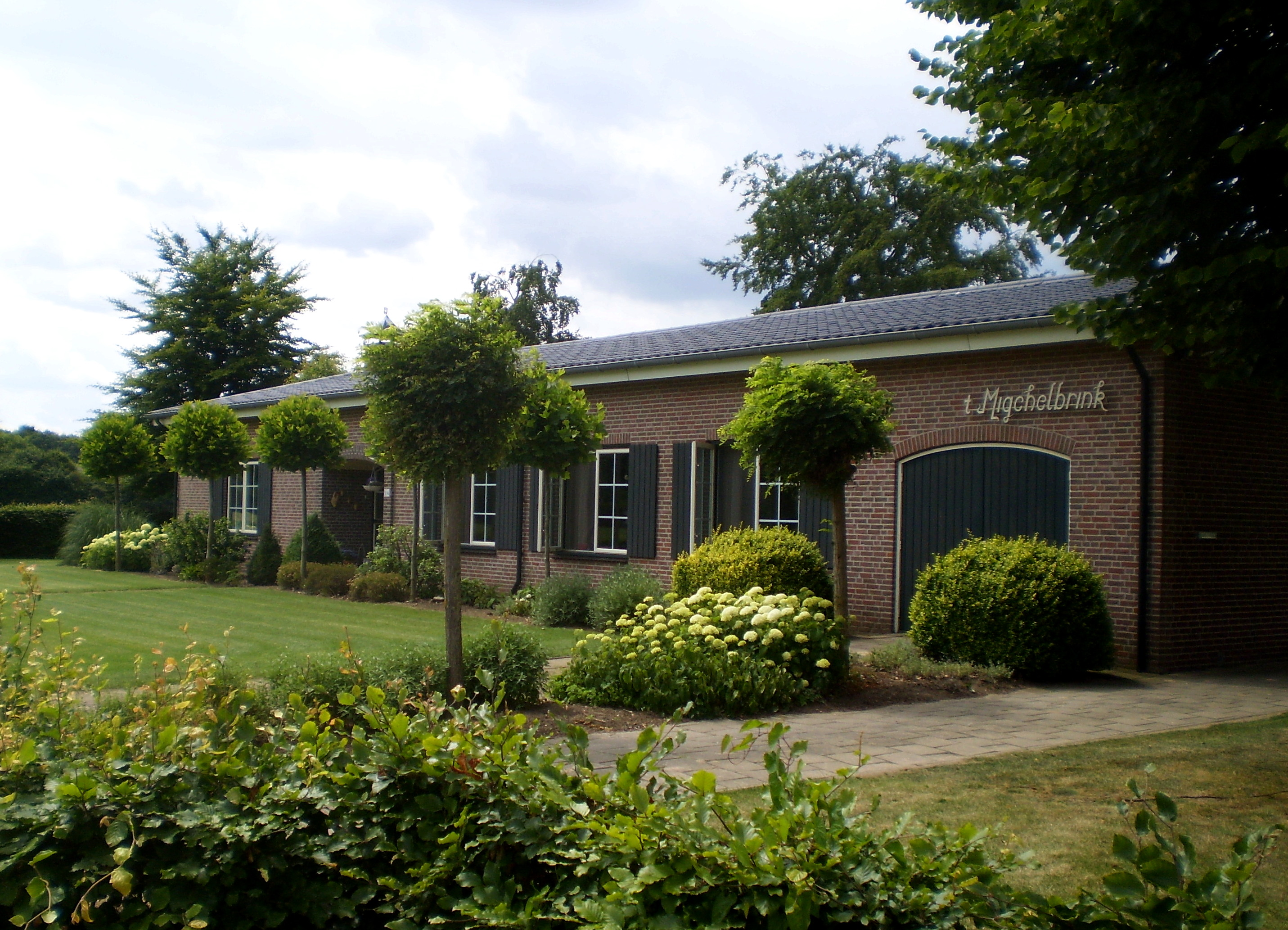
't Migchelbrink

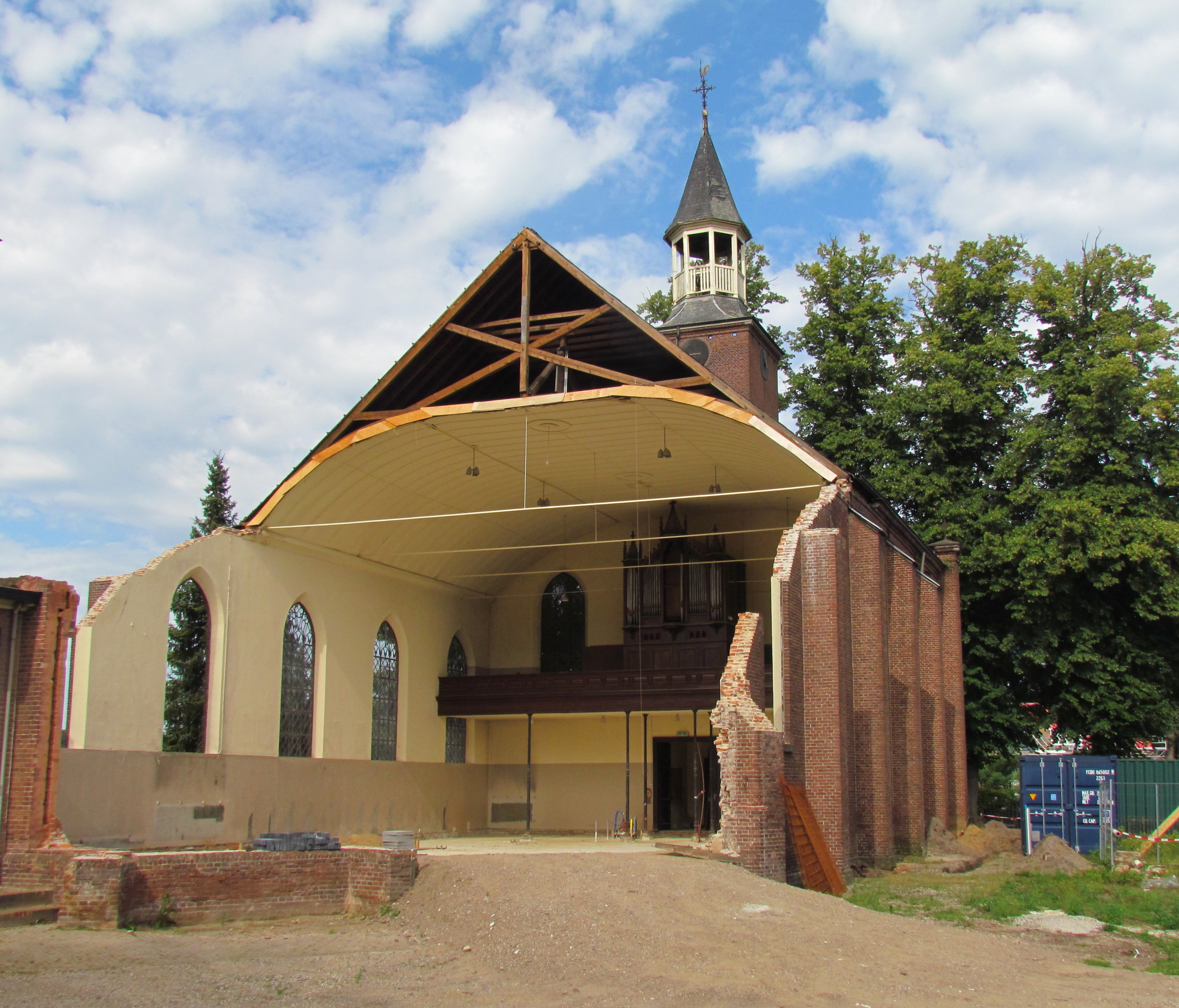
Transformation of the church into a cultural centre

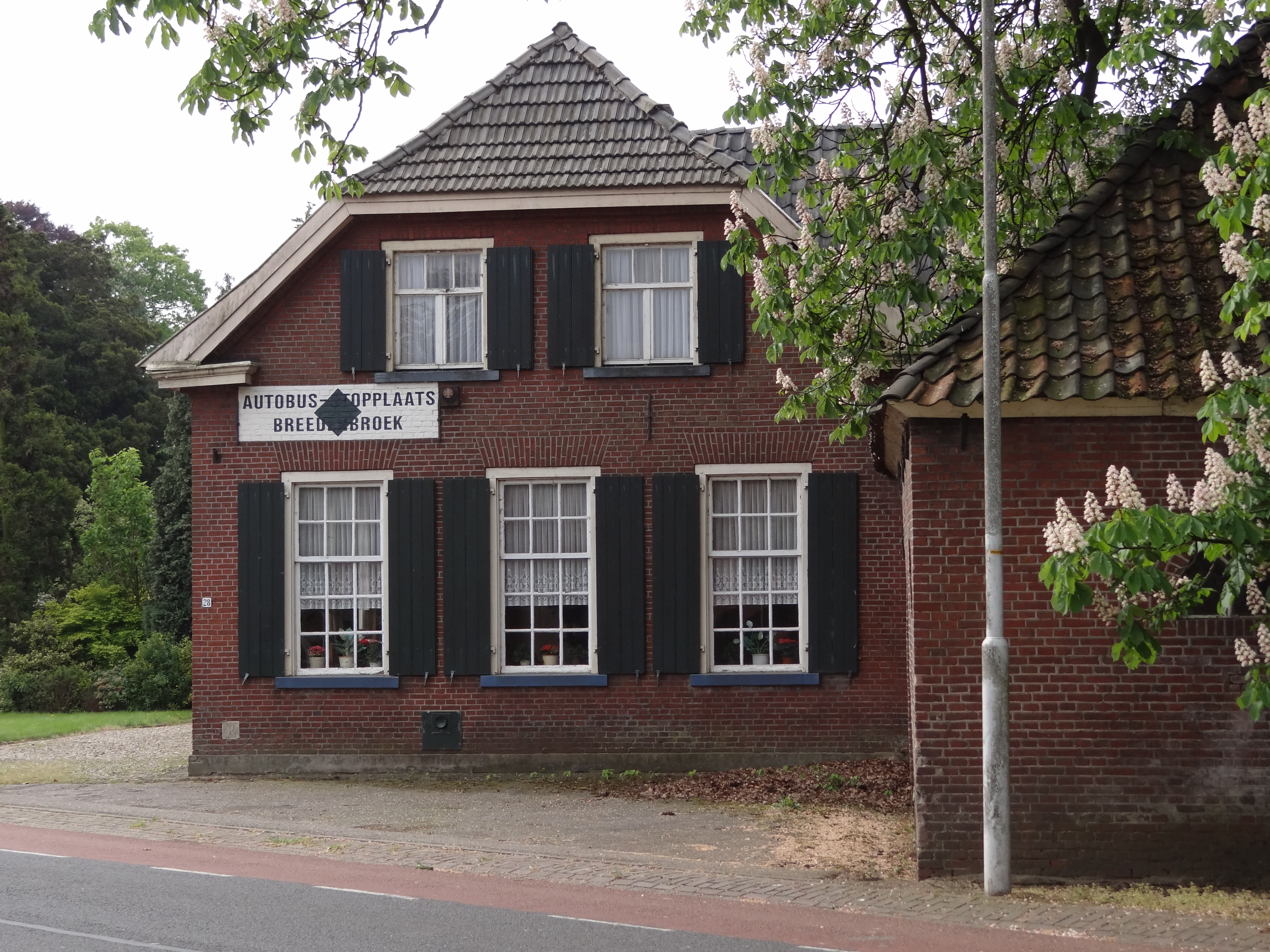
House in Breedenbroek

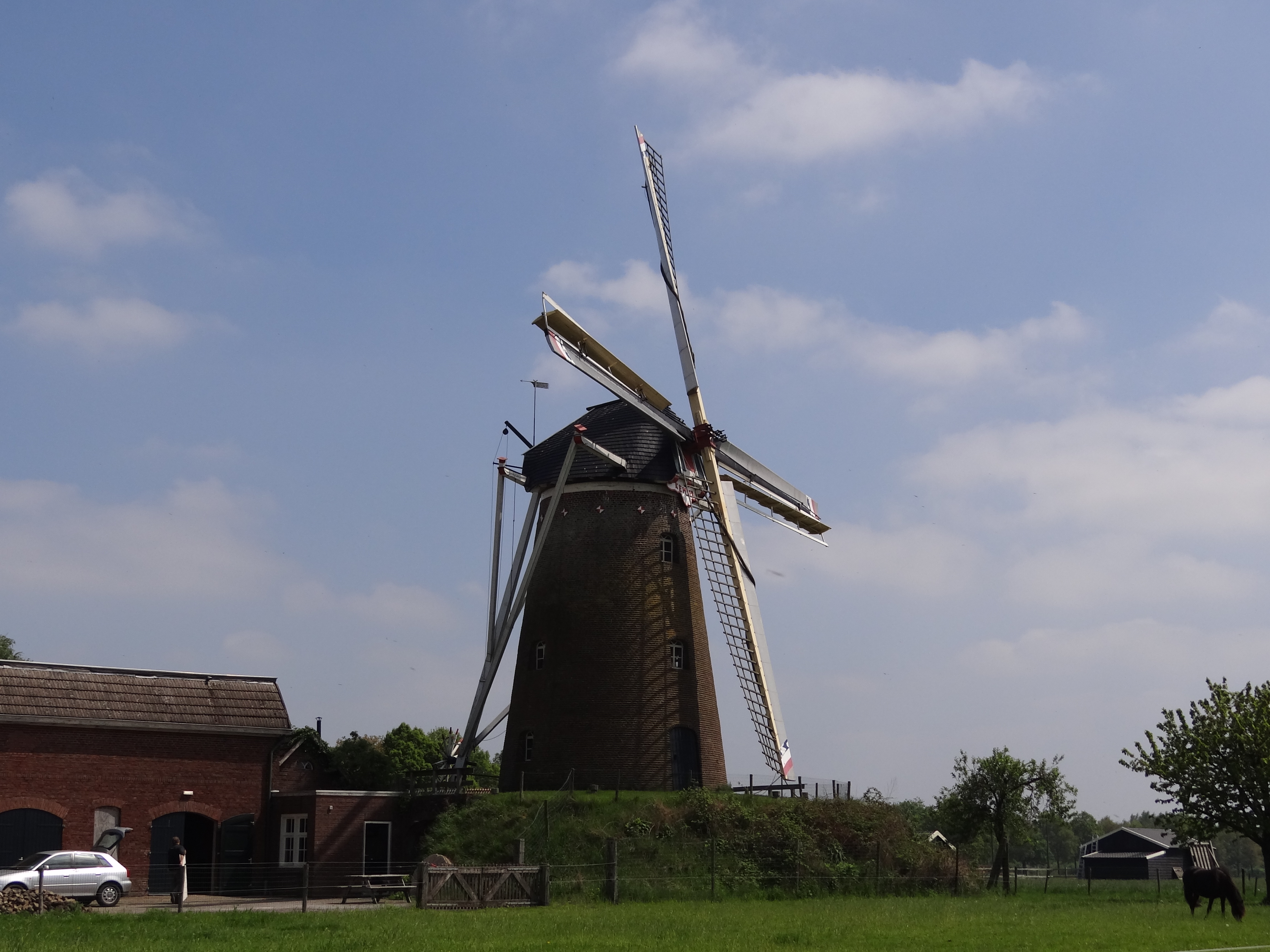
De Kempermolen
