= De Kempermolen, Breedenbroek =

Dutch windmill

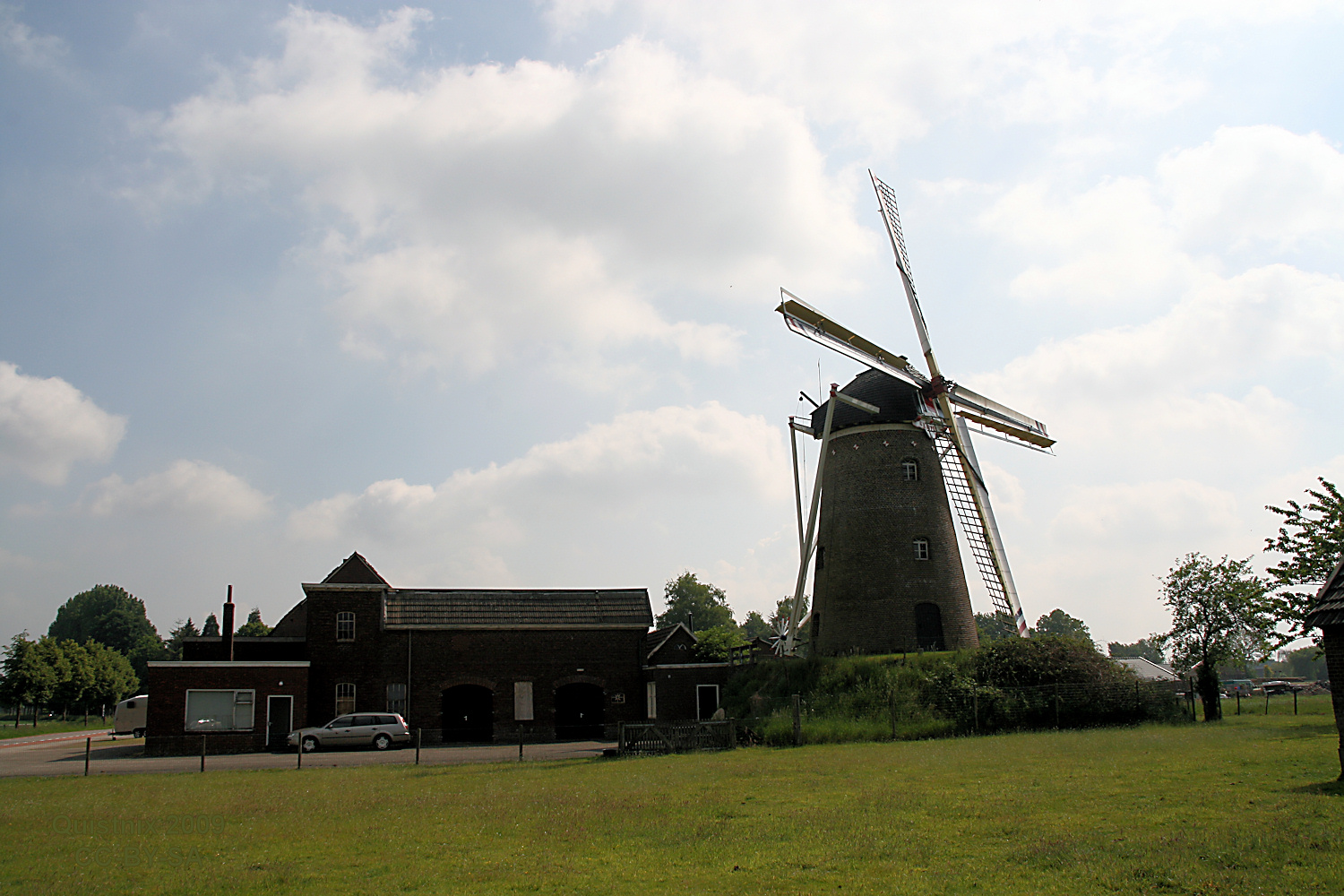
- The mill in May 2008

Origin
- Mill name: De Kempermolen
- Mill location: Molenweg 23, 7084 AV, Breedenbroek
- Coordinates: 51°53′47″N 6°24′14″E
- Operator(s): Stichting Kempermolen
- Year built: 1882

Information
- Purpose: Corn mill
- Type: Tower mill
- Storeys: Three storeys
- No. of sails: Four sails
- Type of sails: One pair Common sails with Van Bussel system on leading edges, one pair Ten Have sails
- Windshaft: cast iron
- Winding: Tailpole and winch
- No. of pairs of millstones: One pair
- Size of millstones: 1.40 metres (4 ft 7 in) diameter

De Kempermolen is a tower mill in Breedenbroek, Gelderland, Netherlands which was built in 1882 and has been restored to working order. The mill is listed as a Rijksmonument.

== History ==
De Kempermolen was built in 1882 by millwright Kreeftenburg of Varsseveld, Gelderland for Johan Kemper. In 1890, a steam mill was built next to the windmill. The steam engine was replaced by a diesel engine c.1901. During the liberation of the Netherlands at the end of World War II, the mill was damaged by a hand grenade. The mill was fitted with a pair of Ten Have sails in 1948. It ceased working by wind in 1959 and only the power driven mill was used from this date. The mill was restored in 1975, and was worked occasionally afterwards. The mill remained in the Kemper family until 2000, when it was sold to the Stichting Kempermolen. A further restoration in 2002-03 followed the breakage of a sailstock. De Kempermolen is listed as a Rijksmonument, № 16067.

== Description ==
De Kempermolen is what the Dutch call a "Beltmolen". It is a three storey tower mill built into a mound which is 3.15 metres (10 ft 4 in) high. There is no stage, the sails reaching almost down to ground level. The cap is covered in oak shingles. Winding is by tailpole and winch. The sails are a pair of Common sails, fitted with the Van Bussel system on their leading edges, and a pair Ten Have sails. They have a span of 23.00 metres (75 ft 6 in). They are carried on a cast iron windshaft, which was cast by the IJzergieterij De Prins van Oranje, The Hague, South Holland in 1873. The windshaft also carries the brake wheel, which has 60 cogs. This drives a wallower with 31 teeth, which is situated at the top of the upright shaft. At the bottom of the upright shaft is the great spur wheel, which has 78 cogs. This drives a pair of 1.40 metres (4 ft 7 in) Cullen stones via a lantern pinion stone nut with 22 staves.

== Public access ==
De Kempermolen is open by appointment.
