= Braamt =

- Village
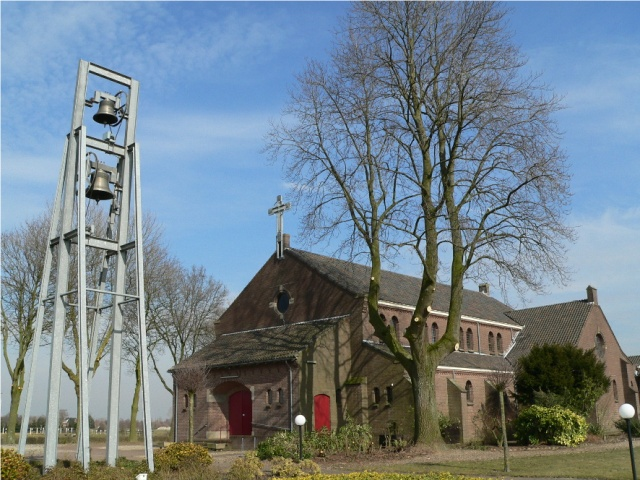
- Church with bell tower

- Flag

- Location in the Netherlands Braamt (Netherlands)
- Coordinates: 51.92393°N 6.26440°E
- Country: Netherlands
- Province: Gelderland
- Municipality: Montferland

Area
  - Total: 8.19 km^{2} (3.16 sq mi)
- Elevation: 12 m (39 ft)

Population (2021)
  - Total: 1,560
  - Density: 190/km^{2} (493/sq mi)
- Time zone: UTC+1 (CET)
  - Summer (DST): UTC+2 (CEST)
- Postal code: 6941
- Dialing code: 0316

Braamt is a village in the municipality of Montferland in the province of Gelderland, the Netherlands.

== History ==
It was first mentioned in 1241 as Brameth, and means "place where blackberries grow". De Kemnade is a havezate near Braamt on the Oude IJssel. The estate was first mentioned in 1418, and the tower dates from the 16th century. In 1840, it was home to 292 people. In 1918, a school was built and the church dates from 1950.

The Braamse Molen is a wind mill from 1856. In the 1990s, it was in very poor condition. It was purchased in 2017, and in 2021 the restoration of the wind mill commenced.

== Gallery ==
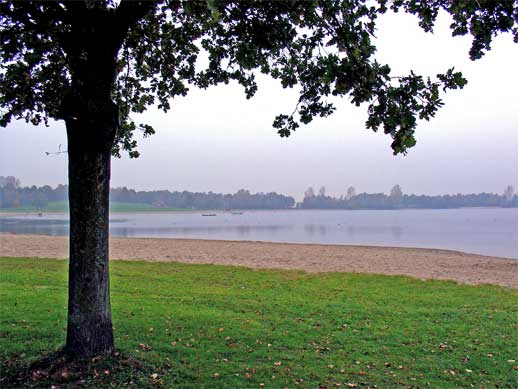
Stroomboek

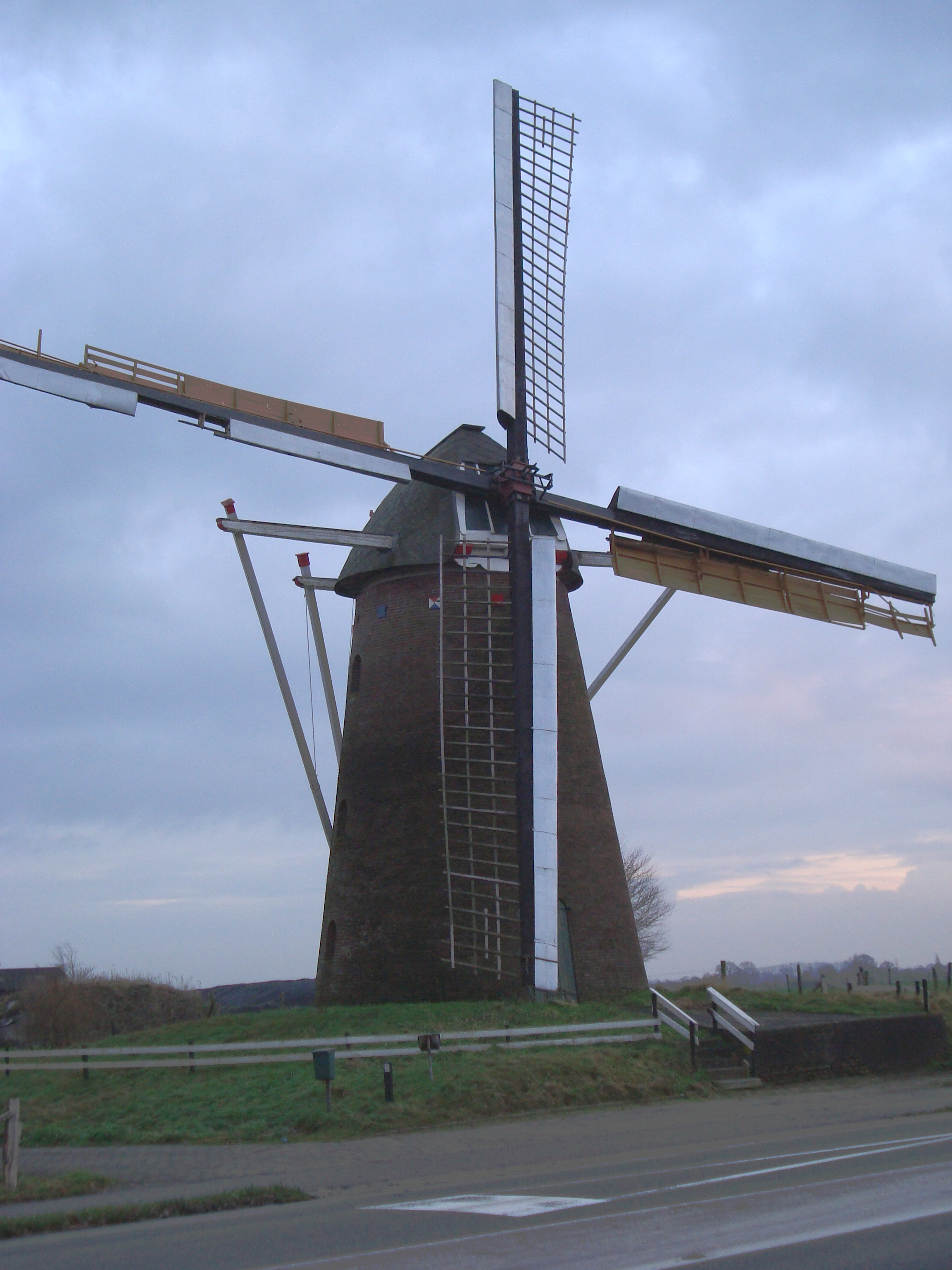
Braamse Molen

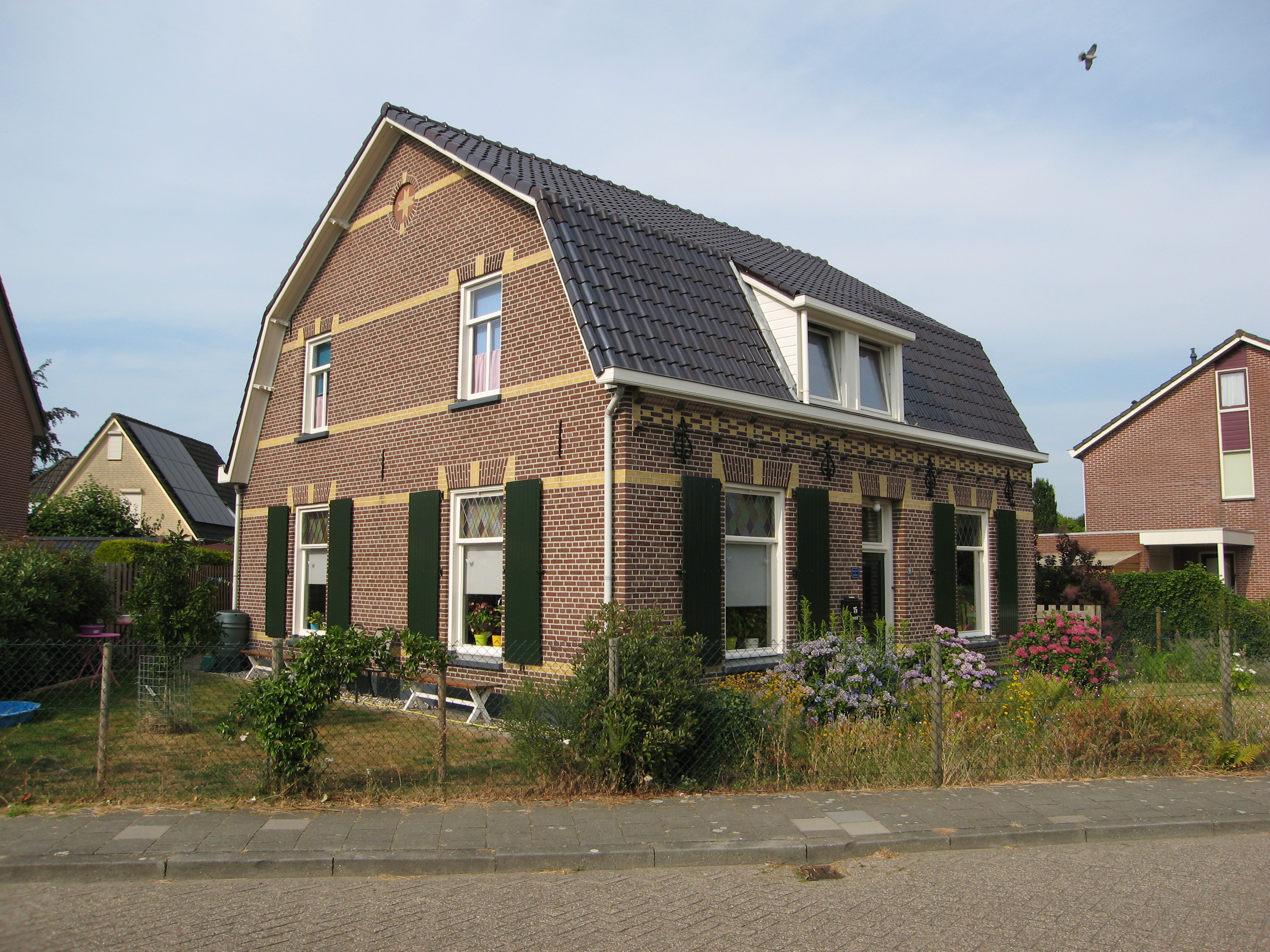
House in Braamt
