= Braamse Molen, Braamt =

Dutch windmill

Braamse Molen, Braaamt
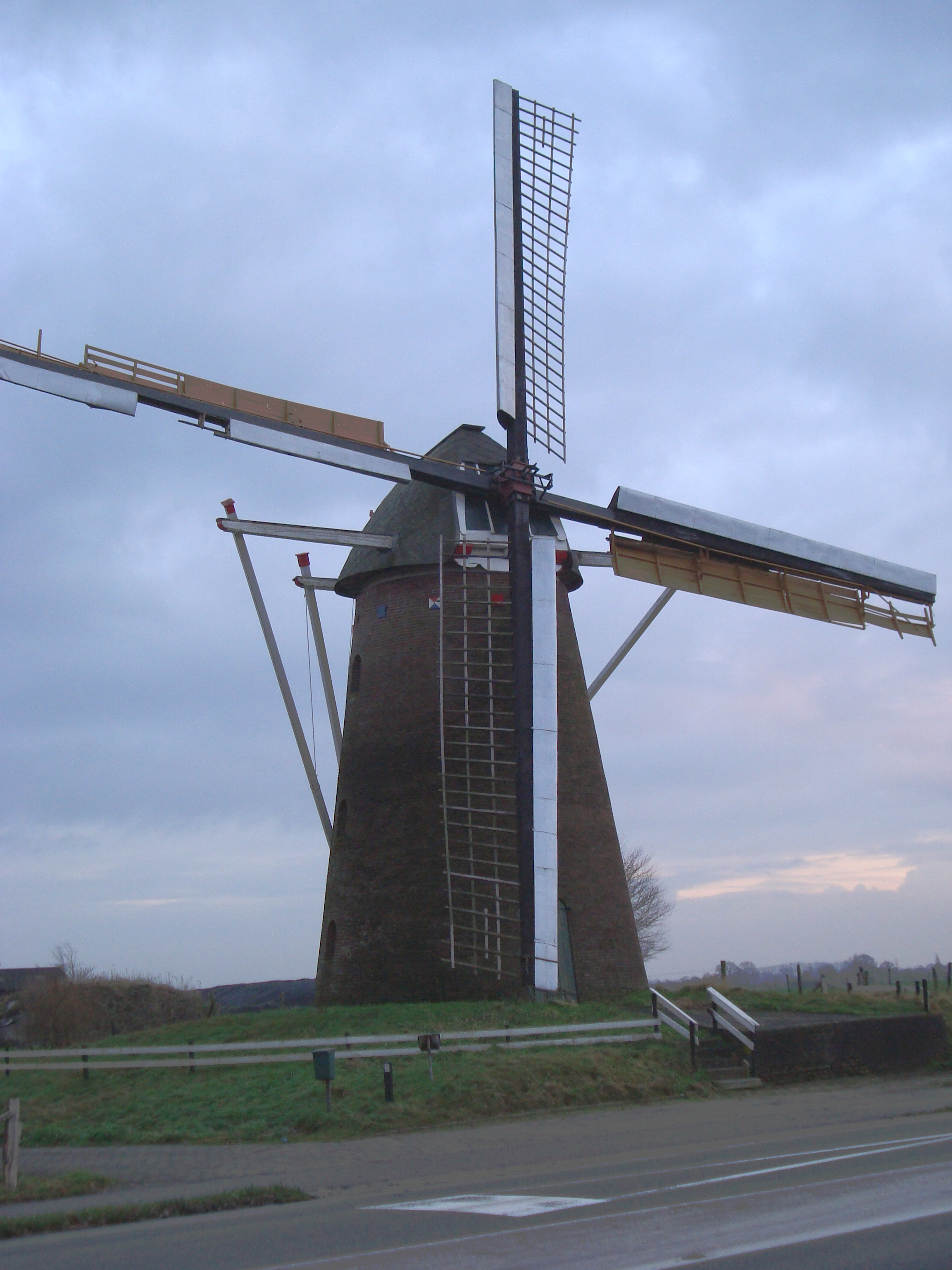
- The mill in December 2010

Origin
- Mill name: Braamse Molen; Koenders Möl
- Mill location: Zeddamseweg 5, 7047 CW, Braamt
- Coordinates: 51°55′16″N 6°16′07″E
- Operator(s): private
- Year built: 1856

Information
- Purpose: Corn mill
- Type: Tower mill
- Storeys: Three storeys
- No. of sails: Four sails
- Type of sails: One pair Common sails with Van Bussel system on leading edges, one pair Beckers sails with Van Bussel system on leading edges
- Windshaft: Cast iron
- Winding: Tailpole and winch
- No. of pairs of millstones: One pair
- Size of millstones: 1.50 metres (4 ft 11 in) diameter
- Other information: One of only two mills in the Netherlands fitted with Beckers sails

The Braamse Molen or Koenders Möl is a tower mill in Braamt, Gelderland, Netherlands which was built in 1856. One of only two mills in the Netherlands fitted with Beckers sails, the mill is listed as a Rijksmonument.

== History ==
The Braamse Molen was built in 1856 by the millwrights the Gerritsen Brothers, of Keyenborg for J W Kelderman. In 1872, it was sold to W Koenders, remaining in the ownership of the Koenders family as of 2014. The mill was restored in 1964. It was then that the two Beckers sails) were fitted and the Van Bussel system was fitted to the leading edges of all four sails. The mill was worked regularly until 1990. The Braamse Molen and Bernadette, Nieuw-Wehl are the only two mills in the Netherlands fitted with Beckers sails. It is listed as a Rijksmonument, № 9263.

== Description ==
The Braamse Molen is what the Dutch call a "Grondzeiler". It is a three storey tower mill. There is no stage, the sails reaching almost down to ground level. The cap is covered in dakleer. Winding is by tailpole and winch. The sails are a pair of Common sails, fitted with the Van Bussel system on their leading edges, and a pair Becker sails fitted with the Van Bussel system on their leading edges. They have a span of 24.30 metres (79 ft 9 in). They are carried on a cast iron windshaft, which was cast by F J Penn & Compagnie, Dordrecht, South Holland in 1864. The windshaft also carries the brake wheel, which has 53 cogs. This drives a wallower with 27 teeth, which is situated at the top of the upright shaft. At the bottom of the upright shaft is the great spur wheel, which has 78 cogs. This drives a pair of 1.50 metres (4 ft 11 in) diameter French Burr millstones via a lantern pinion stone nut with 25 staves.
