= De Keetmolen, Ede =

Dutch windmill

Coordinates: 52°01′47″N 5°40′14″E

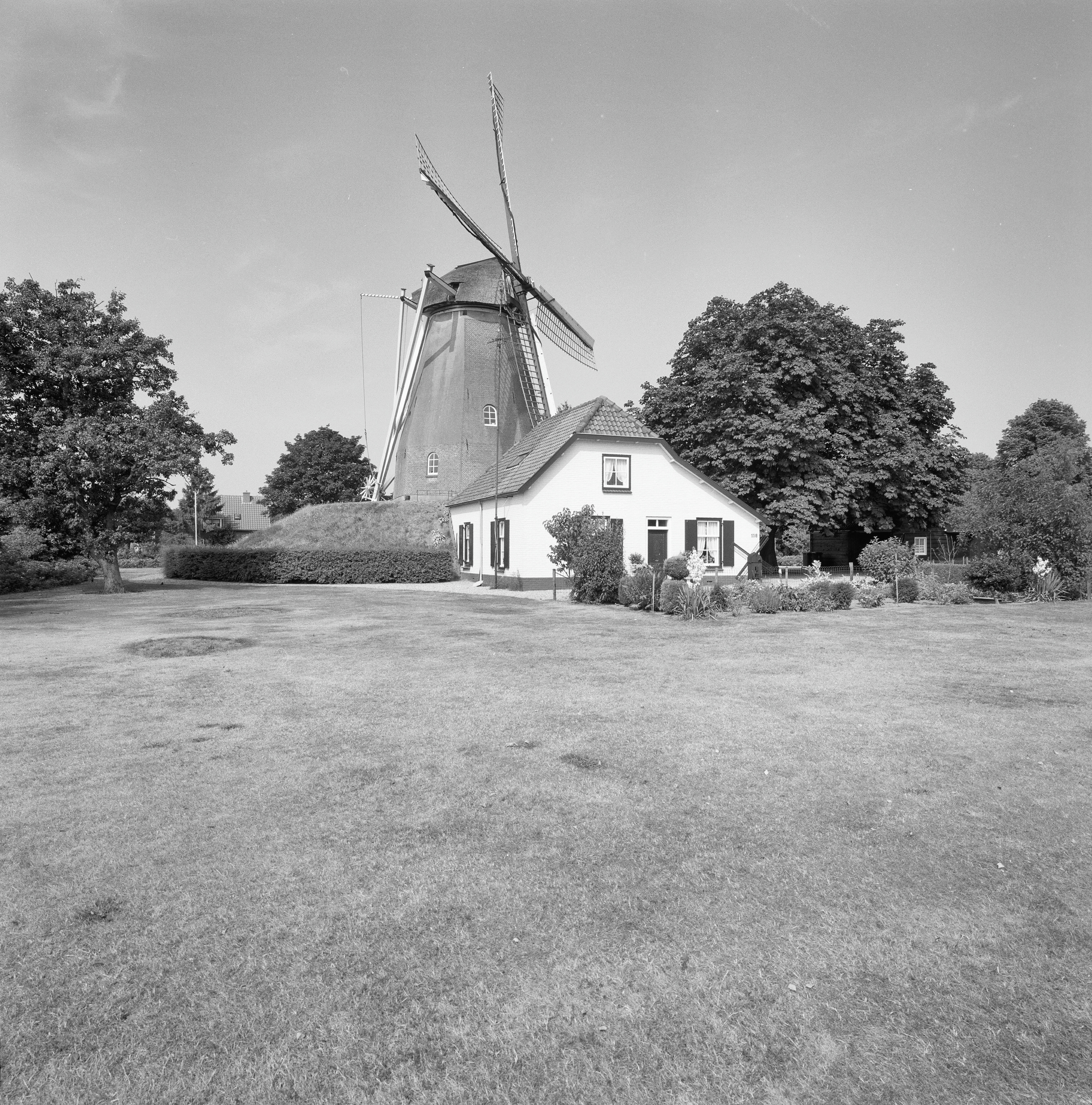
Exterior of the mill, with the "shack" to the right. July 1994.

De Keetmolen (The Shack Mill) is a windmill in Ede, Netherlands. According to the inscription under the sails and the sign at the entrance, the mill was built in 1750. This is incorrect; according to municipal records, the building permit issued in 1856 stated that the mill should be built within two years. The mill was opened in 1858.

The current name of the mill comes from a shack that stood alongside the mill from 1845 to 1878, used in the construction of the Arnhem-Utrecht-Barneveld railway to Ede. The shack later served as a temporary station building.

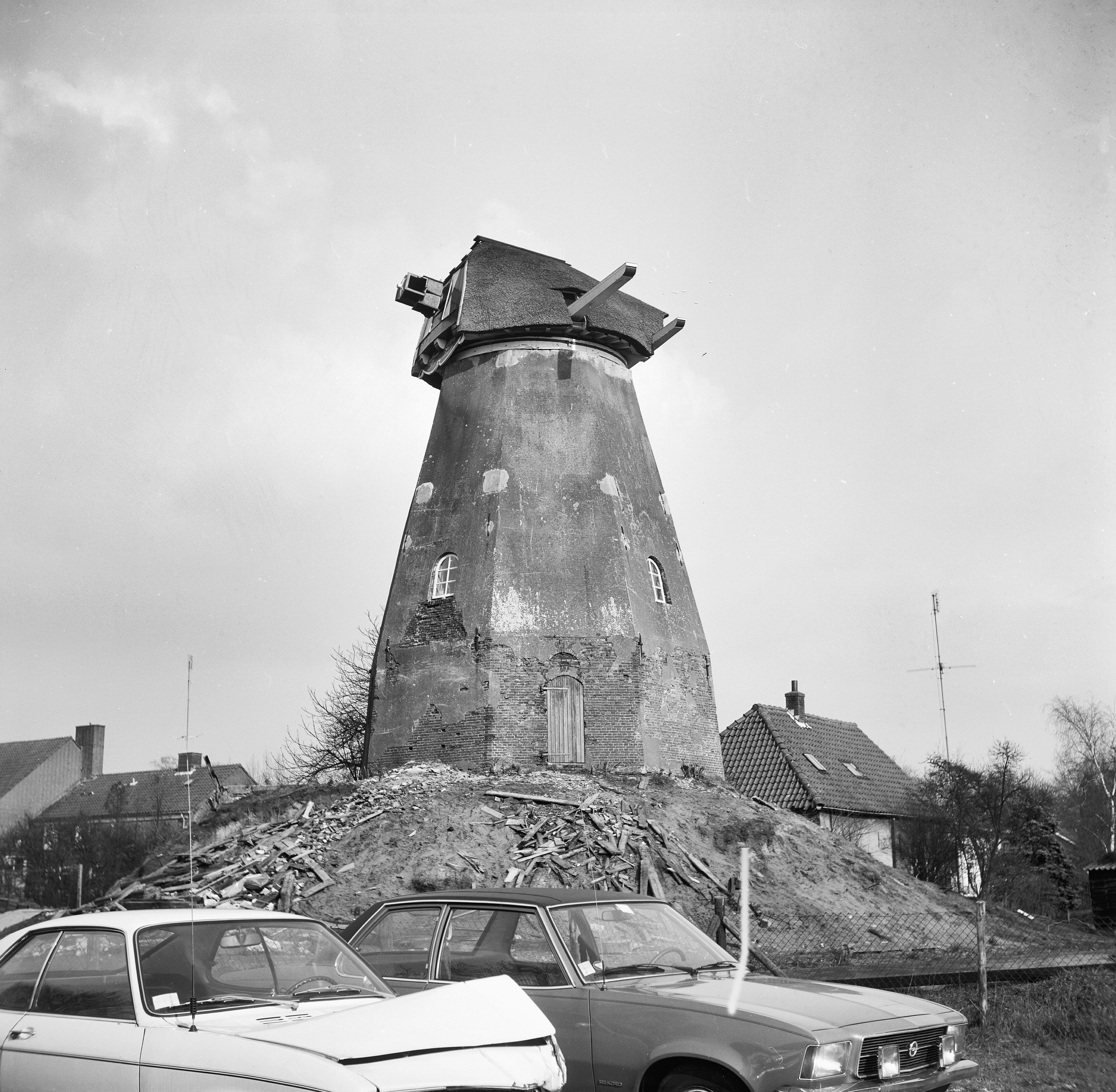
The mill as it existed in 1977.

The windmill is listed as a protected structure under rijksmonument number 14468.

De Keetmolen can in principle be visited every Thursday from 10:00 a.m. to 16:30 p.m.
