= De Drie Waaien, Afferden =

Dutch windmill

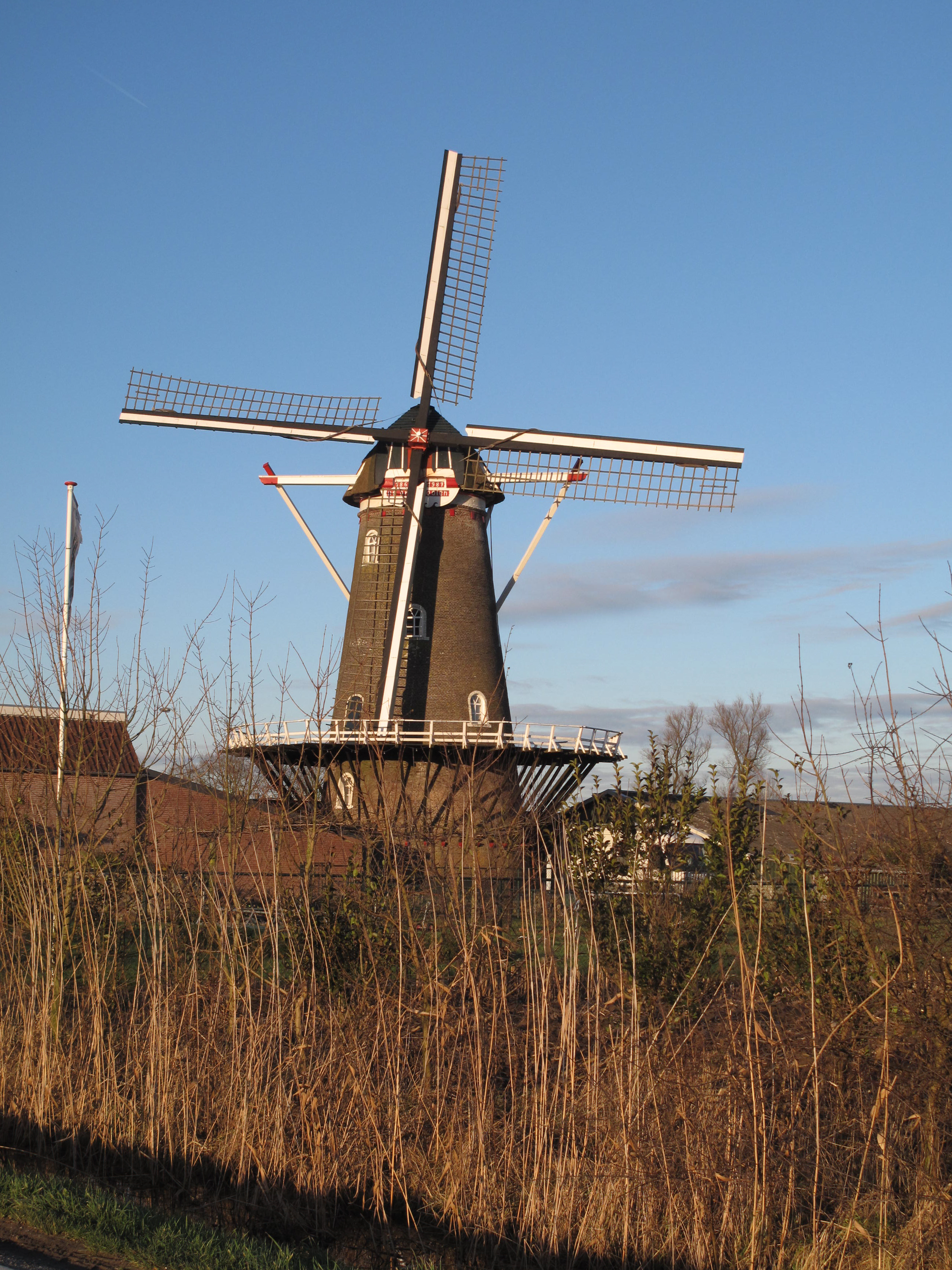
- De Drie Waaien, January 2011

Origin
- Mill name: De Drie Waaien
- Mill location: Molendam 1, 6654 KA, Affelgem
- Coordinates: 51°53′05″N 5°38′43″E
- Operator(s): Gemeente Druten
- Year built: 1869

Information
- Purpose: Corn mill
- Type: Tower mill
- Storeys: Five storeys
- No. of sails: Four sails
- Type of sails: Common sails
- Windshaft: Cast iron
- Winding: Tailpole and winch
- No. of pairs of millstones: Two pairs
- Size of millstones: 1.50 metres (4 ft 11 in) diameter

De Drie Waaien (English: The Three Breaches) is a tower mill in Afferden, Gelderland, Netherlands which was built in 1869 and is in working order. The mill is listed as a Rijksmonument.

== History ==
The first mill on the site was a post mill that was built between 1832 and 1850. It was blown down in a storm in 1868. De Drie Waaien was built in 1869. In 1932, the sails were fitted with the Dekker system on their leading edges. It was the first mill in Gelderland with this feature. The nill was restored in 1965. New sails were fitted that were constructed to the traditional Dutch design. A further restoration was undertaken in 1996. The mill is owned by the Gemeente Druten. It is listed as a Rijksmonument, No. 14155.

== Description ==
De Drie Waaien is what the Dutch describe as a "Ronde stellingmolen". It is a five-storey tower mill, 30 metres (98 ft 5 in) tall. The stage is 5.50 metres (18 ft 1 in) above ground level. The cap is thatched. The mill is winded by tailpole and winch. The sails are Common sails. They have a span of 22.64 metres (74 ft 3 in). The sails are carried on a cast-iron windshaft. The windshaft also carries the brake wheel which has 51 teeth. This drives the lantern pinion wallower (21 staves) at the top of the wooden upright shaft. At the bottom of the upright shaft is the wooden great spur wheel, which has 56 cogs. The great spur wheel drives a pair of 1.50 metres (4 ft 11 in) Cullen millstones and a pair of 1.50 metres (4 ft 11 in) French Burr millstones via lantern pinion stone nuts which have 20 staves each.

== Public access ==
De Drie Waaien is open to the public by appointment.
