= Bergharen =

- Village
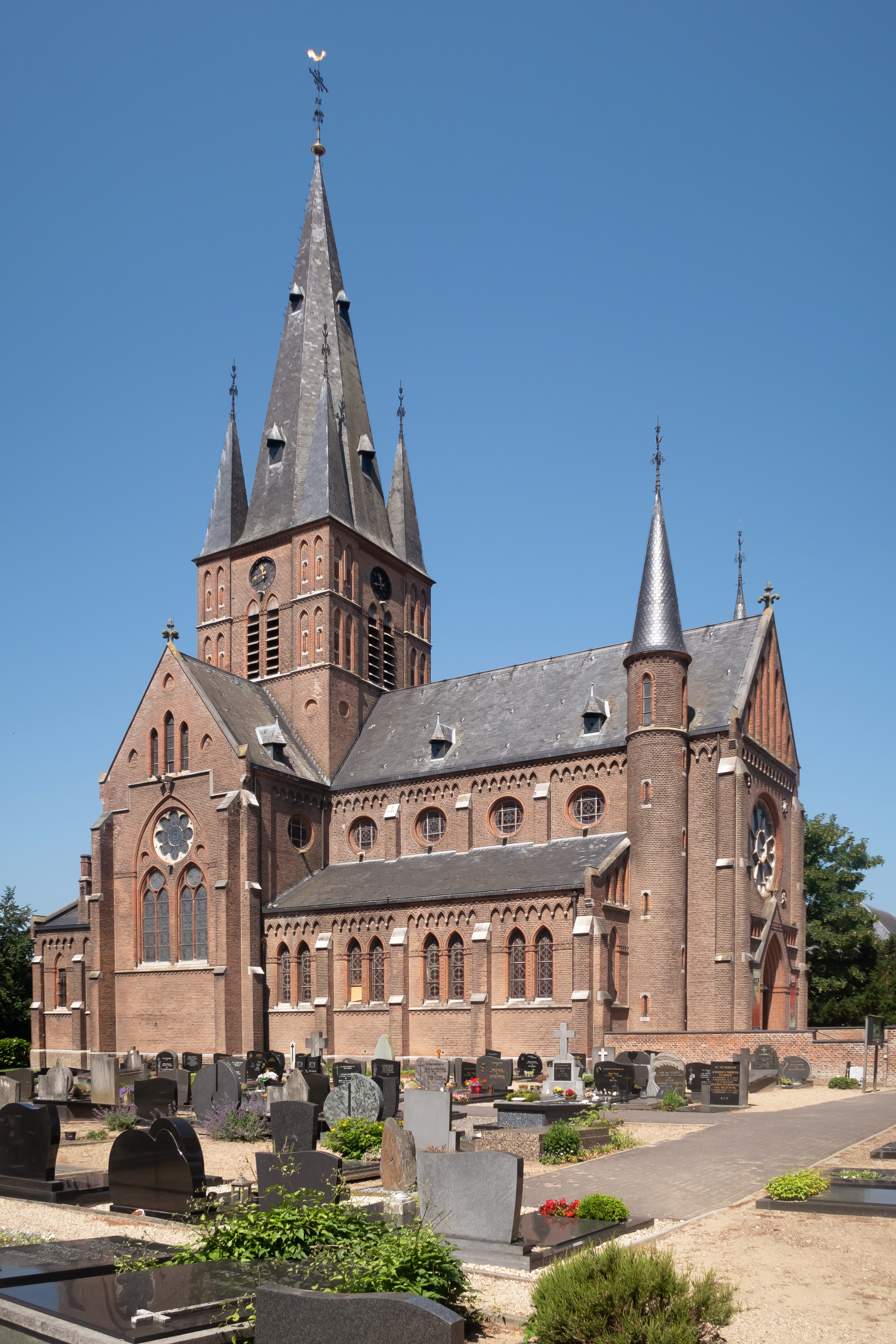
- St Anna Church

- Coat of arms

- Location in the Netherlands Bergharen (Netherlands)
- Coordinates: 51°51′0″N 5°40′8″E
- Country: Netherlands
- Province: Gelderland
- Municipality: Wijchen

Area
  - Total: 0.85 km^{2} (0.33 sq mi)
- Elevation: 8 m (26 ft)

Population (2021)
  - Total: 1,320
  - Density: 1,600/km^{2} (4,000/sq mi)
- Time zone: UTC+1 (CET)
  - Summer (DST): UTC+2 (CEST)
- Postal code: 6617
- Dialing code: 0487

Bergharen (Dutch pronunciation: [bɛr(ə)xˈɦaːrə(n)]) is a village in the Netherlands, in the municipality of Wijchen. It was a separate municipality until 1984. There is a windmill, De Verrekijker, which has been converted to a holiday cottage.

The village was first mentioned in the 12th century as Haren, and means "hill on a sandy ridge". The tower of the Dutch Reformed Church dates from the 14th century and has 12th century elements. The nave was built between 1475 and 1525. The original choir was demolished and replaced in 1826. The Catholic St Anna Church was constructed in 1893. In 1840, it was home to 734 people.

== Gallery ==
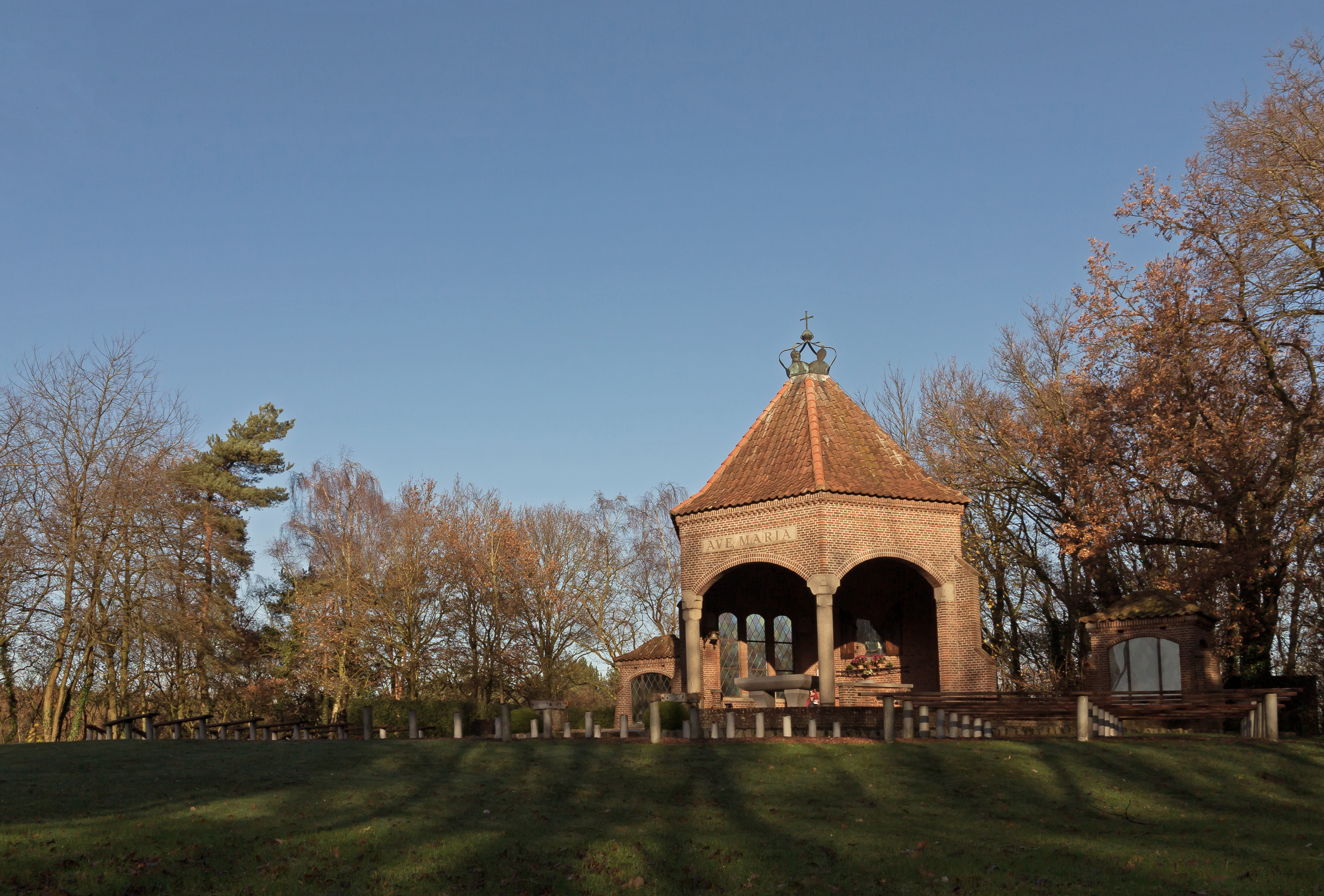
Bergharen, chapel: kapel Onze Lieve Vrouw ter Nood Gods

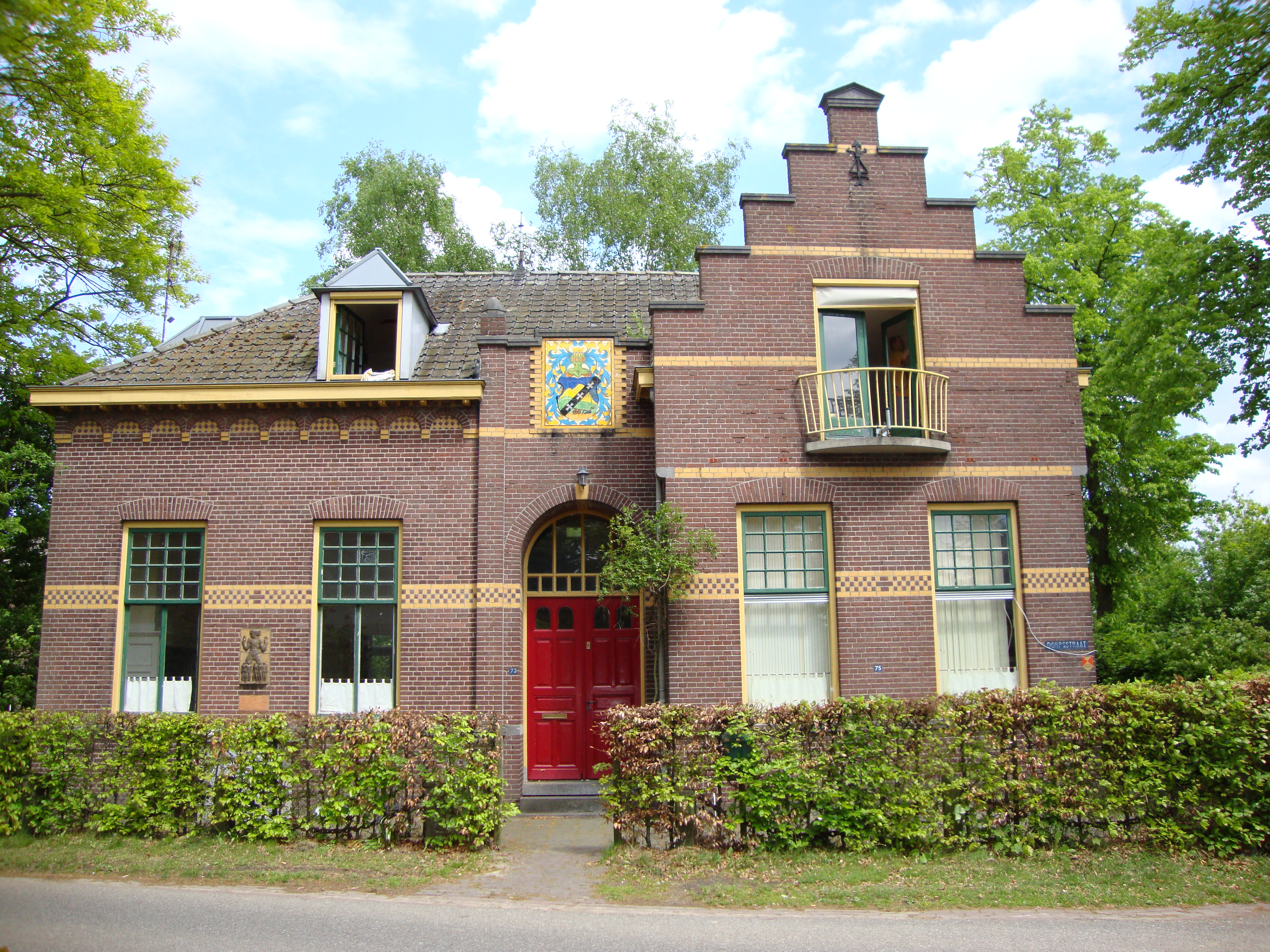
Former town hall

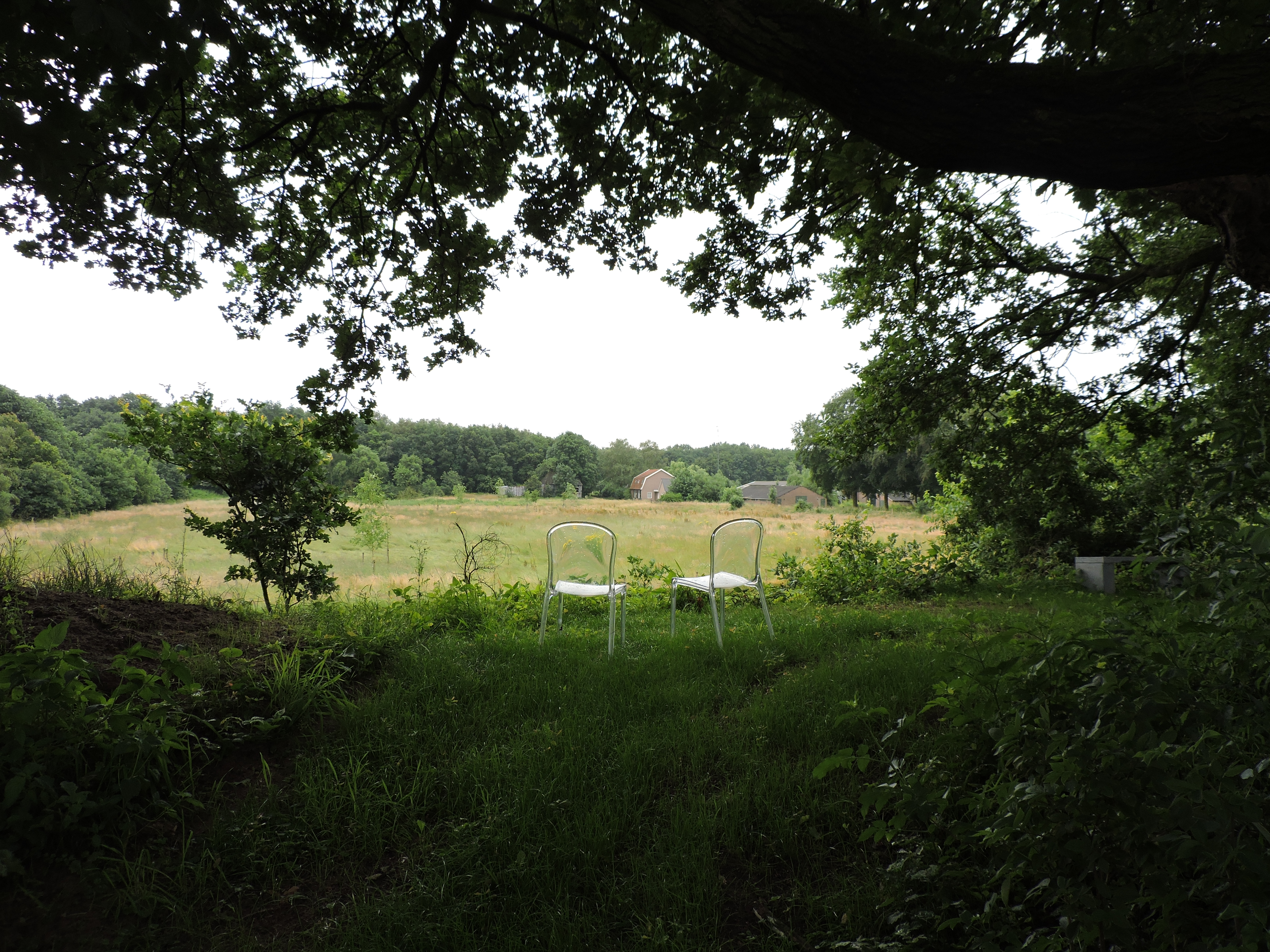
Landscape

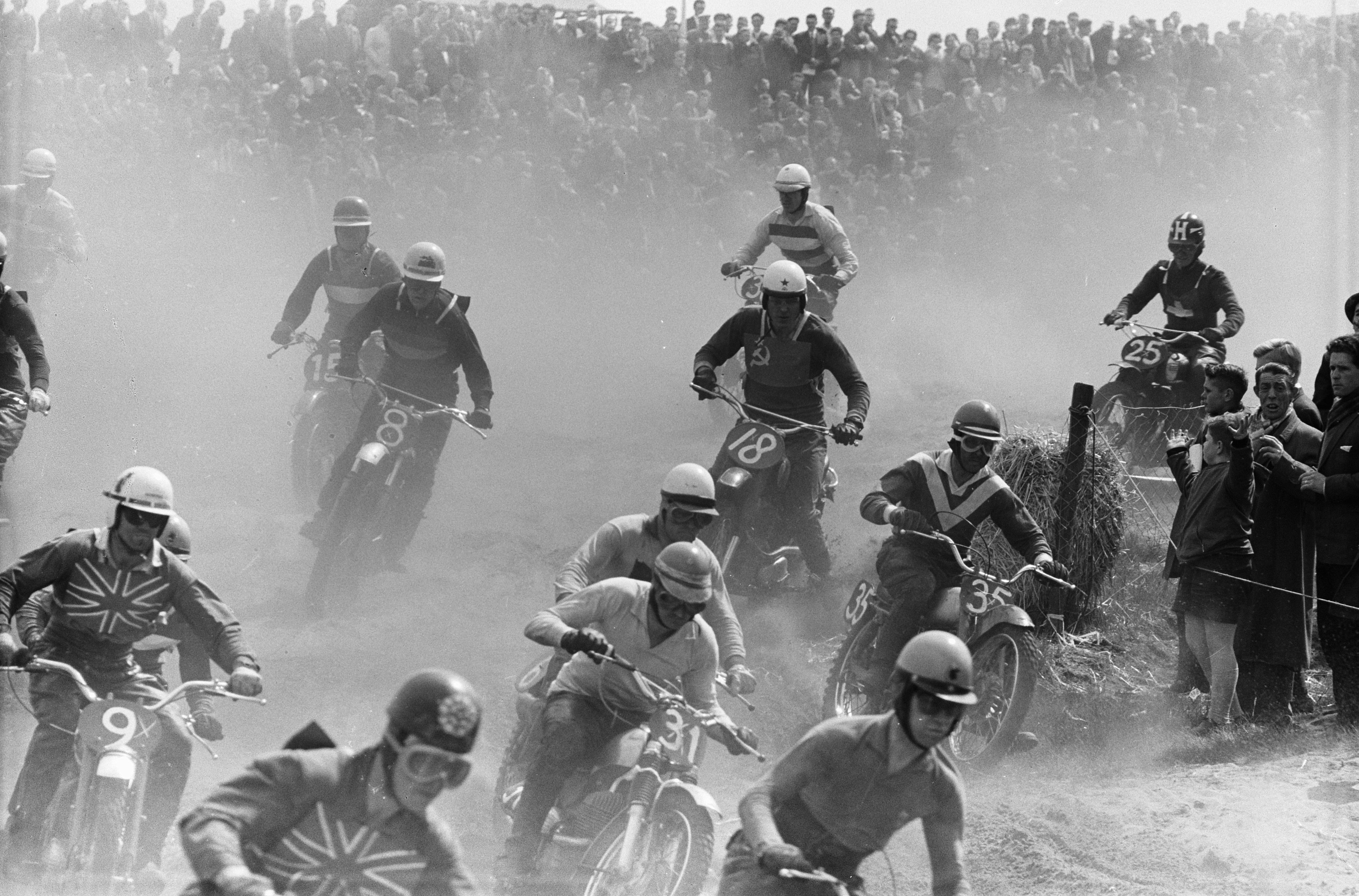
Motocross (1962)
