= Afferden, Gelderland =

Afferden
- Village
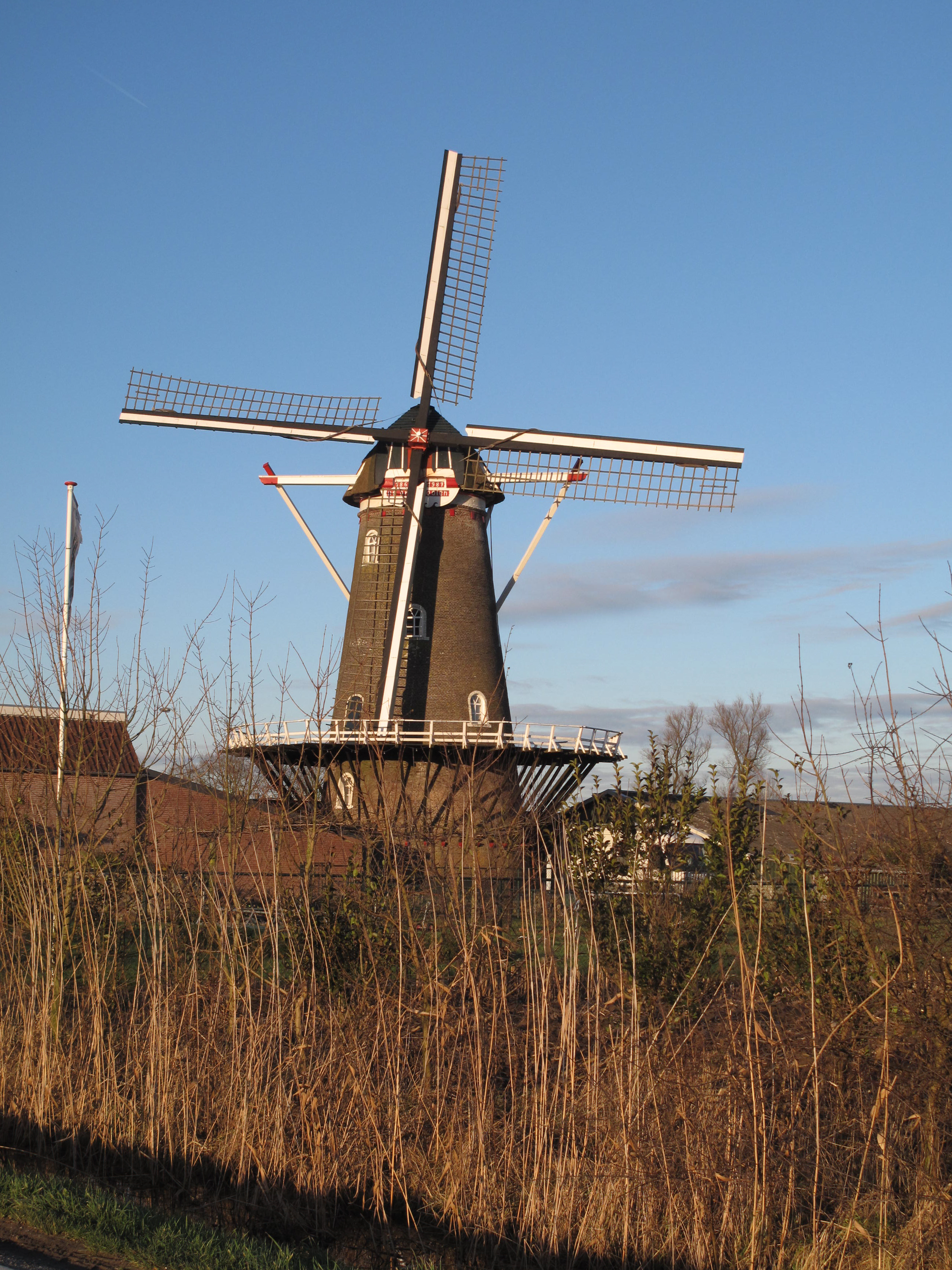
- Windmill De Drie Waaien.

- Location in the Netherlands Afferden (Netherlands)
- Coordinates: 51°52′48″N 5°38′5″E
- Country: Netherlands
- Province: Gelderland
- Municipality: Druten

Area
  - Total: 8.33 km^{2} (3.22 sq mi)
- Elevation: 7 m (23 ft)

Population (2021)
  - Total: 1,685
  - Density: 202/km^{2} (524/sq mi)
- Time zone: UTC+1 (CET)
  - Summer (DST): UTC+2 (CEST)
- Postal code: 6654
- Dialing code: 0487

Afferden (Dutch pronunciation: [ˈɑfərdə(n)]) is a village in the Dutch province of Gelderland. It is a part of the municipality of Druten, and lies about 10 km northwest of Wijchen.

Afferden was a separate municipality until 1818, when it became a part of Druten.

== History ==
It was first mentioned in the 11th to 12th century as Afrithon. The etymology is unknown. The village started on a sandhill near the Meuse, and developed into a linear road settlement. The church was demolished in 1838, but the tower from the 14th century has remained. The St. Victor en Gezellen Church was completed in 1891. In 1840, it was home to 838 people. The grist mill De Drie Waaien was built in 1869.

== Gallery ==
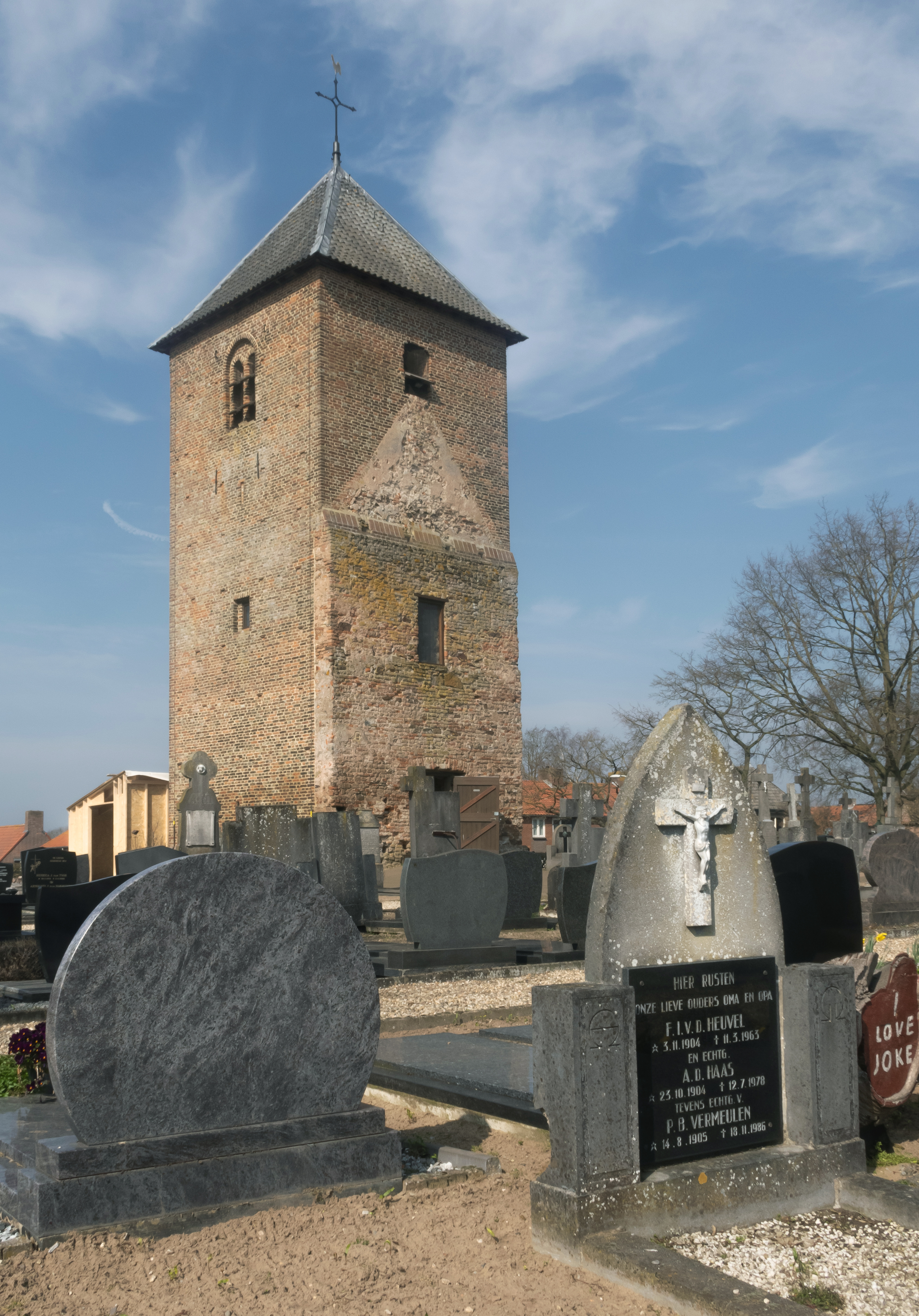
Church tower of Afferden

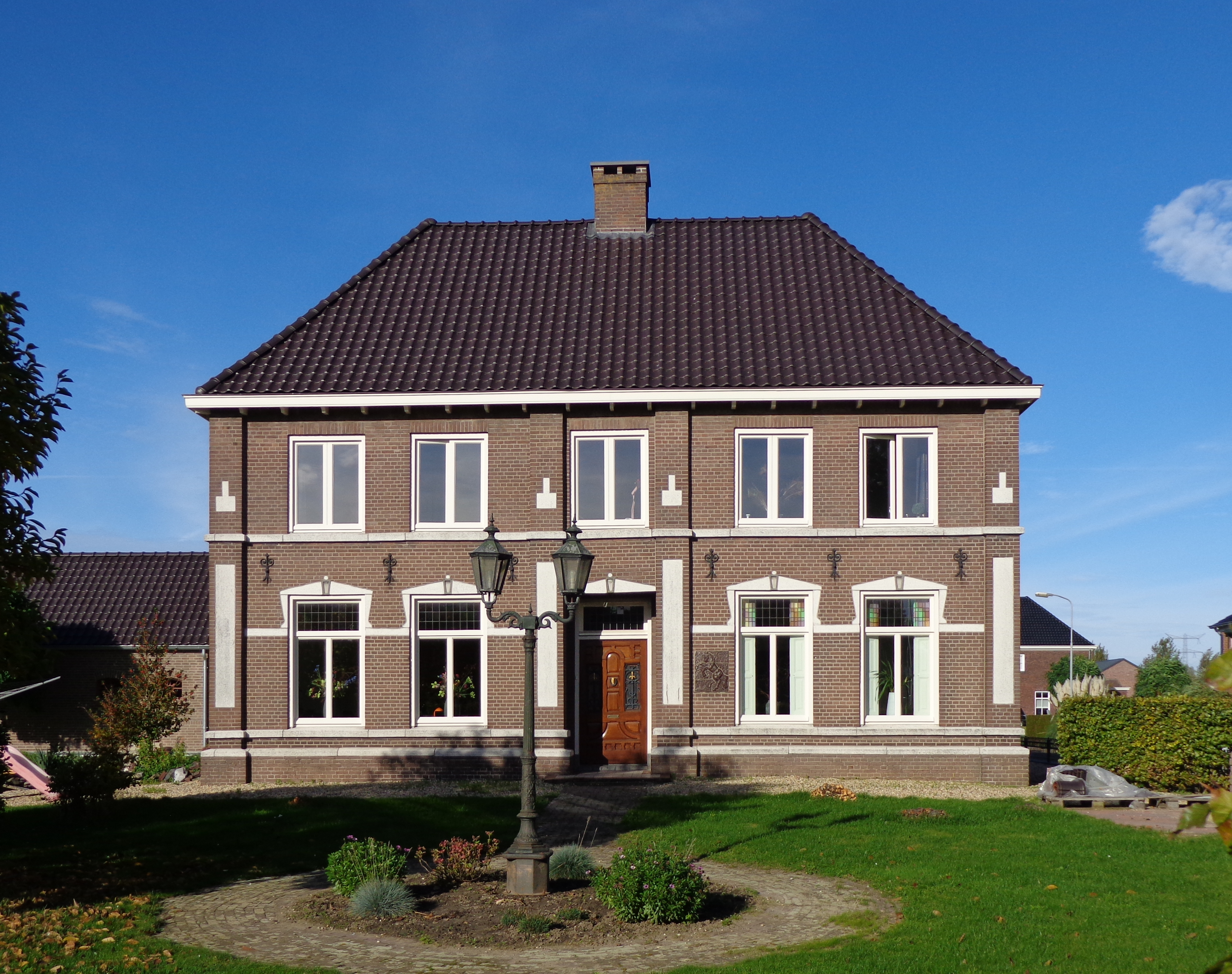
House in Afferden

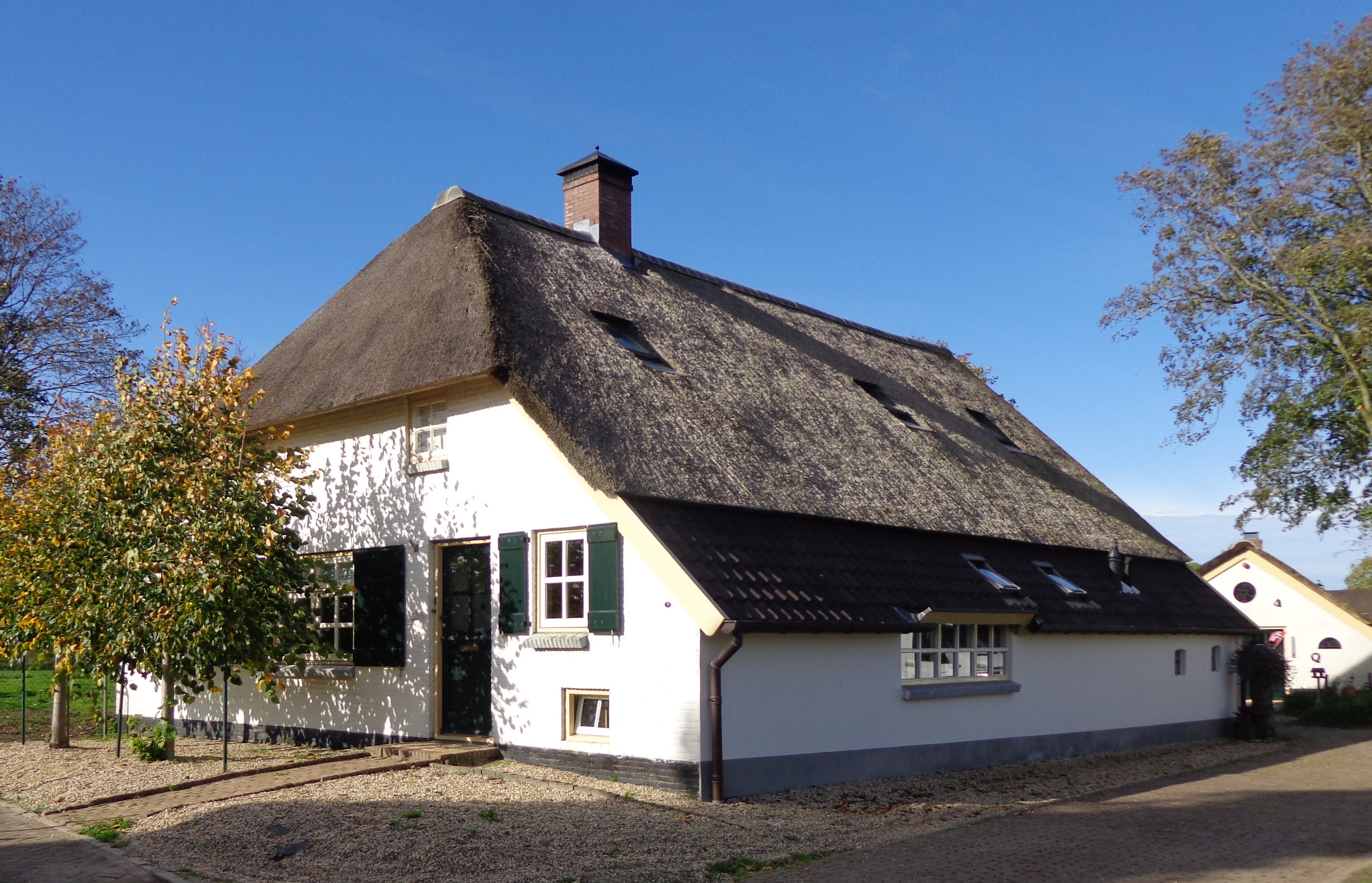
Farm in Afferden
