= Doesburgermolen =

Dutch windmill

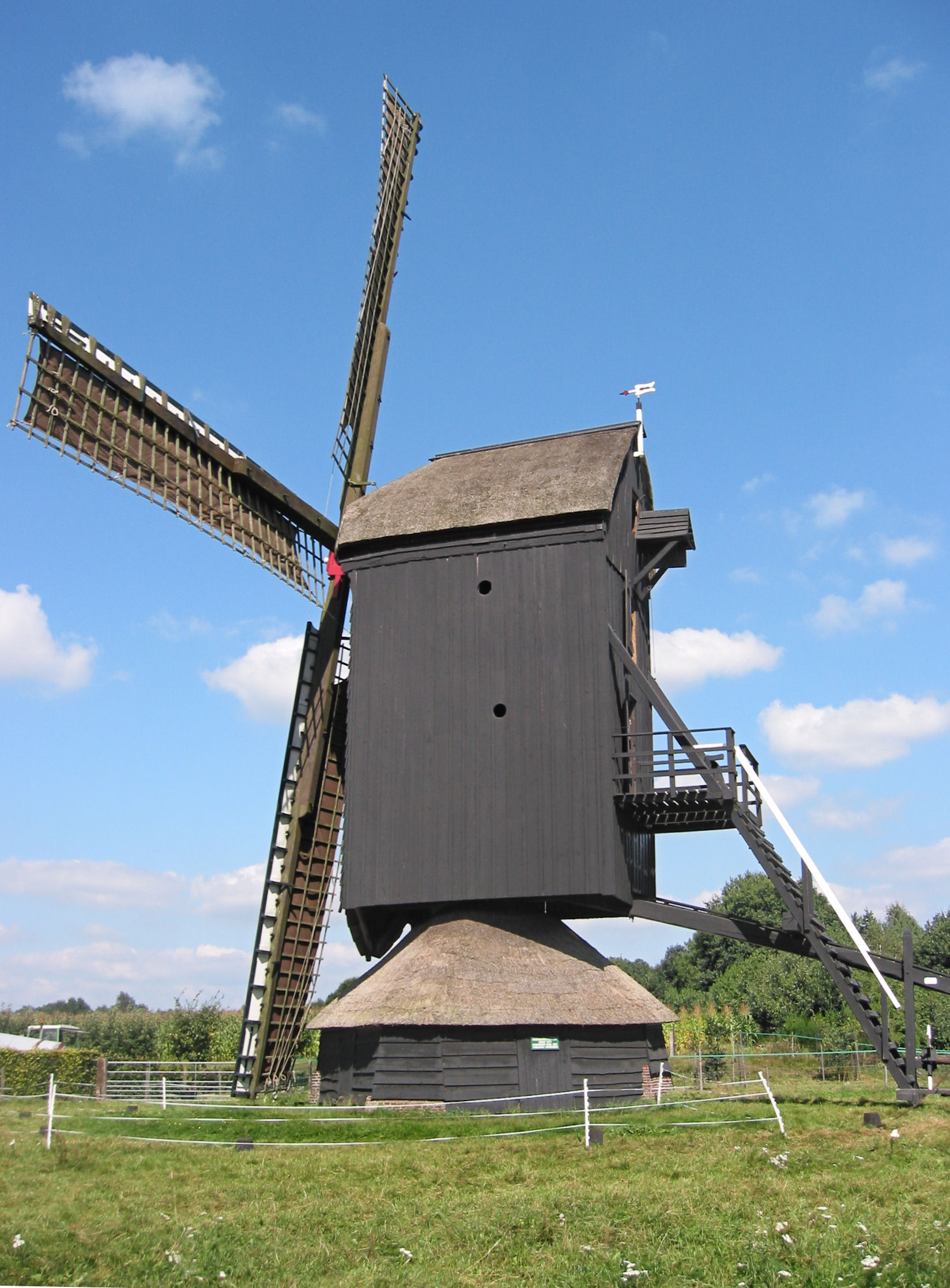
- Doesburgermolen, Ede, August 2007

Origin
- Mill name: Doesburgermolen
- Mill location: Ede, Netherlands
- Coordinates: 52°3′43.4″N 5°38′55.7″E
- Year built: abt. 1630

Information
- Purpose: Gristmill
- Type: Post mill
- Storeys: Two-storey mill
- No. of sails: Four sails
- Type of sails: Common sails
- Windshaft: Wood
- Winding: Tailpole and winch

The Doesburgermolen is a post mill in the hamlet of Doesburgerbuurt in the community of Ede, Netherlands

It is considered to be the oldest post mill in the Netherlands; in its present form it was probably built around 1630. It underwent a major restoration around 1970.

The mill is operated by volunteers and is still used for grinding grain.
