= Lingewaal =

- Former municipality
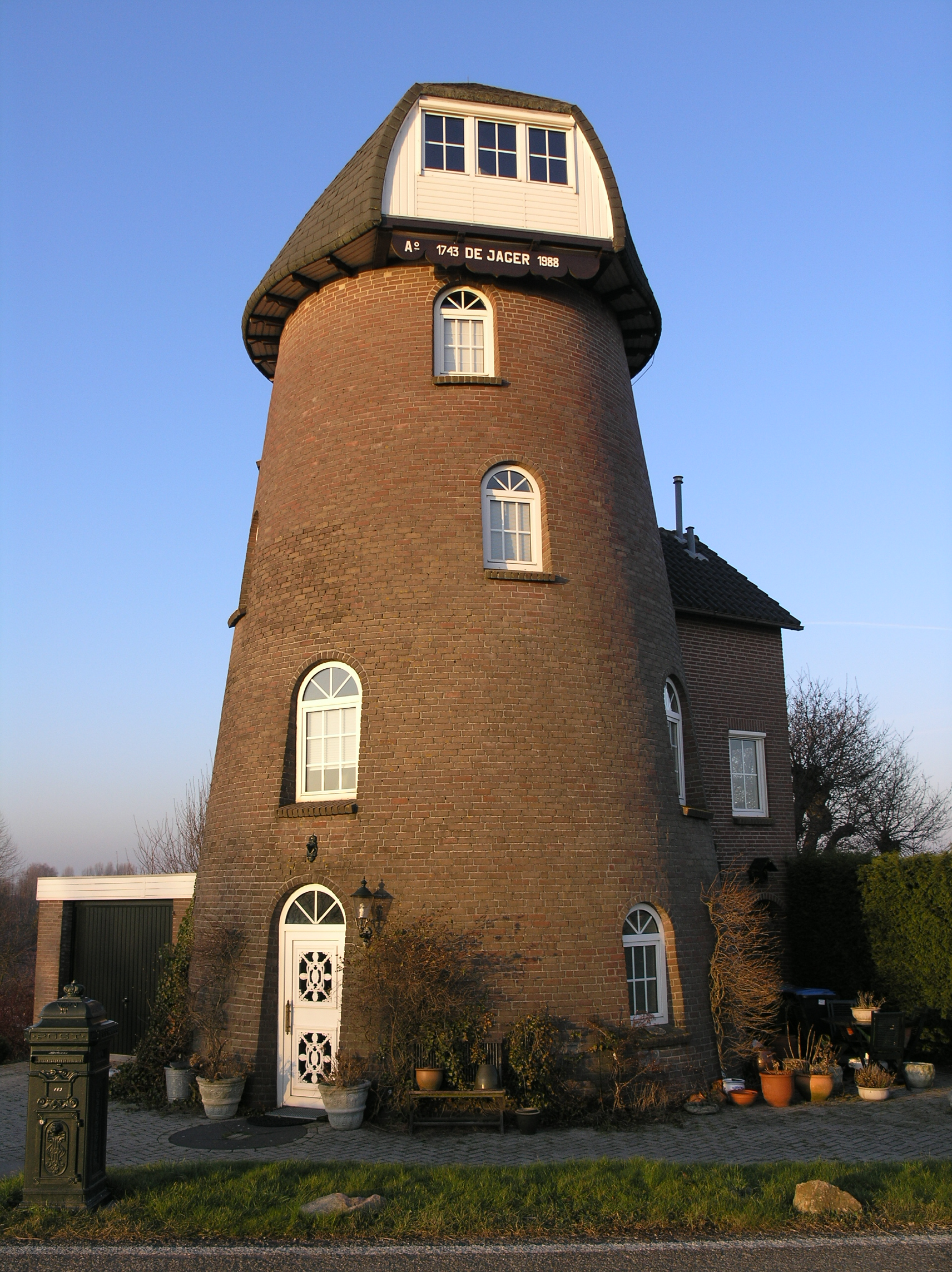
- Former windmill in Herwijnen

- Flag Coat of arms

- Location in Gelderland
- Coordinates: 51°53′N 5°7′E
- Country: Netherlands
- Province: Gelderland
- Municipality: West Betuwe
- Established: 1 January 1986
- Merged: 2019

Area
  - Total: 54.49 km^{2} (21.04 sq mi)
  - Land: 50.44 km^{2} (19.47 sq mi)
  - Water: 4.05 km^{2} (1.56 sq mi)
- Elevation: 2 m (6.6 ft)

Population (January 2021)
  - Total: data missing
- Time zone: UTC+1 (CET)
  - Summer (DST): UTC+2 (CEST)
- Postcode: Parts of 4100 and 4200 ranges
- Area code: 0183, 0345, 0418
- Website: www.lingewaal.nl

Lingewaal (Dutch pronunciation: [ˌlɪŋəˈʋaːl]) is a former municipality in the province of Gelderland in the Netherlands.

On 1 January 2019, the municipality merged with Geldermalsen and Neerijnen to form the new municipality of West Betuwe.

== History ==
The municipality was formed in 1986 from the former municipalities of Asperen, Heukelum, Herwijnen, Spijk and Vuren, with the exception of Dalem, which was included in the municipality of Gorinchem. Immediately after the merger, the municipality was briefly called Vuren, after the village of the same name. On January 1, 2019, the municipality of Lingewaal merged with Neerijnen and Geldermalsen into the merged municipality of West Betuwe.

== Population centres ==
- Asperen
- Herwijnen
- Heukelum
- Spijk
- Vuren

== Topography ==
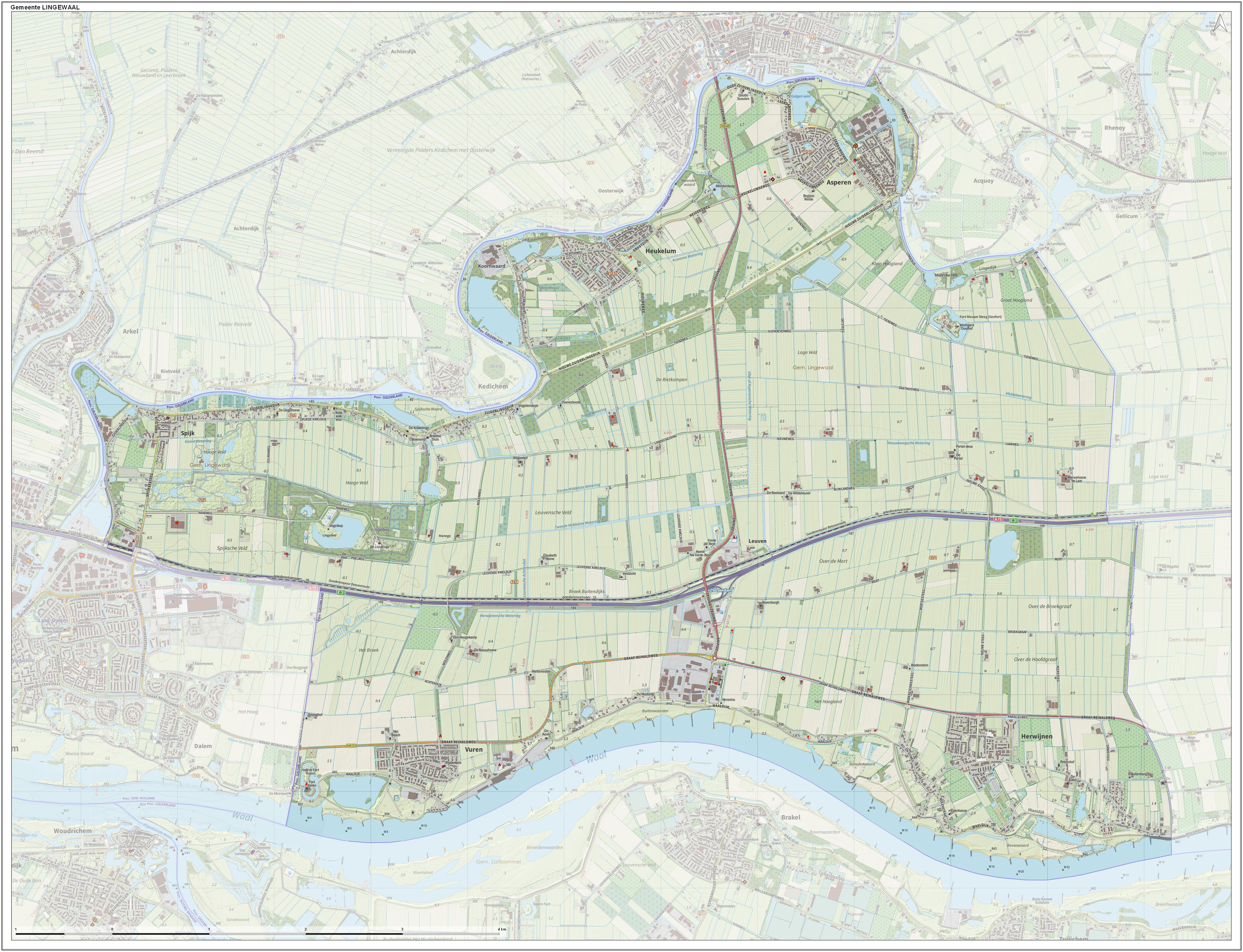

Dutch topographic map of the municipality of Lingewaal, June 2015
