= Herwijnen =

- Village
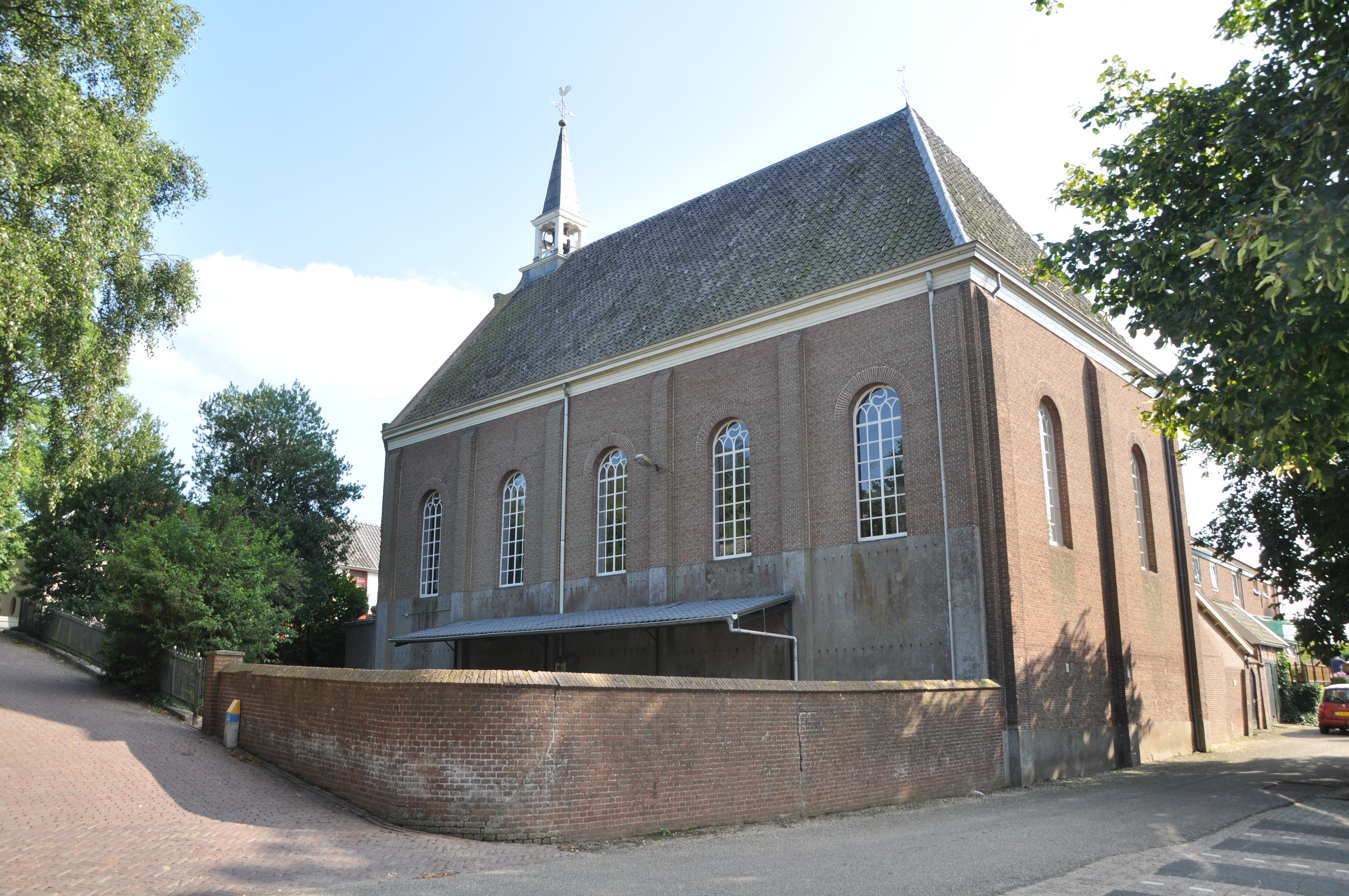
- Church of Herwijnen

- Coat of arms

- Location in the Netherlands Herwijnen (Netherlands)
- Coordinates: 51°49′31″N 5°7′49″E
- Country: Netherlands
- Province: Gelderland
- Municipality: West Betuwe

Area
  - Total: 24.04 km^{2} (9.28 sq mi)
- Elevation: 1 m (3.3 ft)

Population (2022)
  - Total: 2,790
  - Density: 116/km^{2} (301/sq mi)
- Time zone: UTC+1 (CET)
  - Summer (DST): UTC+2 (CEST)
- Postal code: 4171
- Dialing code: 0418

Herwijnen is a village in the Dutch province of Gelderland. It is a part of the municipality of West Betuwe, and lies about 11 km east of Gorinchem.

Herwijnen was a separate municipality until 1986, when it was merged with Vuren, Asperen, Heukelum and Spijk as municipality of Lingewaal. Since 2019 Lingewaal merged with Geldermalsen and Neerijnen in the new municipality of West Betuwe.

== History ==
It was first mentioned in 850 as Heriuuinna, and means "meadow of the lord". Herwijnen developed into a stretched dike village. The Dutch Reformed Church dates from 1823. In 1840, it was home to 1,784 people.

The former Fort de Nieuwe Steeg was built in 1878 as part of the Nieuwe Hollandse Waterlinie, a line of defence to protect Holland. The fort contains two bomb resistant barracks. To the west of Fort Vuren was constructed from a 1844 redoubt.

In 2022 the Dutch Ministry of Defence choose Herwijnen as location for the construction of a new radarstation.

== Notable people ==
- Johannes van den Bosch (1780-1844) Governor-General of the Dutch East Indies from 1830 to 1833
- Patrick Vroegh (1999), football player

== Gallery ==
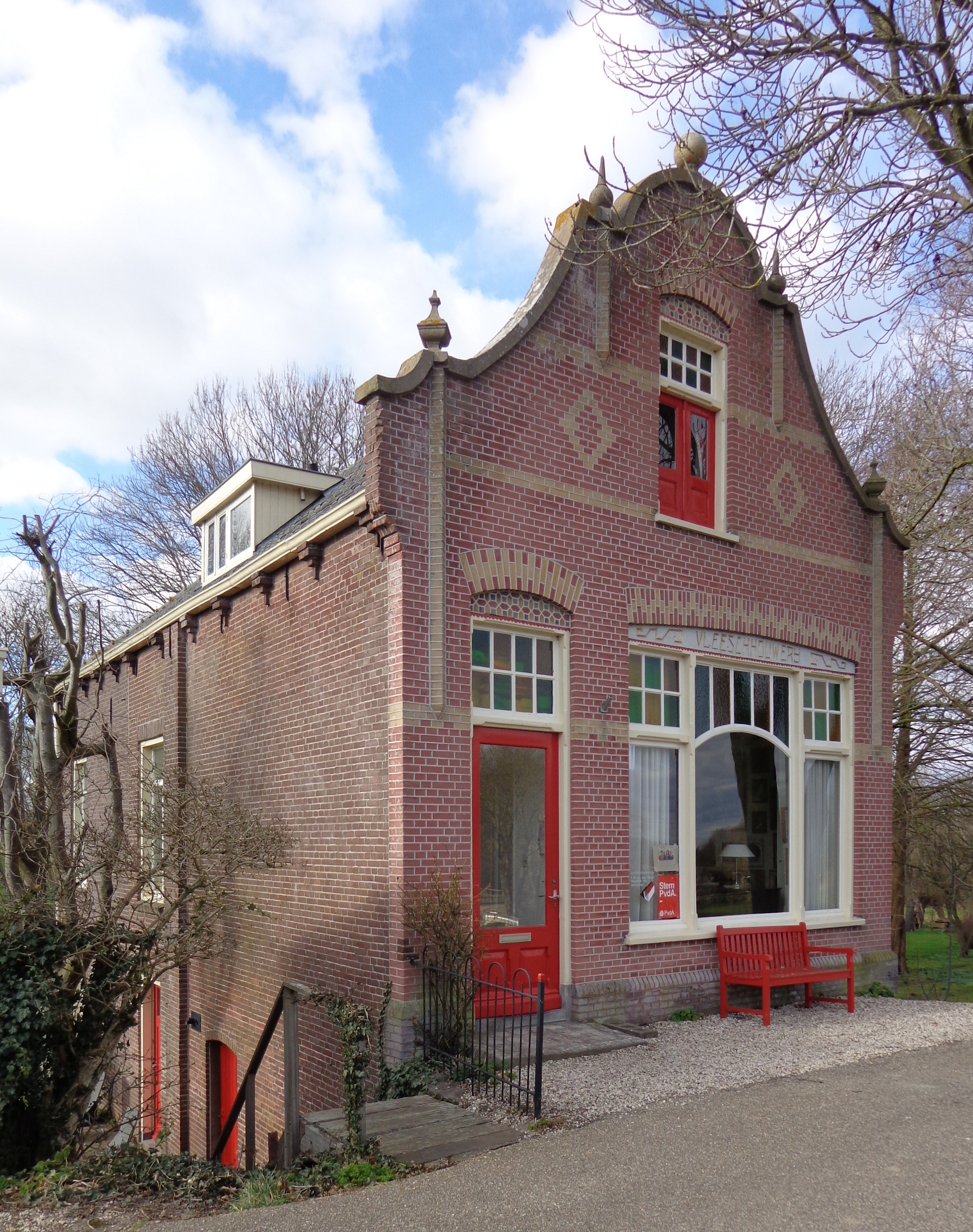
House in Herwijnen

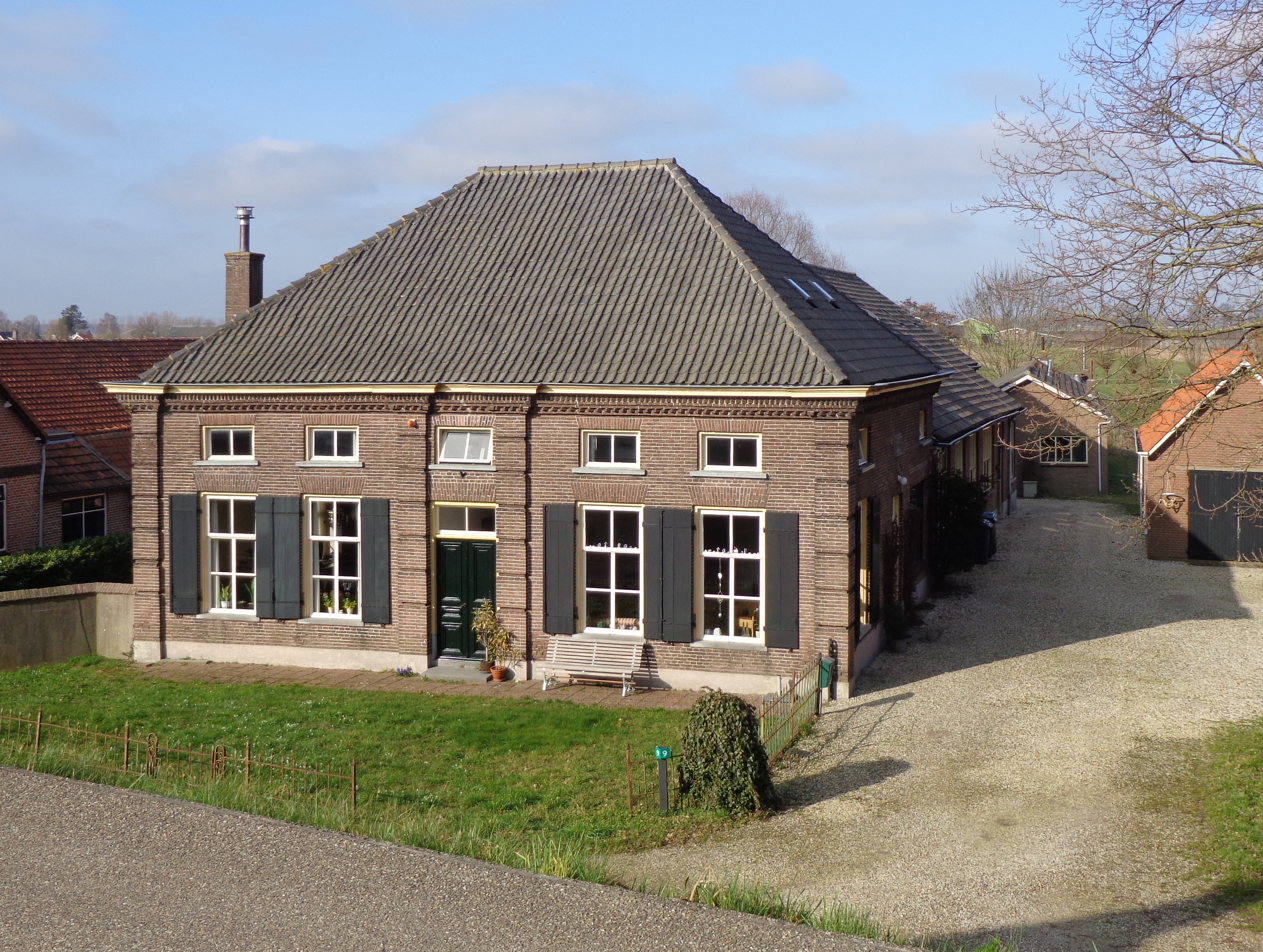
Farm in Herwijnen

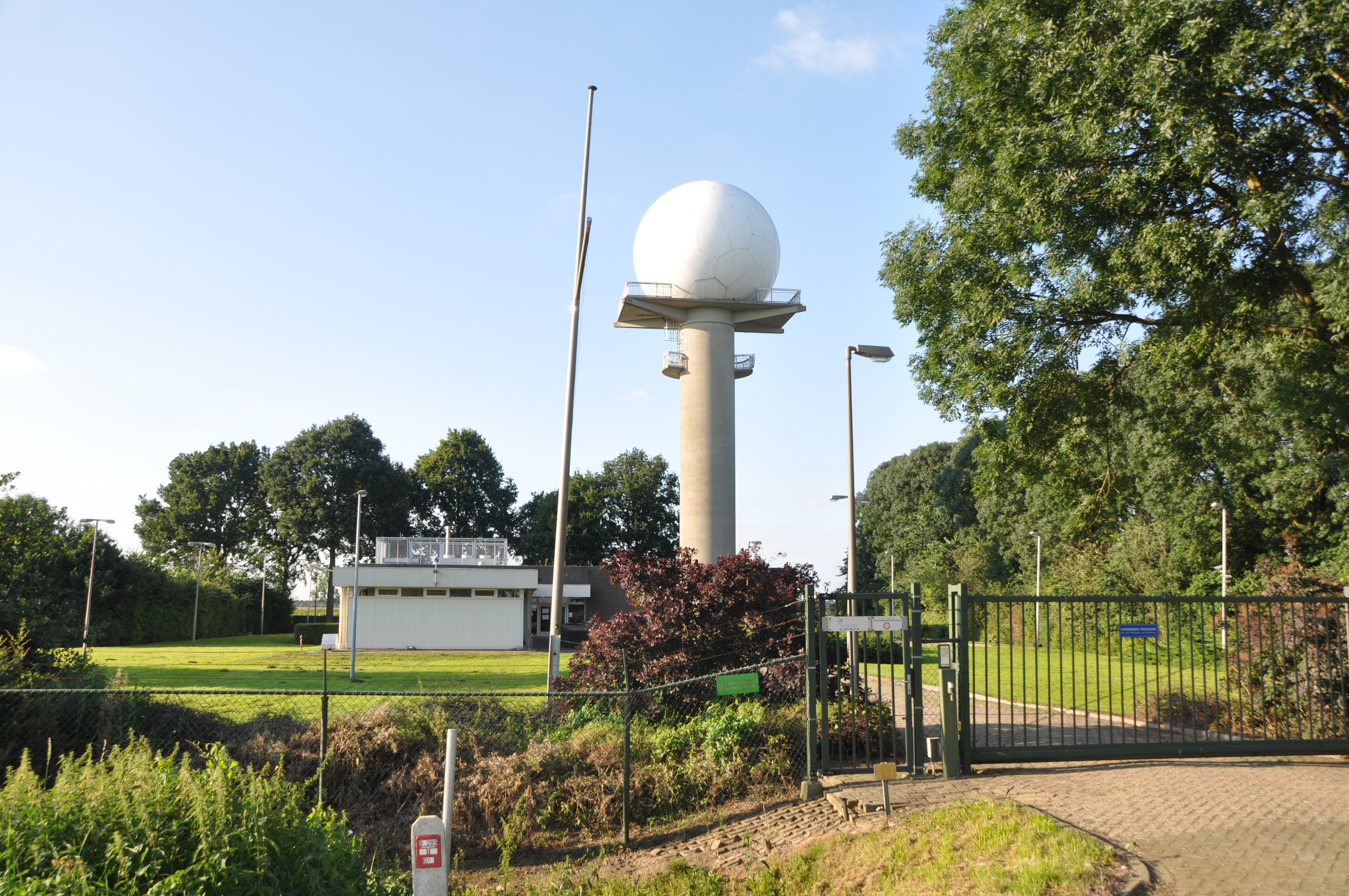
Radar installation

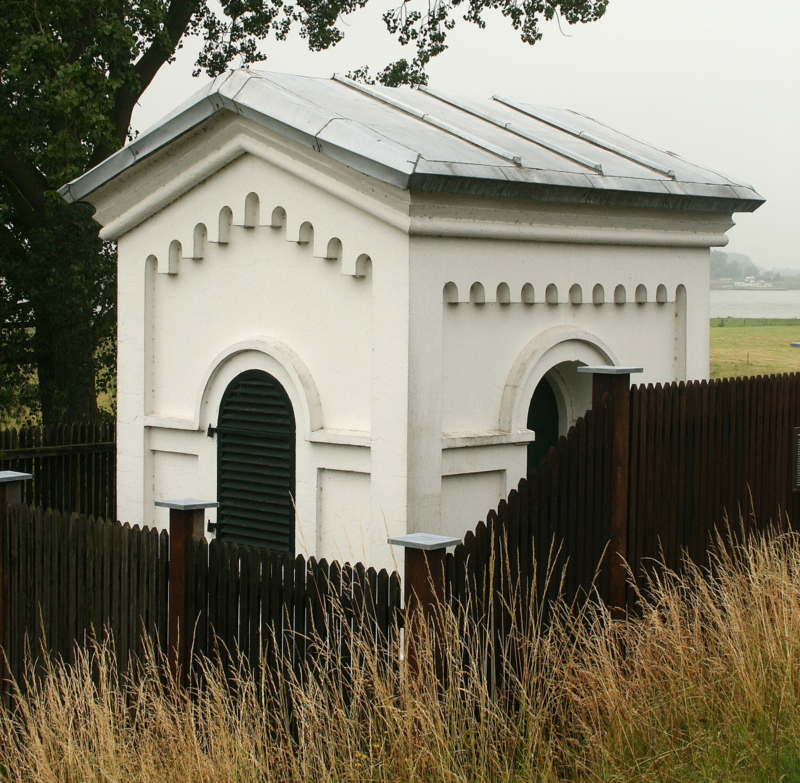
Building which was used to measure water heights and detect ice

== Climate ==
Climate data for Herwijnen (1991−2020 normals, extremes 1989−present)
Month	Jan	Feb	Mar	Apr	May	Jun	Jul	Aug	Sep	Oct	Nov	Dec	Year
Record high °C (°F)	14.9 (58.8)	18.3 (64.9)	23.0 (73.4)	28.1 (82.6)	32.0 (89.6)	34.3 (93.7)	37.6 (99.7)	34.8 (94.6)	32.8 (91.0)	27.0 (80.6)	19.6 (67.3)	15.3 (59.5)	37.6 (99.7)
Mean daily maximum °C (°F)	6.0 (42.8)	6.9 (44.4)	10.4 (50.7)	14.7 (58.5)	18.4 (65.1)	21.1 (70.0)	23.1 (73.6)	23.0 (73.4)	19.5 (67.1)	14.8 (58.6)	9.8 (49.6)	6.5 (43.7)	14.5 (58.1)
Daily mean °C (°F)	3.4 (38.1)	3.6 (38.5)	6.2 (43.2)	9.5 (49.1)	13.3 (55.9)	16.1 (61.0)	18.1 (64.6)	17.7 (63.9)	14.6 (58.3)	10.8 (51.4)	6.8 (44.2)	4.0 (39.2)	10.3 (50.5)
Mean daily minimum °C (°F)	0.5 (32.9)	0.3 (32.5)	1.9 (35.4)	3.8 (38.8)	7.5 (45.5)	10.5 (50.9)	12.7 (54.9)	12.2 (54.0)	9.7 (49.5)	6.7 (44.1)	3.5 (38.3)	1.1 (34.0)	5.9 (42.6)
Record low °C (°F)	−18.0 (−0.4)	−21.4 (−6.5)	−15.9 (3.4)	−6.3 (20.7)	−1.5 (29.3)	0.1 (32.2)	4.8 (40.6)	3.1 (37.6)	−0.3 (31.5)	−7.5 (18.5)	−8.7 (16.3)	−16.3 (2.7)	−21.4 (−6.5)
Average precipitation mm (inches)	67.9 (2.67)	61.3 (2.41)	56.3 (2.22)	39.0 (1.54)	60.0 (2.36)	64.0 (2.52)	74.2 (2.92)	80.1 (3.15)	65.0 (2.56)	70.5 (2.78)	68.2 (2.69)	79.4 (3.13)	785.9 (30.94)
Average relative humidity (%)	89.0	86.6	82.7	77.8	76.3	77.6	78.8	80.6	84.5	87.3	90.6	90.6	83.5
Mean monthly sunshine hours	71.0	92.7	143.0	192.9	222.5	213.6	216.5	200.3	157.6	122.3	72.5	59.8	1,764.7
Percentage possible sunshine	27.4	32.9	38.8	46.4	45.9	42.9	43.2	44.1	41.4	36.9	27.1	24.5	37.6
Source: Royal Netherlands Meteorological Institute
