= Enspijk =

- Village
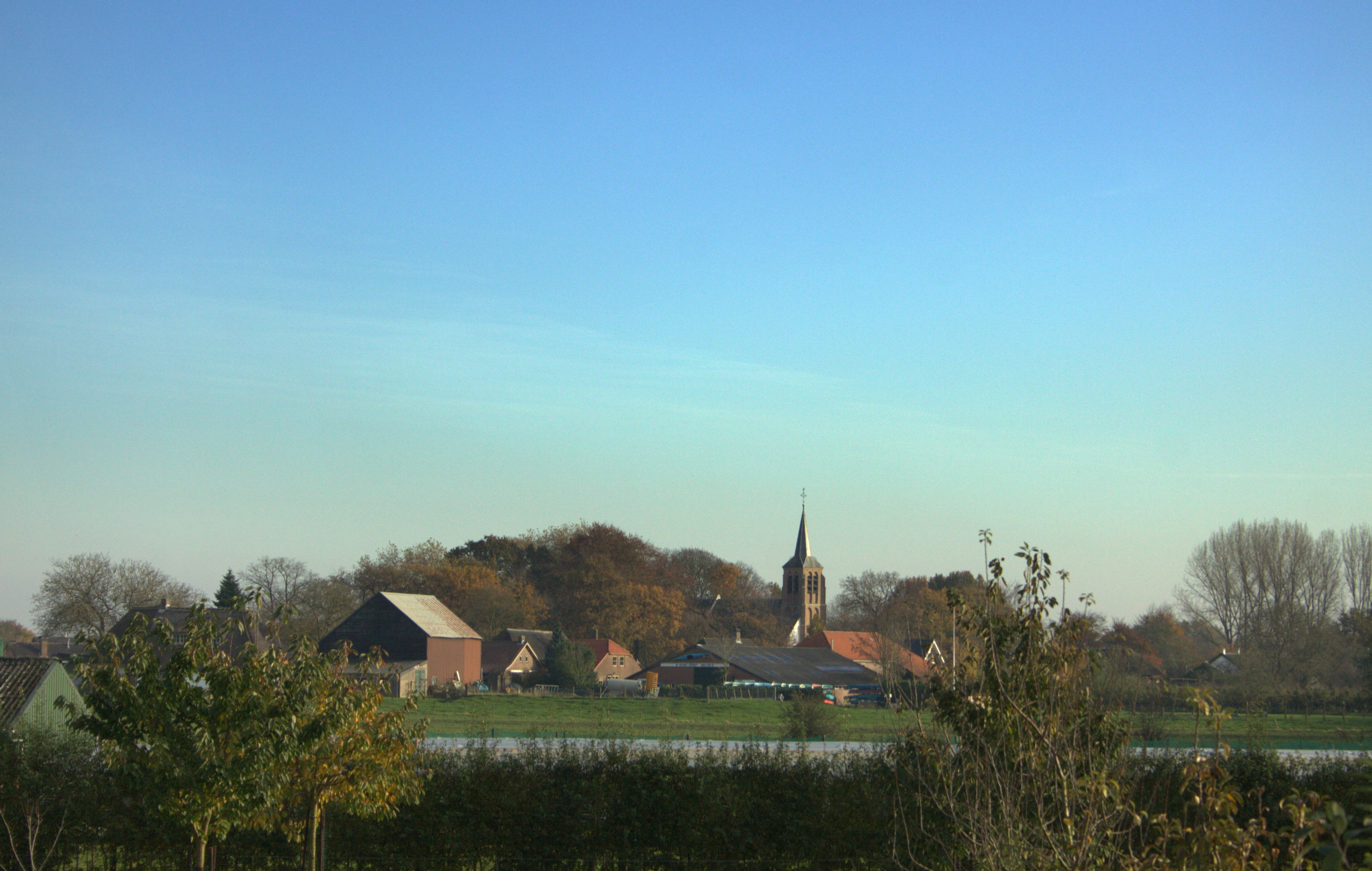
- View on Enspijk

- Coat of arms

- Location in the Netherlands Enspijk (Netherlands)
- Coordinates: 51°53′1″N 5°12′47″E
- Country: Netherlands
- Province: Gelderland
- Municipality: West Betuwe

Area
  - Total: 7.82 km^{2} (3.02 sq mi)
- Elevation: 3 m (9.8 ft)

Population (2021)
  - Total: 600
  - Density: 77/km^{2} (200/sq mi)
- Time zone: UTC+1 (CET)
  - Summer (DST): UTC+2 (CEST)
- Postal code: 4157
- Dialing code: 0345

Enspijk is a village in the Dutch province of Gelderland. It is a part of the municipality of West Betuwe, and lies about 14 km (8.69 miles) west of Tiel.

Enspijk was first mentioned in 1148 as Inspic, and means promontory. The en (inwards) was added to distinguish from neighbouring Spijk. Enspijk developed as a concentrated esdorp perpendicular to the dike of the Linge. The Dutch Reformed Church dates from the early 15th century and is a replacement of a 13th century church. The tower was built at the end of the 15th century. Huis te Enspijk was a castle. It was probably built in the 15th century, and was demolished in 1828. In 1840, it was home to 247 people.

== Notable residents ==
- Erik Pieters (born 1988) football player

== Gallery ==
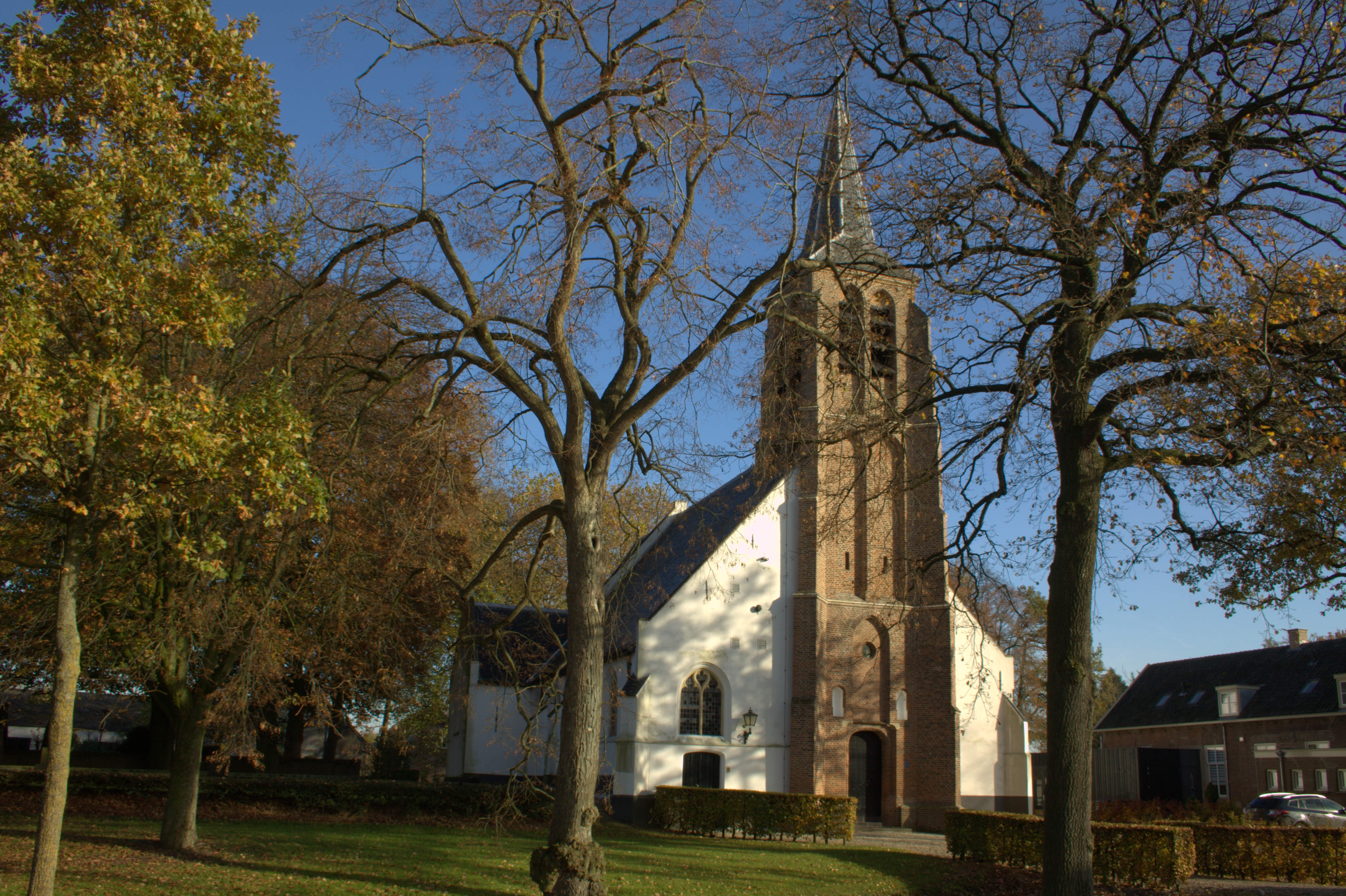
Dutch Reformed Church

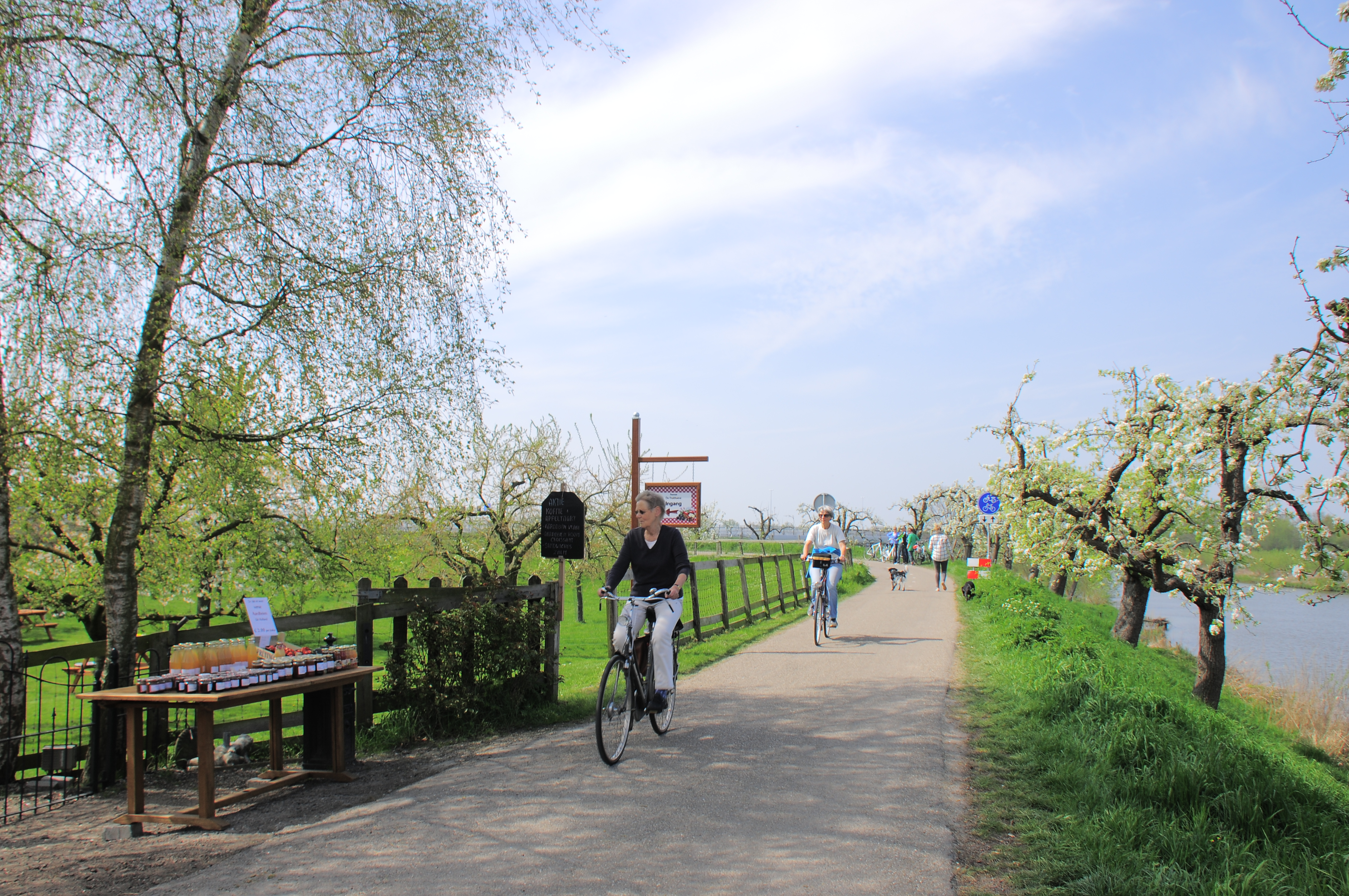
Tea Garden with fruit trees in bloom

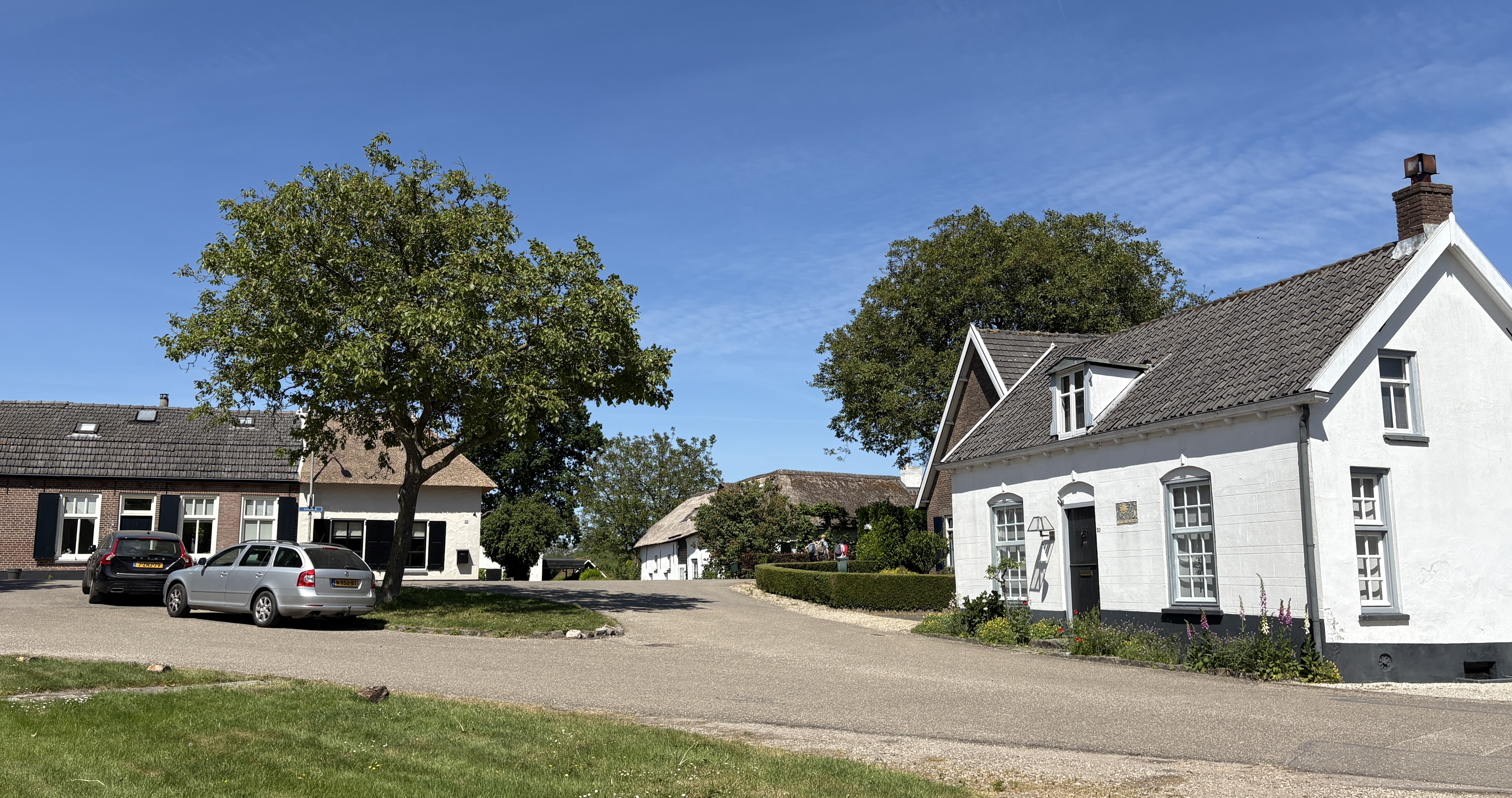
The Dorpsstraat

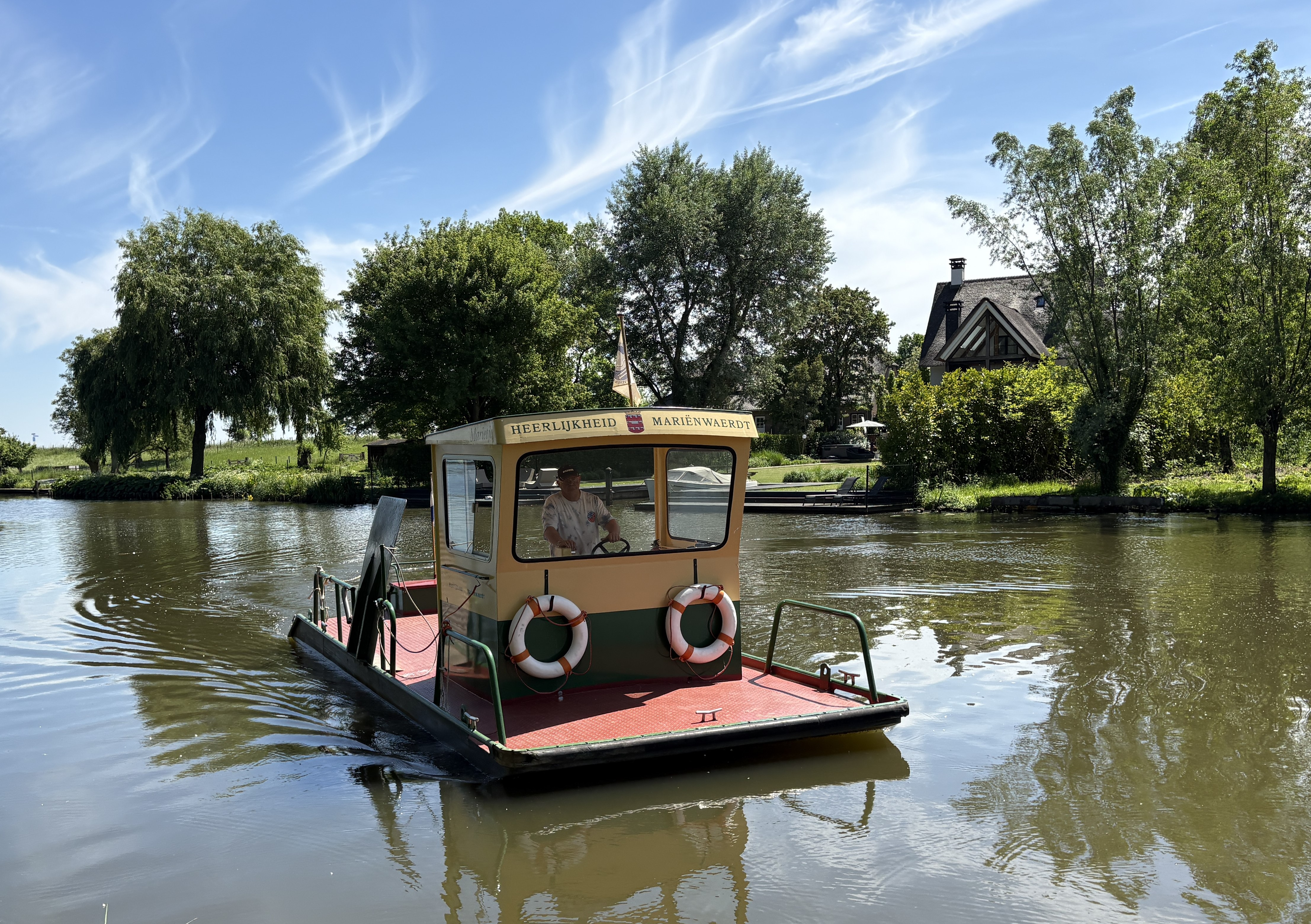
Ferry for pedestrians and bicyles on the Linge river
