= Vuren =

- Village
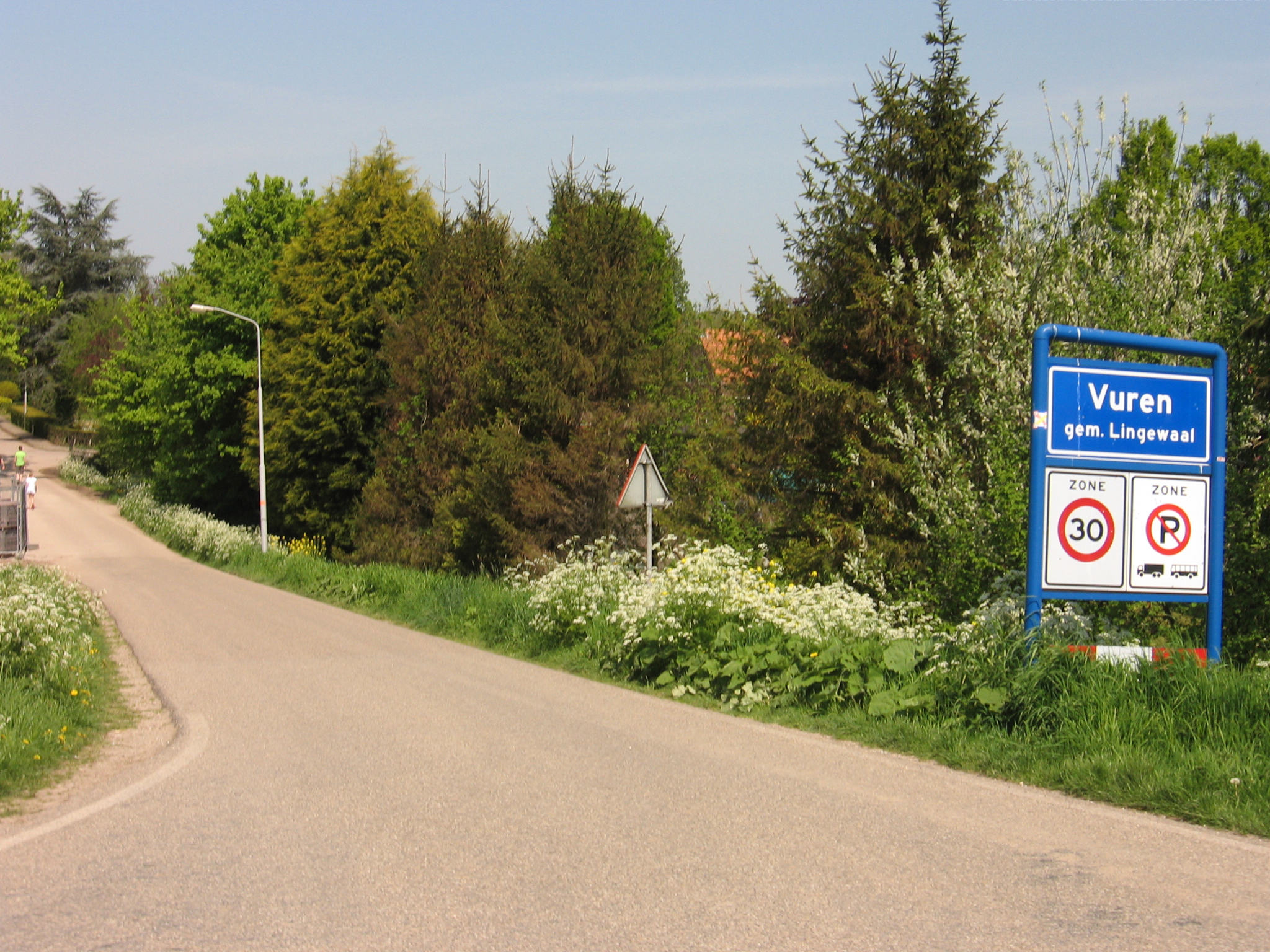
- Entering the village

- Coat of arms

- Location in the Netherlands Vuren (Netherlands)
- Coordinates: 51°49′28″N 5°2′48″E
- Country: Netherlands
- Province: Gelderland
- Municipality: West Betuwe

Area
  - Total: 21.53 km^{2} (8.31 sq mi)
- Elevation: 1 m (3.3 ft)

Population (2021)
  - Total: 2,130
  - Density: 98.9/km^{2} (256/sq mi)
- Time zone: UTC+1 (CET)
  - Summer (DST): UTC+2 (CEST)
- Postal code: 4214
- Dialing code: 0183

Vuren is a village in the Dutch province of Gelderland. It is a part of the municipality of West Betuwe, and is located about 5 km east of Gorinchem.

Vuren was a separate municipality until 1986, when it merged with Asperen, Herwijnen, and Heukelum including Spijk. The new municipality was originally called "Vuren", but the name changed to "Lingewaal" in 1987. Before 1816, the municipality of Vuren was named "Dalem".

In 2001, the village of Vuren had 1575 inhabitants. The built-up area of the village was 0.47 km², and contained 608 residences. The statistical area "Vuren", which also can include the peripheral parts of the village, as well as the surrounding countryside, has a population of around 2090.

The fort at Vuren formed as part of the defensive Hollandic Water Line.

== Trivia ==
- It is possible that the clan of van Vuuren, originated from here, despite the modern majority of the clan being based in South Africa

== Gallery ==
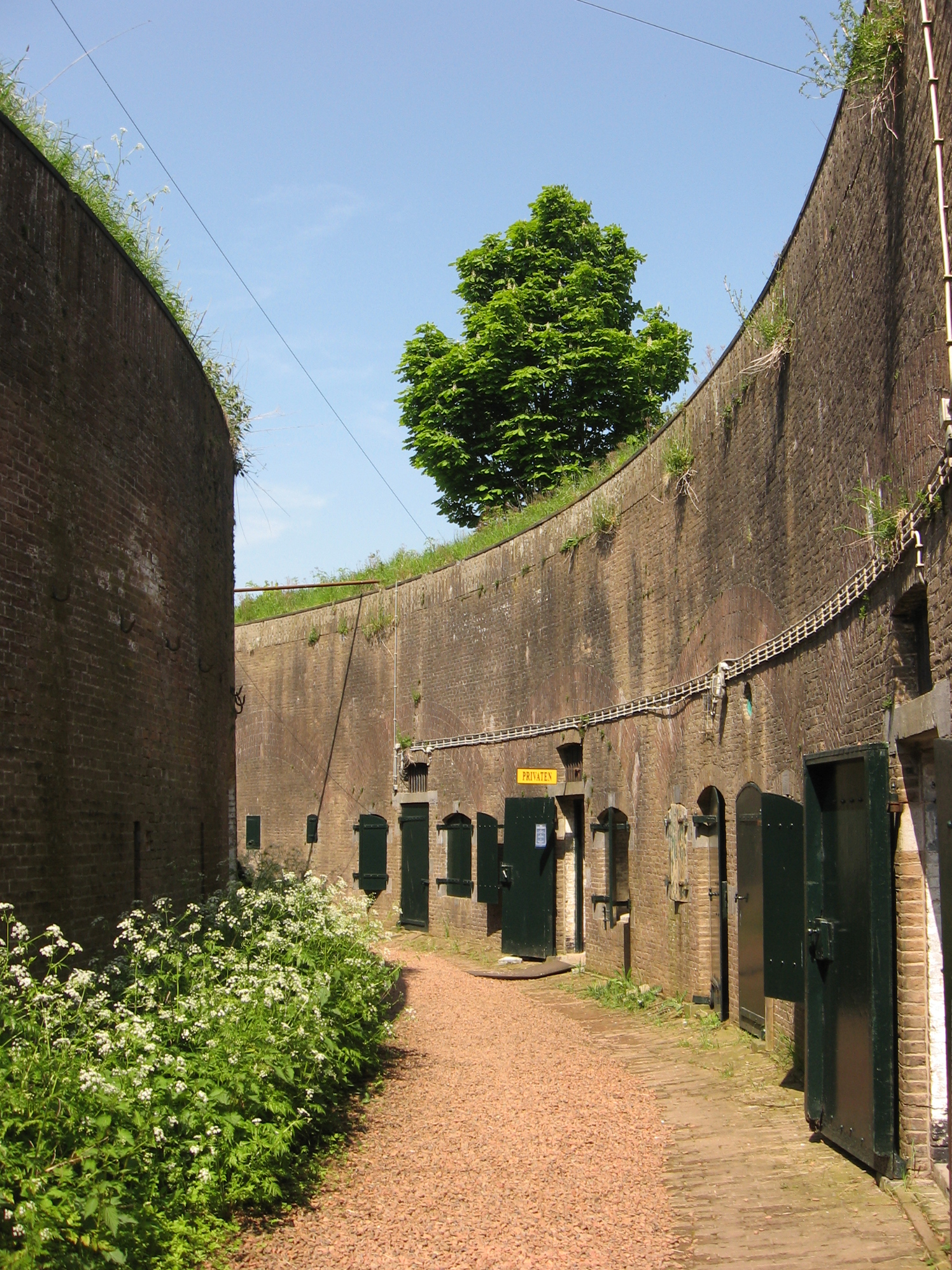
Fort Vuren

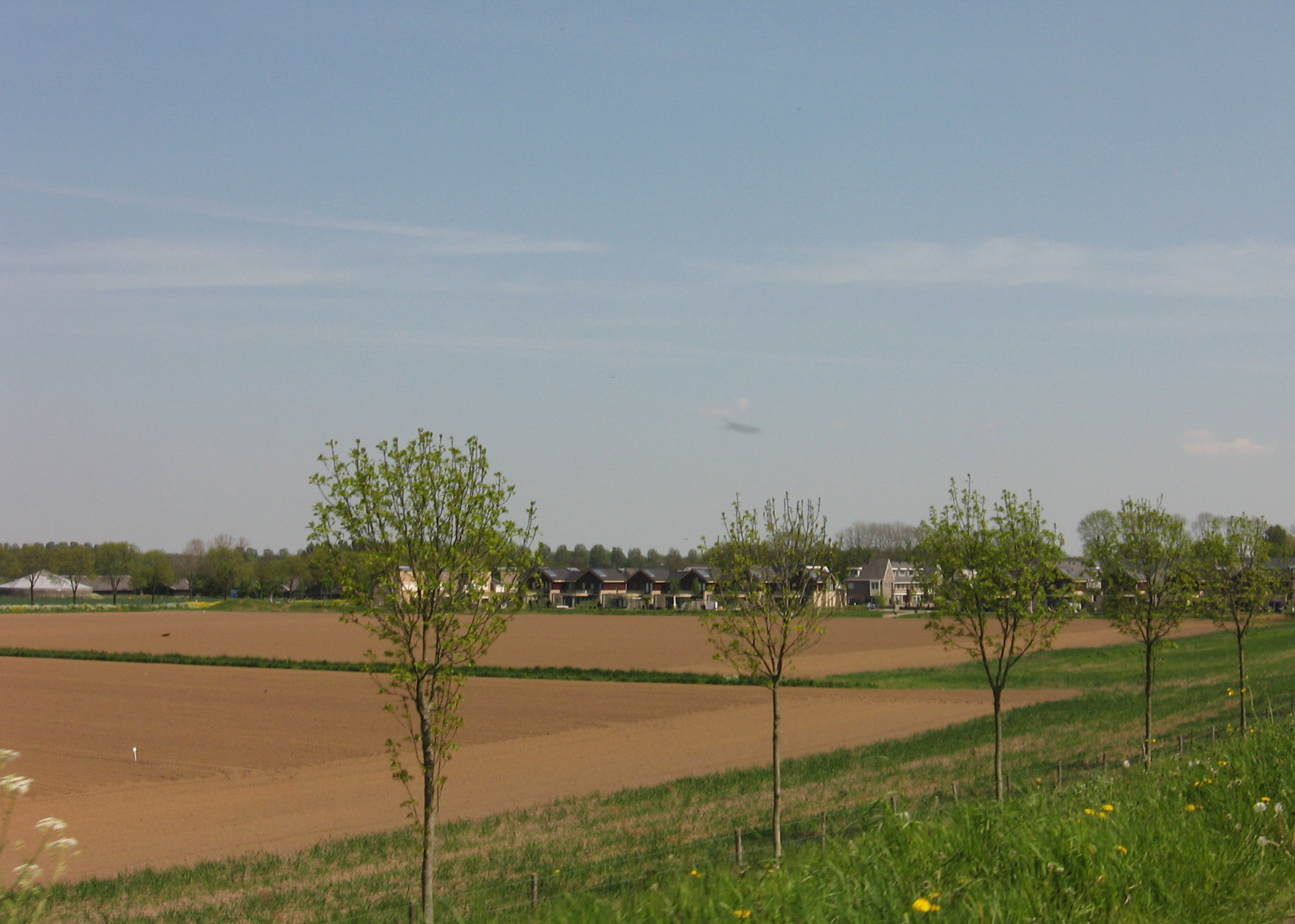
Landscape with view at Vuren
