= Heukelum =

- Small city
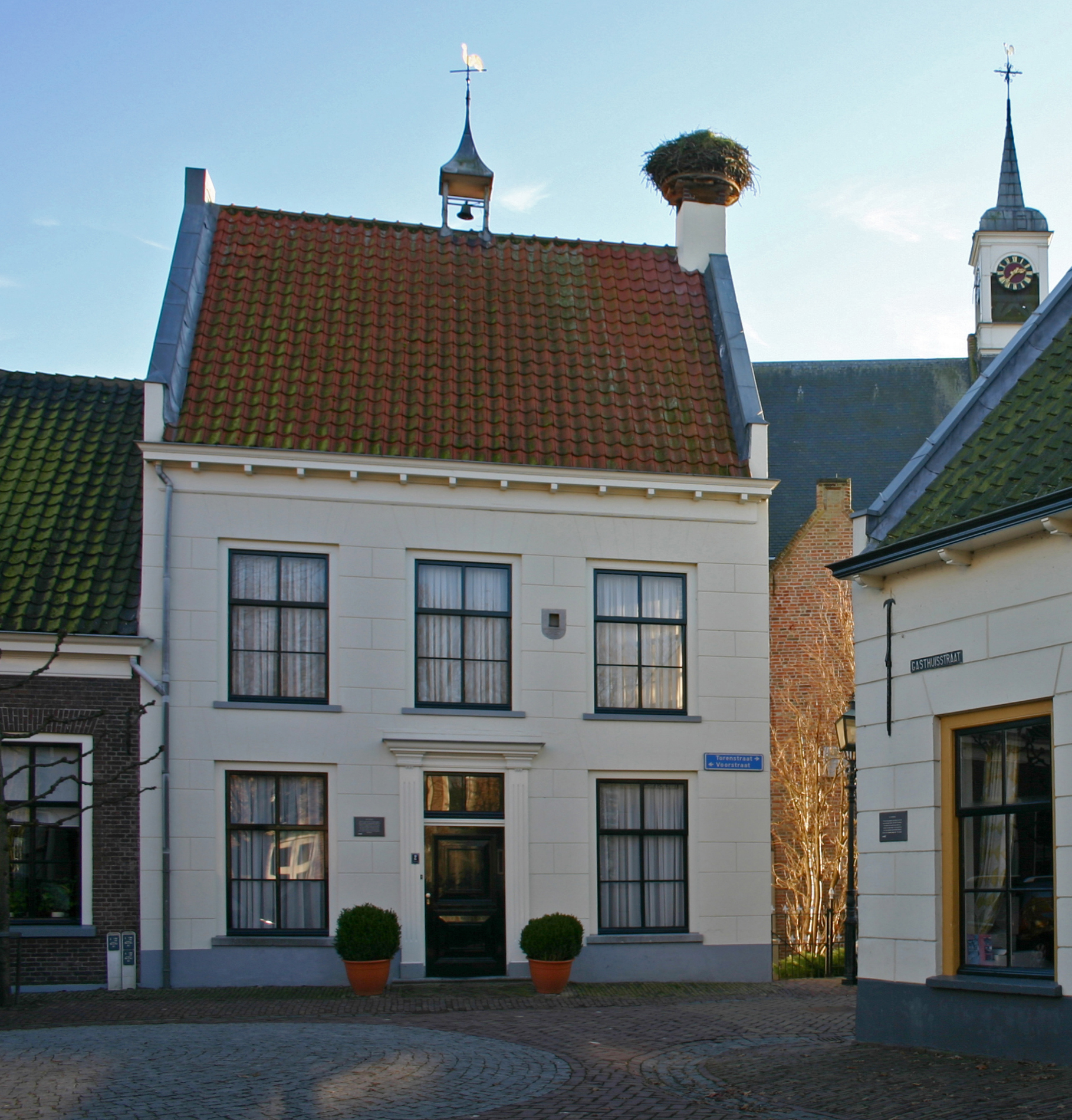
- Former town hall

- Flag Coat of arms

- Location in the province of Gelderland in the Netherlands Heukelum (Netherlands)
- Coordinates: 51°52′23″N 5°4′36″E
- Country: Netherlands
- Province: Gelderland
- Municipality: West Betuwe

Area
  - Total: 3.62 km^{2} (1.40 sq mi)
- Elevation: 1.8 m (5.9 ft)

Population (2021)
  - Total: 2,280
  - Density: 630/km^{2} (1,630/sq mi)
- Time zone: UTC+1 (CET)
  - Summer (DST): UTC+2 (CEST)
- Postal code: 4161
- Dialing code: 0345

Heukelum is a city in the Dutch province of Gelderland. It is a part of the municipality of West Betuwe, and lies about 8 km northeast of Gorinchem. It received city rights in 1391.

== History ==
It was first mentioned in 996 as Ukele, and means "settlement on the height". Heukelum is an elongated esdorp which developed on the river bank of the Linge in the Early Middle Ages.

The Dutch Reformed church developed in stages between 1350 and 1510 to replace its predecessor from around 1250. The tower and nave were destroyed by fire in 1699. Part of the defensive works around the city from the 16th and 17th century are still present.

Heukelum Castle (also Merckenburg Castle) was originally built before 1286 by the van Arkel family as one of nine castles to defend the Land van Arkel against Holland and Gelderland. It is the only castle which remained after the Arkel War (1401–1412). In 1672, it was severely damaged by the French. The castle changed ownership several times, but is still private property.

Heukelum was flooded many times during its history. The last times were in 1939 and 1945 when the area around Heelsum was inundated to thwart the advance of the German and Allied armies respectively.

Heukelum was home to 535 people in 1840. Heukelum was a separate municipality until 1986, when it became part of Vuren. The area was part of South Holland until then, and is now part of Gelderland.

== Gallery ==
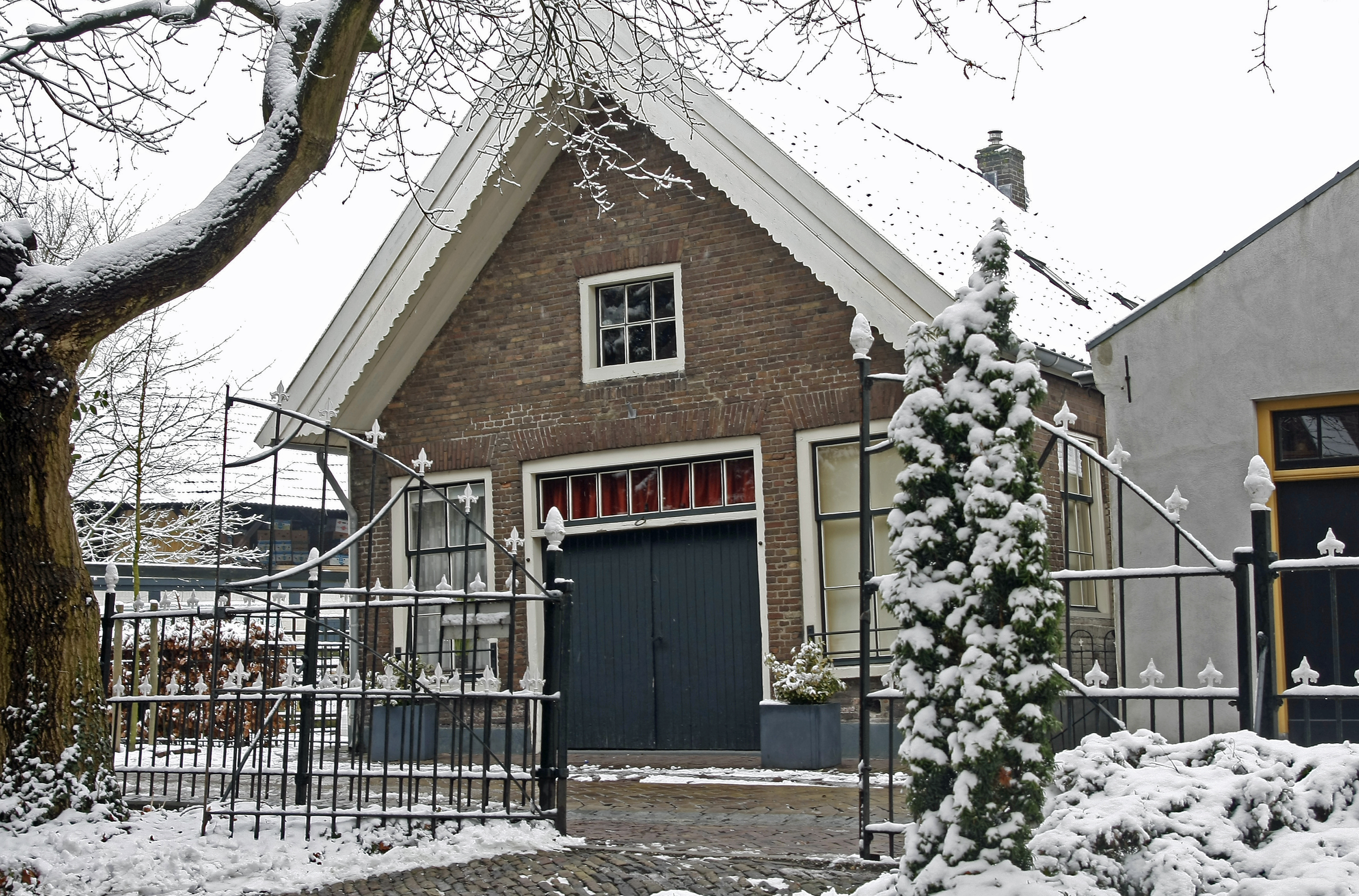
Former forge

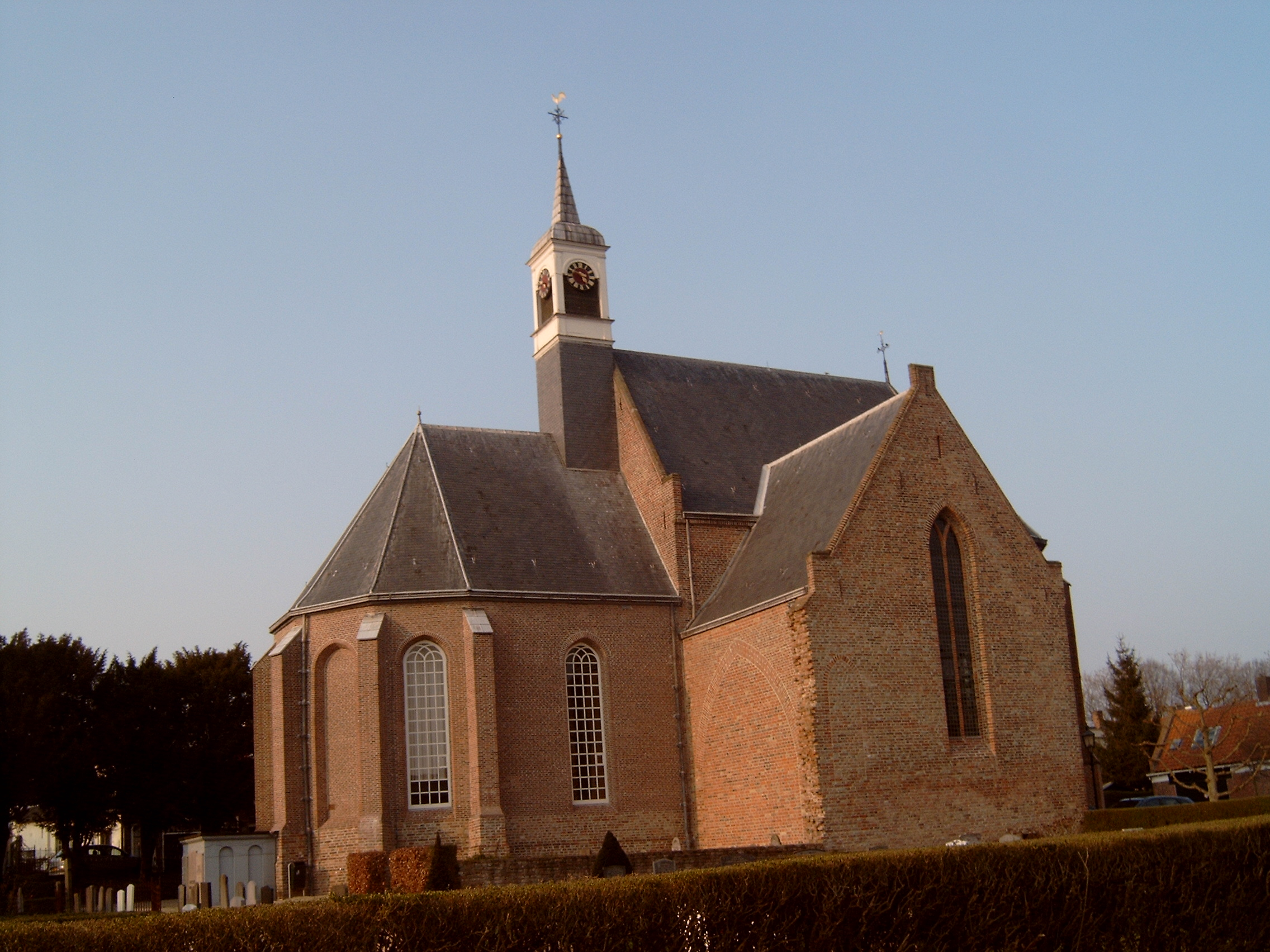
Dutch Reformed church

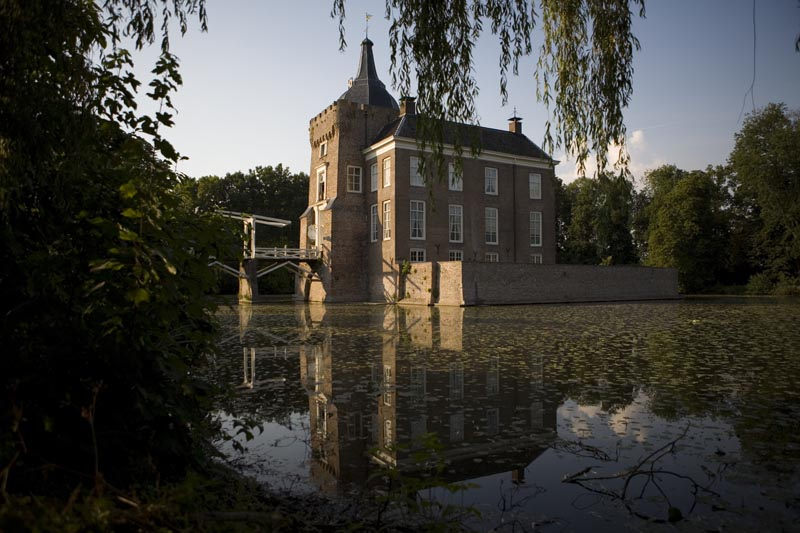
Heukelum Castle

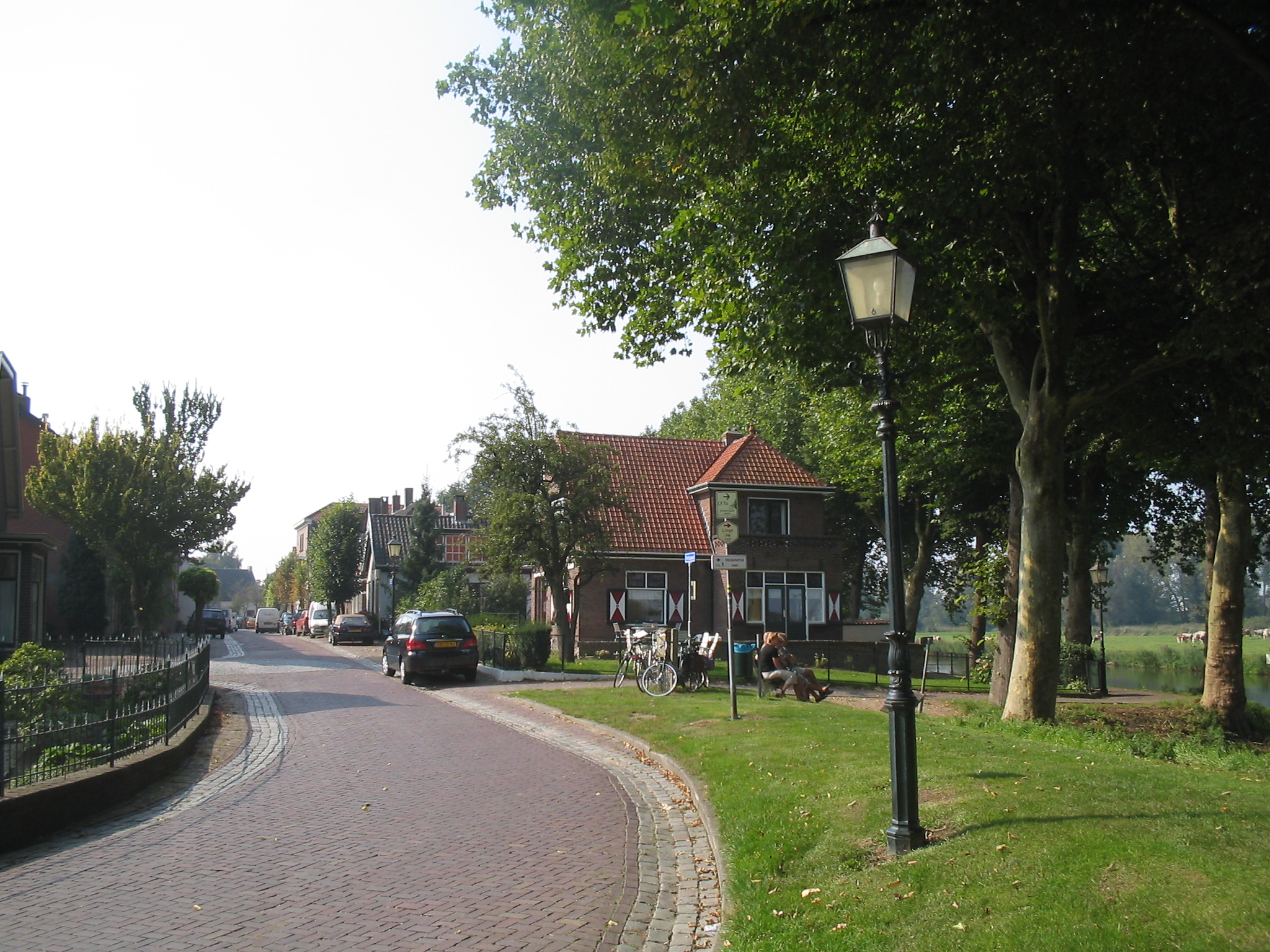
Street view
