= Spijk, West Betuwe =

Spijk
- Village
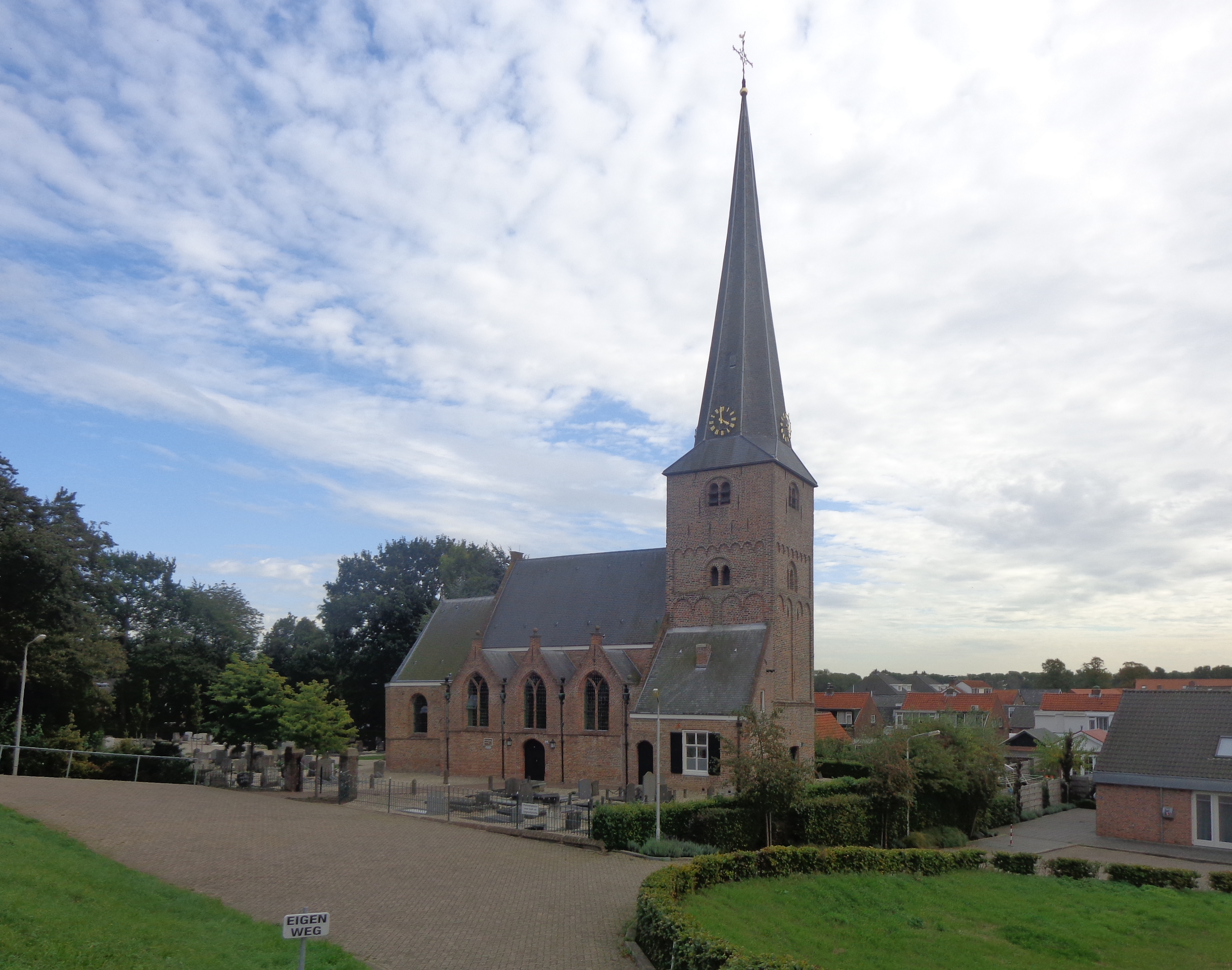
- Church of Spijk

- Location in the Netherlands Spijk (Netherlands)
- Coordinates: 51°51′18″N 5°0′28″E
- Country: Netherlands
- Province: Gelderland
- Municipality: West Betuwe

Area
  - Total: 1.99 km^{2} (0.77 sq mi)
- Elevation: 2 m (6.6 ft)

Population (2021)
  - Total: 920
  - Density: 460/km^{2} (1,200/sq mi)
- Time zone: UTC+1 (CET)
  - Summer (DST): UTC+2 (CEST)
- Postal code: 4211
- Dialing code: 0316

Spijk is a village in the Dutch province of Gelderland. It is a part of the municipality of West Betuwe, about 3 km northeast of Gorinchem.

Spijk was a separate municipality between 1817–1855, when it became part of Heukelum. At that time, it was still part of the province of South Holland.

== History ==
It was first mentioned in 1135 as Wichero de Spic, and means foreland. The village developed as a stretched out dike village along the Linge. The tower of the Dutch Reformed Church was built around 1250 and enlarged around 1500. The church dates from around 1500. It was restored between 1965 and 1969. Spijk was home to 392 people in 1840.

== Gallery ==
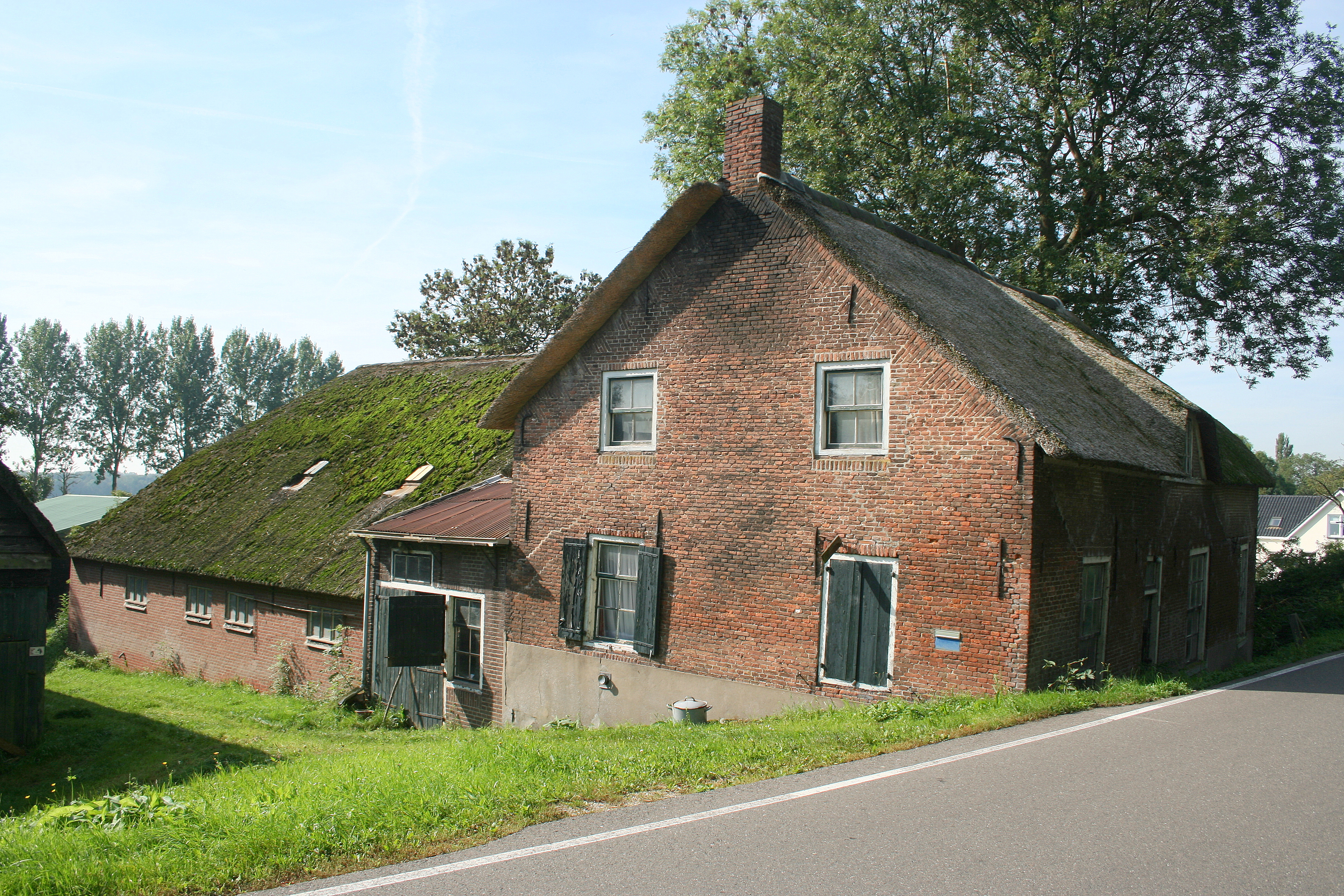
Farm in Spijk

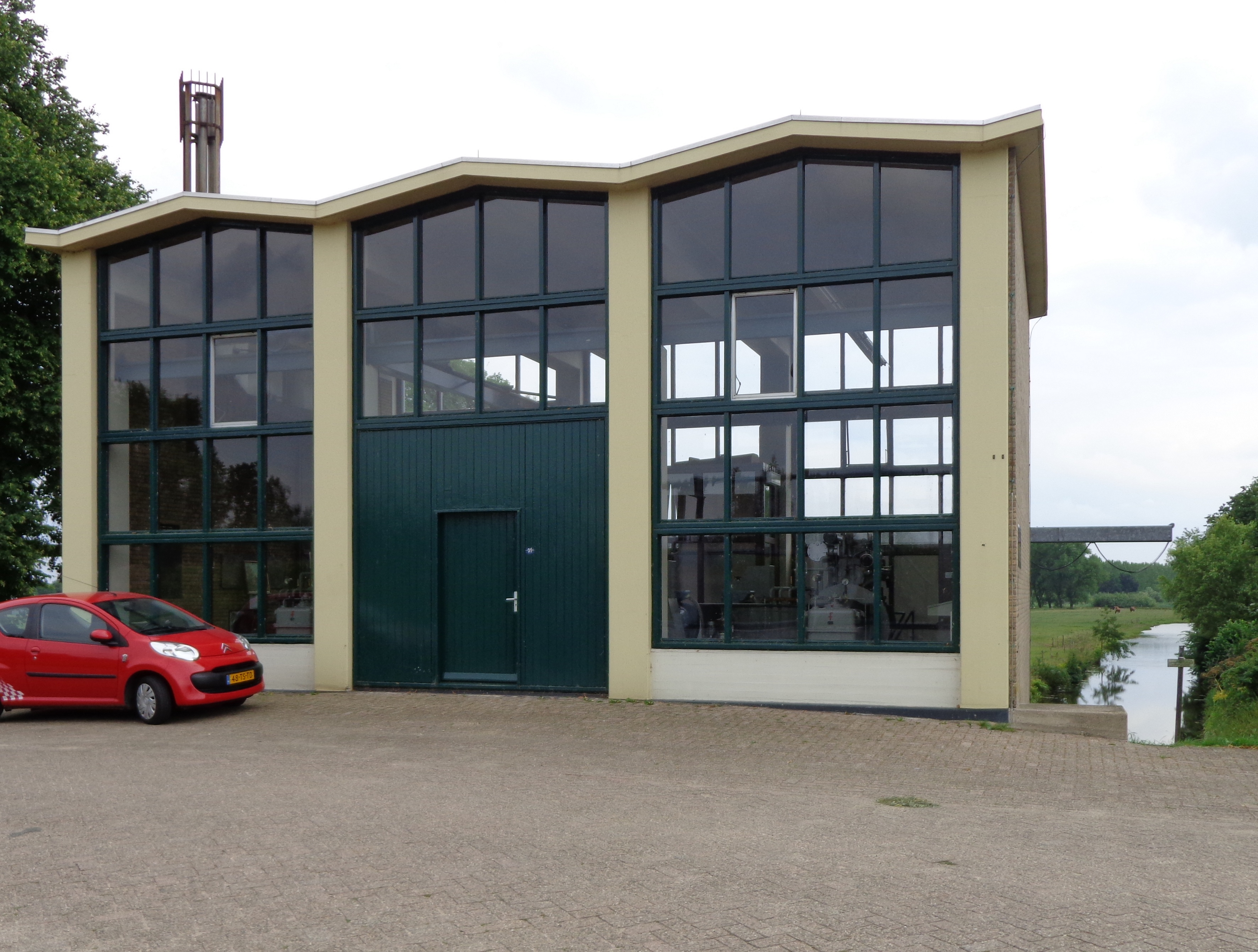
Pumping station

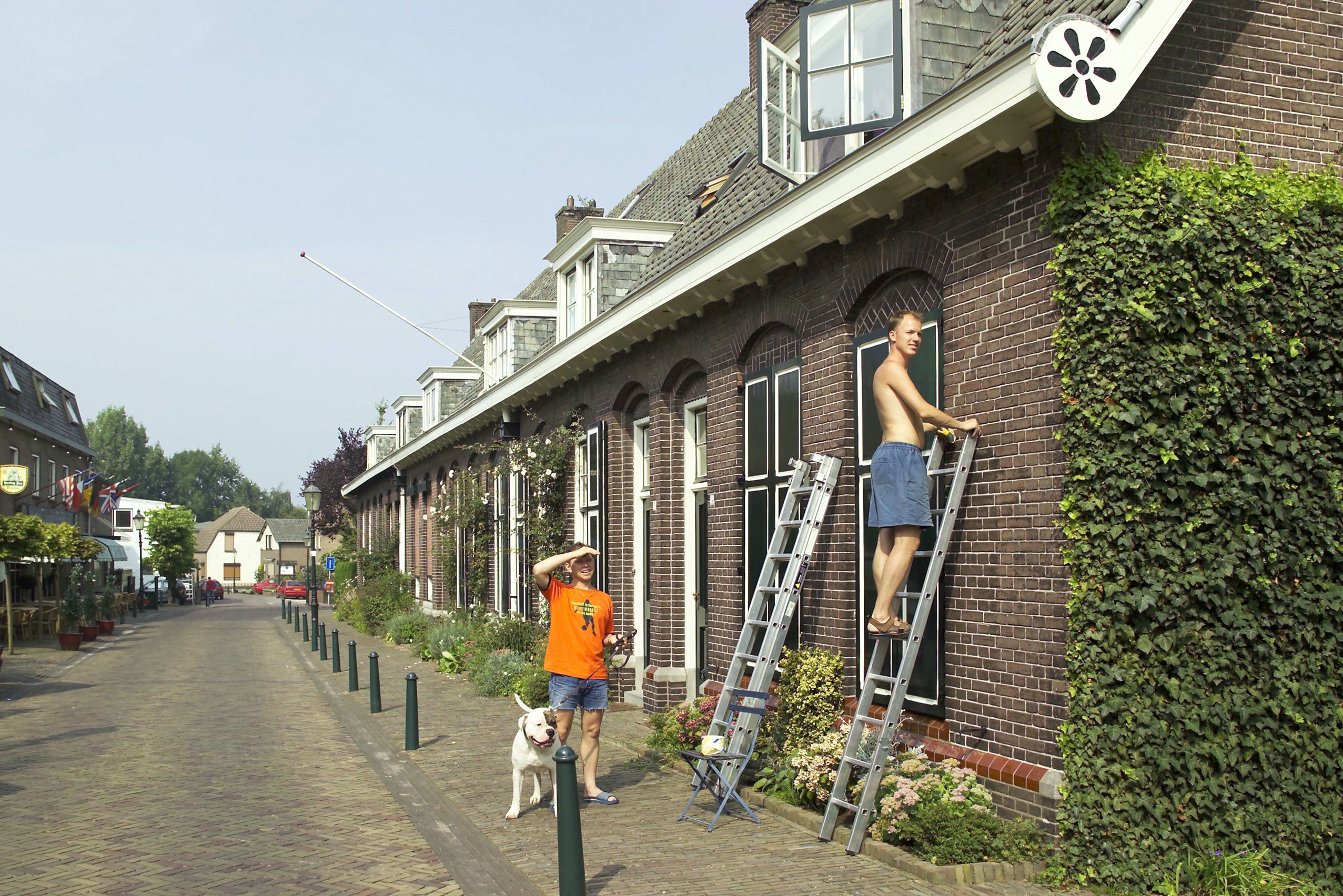
Worker's houses

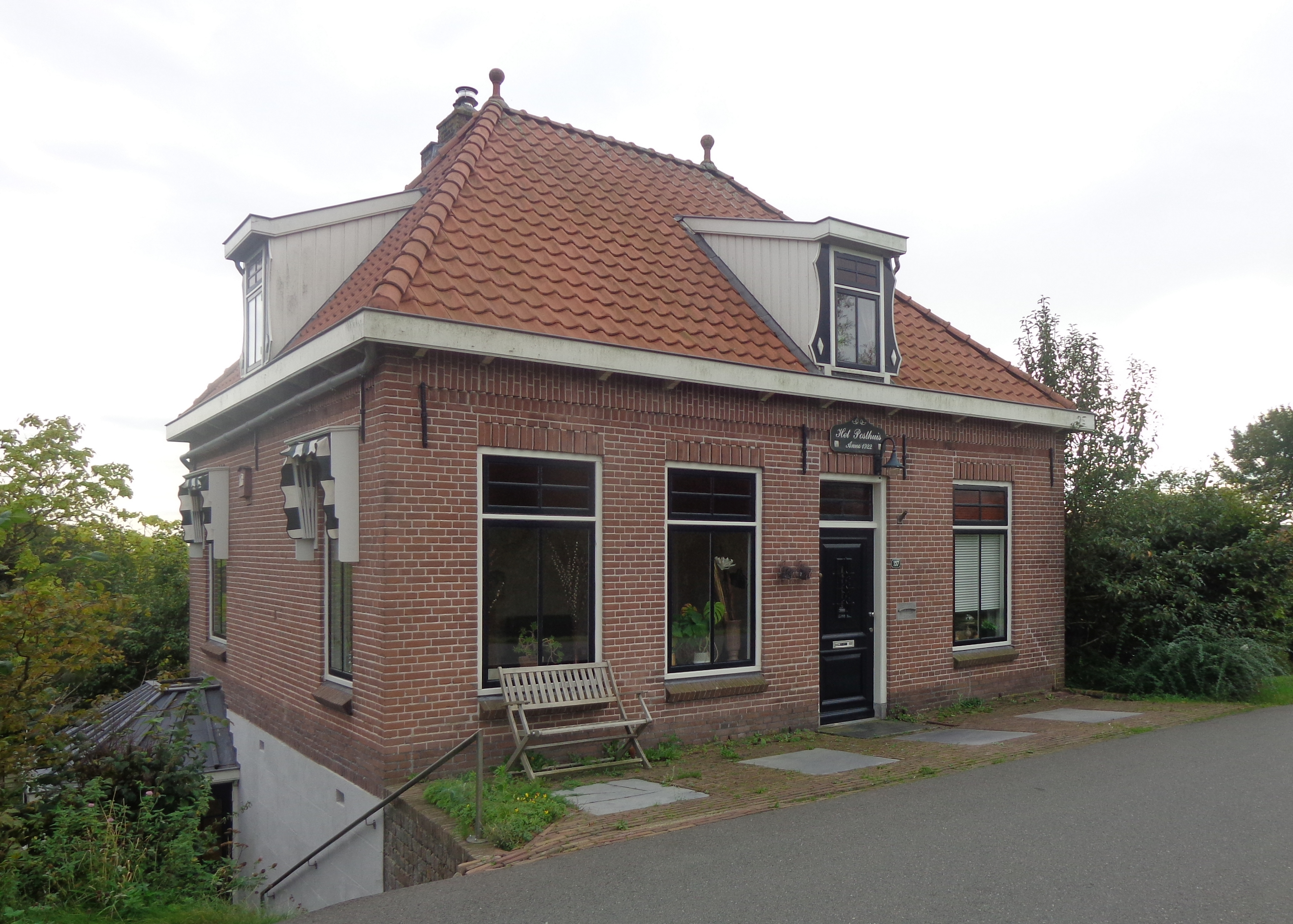
House on the dike
