= West Betuwe =

- Municipality
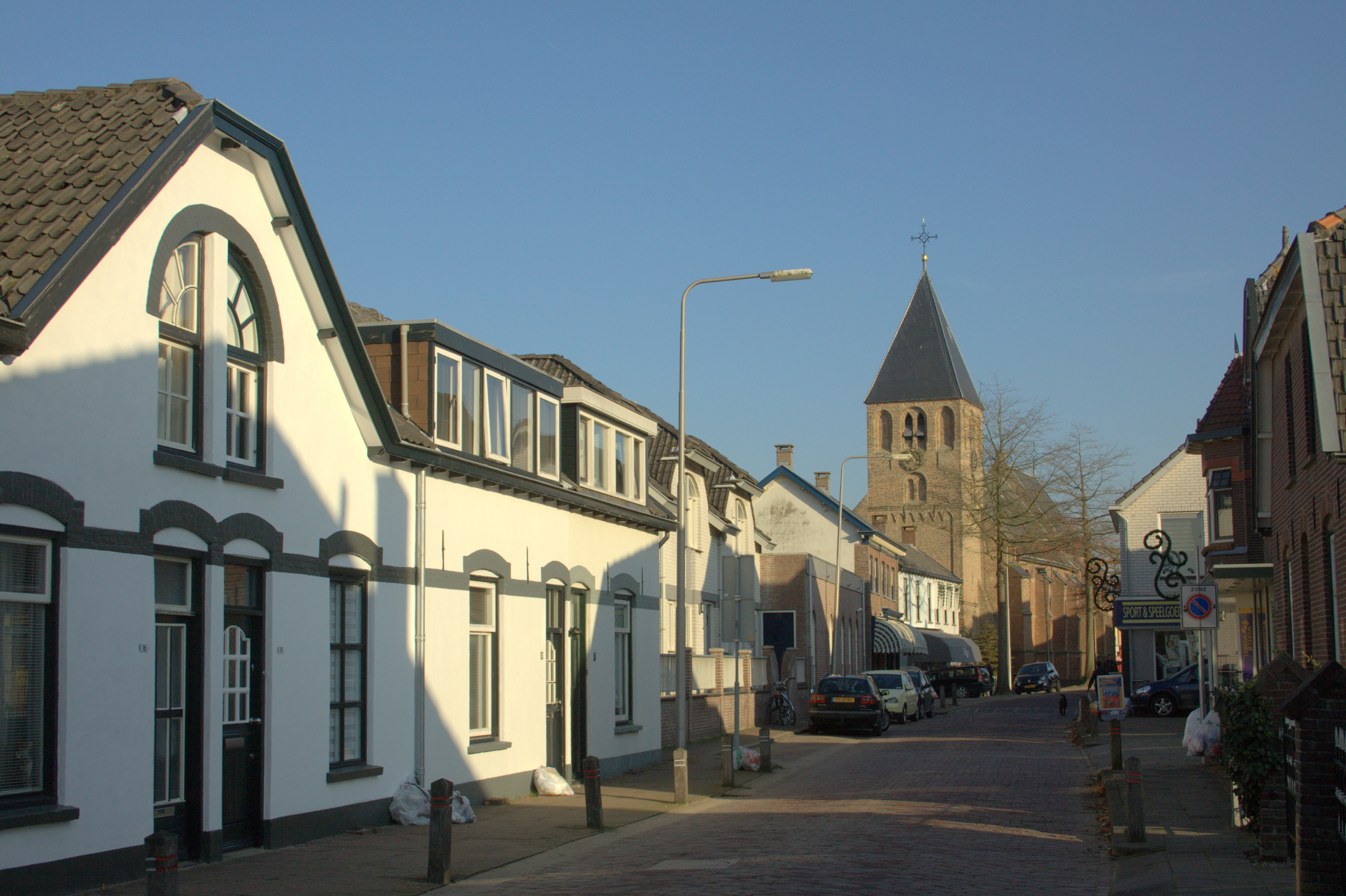
- Geldermalsen

- Flag Coat of arms

- Location in Gelderland
- Coordinates: 51°53′N 5°17′E
- Country: Netherlands
- Province: Gelderland
- Established: 1 January 2019

Government
  - Body: Municipal council
  - Mayor: Servass Stoop (SGP)

Area
  - Total: 229.12 km^{2} (88.46 sq mi)
  - Land: 216.12 km^{2} (83.44 sq mi)
  - Water: 13.00 km^{2} (5.02 sq mi)

Population (July 2019)
  - Total: 50,958
  - Density: 235.79/km^{2} (610.68/sq mi)
- Time zone: UTC+1 (CET)
  - Summer (DST): UTC+2 (CEST)
- Website: www.westbetuwe.nl

West Betuwe is a municipality in the Dutch province of Gelderland. West Betuwe had 51.948 inhabitants on 1 January 2022.

The municipality was formed on 1 January 2019 by the merger of the municipalities Geldermalsen, Neerijnen, Lingewaal.

== Topography ==
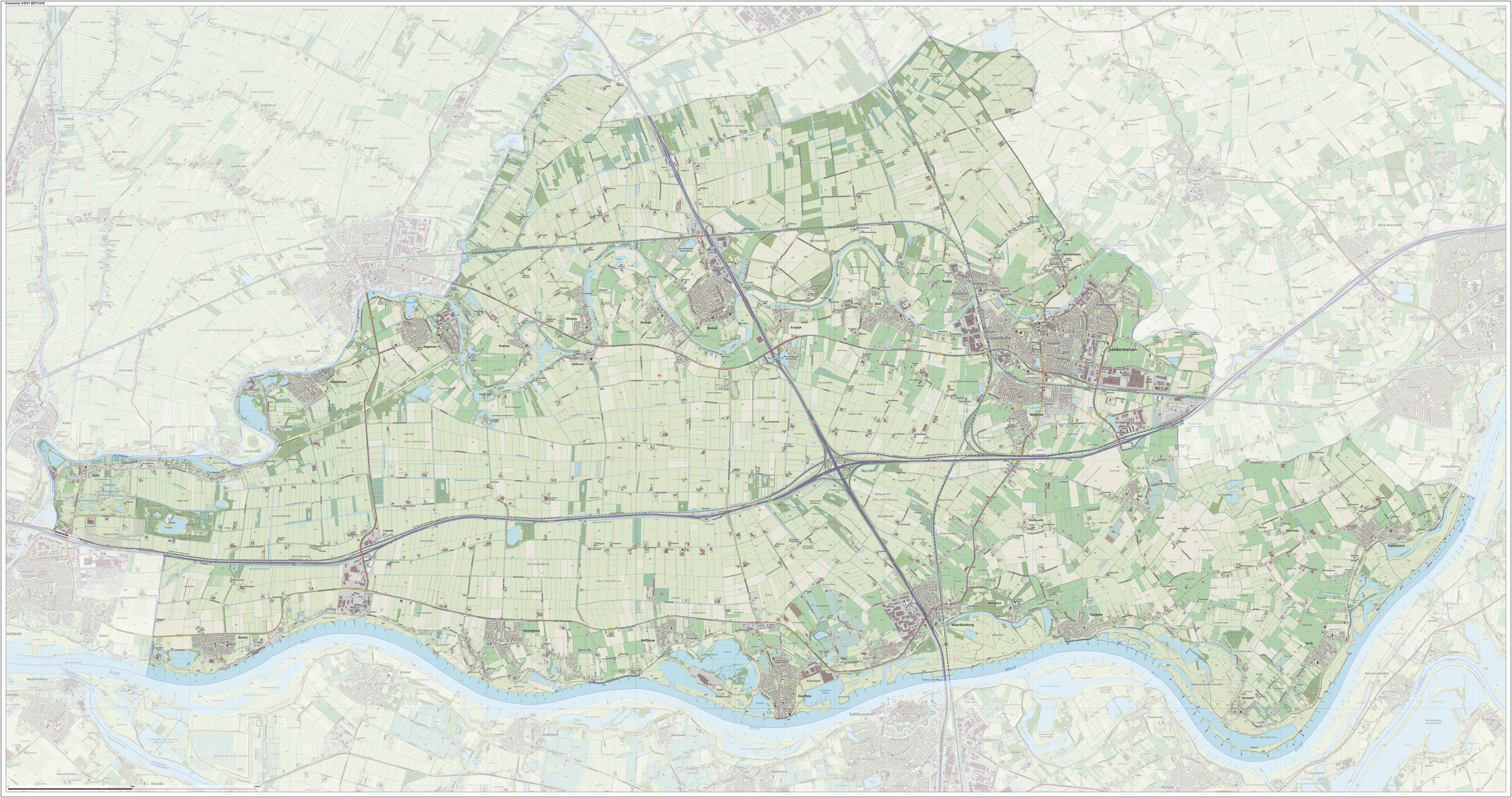
Dutch topographic map of the municipality of West Betuwe, 2018

== Notable people ==
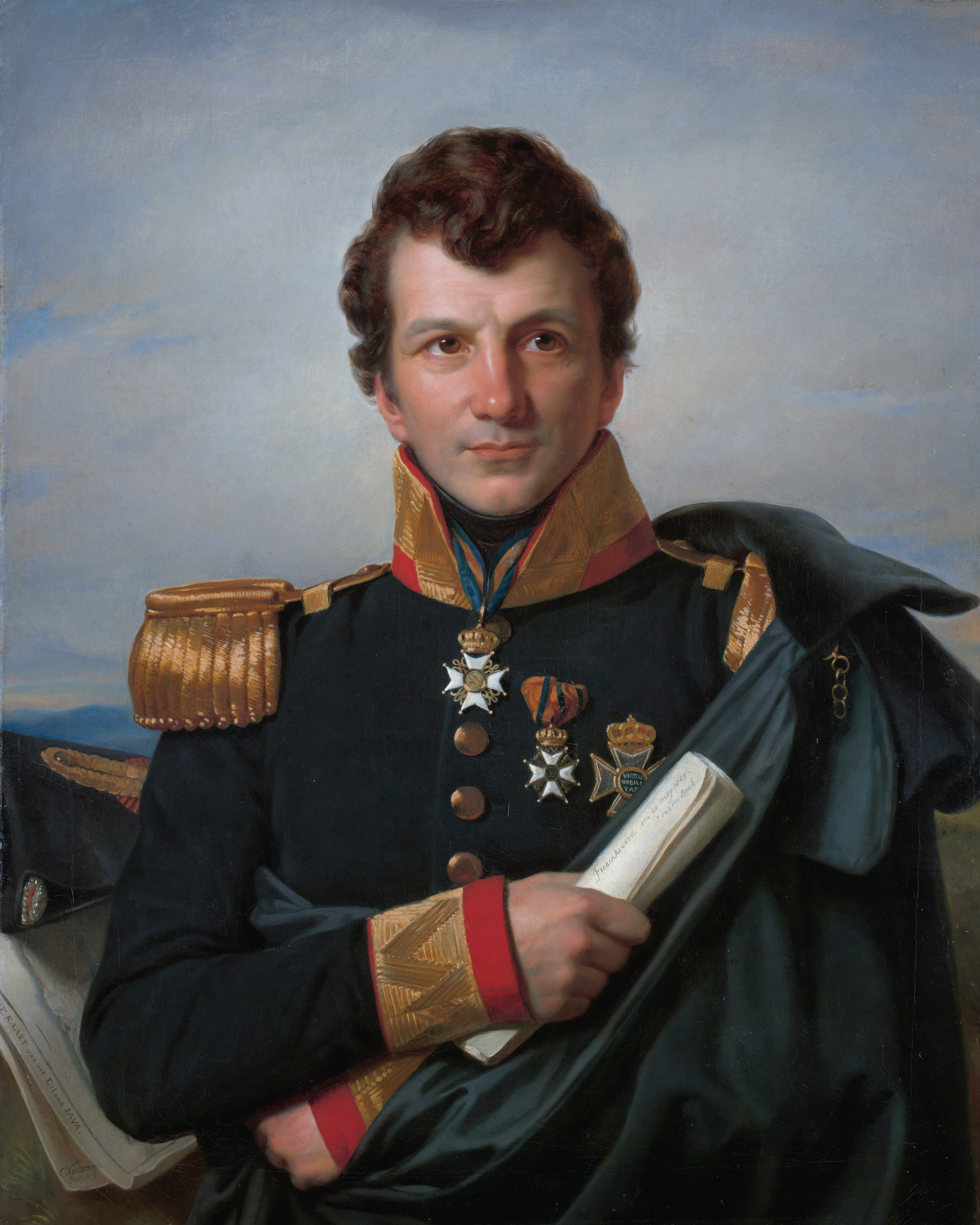
Johannes van den Bosch, 1829

- Dirk Willems (born in Asperen - died 1569) a Dutch martyred Anabaptist
- Cornelius Jansen (1585 in Acquoy – 1638) the Catholic Bishop of Ypres, father of Jansenism
- Johannes, Count van den Bosch (1780 in Herwijnen – 1844) an officer and politician; Governor-General of the Dutch East Indies 1830–1833
- Jan Karel van den Broek (1814 in Herwijnen – 1865) a physician based at Nagasaki, in Bakumatsu
- Otto Willem Arnold baron van Verschuer (1927 in Beesd – 2014) a Dutch politician

=== Sport ===
- Jan Kleyn (1925 in Asperen – 2009) a sprinter, competed at the 1948 Summer Olympics
- Hendrik Pieter de Jongh (born 1970 in Asperen) a football manager and former player
- Léon van Bon (born 1972 in Asperen) a retired road racing cyclist, silver medallist at the 1992 Summer Olympics
- Selma Poutsma (born 1999) from Deil, a speed skater and gold medallist at the 2022 Winter Olympics

== Gallery ==
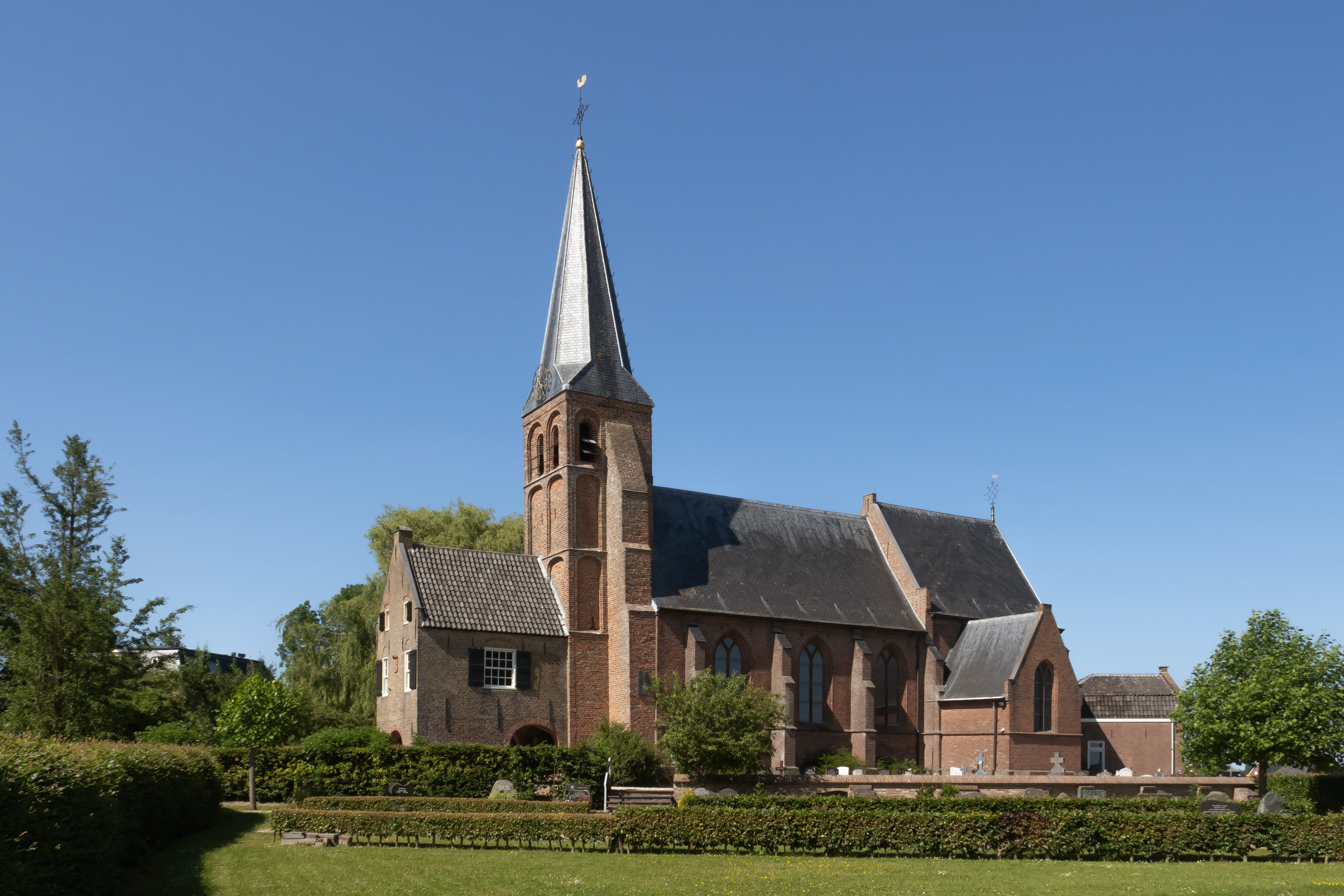
Gellicum, church: the Onze Lieve Vrouwe Geboortekerk

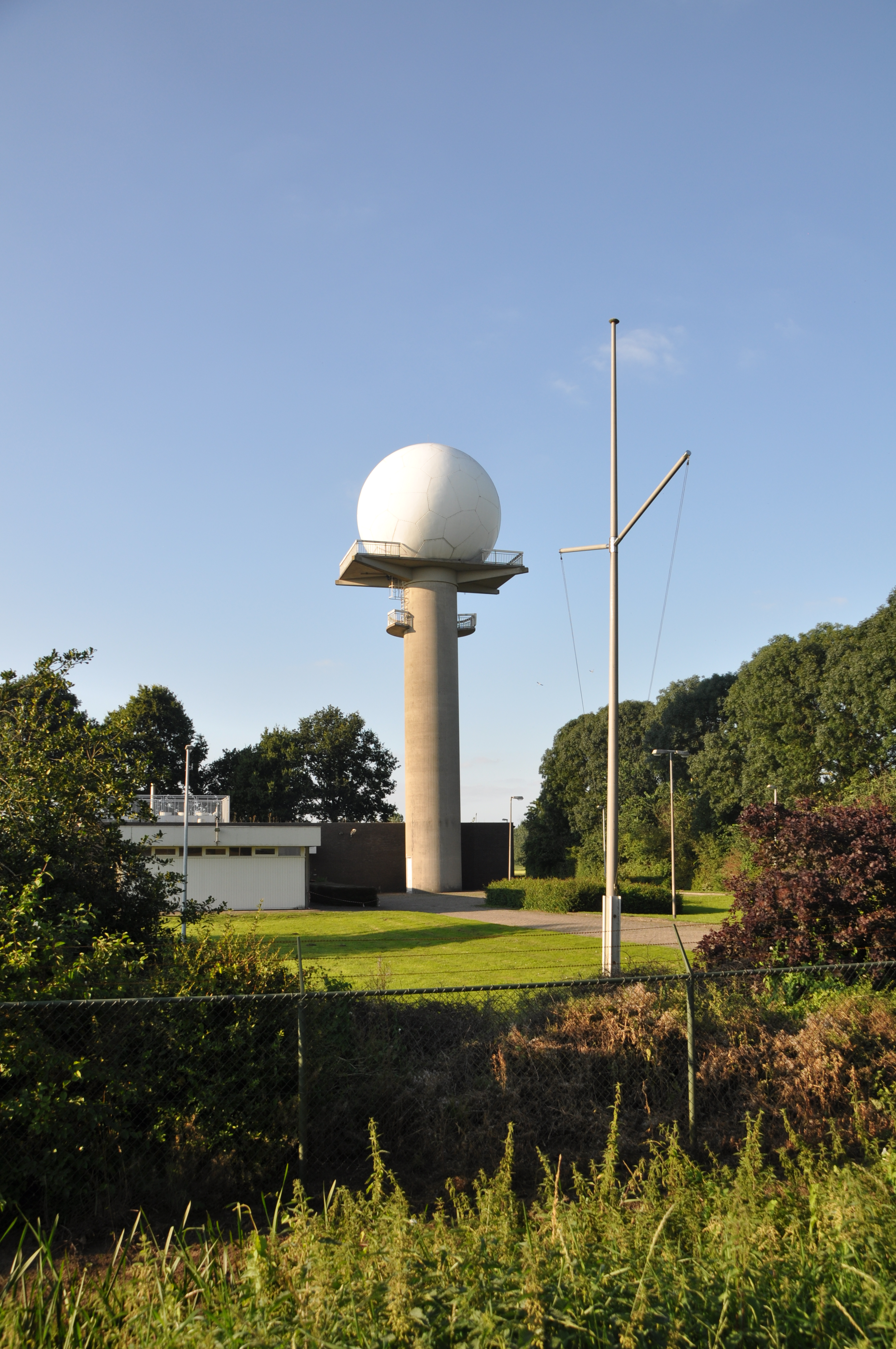
Herwijnen, Radar

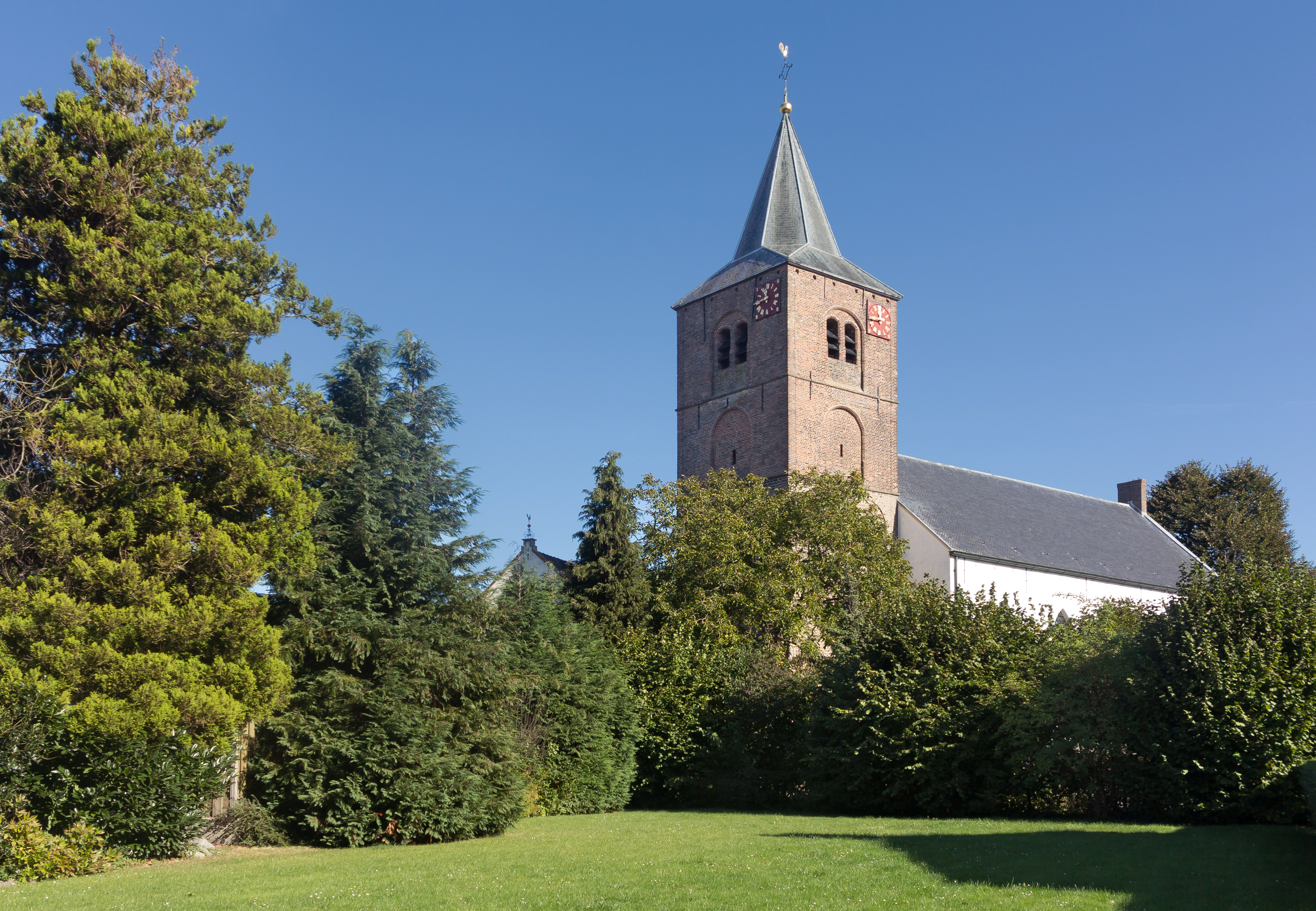
Deil, reformed church

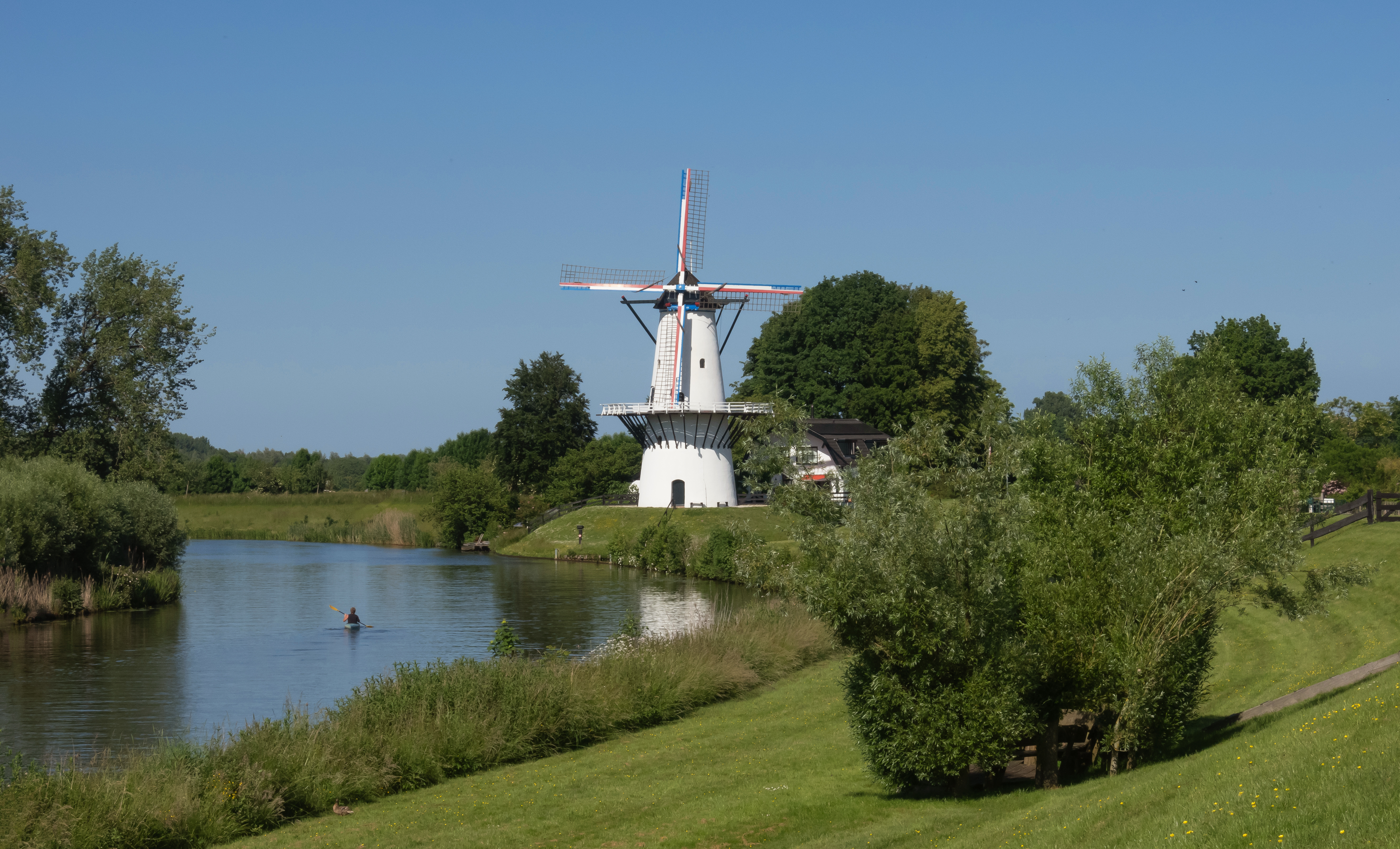
Deil, windmill: molen de Vlinder

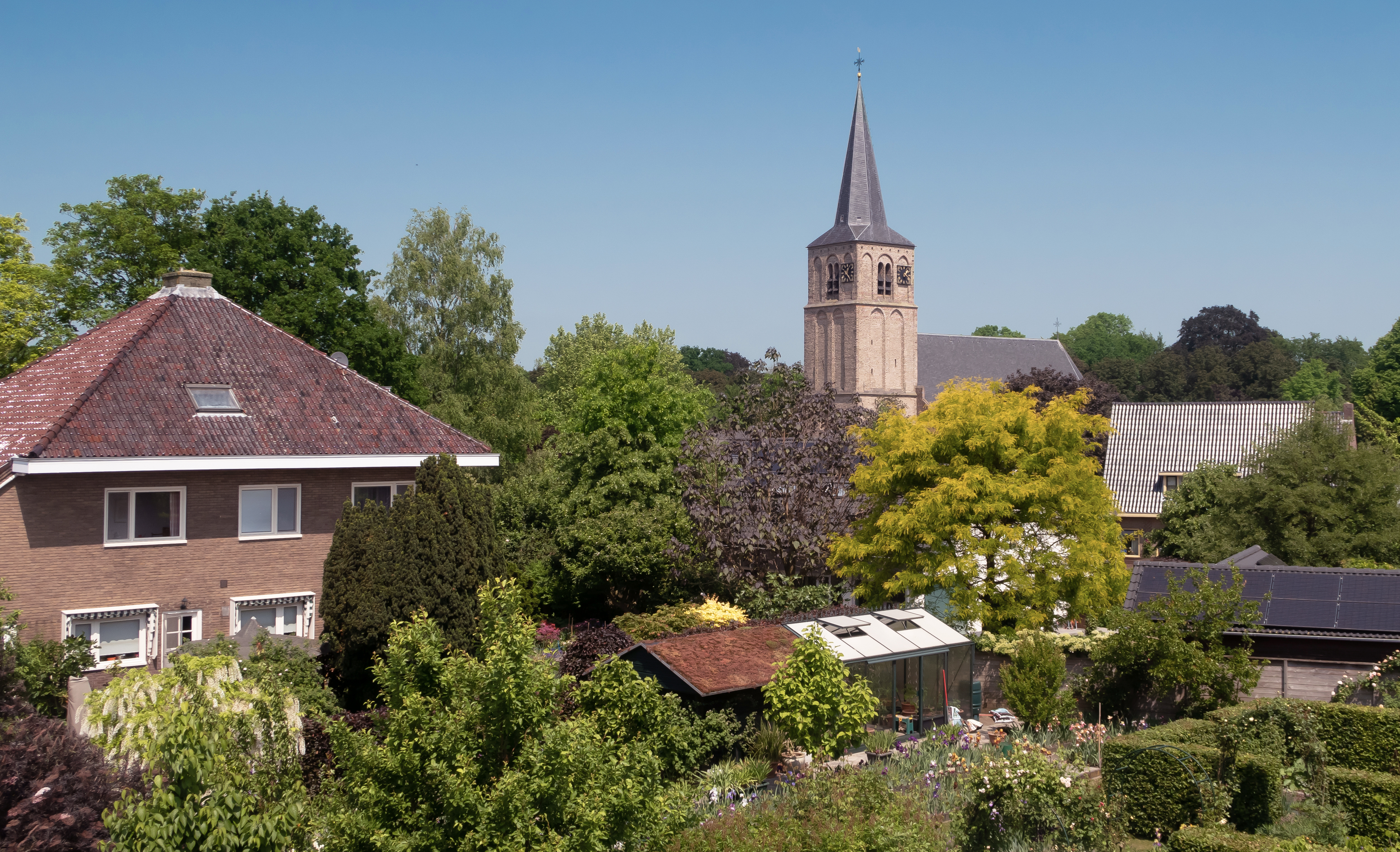
Ophemert, view to the village

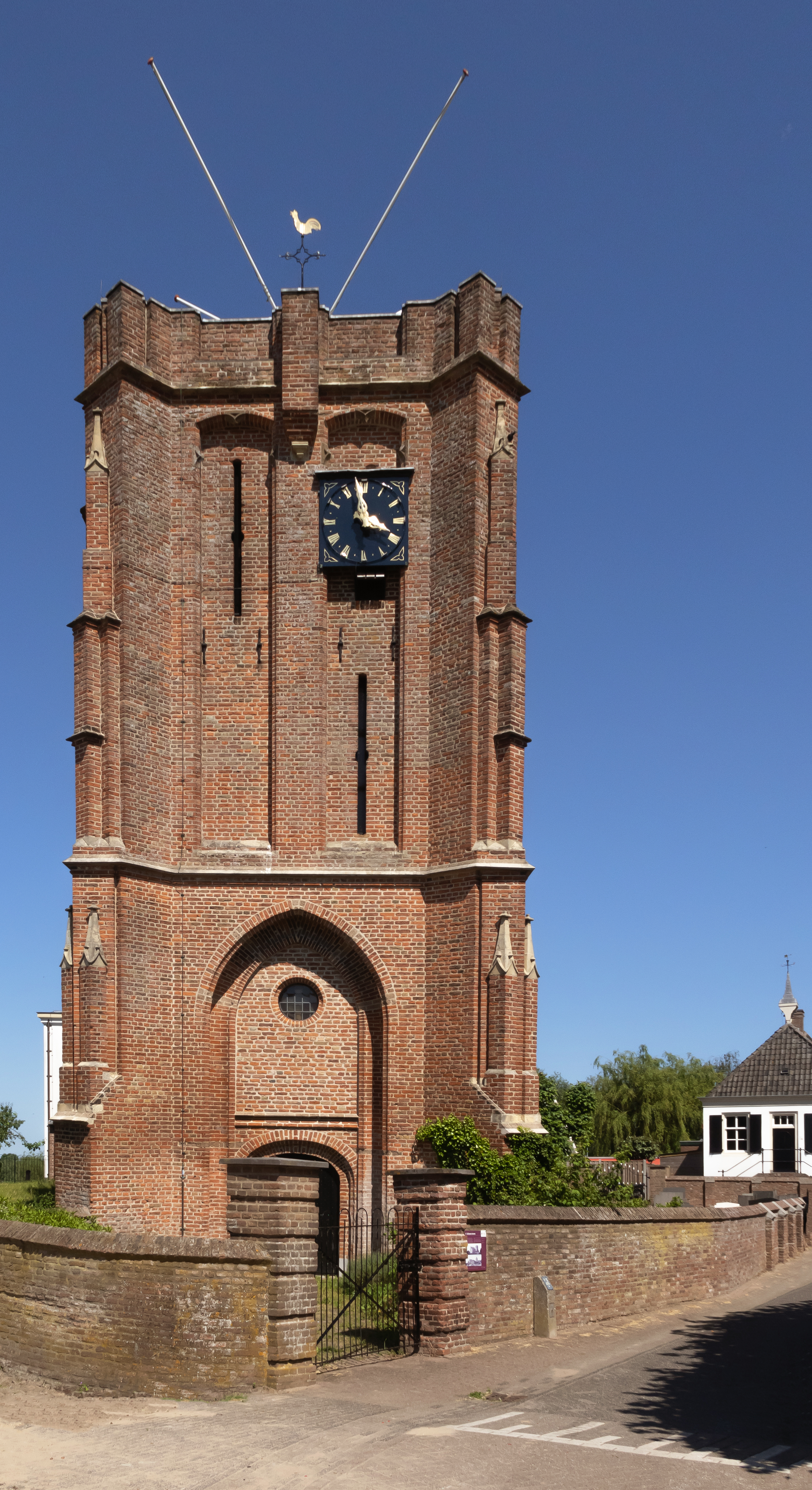
Acquoy, church

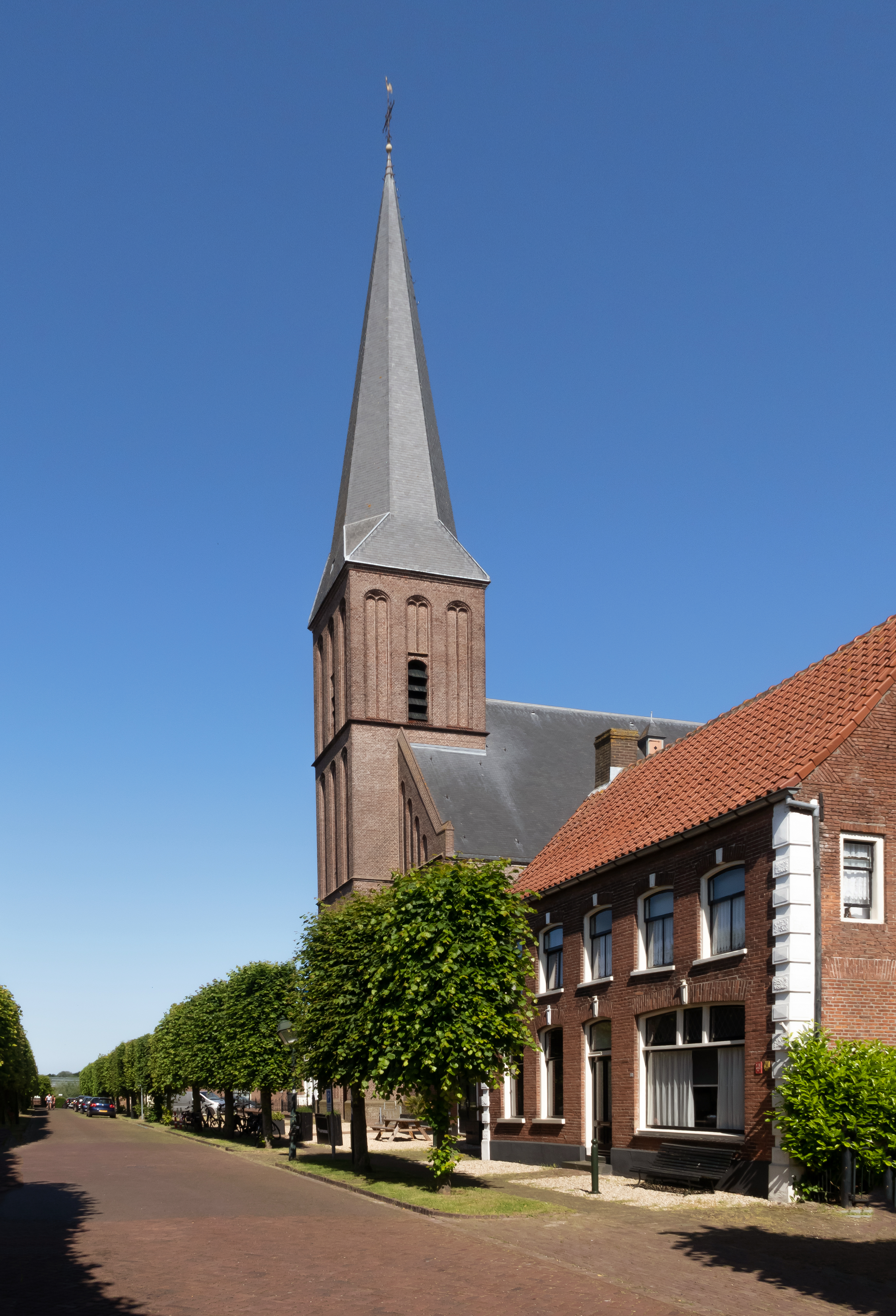
Beesd, church

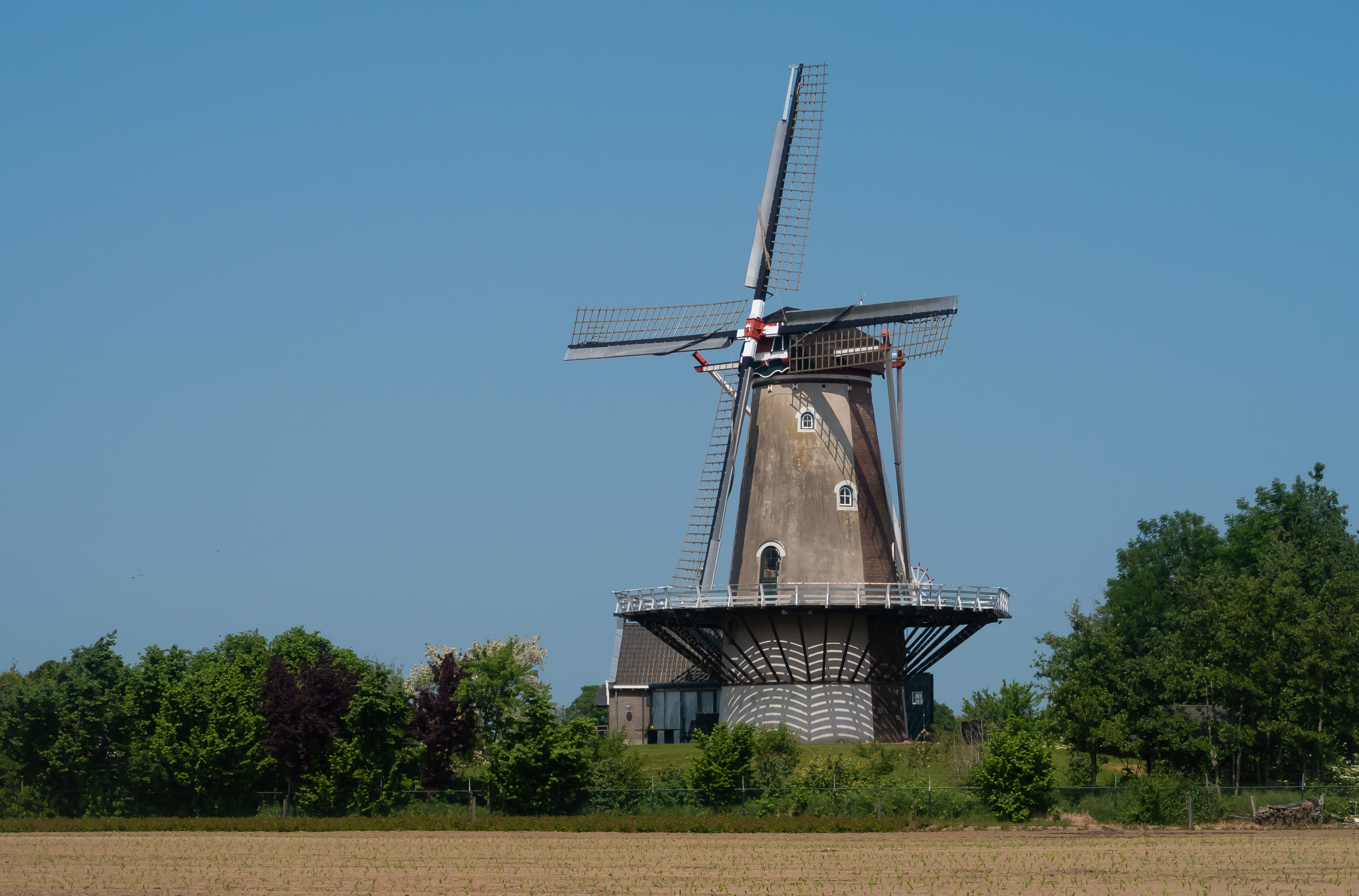
Varik, windmill

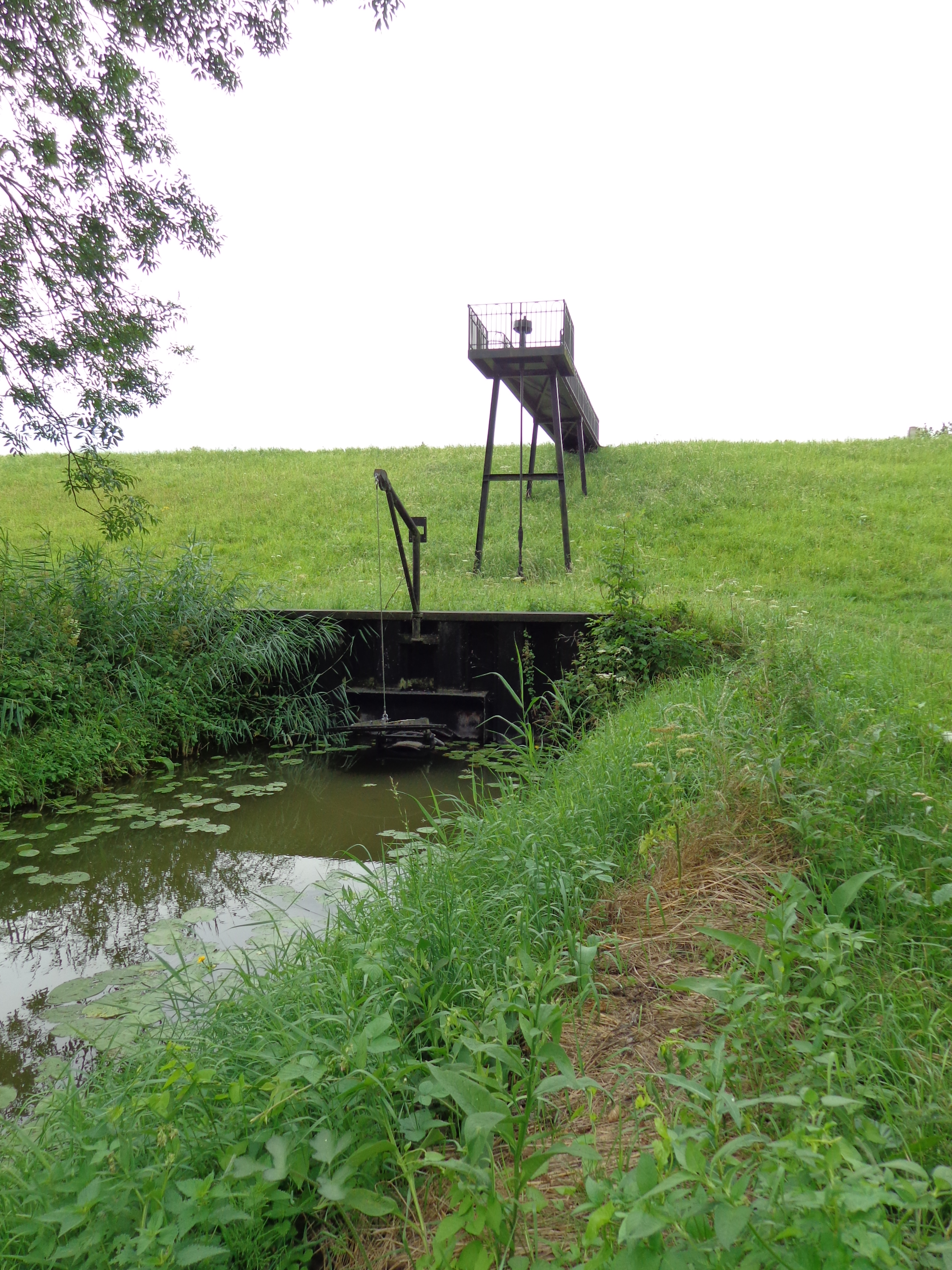
Nieuwe Zuiderlingedijk Keersluisje

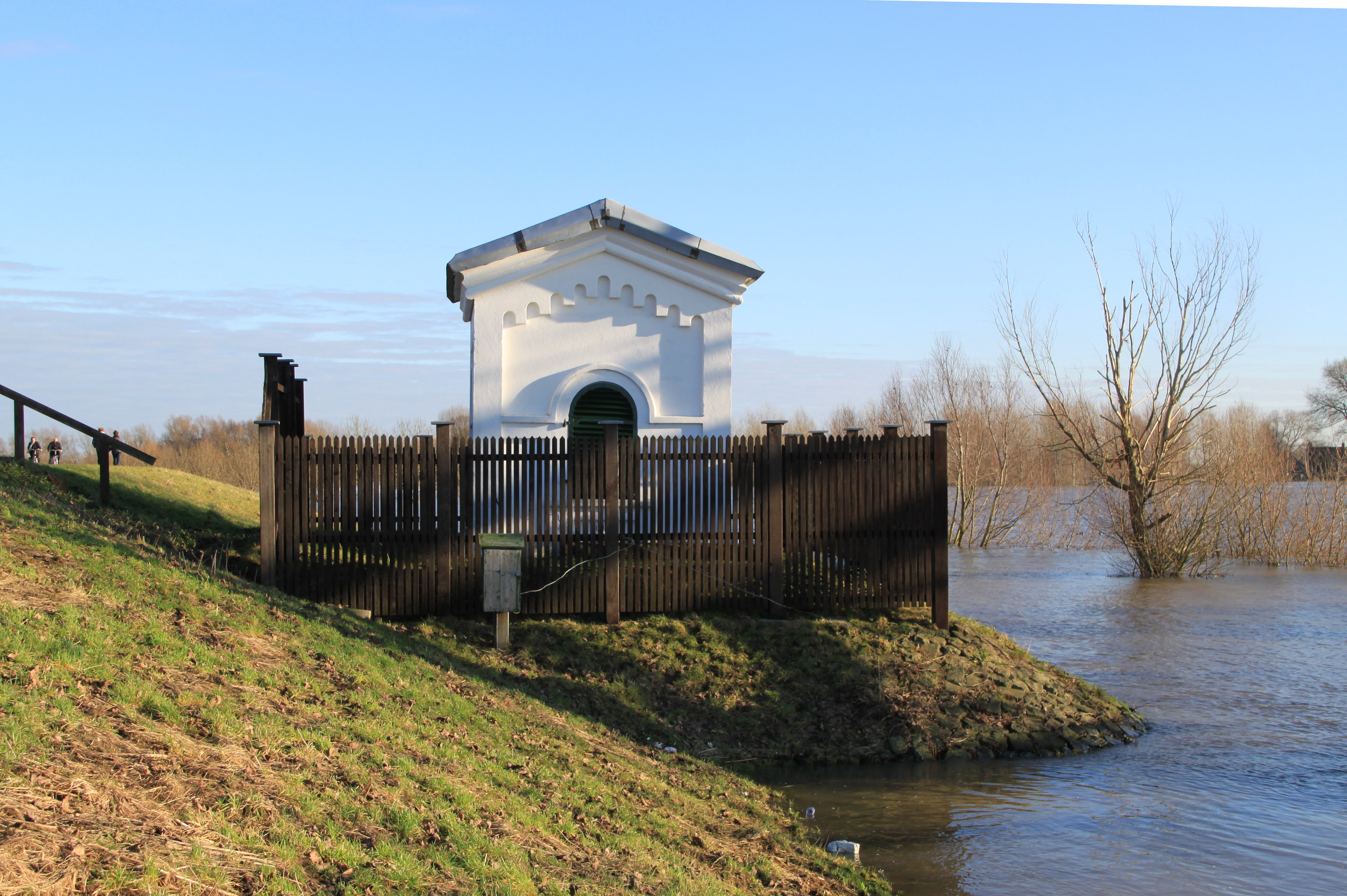
Water level recording shed
