= Van As =

Van As is a Dutch toponymic surname meaning "from/of As". There are a number of places named As, Asch, Asse, Assen, and Ast in the Low Countries to which "As" may refer to. People with this name or the variant Van Ass include:

- Filip van As (born 1966), Dutch Christian Union politician
- Gerard van As (born 1944), Dutch "List Pim Fortuyn" politician
- Naomi van As (born 1983), Dutch field hockey player
- Paul van Ass (born 1960), Dutch field hockey coach, unrelated to Naomi
- Seve van Ass (born 1992), Dutch field hockey player, son of Paul

== See also ==
- Van Assche, Dutch surname of similar origin
- S v Van As, an important case in South African criminal law
