= Ommeren =

- Village
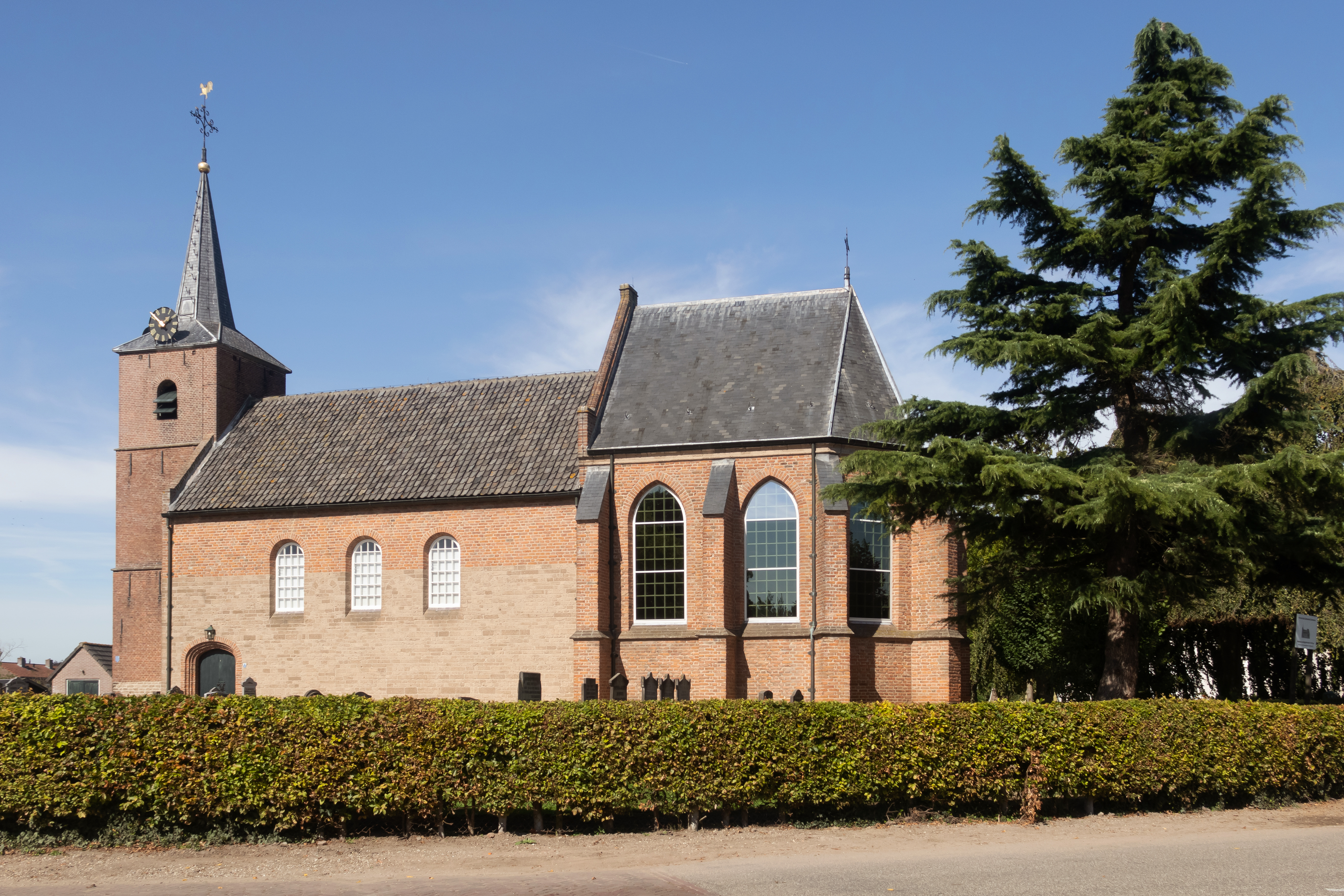
- The church of Ommeren

- Location in the province of Gelderland Ommeren (Netherlands)
- Coordinates: 51°57′N 5°30′E
- Country: Netherlands
- Province: Gelderland
- Municipality: Buren

Area
  - Total: 1.20 km^{2} (0.46 sq mi)
- Elevation: 5 m (16 ft)

Population (2021)
  - Total: 405
  - Density: 337/km^{2} (874/sq mi)
- Time zone: UTC+1 (CET)
  - Summer (DST): UTC+2 (CEST)
- Postal code: 4032
- Dialing code: 0344

Ommeren is a village in the Dutch province of Gelderland. It is a part of the municipality of Buren, and lies about 9 km (5.6 mi) northeast of Tiel.

== History ==
It was first mentioned in the 9th century as Homeru. The etymology is unclear. In 1840, it was home to 413 people.

In January 2023, Ommeren made the news as would-be treasure-hunters descended on the village searching for riches potentially worth millions, allegedly hidden by Nazi soldiers during World War II. It was triggered by an old map, believed to reveal where German soldiers may have buried ammunition boxes full of looted diamonds, rubies, gold and silver. The hand-drawn map complete with a red X to mark the burial spot was part of a case file made public by the Dutch National Archive after a 75-year confidentiality period. It had been sketched by a German paratrooper interviewed by a Dutch institute after the war. The village was near the Allied front line during Operation Market Garden in 1944, an airborne attempt to create a land route into northern Germany. A subsequent officially sanctioned dig on 1 May 2023 found no treasure, rather a World War II-era bullet, some twisted scrap metal, a crumpled car wheel and muddy boots.

== Gallery ==
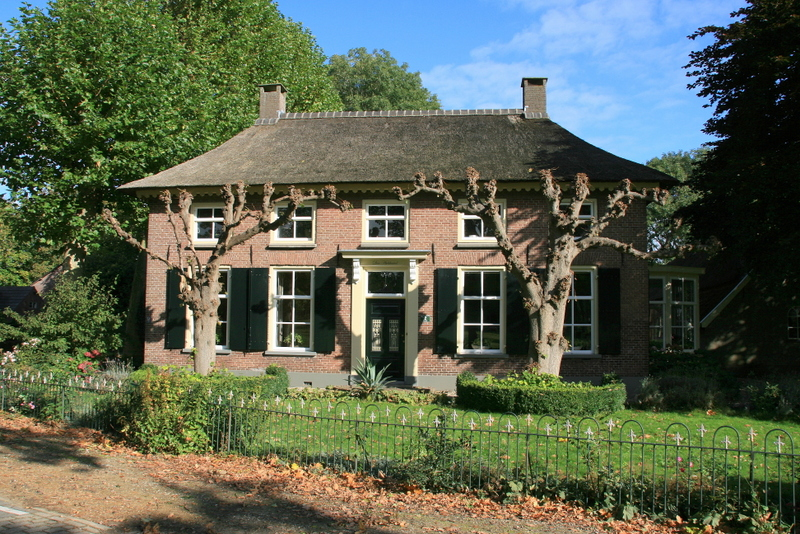
Farm "Den Aschheuvel"

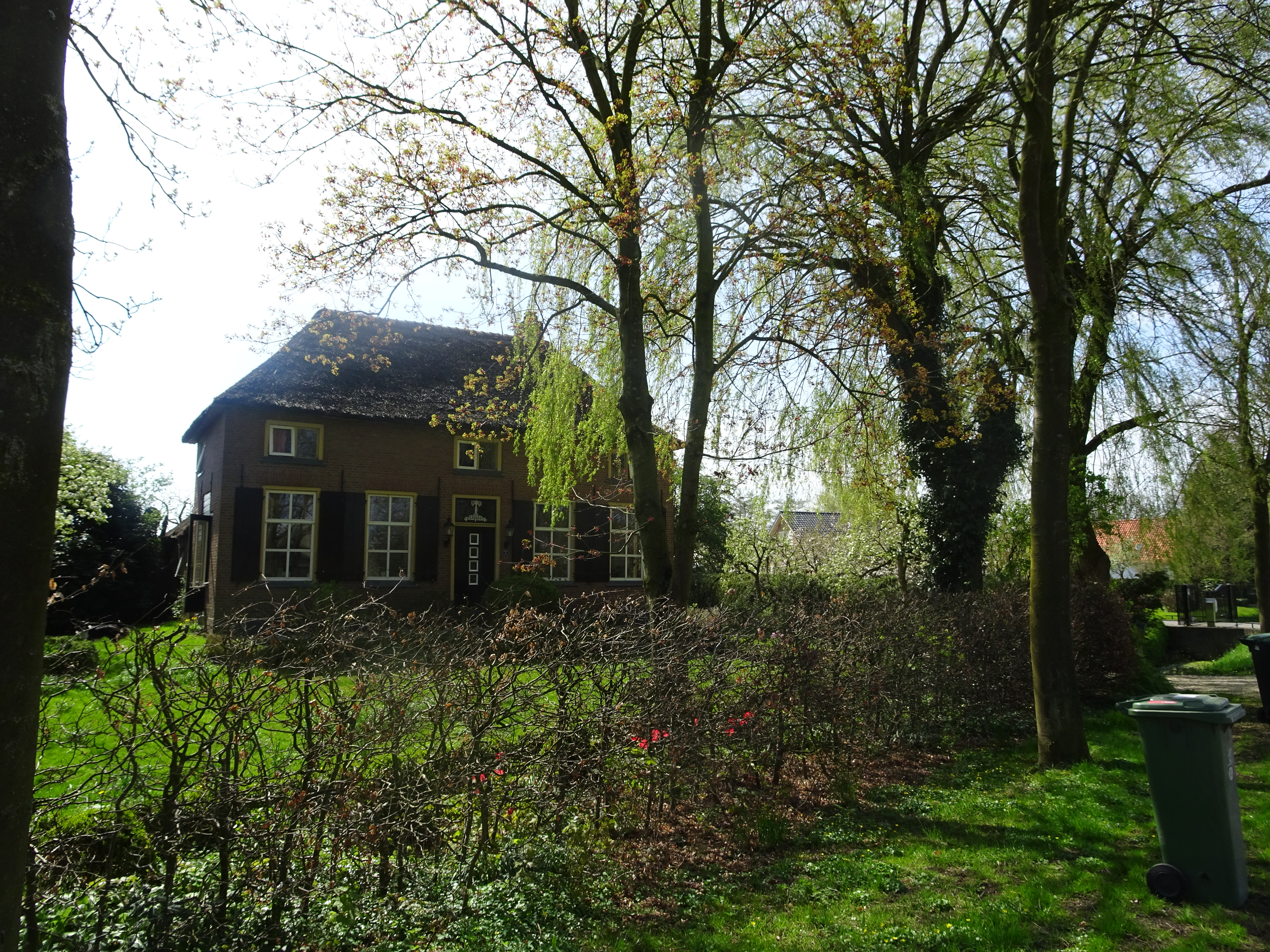
Farm in Ommeren

== See also ==
- Nazi gold train
