= Kerk-Avezaath =

- Village
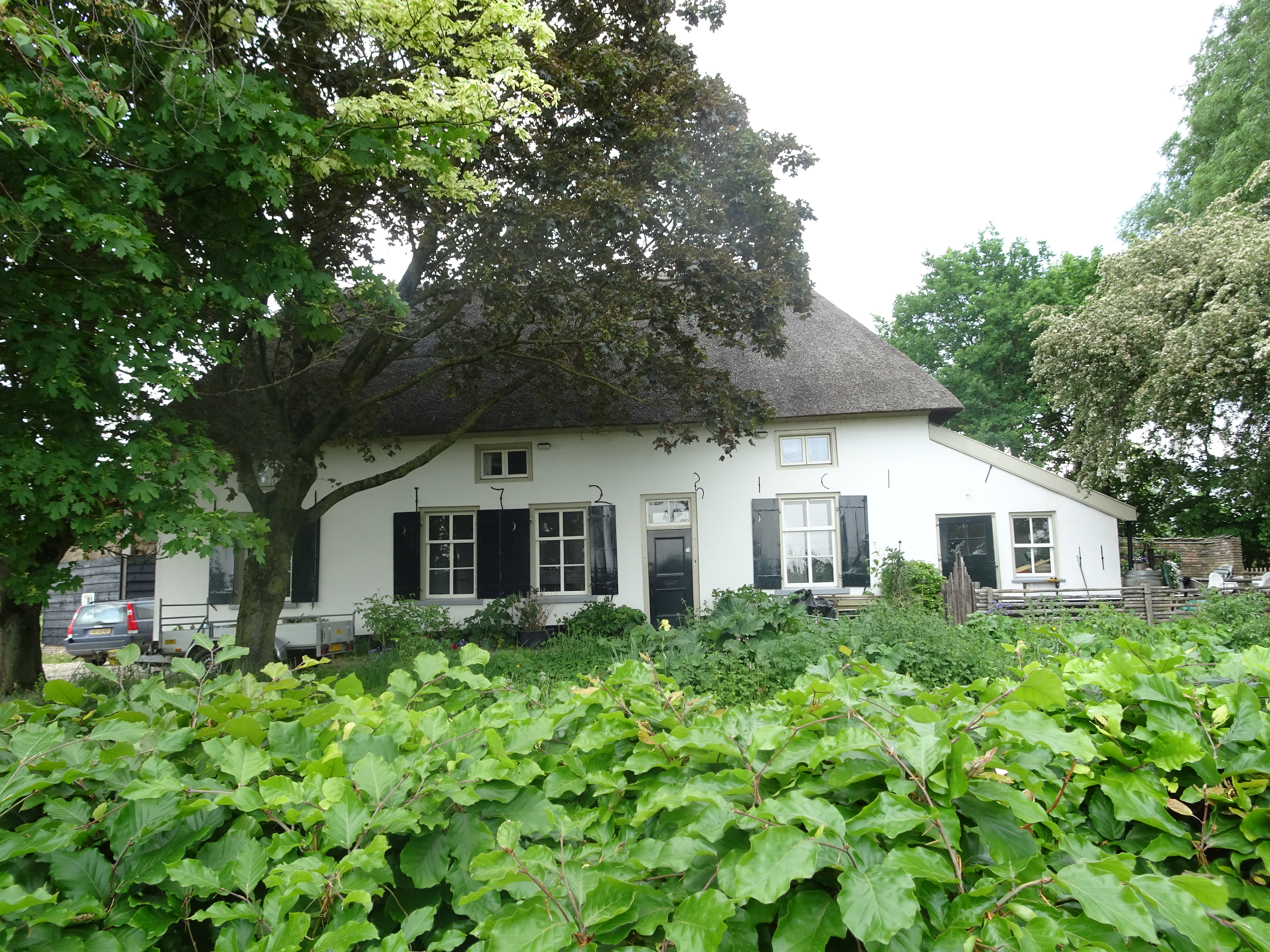
- Farm in Kerk-Avezaath

- Location in the province of Gelderland Kerk-Avezaath (Netherlands)
- Coordinates: 51°54′N 5°23′E
- Country: Netherlands
- Province: Gelderland
- Municipality: Buren

Area
  - Total: 2.44 km^{2} (0.94 sq mi)
- Elevation: 5 m (16 ft)

Population (2021)
  - Total: 1,235
  - Density: 506/km^{2} (1,310/sq mi)
- Time zone: UTC+1 (CET)
  - Summer (DST): UTC+2 (CEST)
- Postal code: 4012
- Dialing code: 0344

Kerk-Avezaath is a village in the Dutch province of Gelderland. It is a part of the municipality of Buren, and lies about 3 km west of Tiel.

A small part of the village (not counted in the statistics above) is part of the municipality of Tiel, and consists of about 60 houses.

== History ==
It was first mentioned in 850 as Auansati, and means "church at the house of Avo (person)". The village developed along two parallel roads on a stream, and a stretched esdorp developed. The tower of the Dutch Reformed Church dates from 1640 and has an 11th century base. The church dates from 1861 and has 14th century elements. In 1840, it was home to 449 people.

== Gallery ==
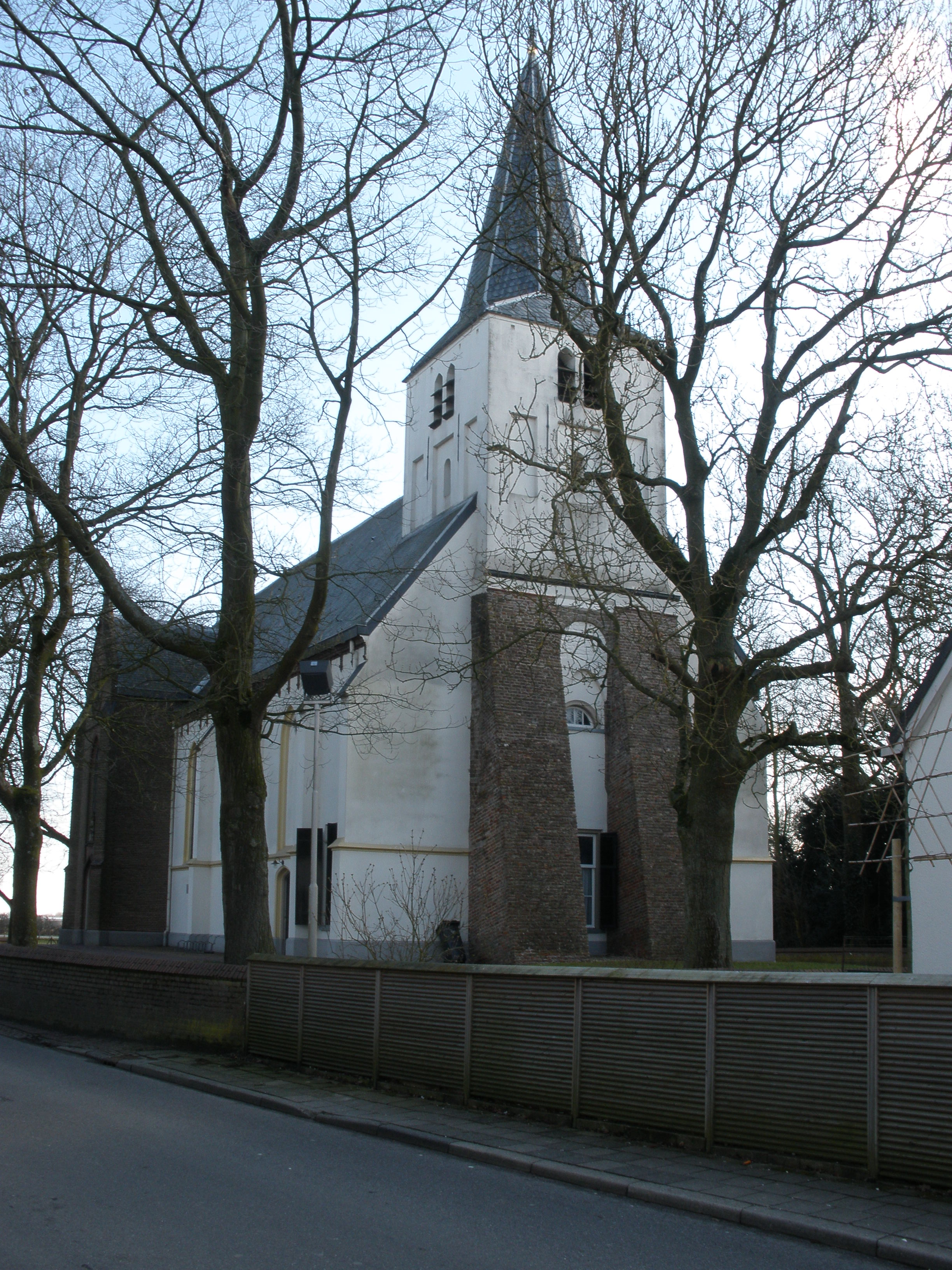
St. Lambertus Church

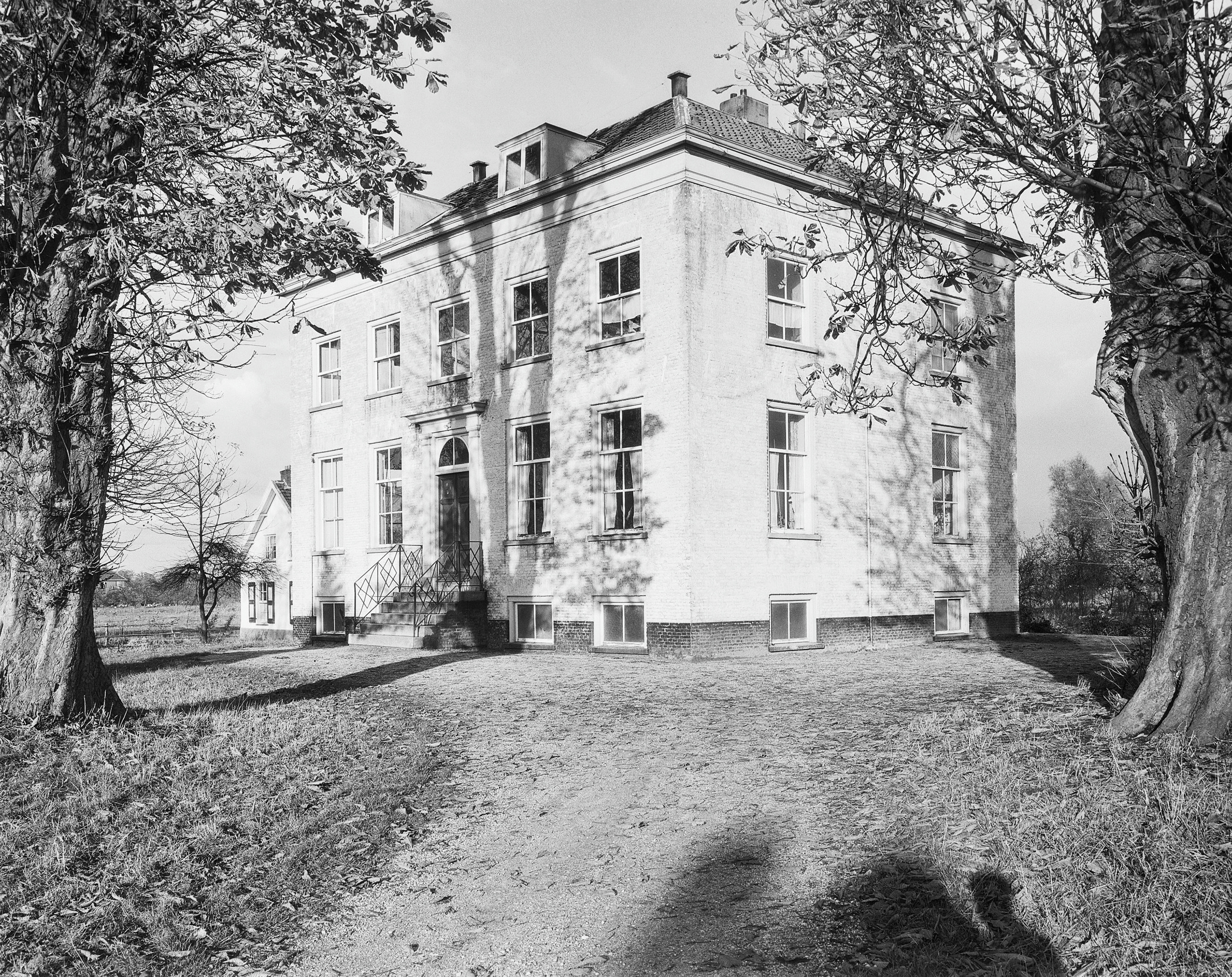
Huis Kellendonk

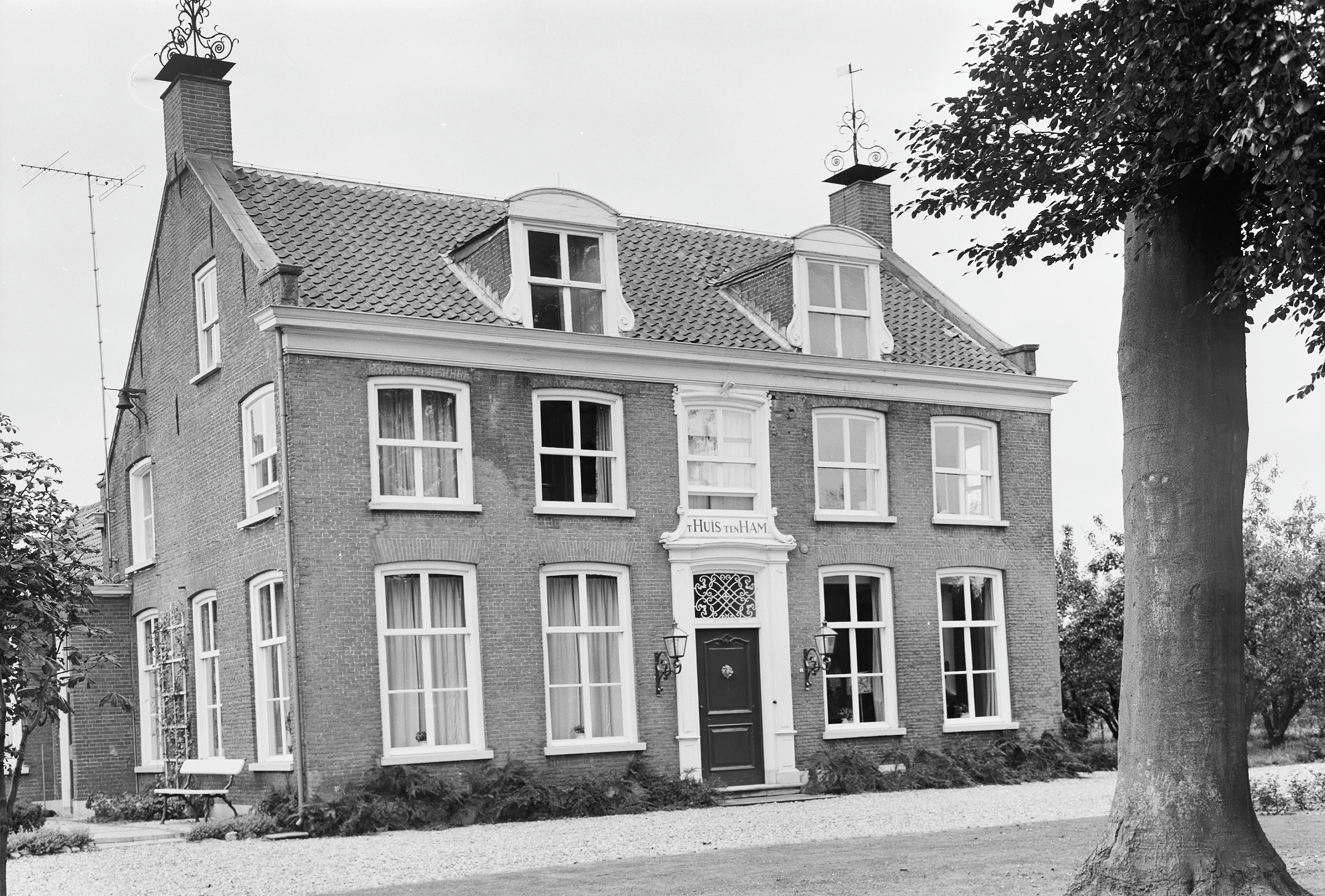
Huis ten Ham

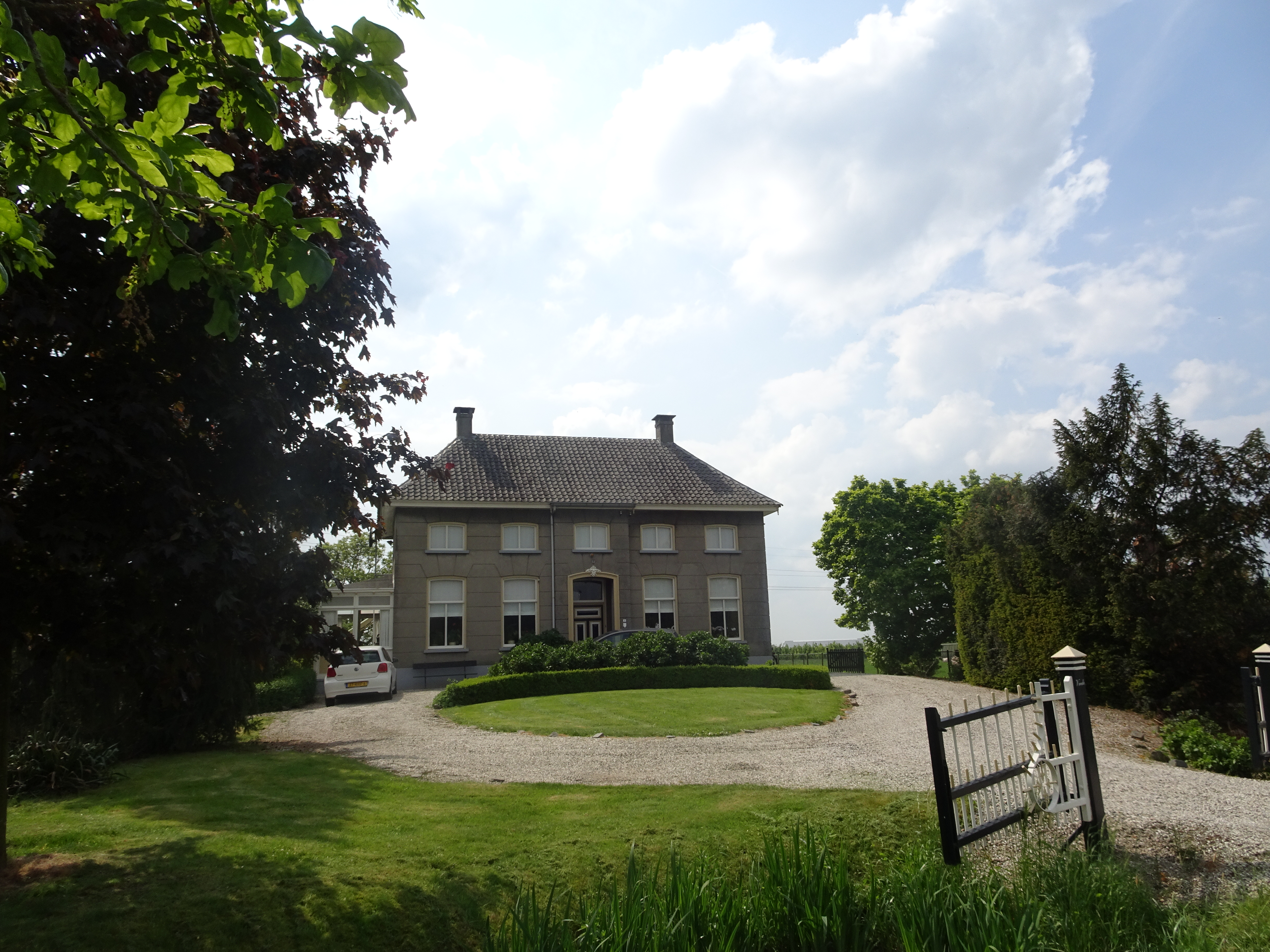
Farm in Kerk-Avezaath
