= Zoelmond =

- Village
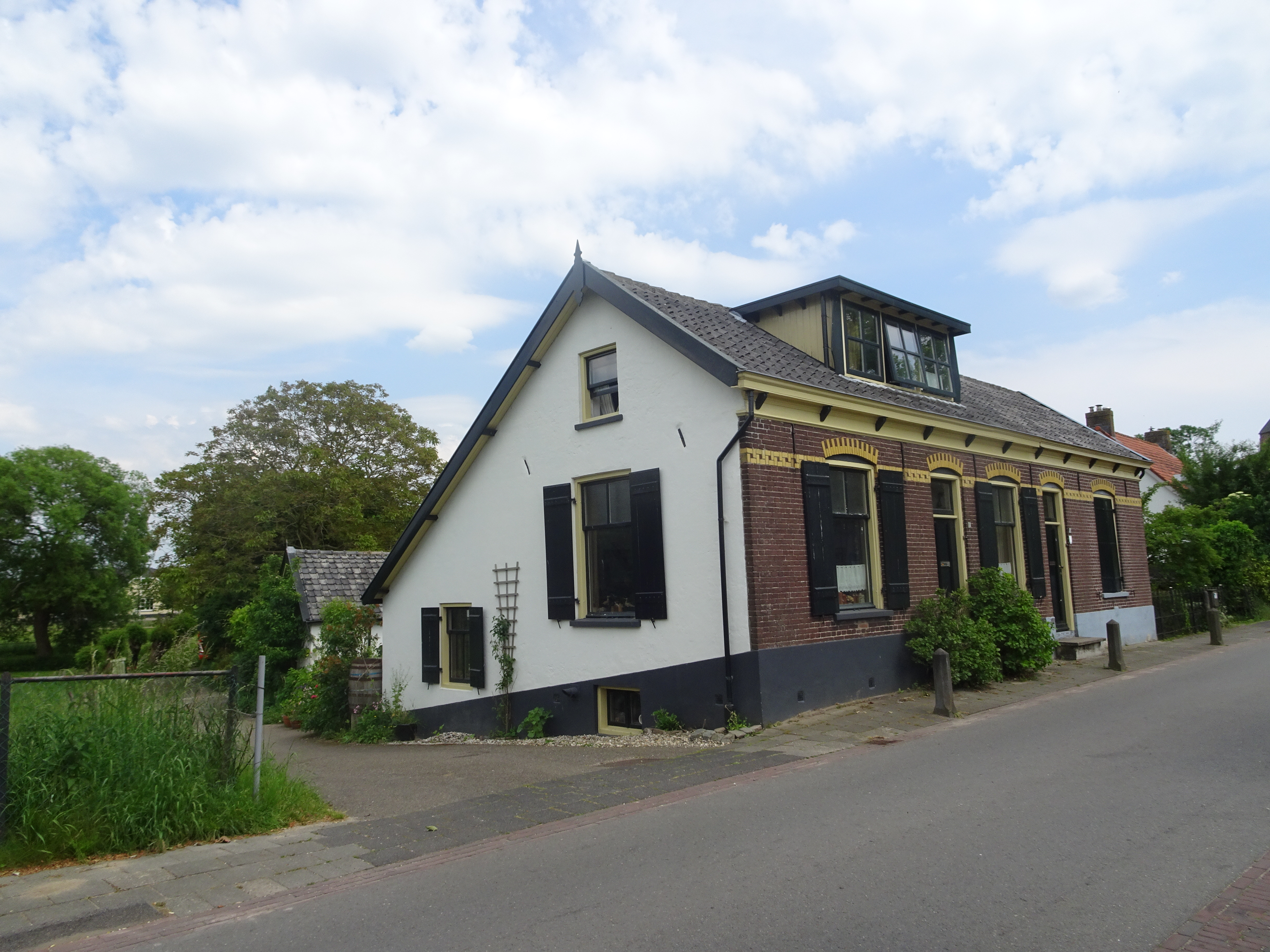
- Dike house in Zoelmond

- Location in the province of Gelderland Zoelmond (Netherlands)
- Coordinates: 51°57′N 5°19′E
- Country: Netherlands
- Province: Gelderland
- Municipality: Buren

Area
  - Total: 11.40 km^{2} (4.40 sq mi)
- Elevation: 4 m (13 ft)

Population (2021)
  - Total: 1,175
  - Density: 103.1/km^{2} (267.0/sq mi)
- Time zone: UTC+1 (CET)
  - Summer (DST): UTC+2 (CEST)
- Postal code: 4111 & 4112
- Dialing code: 0345

Zoelmond is a village in the Dutch province of Gelderland. It is a part of the municipality of Buren, and lies about 10 km northwest of Tiel.

It was first mentioned in 1214 as Zolemunde, and means "mouth of the river Zoel". The village developed into a stretched out esdorp along the former river. A chapel was built in 1404 which was expanded into a church around 1447. The tower dates from 1911. In 1840, it was home to 536 people. A grist mill was built in 1714, but it burned down in 1917 and the remainder was demolished in 1987.

== Gallery ==
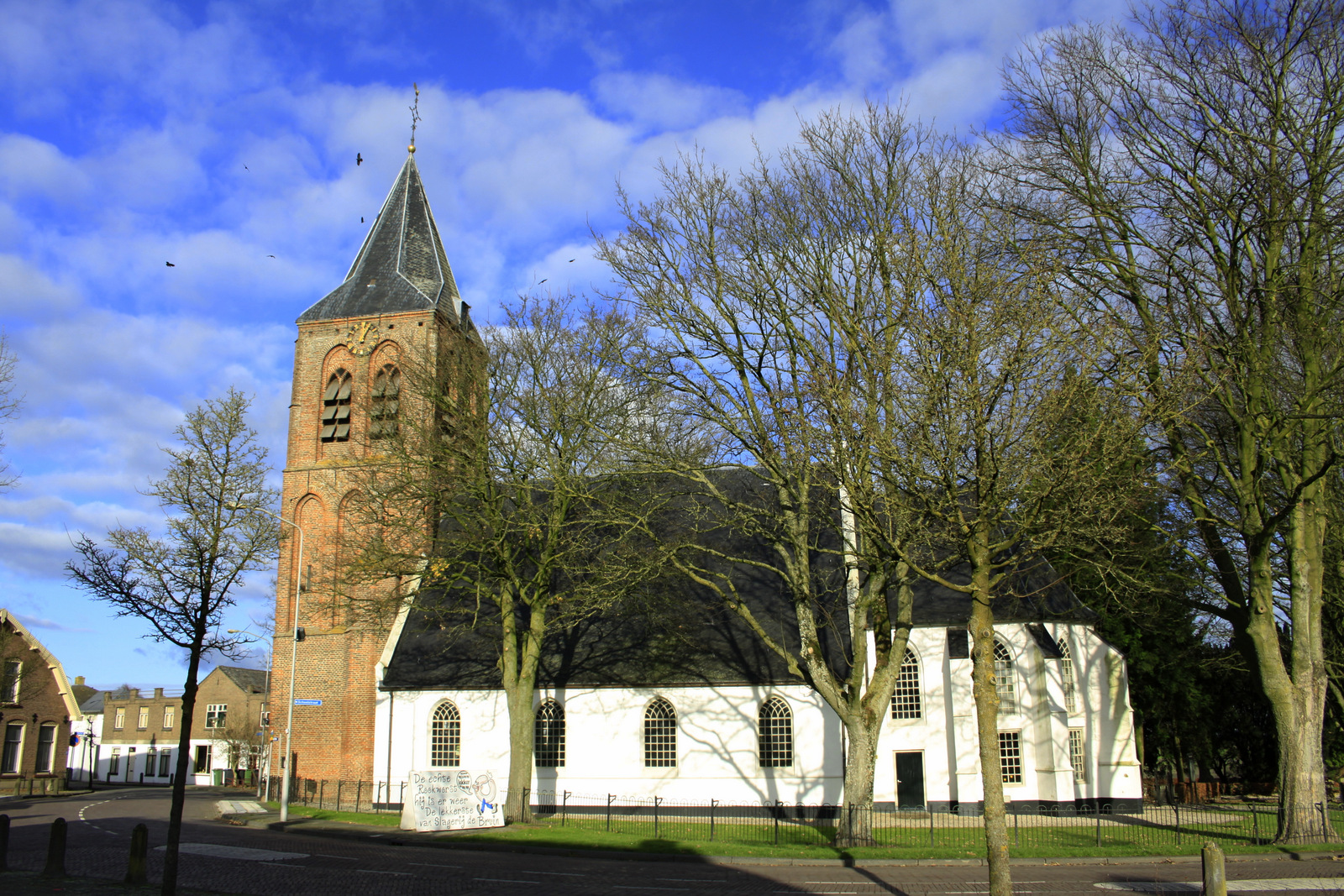
Church of Zoelmond

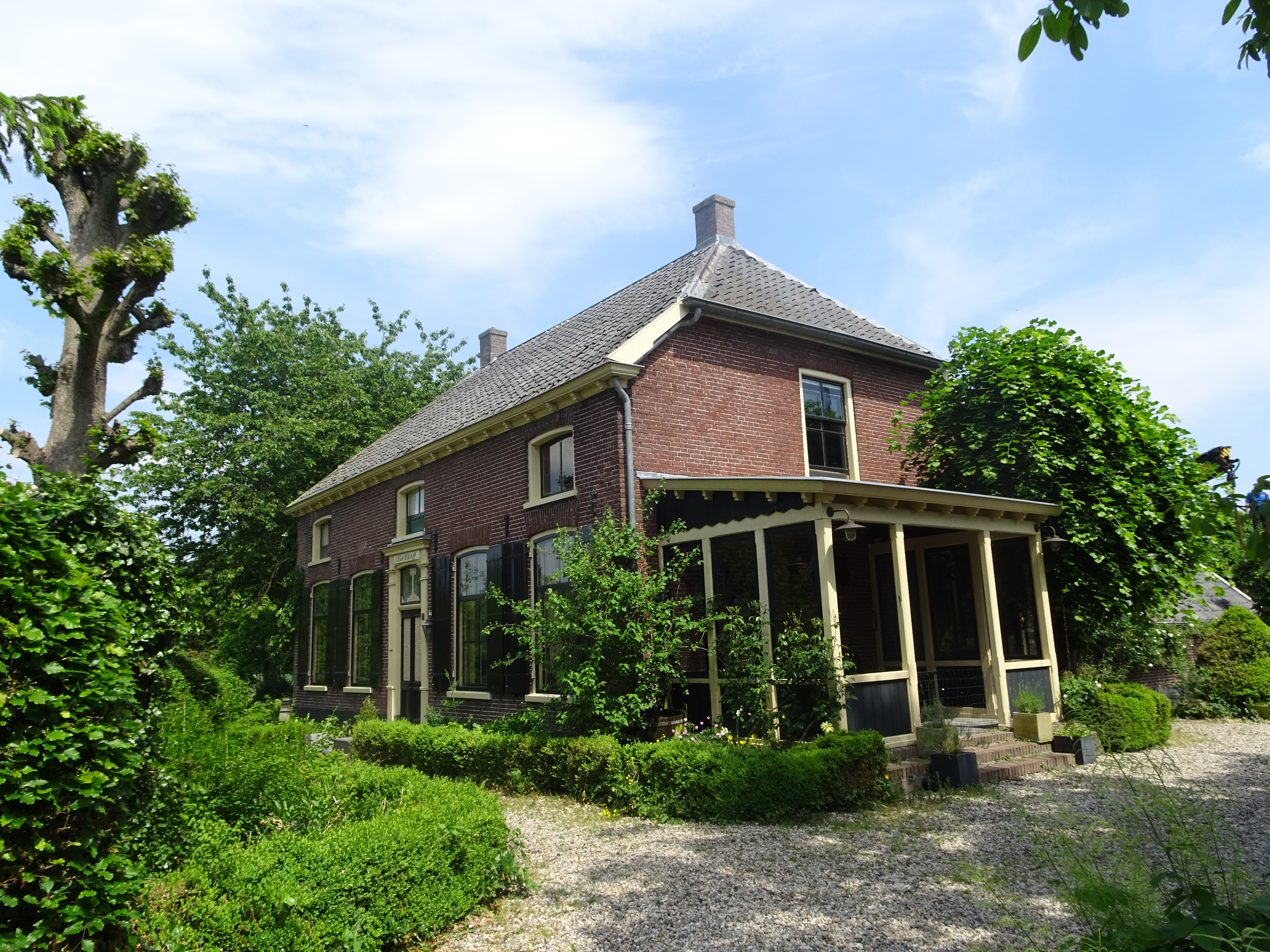
Farm in Zoelmond

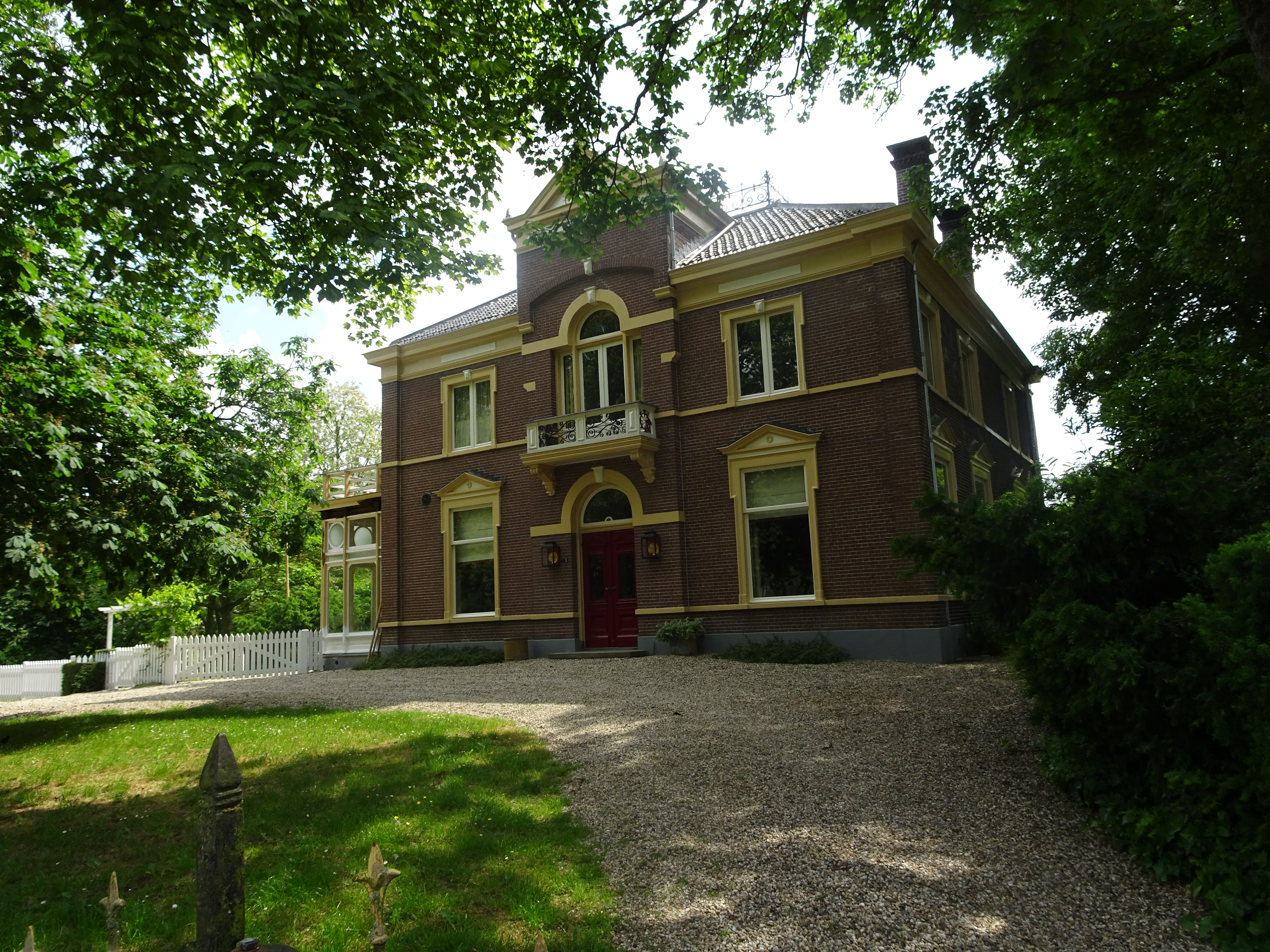
Villa "Het Klooster"

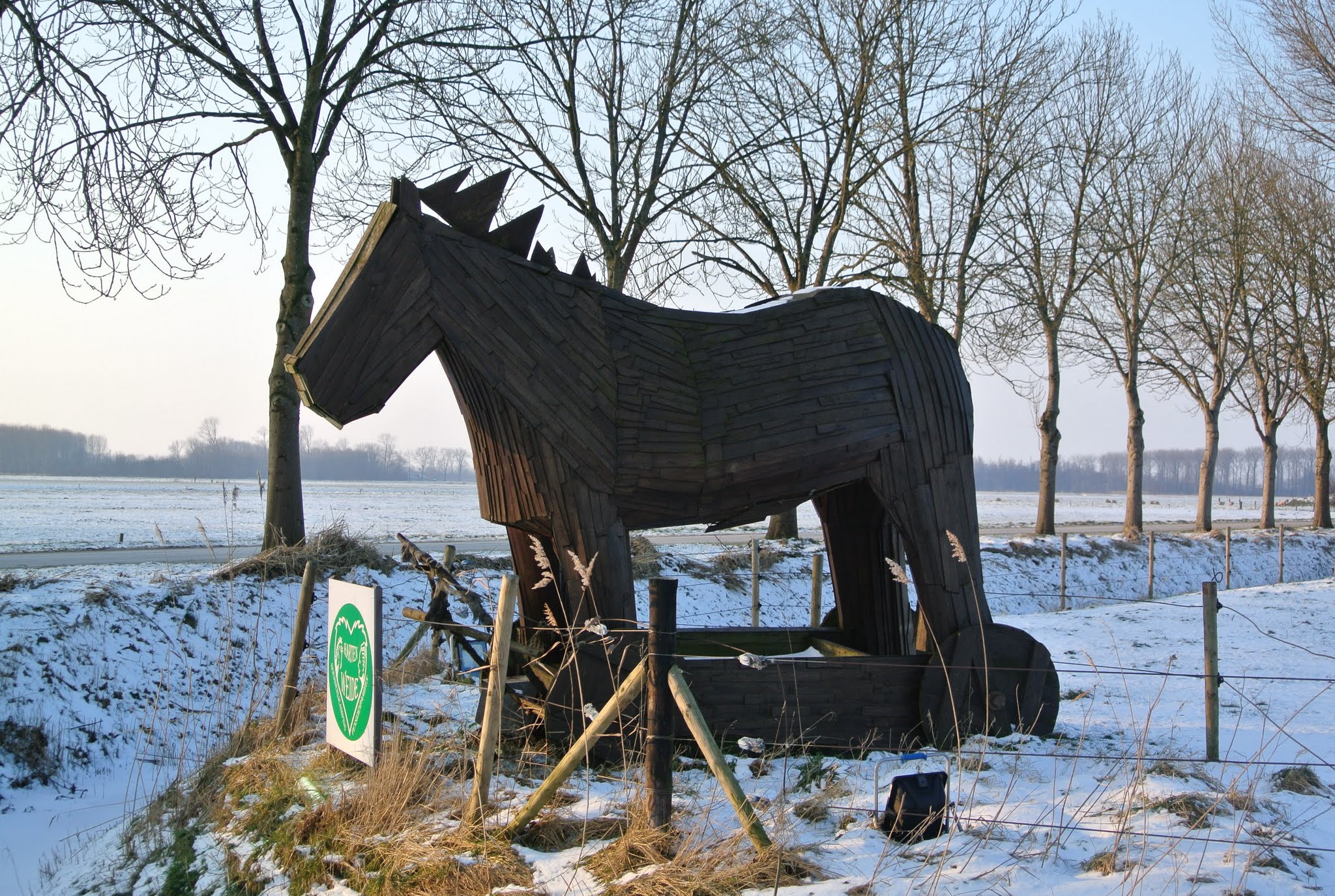
Wooden horse in the pasture
