= Eck en Wiel =

- Village
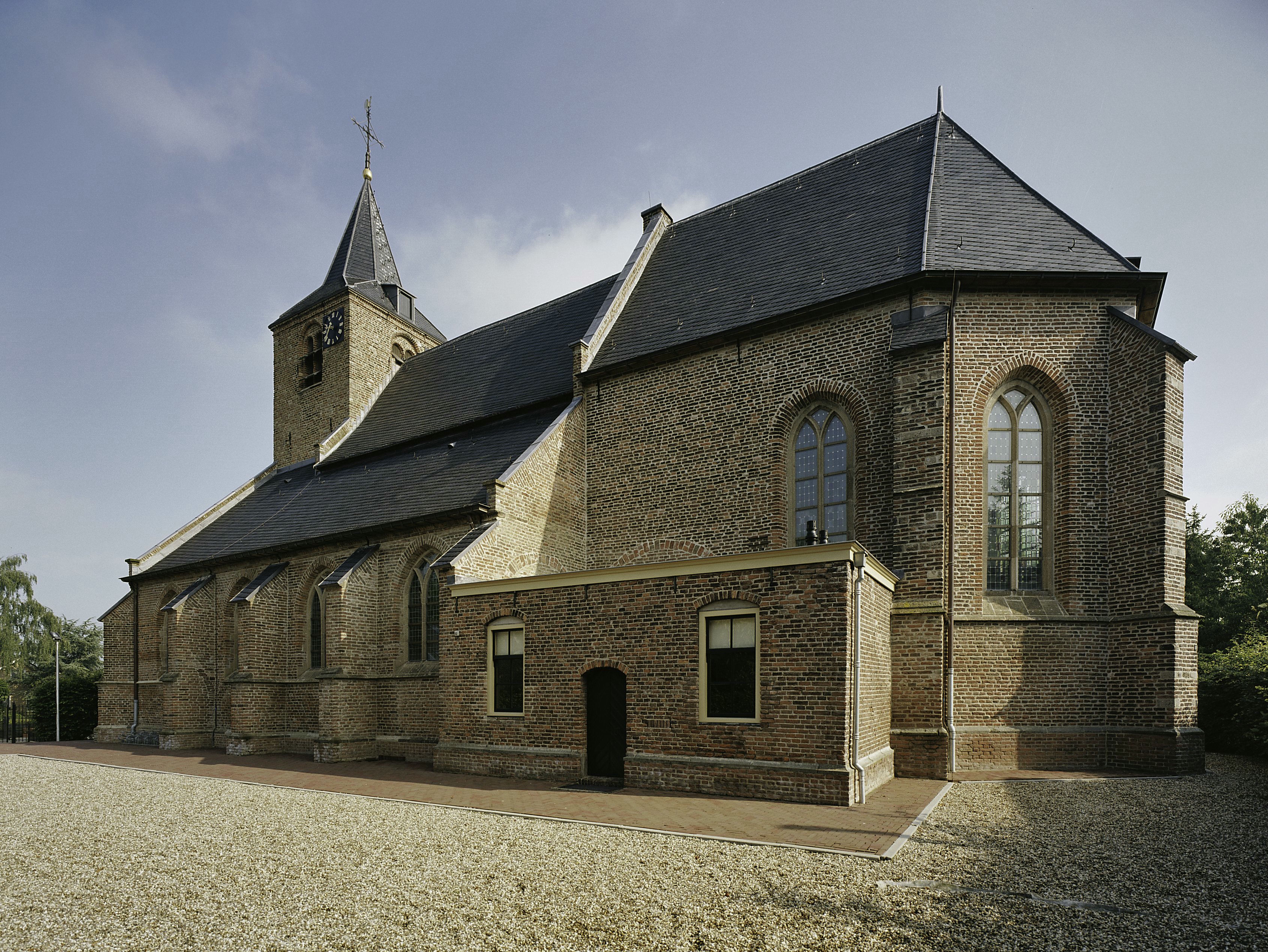
- Church of Eck en Wiel

- Location in the province of Gelderland Eck en Wiel (Netherlands)
- Coordinates: 51.9692°N 5.4567°E
- Country: Netherlands
- Province: Gelderland
- Municipality: Buren

Area
  - Total: 7.06 km^{2} (2.73 sq mi)
- Elevation: 6 m (20 ft)

Population (2021)
  - Total: 1,620
  - Density: 229/km^{2} (594/sq mi)
- Time zone: UTC+1 (CET)
  - Summer (DST): UTC+2 (CEST)
- Postal code: 4024
- Dialing code: 0344

Eck en Wiel is a village in the Dutch province of Gelderland. It is a part of the municipality of Buren, and lies about 9 km southwest of Veenendaal.

== Overview ==
Eck was first mentioned in 953 as Eki. The etymology is unclear. Wiel was first mentioned in 1347 as Wiele, and means "pond created by a dike breach". The settlement originally appeared along the Nederrijn, and developed into a linear settlement along the road.

The first church was built in 1266, but was destroyed around 1363 in a feud between Bronckhorst and the van Heeckeren families. The tower of the current Dutch Reformed Church was constructed in the 14th century and was renewed in 1837. The church itself dates from the early 16th century.

In 1840, Eck was home to 518 people and Wiel to 125 people. During the 19th century, the two villages were referred to as the single entity "Eck en Wiel". The Dutch branch of L'Abri has its residential study centre located in the village.

== Gallery ==
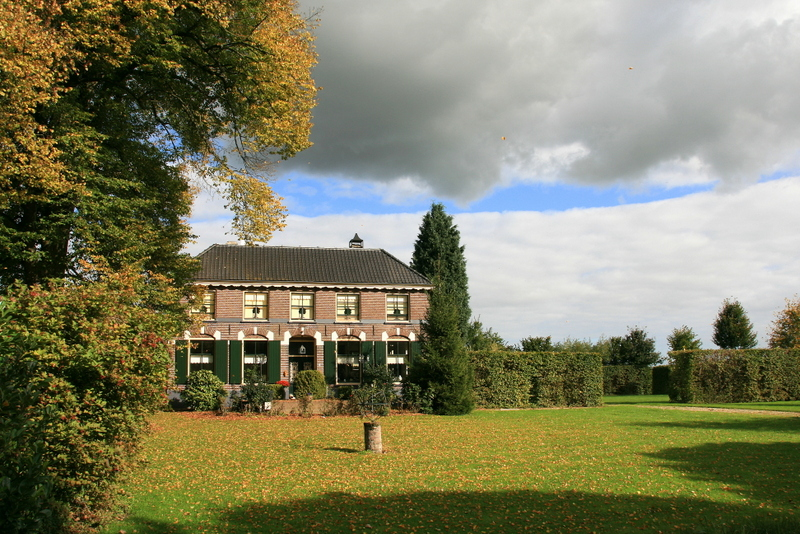
Villa "De Koningsliede"

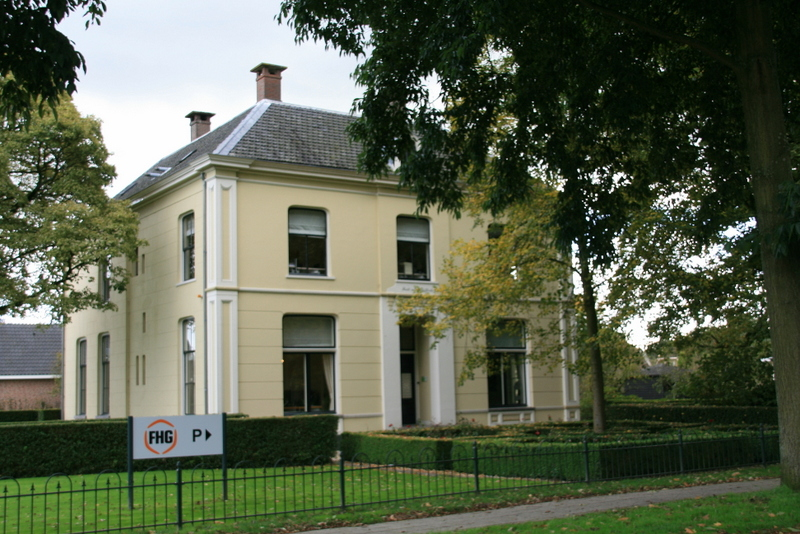
Villa in Eck en Wiel

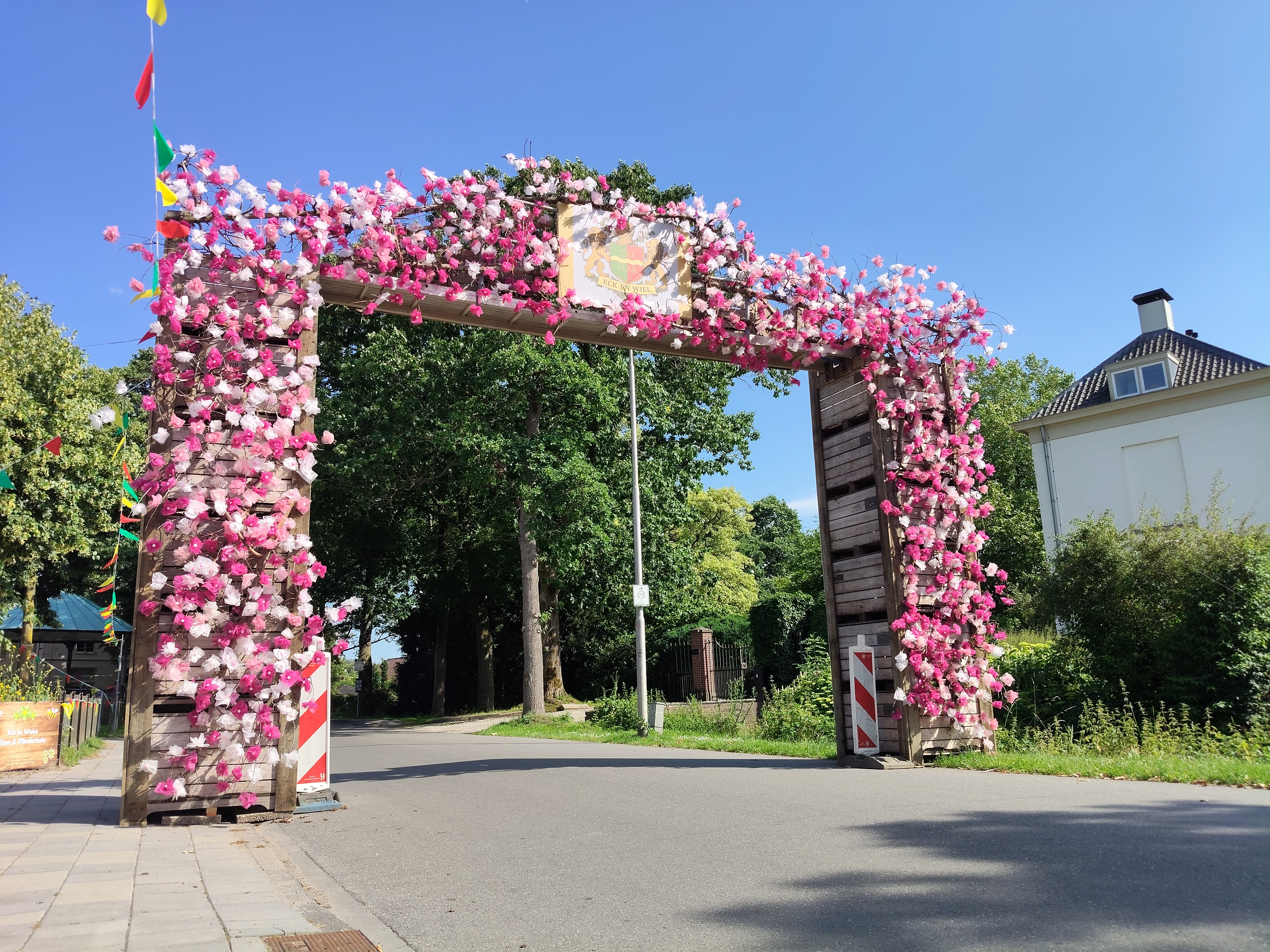
A festive bow that is placed above the entry roads of Eck en Wiel to celebrate it's 750 year anniversary.
