= De Prins Van Oranje, Buren =

Dutch windmill

De Prins van Oranje, Buren
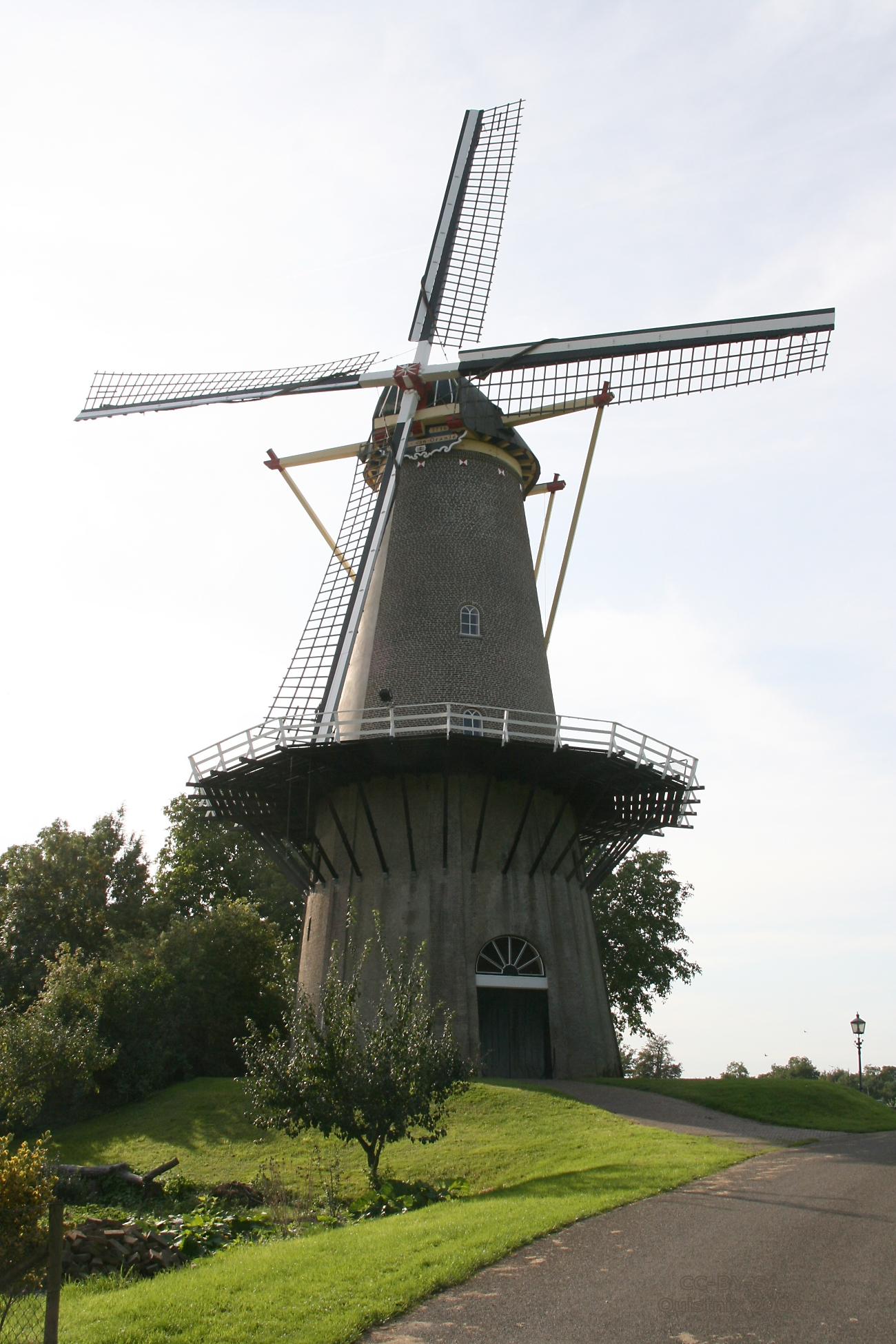
- The mill in September 2008

Origin
- Mill name: De Prins van Oranje
- Mill location: Molenwal 7, 4116, Buren
- Coordinates: 51°54′48″N 5°20′07″E
- Operator(s): Gemeente Buren
- Year built: 1716

Information
- Purpose: Corn mill, formerly also a pearl barley mill
- Type: Tower mill
- Storeys: Five storeys
- No. of sails: Four sails
- Type of sails: Common sails
- Windshaft: Cast iron
- Winding: Tailpole and winch
- No. of pairs of millstones: Two pairs
- Size of millstones: 1.40 metres (4 ft 7 in) diameter

De Prins van Oranje (English: The Prince of Orange) is a tower mill in Buren, Gelderland, Netherlands which was built in 1716 and has been restored to working order. The mill is listed as a Rijksmonument, a national heritage site of the Netherlands, listed by the agency Rijksdienst voor het Cultureel Erfgoed (RCE).

== History ==
There was a windmill on the town wall at Buren in 1575, when it was burnt down. It was a post mill. Another post mill was built in 1577 to replace it. This mill appears on a drawing dated 1646/47 by Roelant Roghman and a painting by Jan Abrahamsz Beerstraaten of a slightly later date. The mill was in poor condition in 1716; it was demolished and replaced by a tower mill. The mill gets its name De Prins van Oranje from being owned from 1716-95 by the Count of Buren, a title now held by the Dutch Monarch. The tower mill was a corn mill and pearl barley mill.

In 1911, the mill caught fire. It was restored using machinery from De Reus (English: The Giant), Rotterdam, South Holland. This was an oil mill which had been demolished in 1910. The mill was raised several metres when it was rebuilt after the fire. In 1913, it was fitted with Patent sails. The mill's business, making flour for local bakeries, disappeared after 1918 and the internal machinery was removed. In 1947, the Patent sails were removed. Also in that year, the mill was purchased by the Gemeente Buren. It was restored externally in 1952 and was maintained as a landmark for over 20 years. In 1974, the mill was fully restored, with new internal machinery. De Prins van Oranje is listed as a Rijksmonument, № 11333.

== Description ==
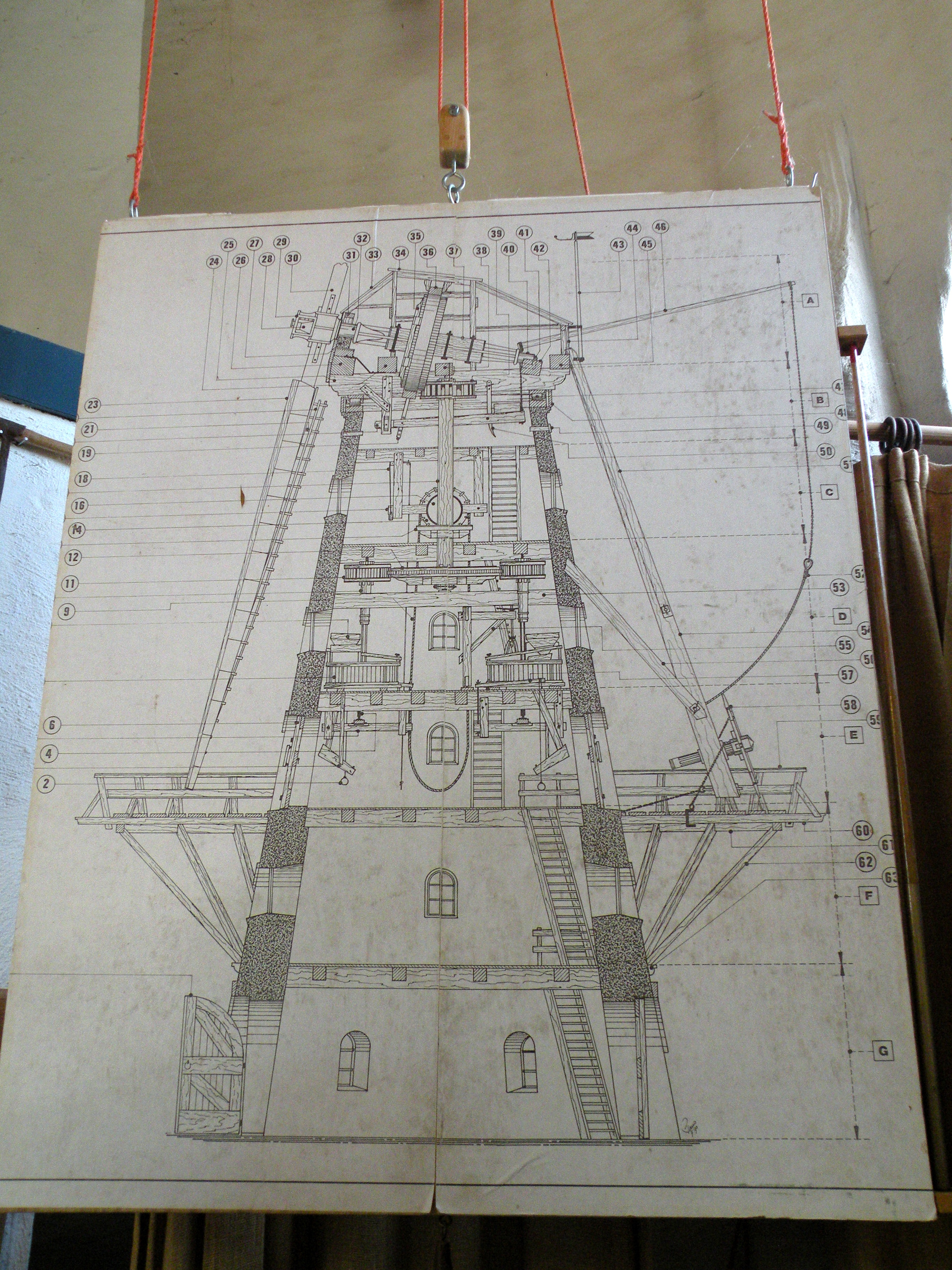
Cross-section of the mill and machinery.

De Prins van Oranje is what the Dutch call a "Walmolen". It is a five-storey tower mill with a stage, which is 8.60 metres (28 ft 3 in) above ground level. The cap is covered in dakleer. Winding is by tailpole and winch. The sails are Common sails. They have a span of 27.00 metres (88 ft 7 in). They are carried on a cast iron windshaft, which was cast by Nolet c.1840. The windshaft also carries the brake wheel, which has 58 cogs. This drives a wallower with 27 teeth, which is situated at the top of the upright shaft. At the bottom of the upright shaft is the great spur wheel, which has 87 cogs. This drives two pairs of 1.40 metres (4 ft 7 in) Cullen millstones via lantern pinion stone nuts with 26 staves each. The stones are overdrift millstones.

== Public access ==
De Prins van Oranje is open on Tuesday, Thursday and Saturday from 10:00 to 16:00.
