= Buren =

- Municipality
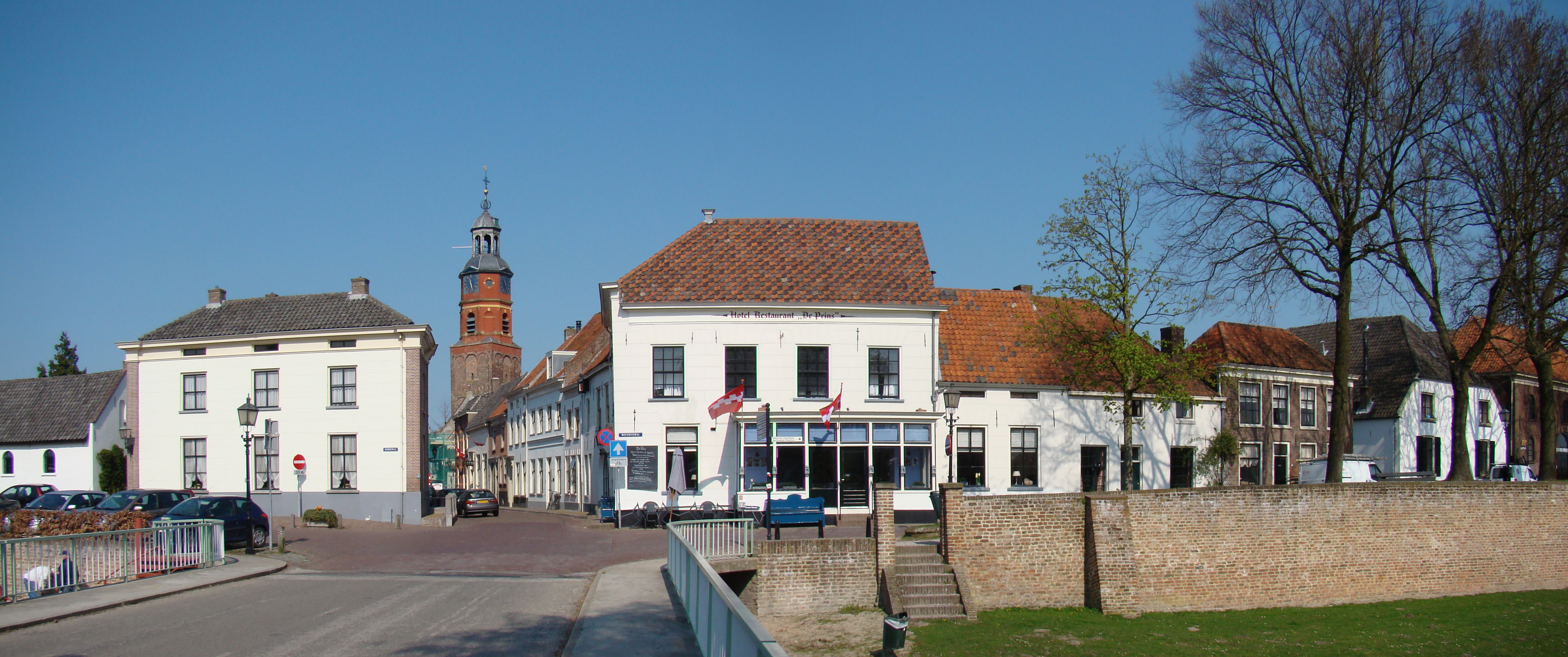
- Buren

- Flag Coat of arms

- Location in Gelderland
- Coordinates: 51°54′38″N 5°20′02″E
- Country: Netherlands
- Province: Gelderland

Government
  - Body: Municipal council
  - Mayor: H.M. Ostendorp (CDA)

Area
  - Total: 142.92 km^{2} (55.18 sq mi)
  - Land: 133.89 km^{2} (51.70 sq mi)
  - Water: 9.03 km^{2} (3.49 sq mi)
- Elevation: 5 m (16 ft)

Population (January 2021)
  - Total: 27,009
  - Density: 202/km^{2} (520/sq mi)
- Time zone: UTC+1 (CET)
  - Summer (DST): UTC+2 (CEST)
- Postcode: Parts of 4000 and 4100 ranges
- Area code: 0344, 0345
- Website: www.buren.nl

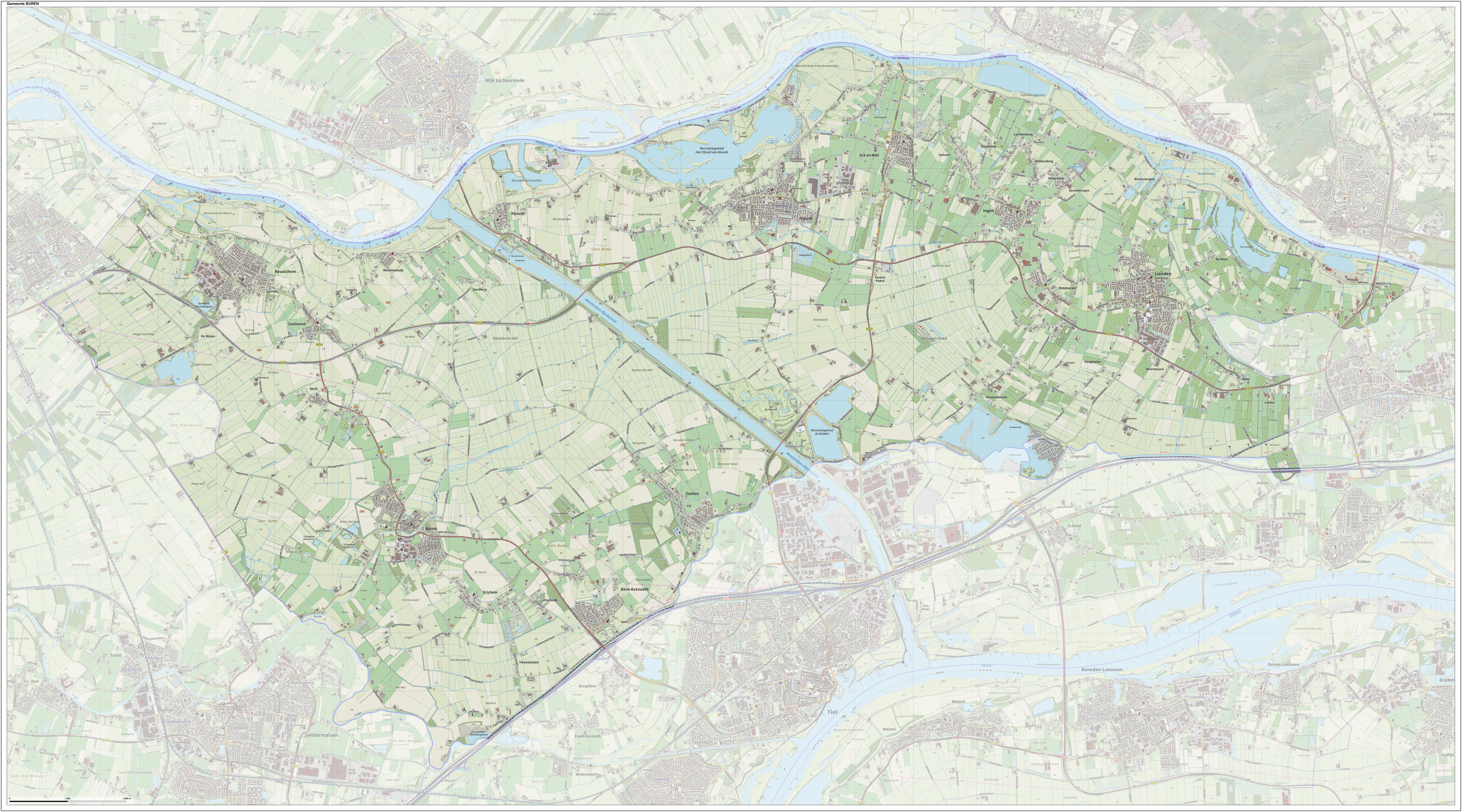
Map of Buren, June 2015

Buren (Dutch pronunciation: [ˈbyːrə(n)]) is a town and municipality in the Betuwe region of the Netherlands. Buren has 27,168 inhabitants as of 1 January 2022.

== Geography ==
Buren is located in Gelderland, a province of the Netherlands. It is part of the landscape of Betuwe, a very fertile strip of land between two branches of Rhine-Meuse Delta, the Nederrijn in the north and the Waal in the south.

=== Population centers ===
Population centers include:

- Aalst
- Asch
- Beusichem
- Buren
- Eck en Wiel
- Erichem
- Ingen
- Kerk-Avezaath
- Lienden
- Ommeren
- Ravenswaaij
- Rijswijk
- Zoelen
- Zoelmond

== History ==
The earliest known settlement of the region occurred as early as 772. Castle Buren was built by the Lords of Buren and was first mentioned in 1298. The town was granted city rights in 1395 by Sir Alard IV of Buren which led to the construction of a defensive wall and a moat, significant portions of which still stand. In 1492, the region was promoted to a county (i.e. a territory ruled by a count), but had limited economic influence due to its geographic isolation. By 1574, the previously Catholic parish church of Saint-Lambert (Dutch: Sint Lambertus) had become Calvinist Reformed Protestant.

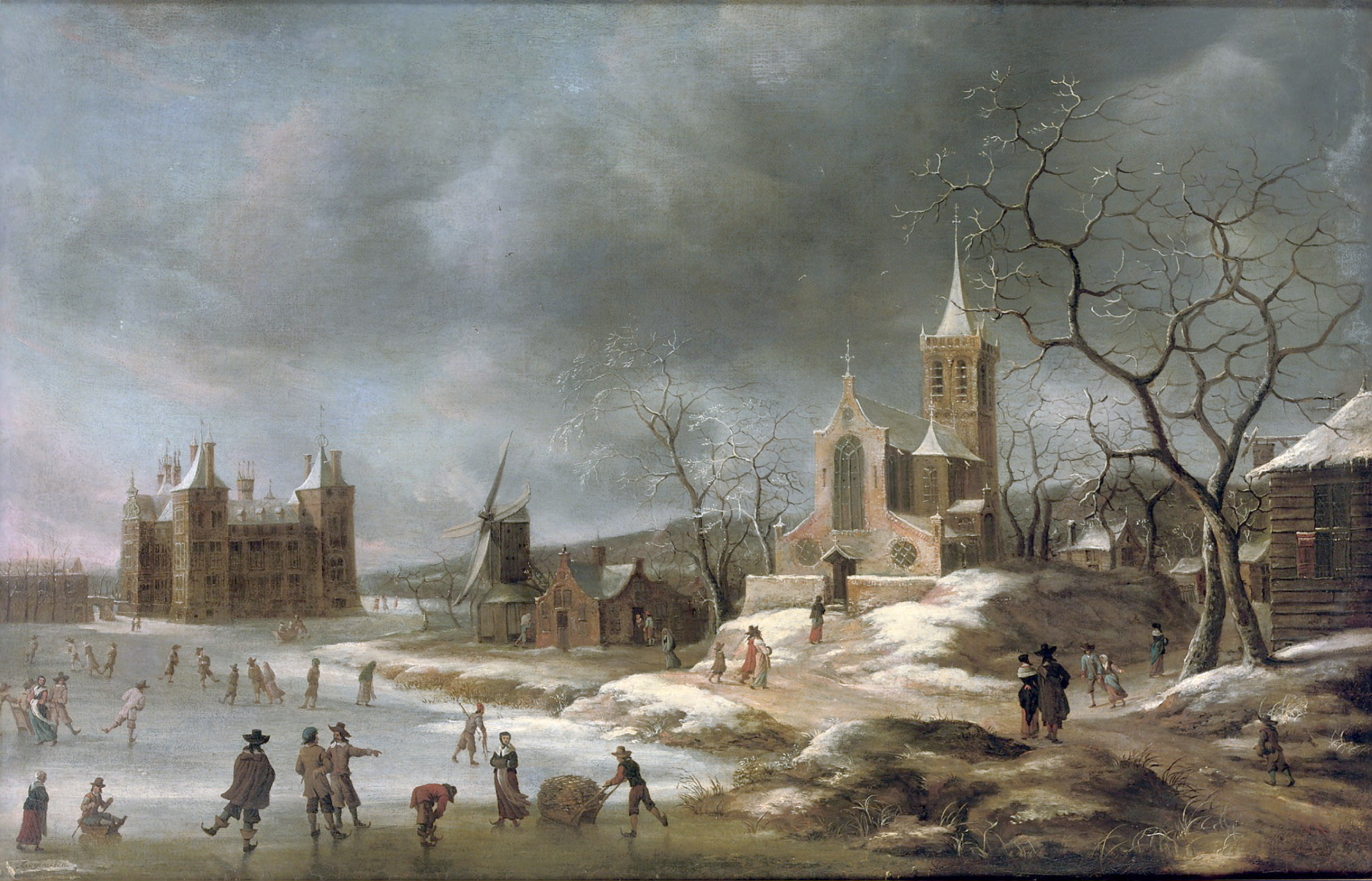
A winter landscape with activities on the ice near Castle Buren. Jan Abrahamsz Beerstraaten, between 1622 and 1666

The Castle eventually came into the possession of the House of Orange, the royal family of the Netherlands. The Dutch royal family has been known to use the name van Buren as an alias to give themselves some degree of anonymity. William III of England obtained the title Buren. The Dutch royal family still use this as a title. The Castle was gradually demolished between 1804 and 1883. The eighth president of the United States, Martin Van Buren, traced his ancestry to inhabitants of the town, who had taken the surname Van Buren after relocating to the Dutch colony of New Netherlands in what is now the state of New York. In 1853, following the end of his presidency, Van Buren made a visit to the town while on a tour of Europe and reportedly met with several distant relatives.

The current municipality is the result of 2 mergers. On 1 January 1978, the municipalities of Beusichem, Zoelen and part of Buurmalsen were added to the existing municipality of Buren, that was formed in the mid-19th century. On 1 January 1999, Buren was enlarged with the addition of the municipalities of Lienden and Maurik.

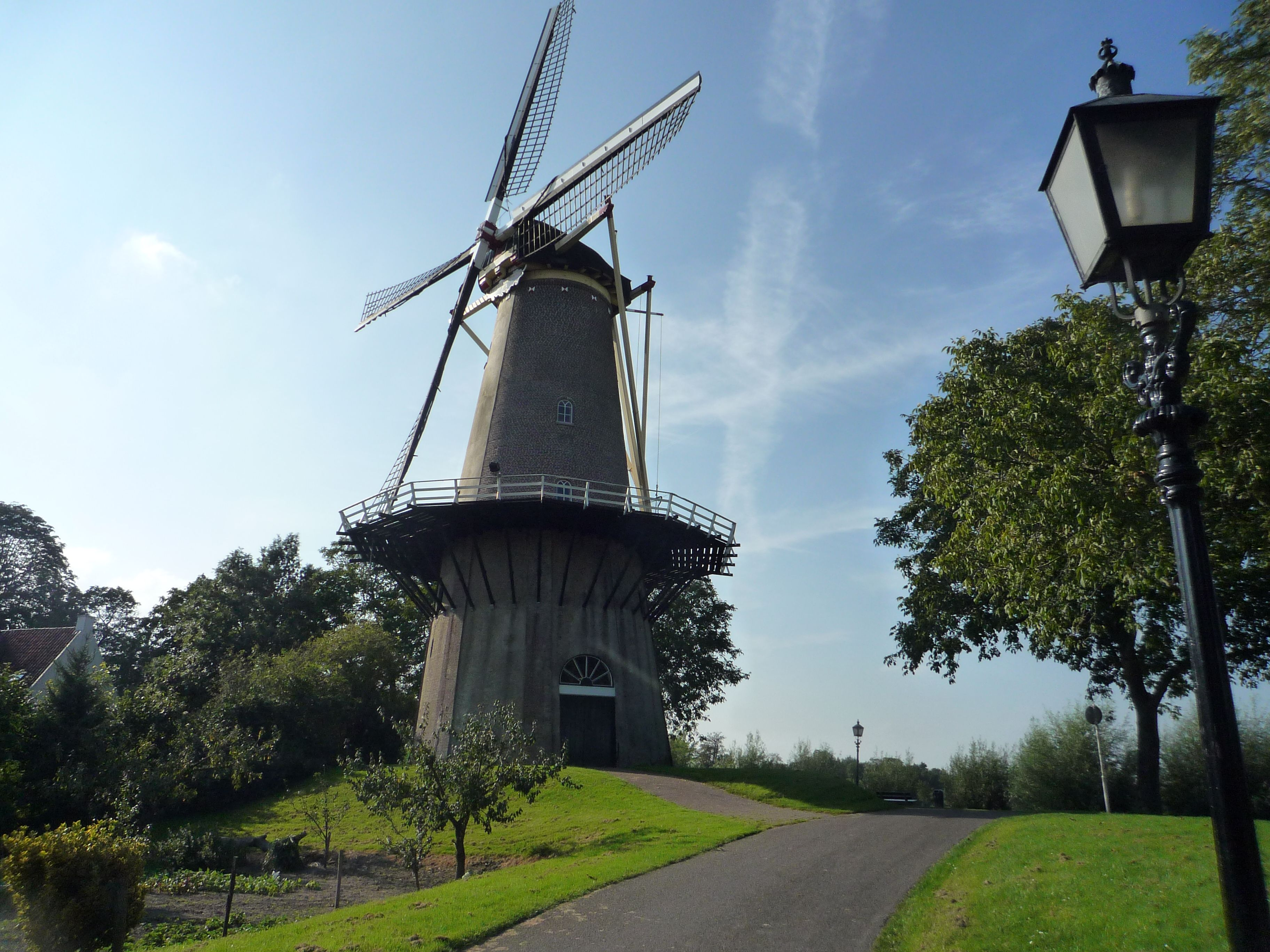
De Prins Van Oranje windmill

== Historical sites ==
Buren has two museums:

- The Museum of the Royal Military Police, located in a 17th-century orphanage.
- The Museum of the Dutch Royal Family, located in the historic city hall.

It is also home to De Prins Van Oranje, a restored windmill.

== Government and politics ==
The title "Count or Countess of Buren and Leerdam" is held by the Dutch monarchy due to Prince William of Orange's marriage to the Countess of Buren, Anna of Egmont, in 1551. As a result, the county and the town of Buren fall under the control of the Royal House of Orange-Nassau.

== Demographics ==
- Dutch: 92.9%
- European: 4.7%
- African: 0.7%
- Arabian: 0.5%
- Other: 1.2%

== Twin town ==
Buren is twinned with:

- Kinderhook, New York, United States

== Notable people ==
- Philip William, Prince of Orange (1554 in Buren – 1618) Prince of Orange in 1584 and Knight of the Golden Fleece in 1599
- Gerard de Kruijff (1890 in Buren – 1968) a horse rider who competed in the 1924 and the 1928 Summer Olympics
- Lukas Smits (born 1935 in Ravenswaaij) a painter.
- Jos Beijnen (born 1956 in Beusichem) a pharmacist and academic
- Ron Stevens (born 1959 in Lienden) a sprint canoer who competed in two Summer Olympics

== Gallery ==
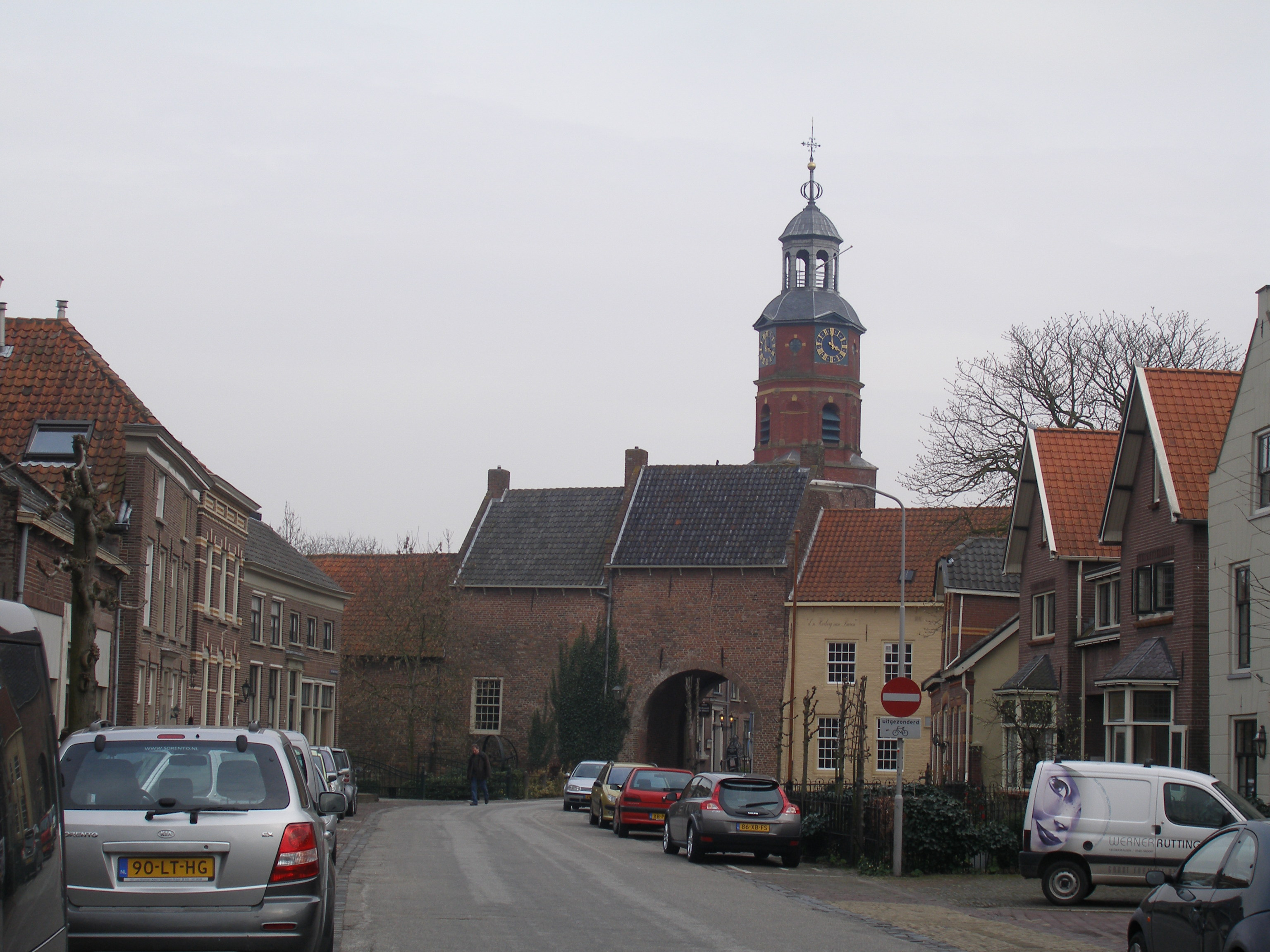
Culemborg gate with Saint-Lambertus church, Buren in background.

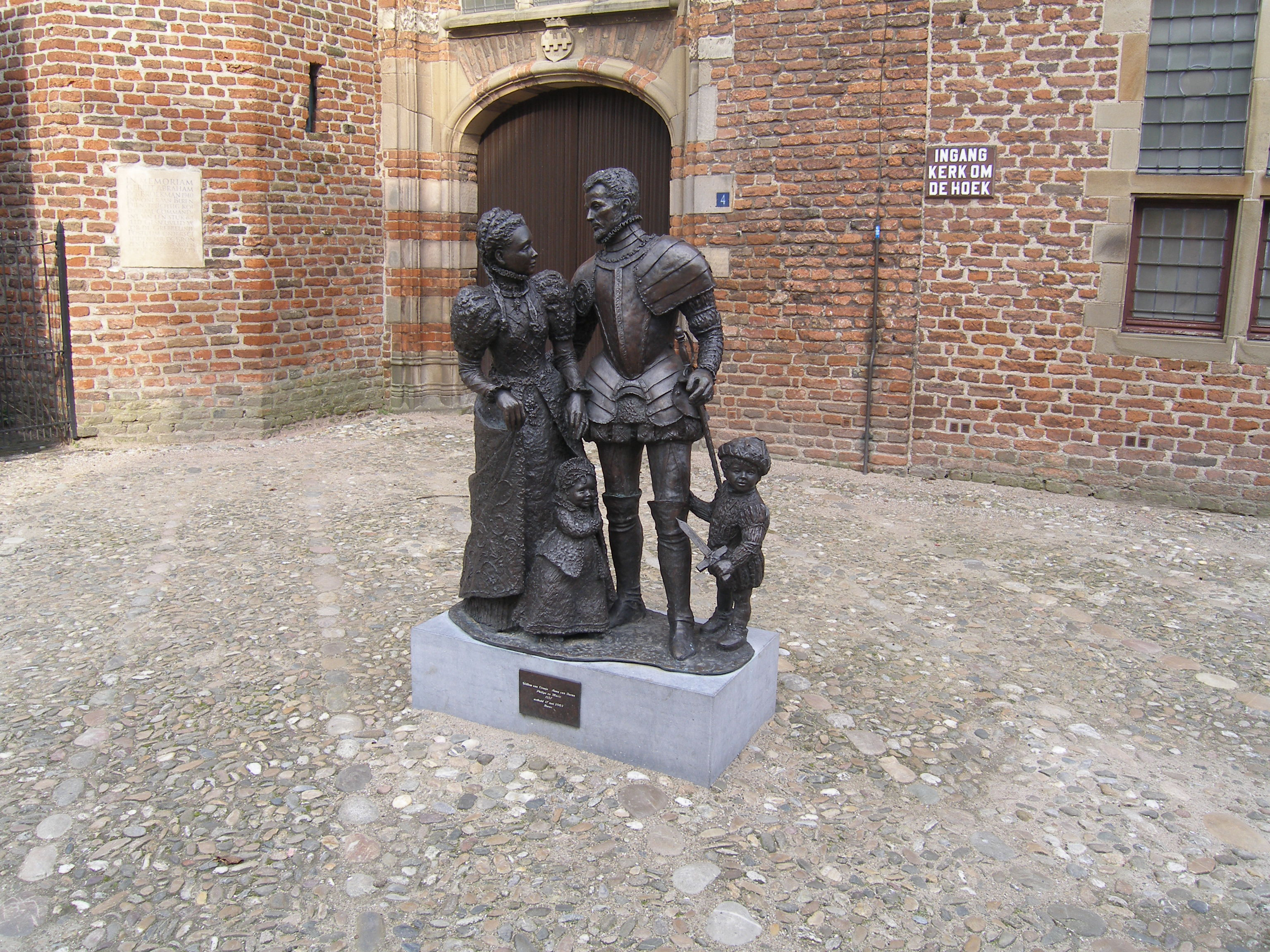
Statue in the center of Buren - William of Orange and Anna van Buren

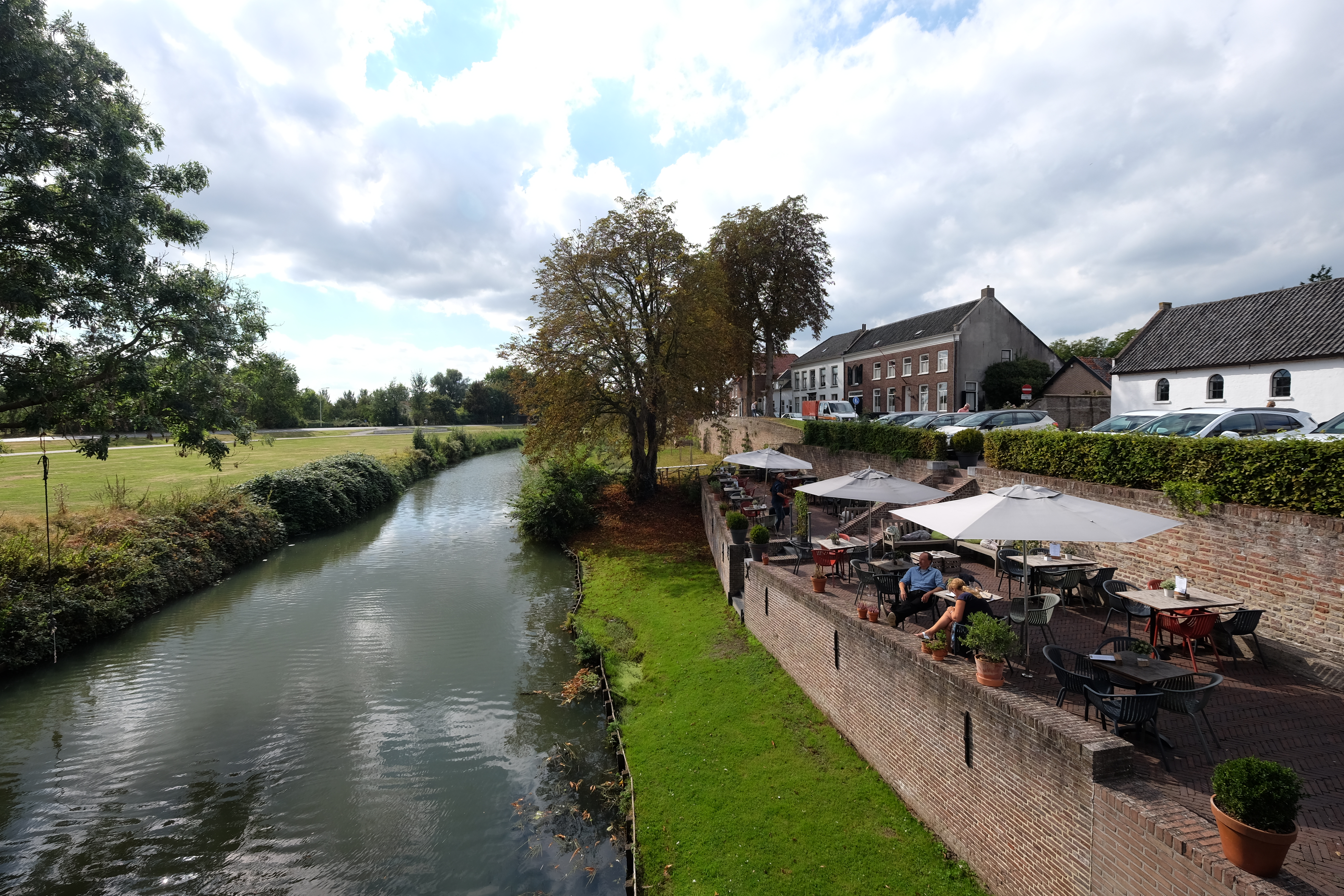
Buren, panoramio

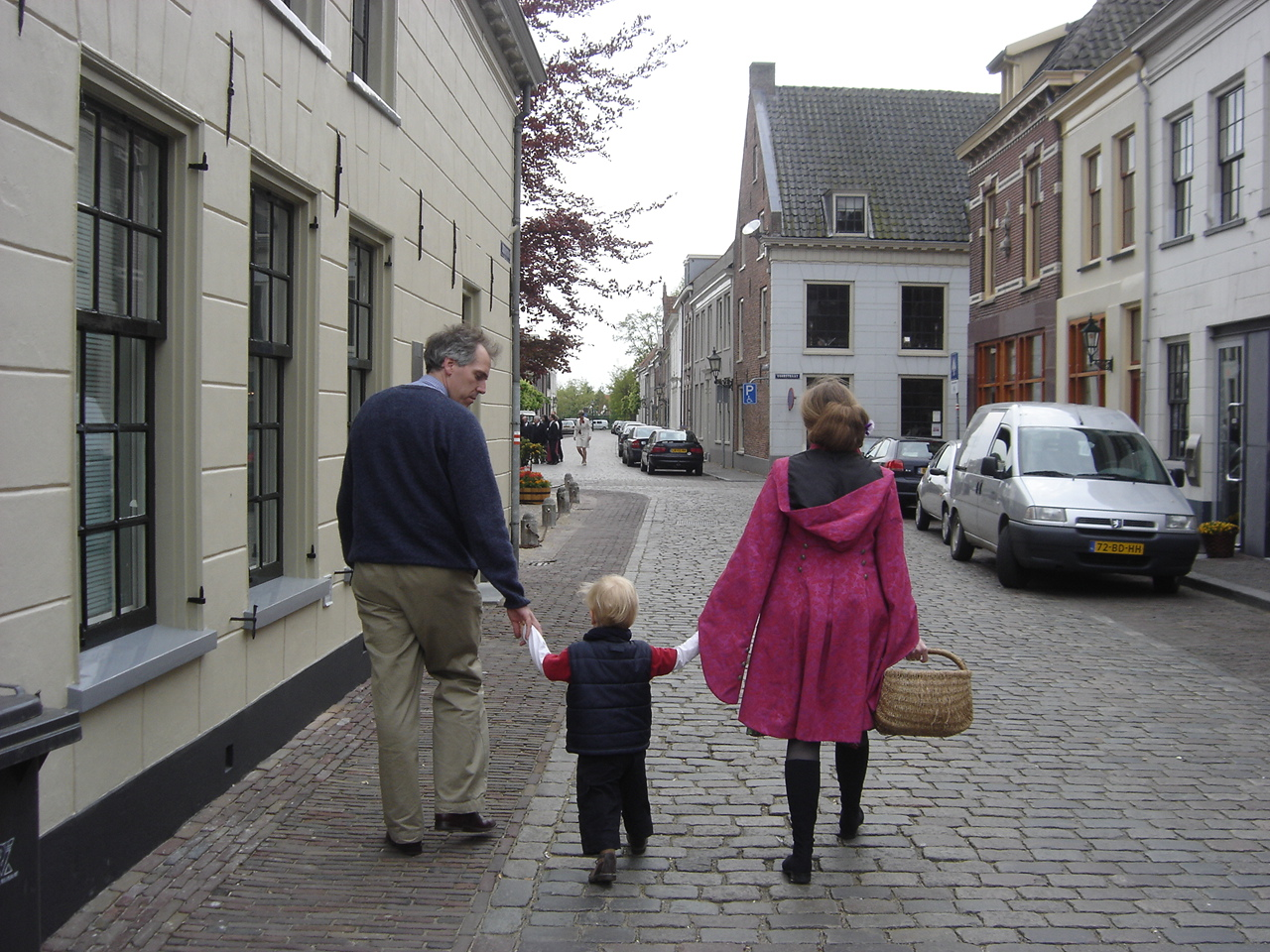
Buren, Herenstraat and the Rodeheldenstraat in background.

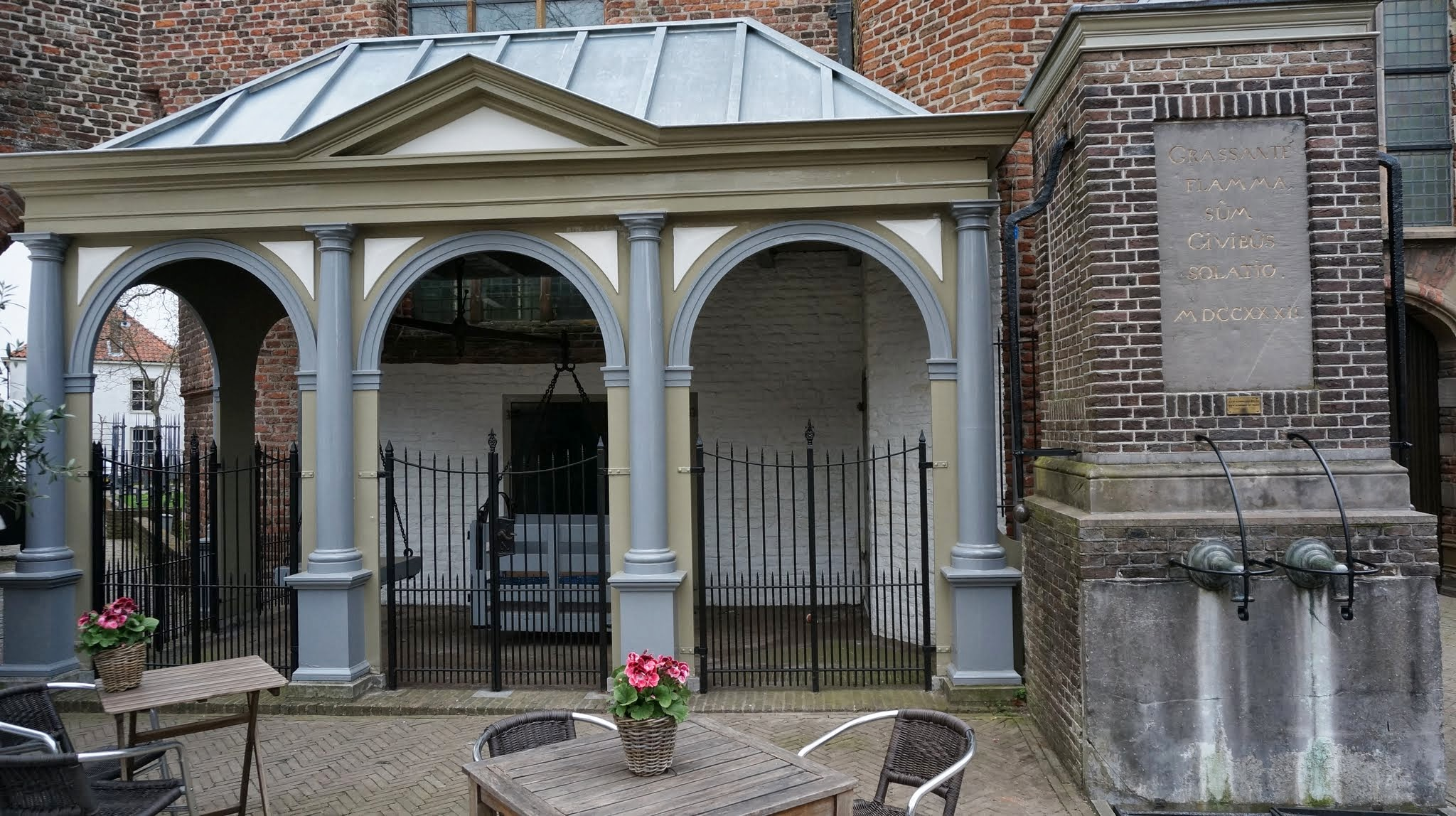
Weighing scales and village pump on the market square in Buren.

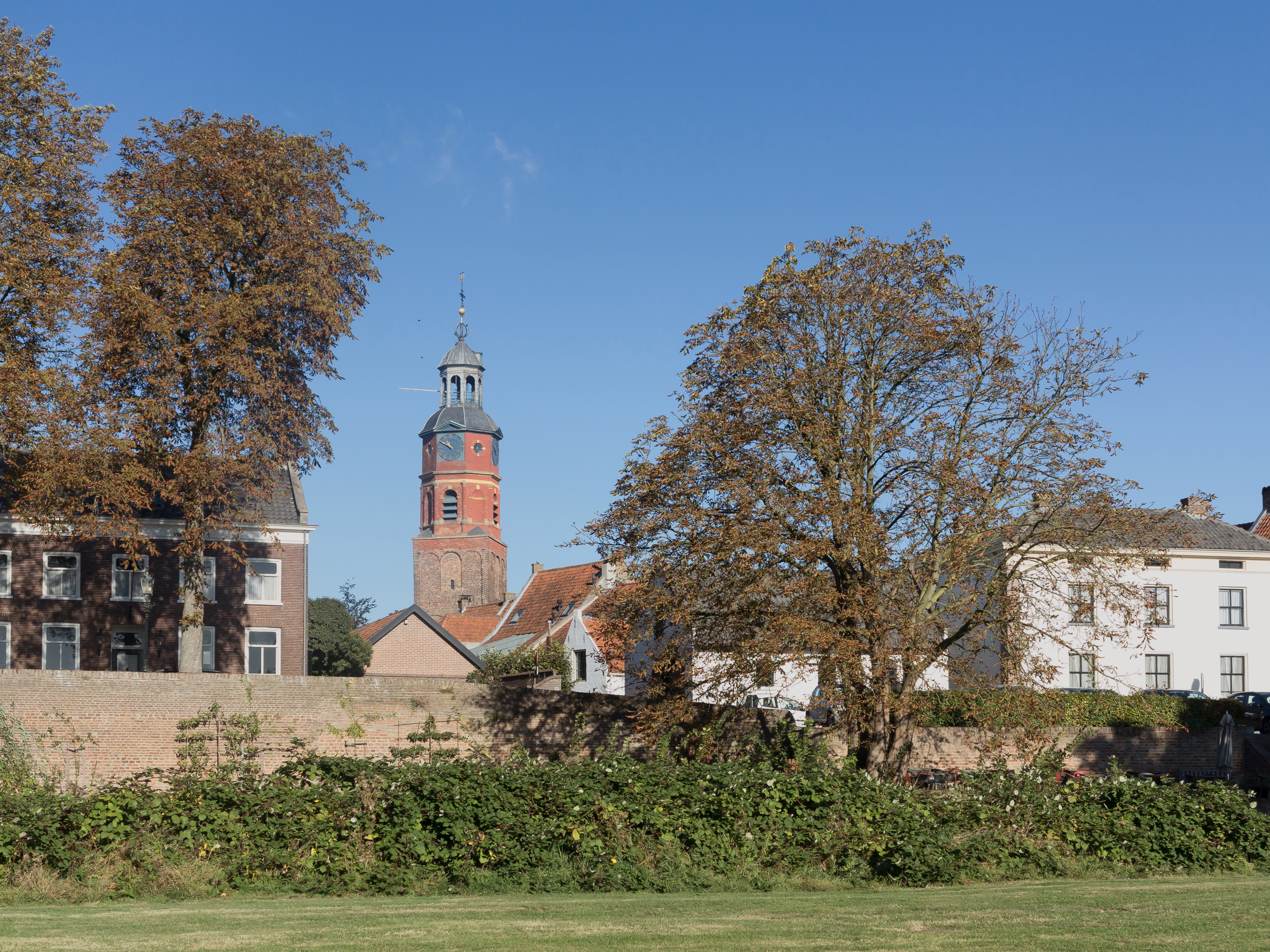
Buren, church, de Sint-Lambertuskerk behind wall

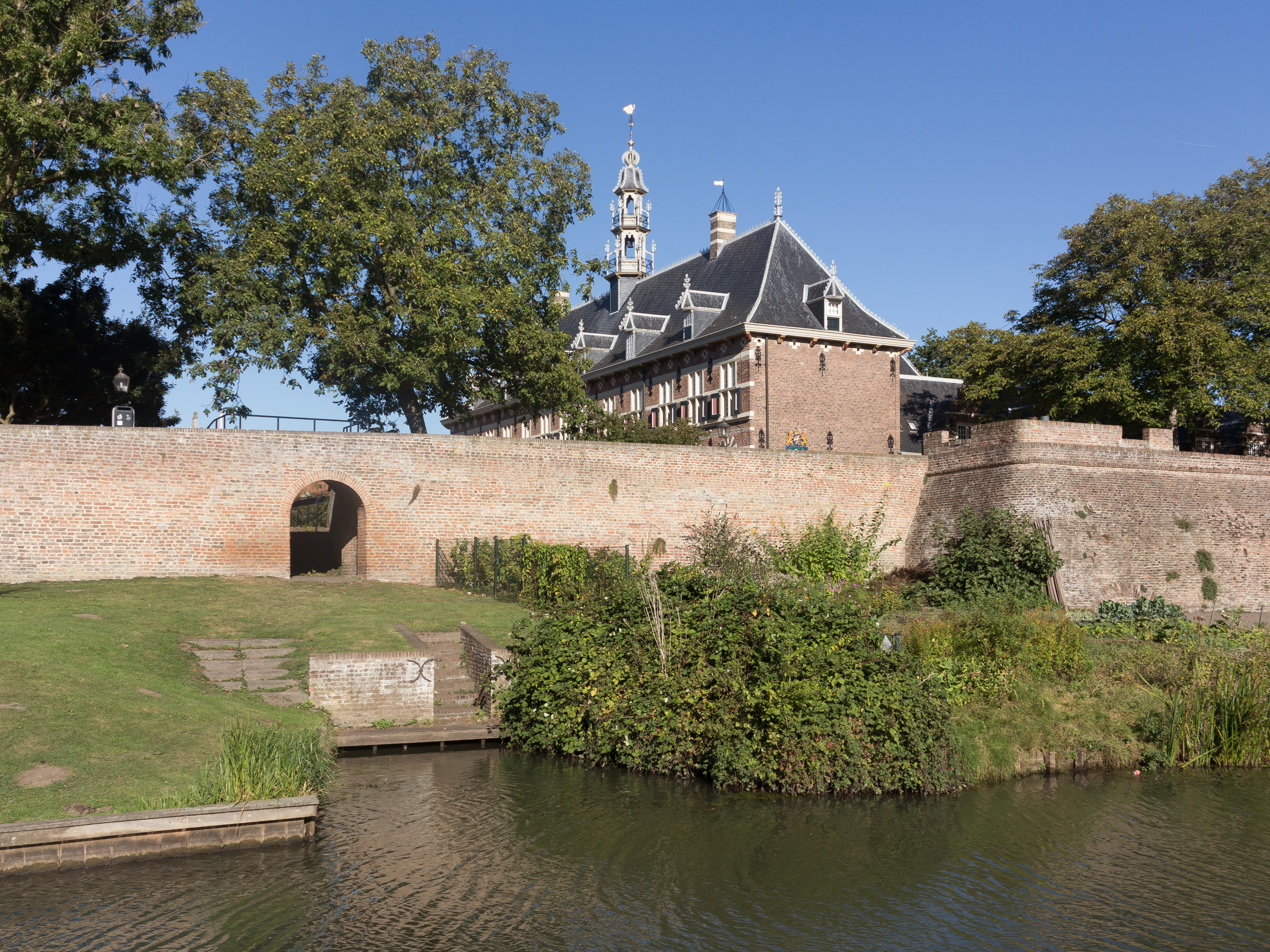
Buren, orphan house behind wall
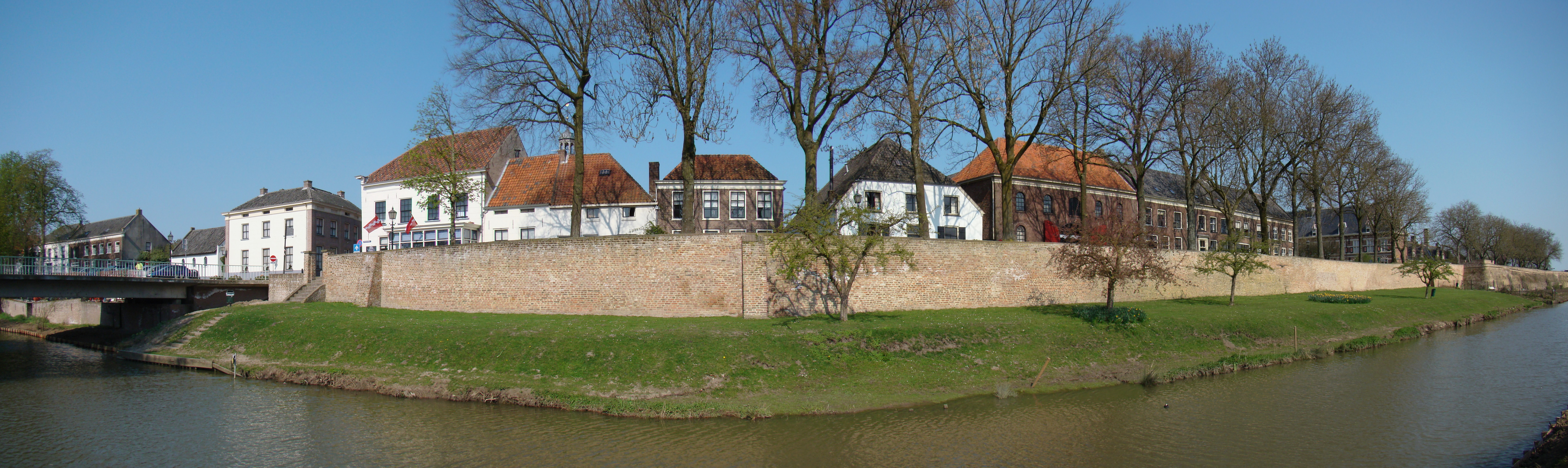
Buren, Citywall

== See also ==
- Van Buren (surname)
- House of Egmond
