= Van Assche =

Van Assche is a Dutch surname meaning "from Asse". Notable people with the surname include:

- Henri Van Assche (1774–1841), Belgian painter
- Kris Van Assche (born 1976), Belgian fashion designer
- Luca Van Assche (born 2004), French tennis player
- Erik Van Assche (born 1984),

Professional Snowboarder
