= Filip van As =

Dutch politician

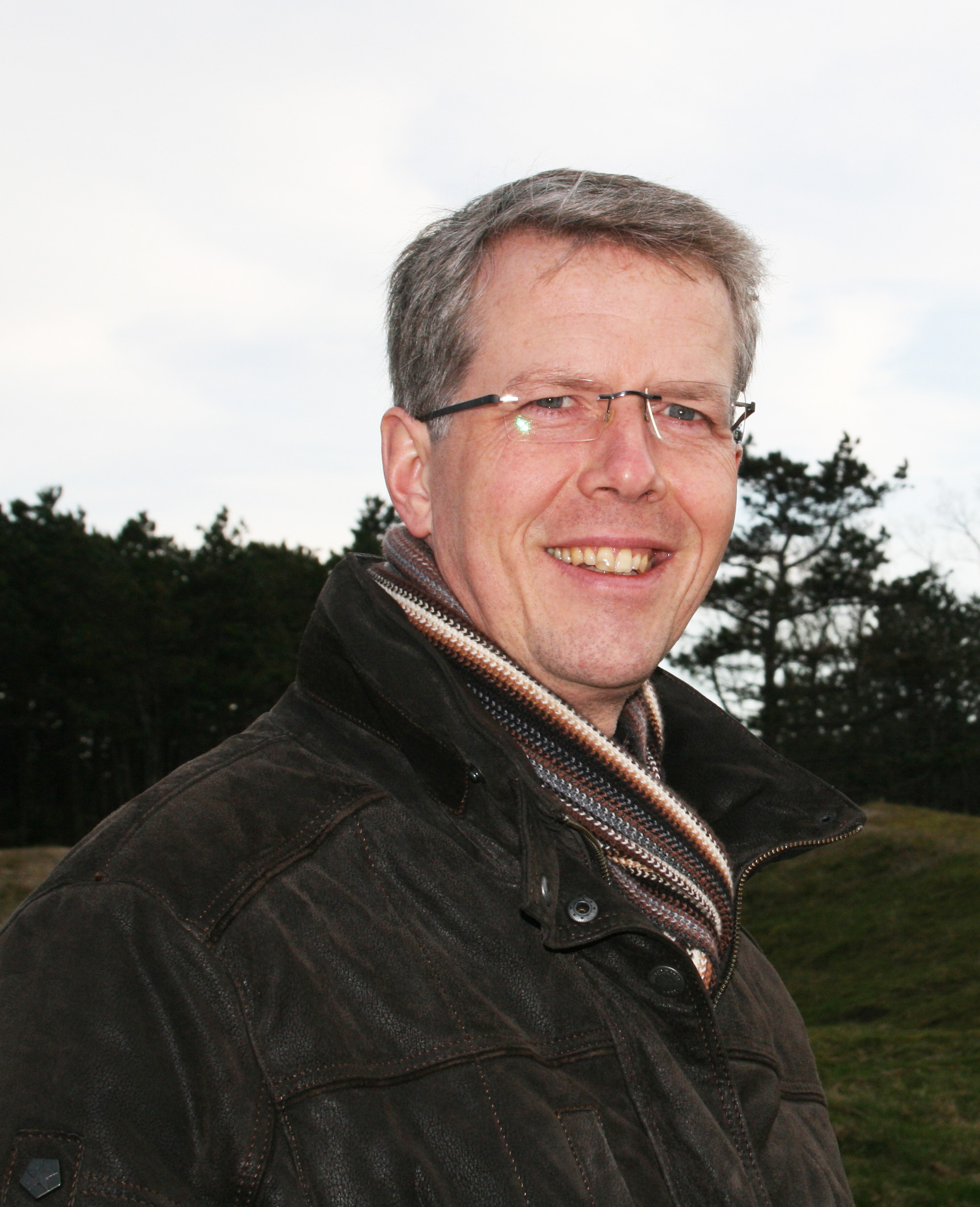
Filip van As

Filip Martijn van As (born 1966 in Den Helder) is a Dutch politician, on behalf of the party the ChristianUnion (ChristenUnie) and previously for the Reformatory Political Federation (Reformatorische Politieke Federatie). He was in local governments in Leiden and Dronten, and currently is in Zwolle.
