= S v Van As =

Case of South African criminal law

In S v Van As en 'n Ander, an important case in South African criminal law, the police were locking a suspect in a patrol van, when the young children in his company disappeared. The following morning, after a search in vain the night before, two of them were found dead from exposure. The police were charged with and convicted of culpable homicide. On appeal, however, the court held that, although it would have been reasonable to continue the search and to make further inquiries, it had not been proved beyond reasonable doubt that the children would have been found by a proper search. It also had not been so proved that the failure to institute such a search was responsible for the children's deaths.

== See also ==
- South African criminal law
