= Asch, Netherlands =

Asch
- Village
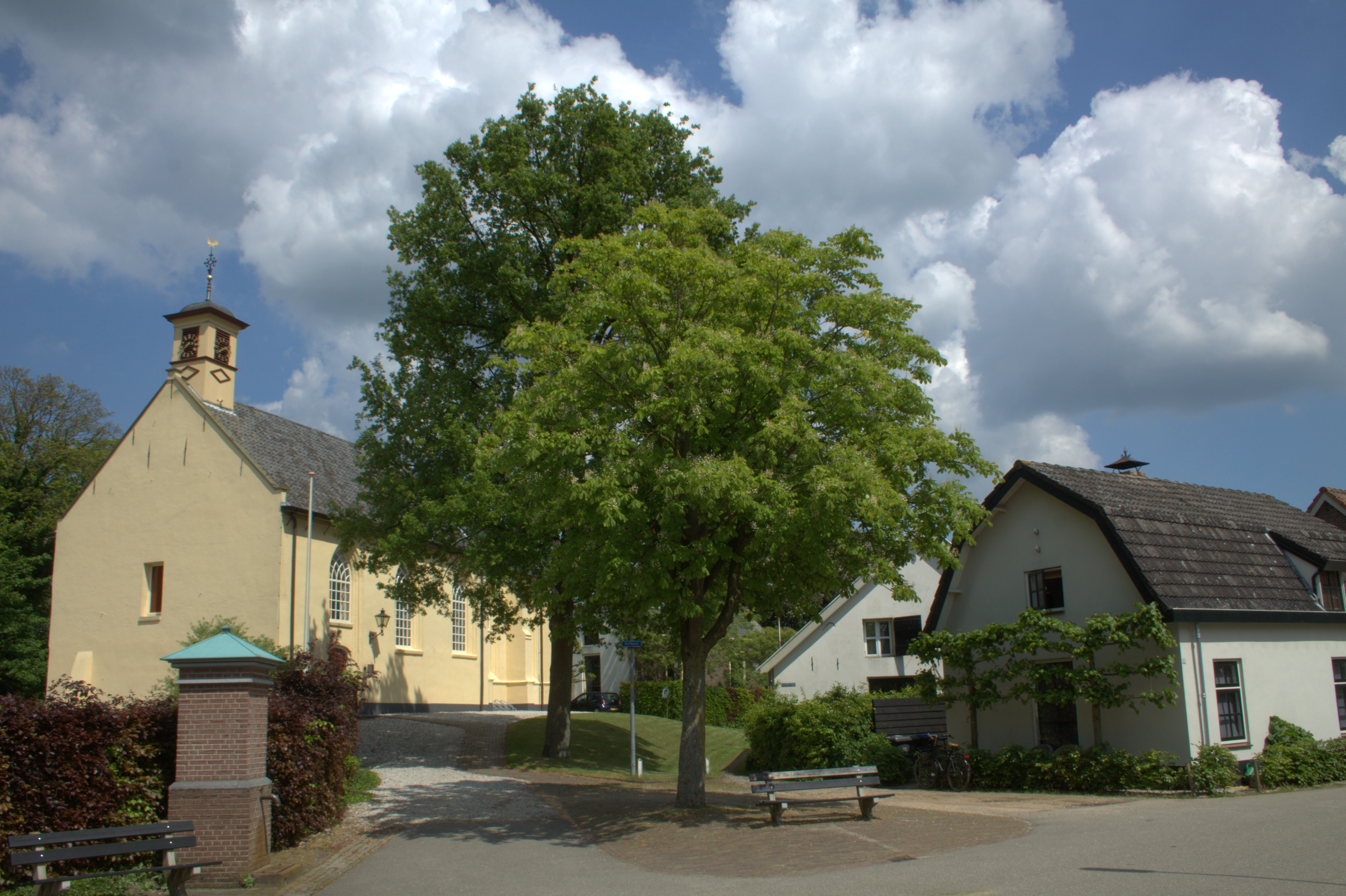

- Location in the province of Gelderland Asch (Netherlands)
- Country: Netherlands
- Province: Gelderland
- Municipality: Buren

Area
  - Total: 6.11 km^{2} (2.36 sq mi)
- Elevation: 4 m (13 ft)

Population (2021)
  - Total: 395
  - Density: 64.6/km^{2} (167/sq mi)
- Time zone: UTC+1 (CET)
  - Summer (DST): UTC+2 (CEST)
- Postal code: 4115
- Dialing code: 0345

Asch is a village in the Dutch province of Gelderland. It is a part of the municipality of Buren, and lies about 9 km northwest of Tiel.

It was first mentioned in 889 as Alke. The etymology is unclear. In 1335, there was a chapel in Asch. Around 1518, a church was built. In 1820, Asch was flooded, and the church was abandoned in favour of neighbouring Buren. In 1823, the tower was demolished, and the church was turned into a shelter for high water. In 1839, a new church constructed. In 1840, it was home to 1840 people.

== Gallery ==
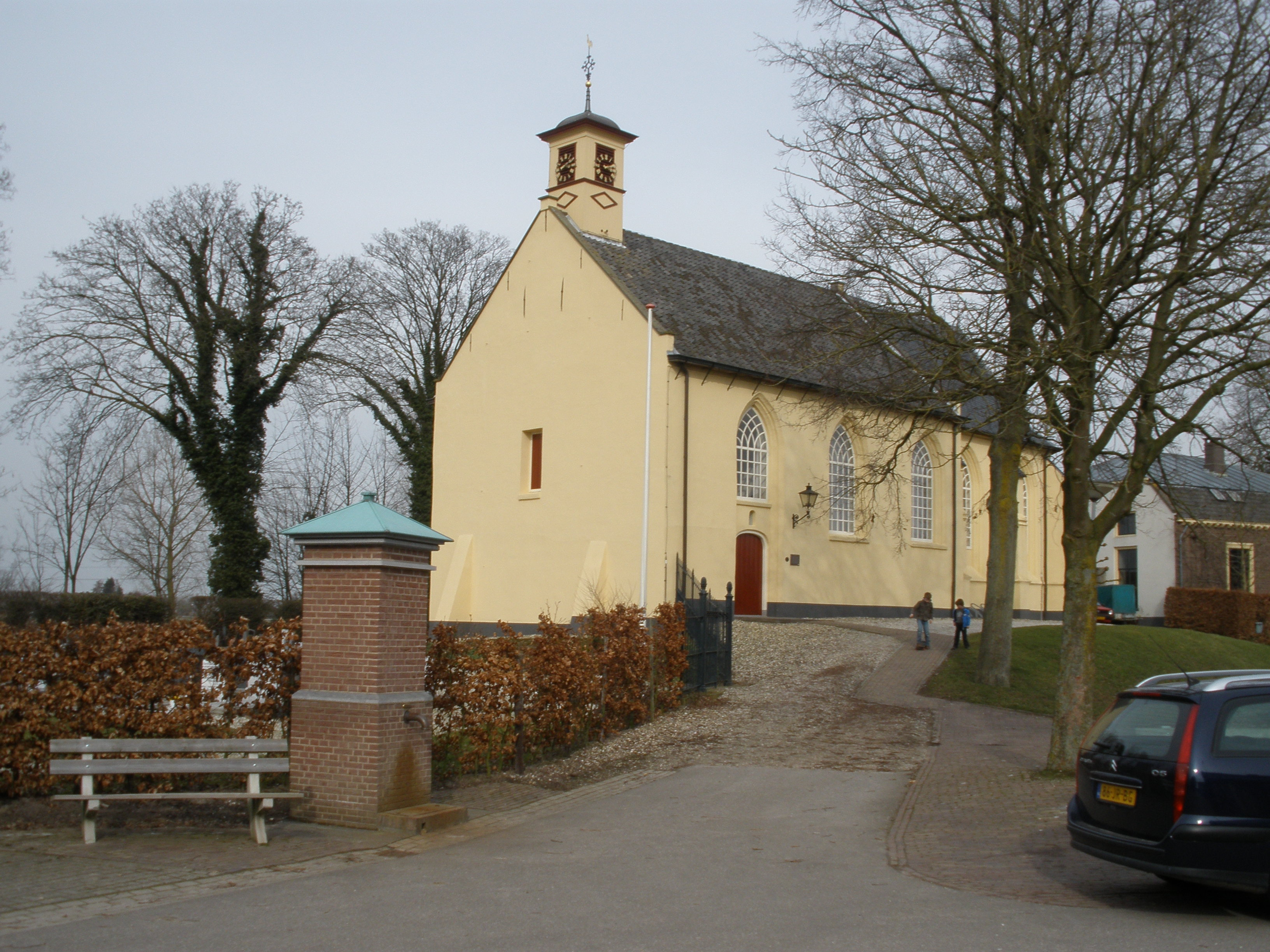
St. Catharina Church

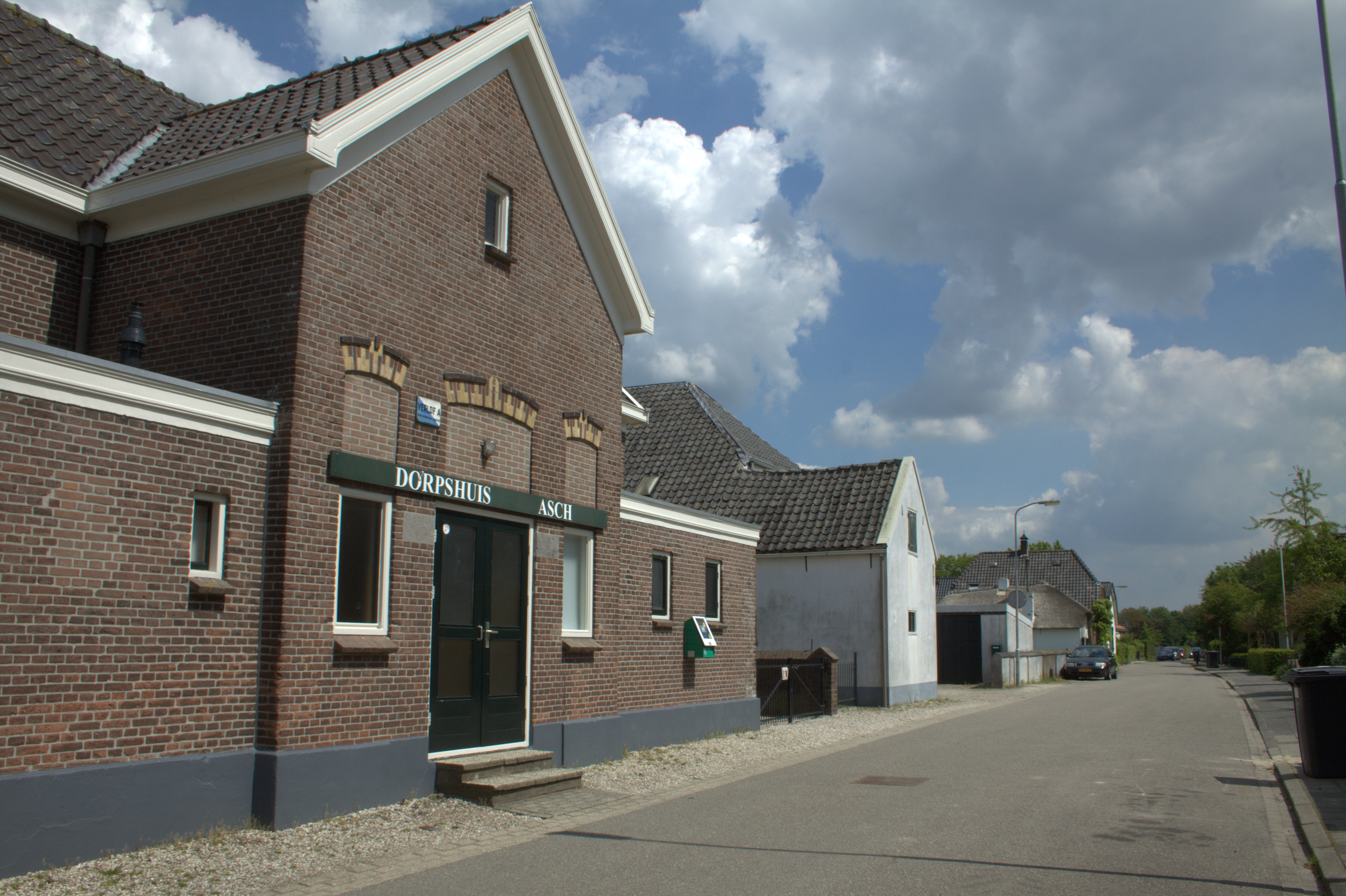
Village house

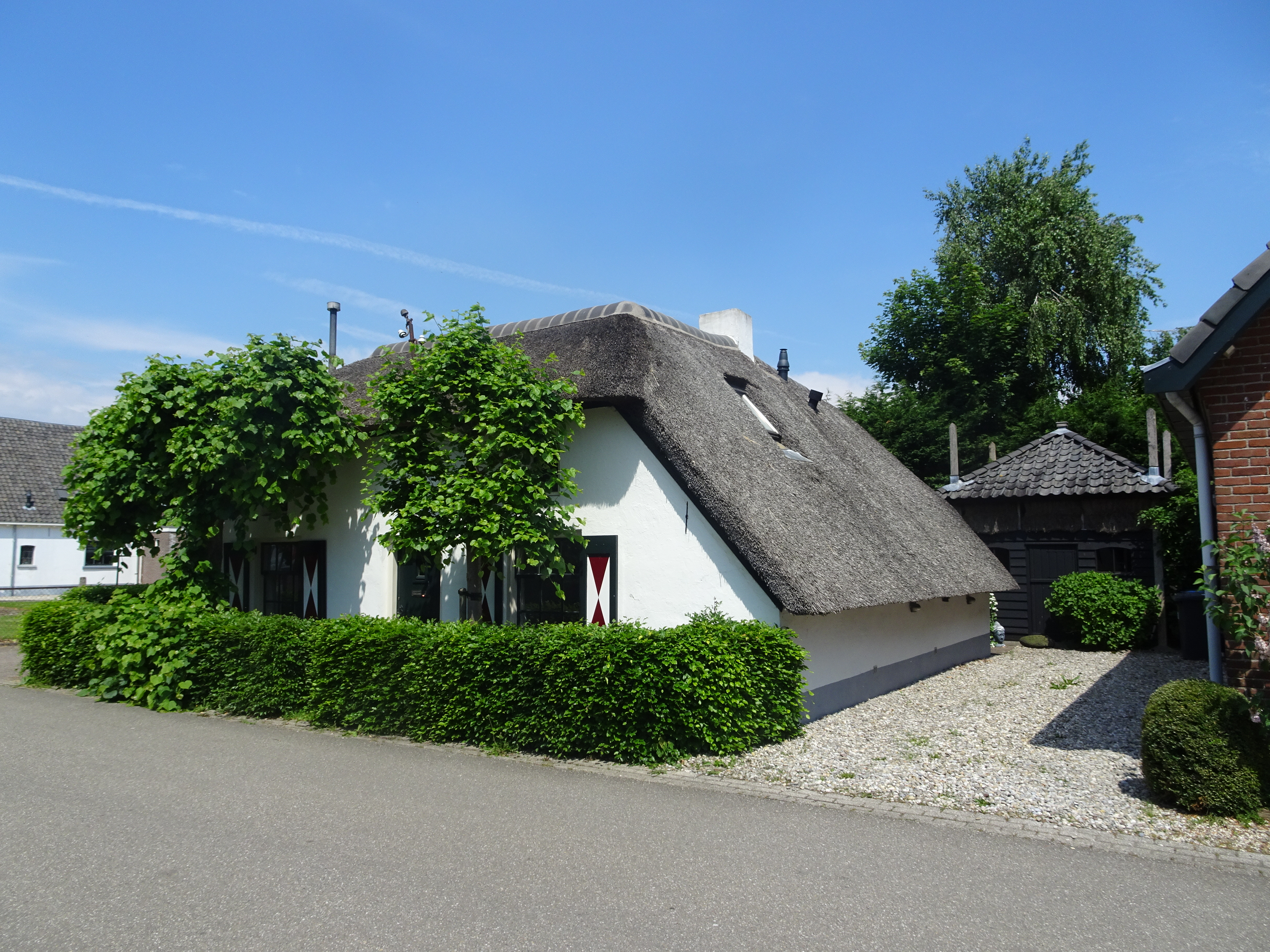
Farm in Asch

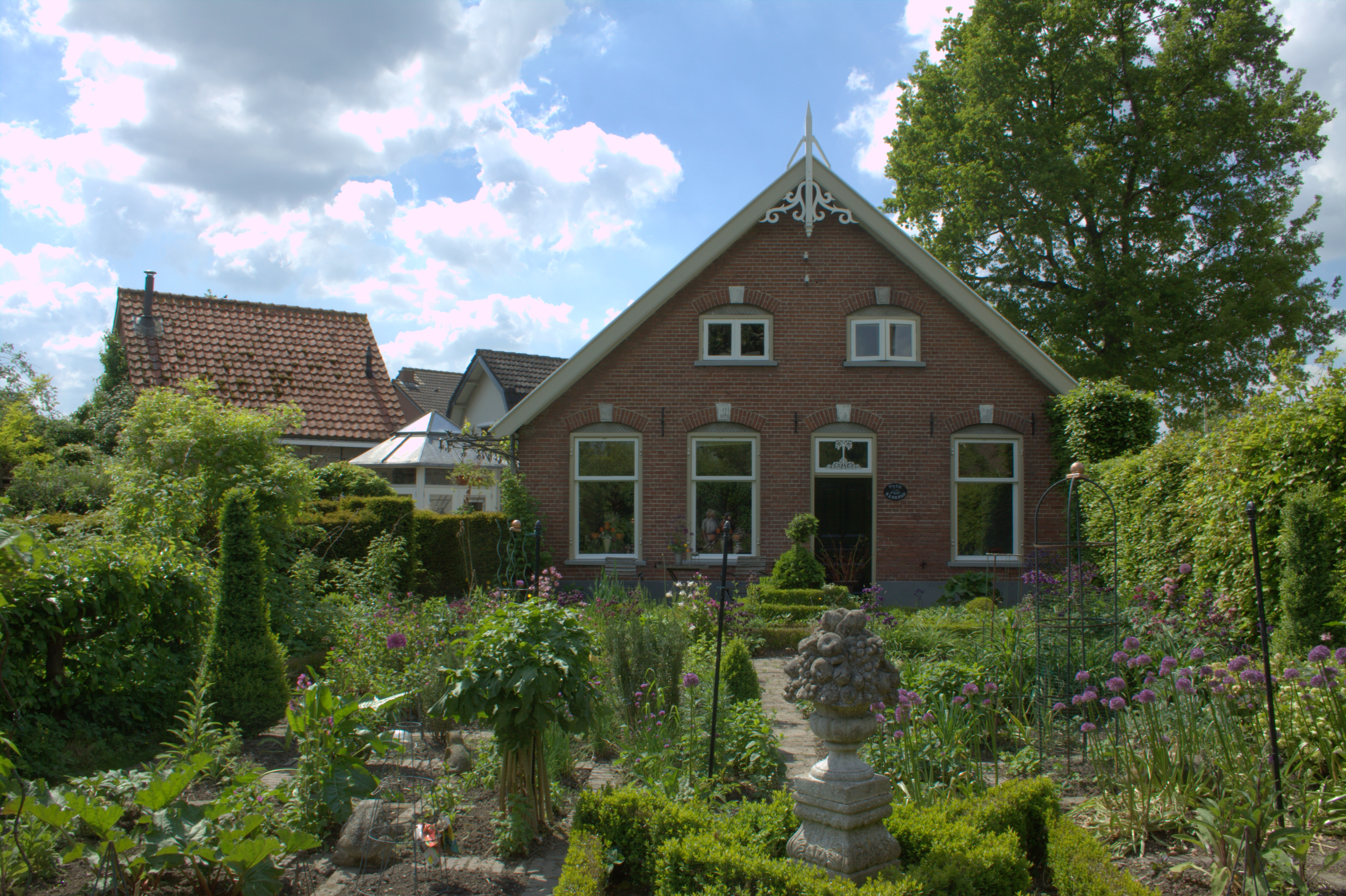
Farm in Asch
