= Est =

Est, est, or EST may refer to:

== Arts and entertainment ==
- est: The Steersman Handbook, a science fiction book published in 1970
- Ed Sullivan Theater, New York, built in 1927
- Ensemble Studio Theatre, New York, founded in 1968
- Esbjörn Svensson Trio, a Swedish jazz trio
- E.S.T. (band), a Soviet and Russian heavy metal band featured in the 1992 film For Those About to Rock: Monsters in Moscow
- E.S.T., a song by British band White Lies from their 2009 album To Lose My Life...
- E.S.T. - Trip to the Moon, a song by Alien Sex Fiend from their 1984 album Acid Bath

== Languages ==
- -est, the superlative suffix in English
- -est, an archaic verb ending in English
- Estonian language, an ISO 639 code
- European Society for Translation Studies
- Extended standard theory, a generative grammar framework

== People ==
- Diana Est (born 1963), an Italian singer
- EST Gee (born 1994), an American rapper
- Michael Est (c. 1580–1648), an English composer
- Thomas Est (c. 1540–1609), an English printer
- Van Est, a Dutch surname
- Estonians, a Finnic ethnic group

== Places ==
=== Africa ===
- Est Department, a former division of Ivory Coast
- Est Province, Rwanda
- Est Region (Burkina Faso)
- Est Region (Cameroon)

=== Europe ===
- Est (Chamber of Deputies of Luxembourg constituency), an electoral constituency in Luxembourg
- Est, Netherlands, a town in Gelderland
- Estonia (ISO 3166 alpha-3 code: EST)

=== North America ===
- Eastern Canada (French: Est du Canada)

== Science and medicine ==
- Edinburgh Science Triangle, a multi-disciplinary partnership in Scotland
- Electroconvulsive therapy, formerly electroshock therapy, a form of treatment
- Endodermal sinus tumor, a cancerous germ cell tumor
- Estrone sulfotransferase, an enzyme catalyzing the transformation of an unconjugated estrogen into a sulfated estrogen
- European Solar Telescope, a proposed observatory
- Expressed sequence tag, a short sub-sequence of a cDNA sequence

== Technology ==
- Electron spiral toroid, a claimed small stable plasma toroid
- Electronic sell-through, a method of media distribution
- Enrollment over Secure Transport, a cryptographic protocol

== Time zones ==
- Eastern Standard Time (North America) (UTC−5)
- European Summer Time (from UTC to UTC+3)
- Egypt Standard Time (UTC+2)
- Australian Eastern Standard Time (UTC+10)

== Other uses ==
- Eastern Sierra Transit, a transit agency in California
- Energy Saving Trust, a British organization for fighting climate change, formed in 1992
- Erhard Seminars Training (est), a New Age large-group awareness training program, 1971–1984
- Espérance Sportive de Tunis, a Tunisian multi-sports club, founded in 1919
- Est Cola, a Thai soft drink, launched in 2012
- Effort satisficing theory, a decision-making strategy; see Satisficing § Effort satisficing theory

== See also ==
- Est! Est!! Est!!! di Montefiascone, an Italian wine appellation
- East (disambiguation)
