= Waardenburg (disambiguation) =

Waardenburg is a town in the municipality of Neerijnen, province of Gelderland, Netherlands.

The Dutch name Waardenburg may also refer to:

- Waardenburg Castle, a fortification in the Dutch municipality of Neerijnen
- Waardenburg syndrome, a genetic disorder
- Petrus Johannes Waardenburg (1886–1979), a Dutch ophthalmologist and geneticist
- Dokter Faust van Waardenburg, a Dutch folklore character
- Stephan Lucien Joseph van Waardenburg, first governor of Dutch New Guinea

== See also ==
- Wardenburg, Germany
