= Est en Opijnen =

Coordinates: 51.829147°N 5.297899°E

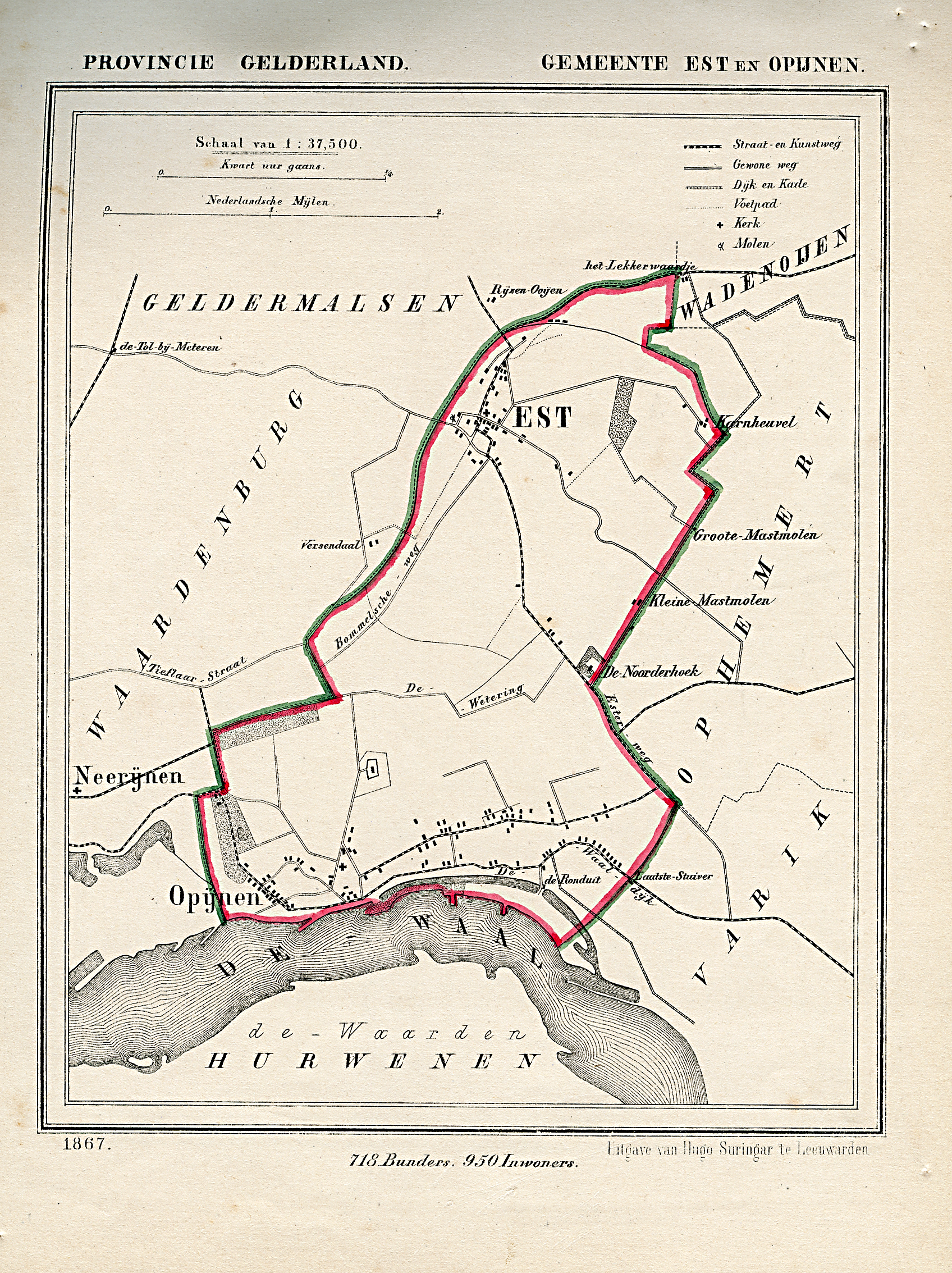
Est en Opijnen (1867)

Coat of Arms of Est en Opijnen

Est en Opijnen is a former municipality in the Dutch province of Gelderland. It existed until 1978, when it was merged with Neerijnen. Before 1818, the municipality was called Opijnen.

The municipality covered the villages of Est and Opijnen.
