= Teun Beijnen =

Dutch rower (1899–1949)

Personal information
- Born: Anthonie Christiaan Beijnen; 13 June 1899 Ophemert, Netherlands
- Died: 13 July 1949 (aged 50) Beusichem, Netherlands

Sport
- Sport: Rowing
- Club: D.S.R.V. Laga
Medal record
Men's rowing
Representing the Netherlands
Olympic Games
Gold medal – first place	1924 Paris	Coxless pair
European Rowing Championships
Silver medal – second place	1923 Como	Coxed four
Gold medal – first place	1924 Zürich	Coxed pair
Silver medal – second place	1924 Zürich	Coxless pair
Silver medal – second place	1925 Prague	Eight
Gold medal – first place	1926 Lucerne	Eight

Anthoni "Teun" Christiaan Beijnen (13 June 1899 – 13 July 1949) was a Dutch rower who competed in the 1924 Summer Olympics and in the 1928 Summer Olympics.

Beijnen was born in 1899 in Ophemert, Gelderland. In 1924 he won the gold medal with his partner Willy Rösingh in the coxless pair event. Four years later he was part of the Dutch boat which was eliminated in the second round of the men's eight competition.

Beijnen was a car enthusiast and twice raced in the Monte Carlo Rally.

Beijnen, who had been a heavy smoker, died in 1949 in Beusichem of heart failure aged 50.
