= CBG =

CBG may refer to:

== Finance ==
- CB Richard Ellis, former NYSE ticker symbol
- Central Bank of The Gambia
- Compagnie des Bauxites de Guinée

== Media and culture ==
- CBG (AM), a CBC Radio One station in Newfoundland, Canada
- Chongqing Broadcasting Group
- Comic Book Guy, a character on The Simpsons
- Comics Buyer's Guide
- Congressional Baseball Game

== Military ==
- Carrier battle group
- Canadian Brigade Group

== Places ==
- Cambodia, ITU country code
- Cambridge Airport, IATA airport code
- Cambridge railway station, National Rail station code
- Australian National Botanic Gardens, herbarium code

== Science and technology ==
- Cannabigerol, minor cannabinoid
- CBG Centrum voor familiegeschiedenis, research centre in the Netherlands
- Corticosteroid-binding globulin, protein found in animals

== Other uses ==
- Chimila language (cbg), ISO 639-3 code
