= Ophemert =

- Village
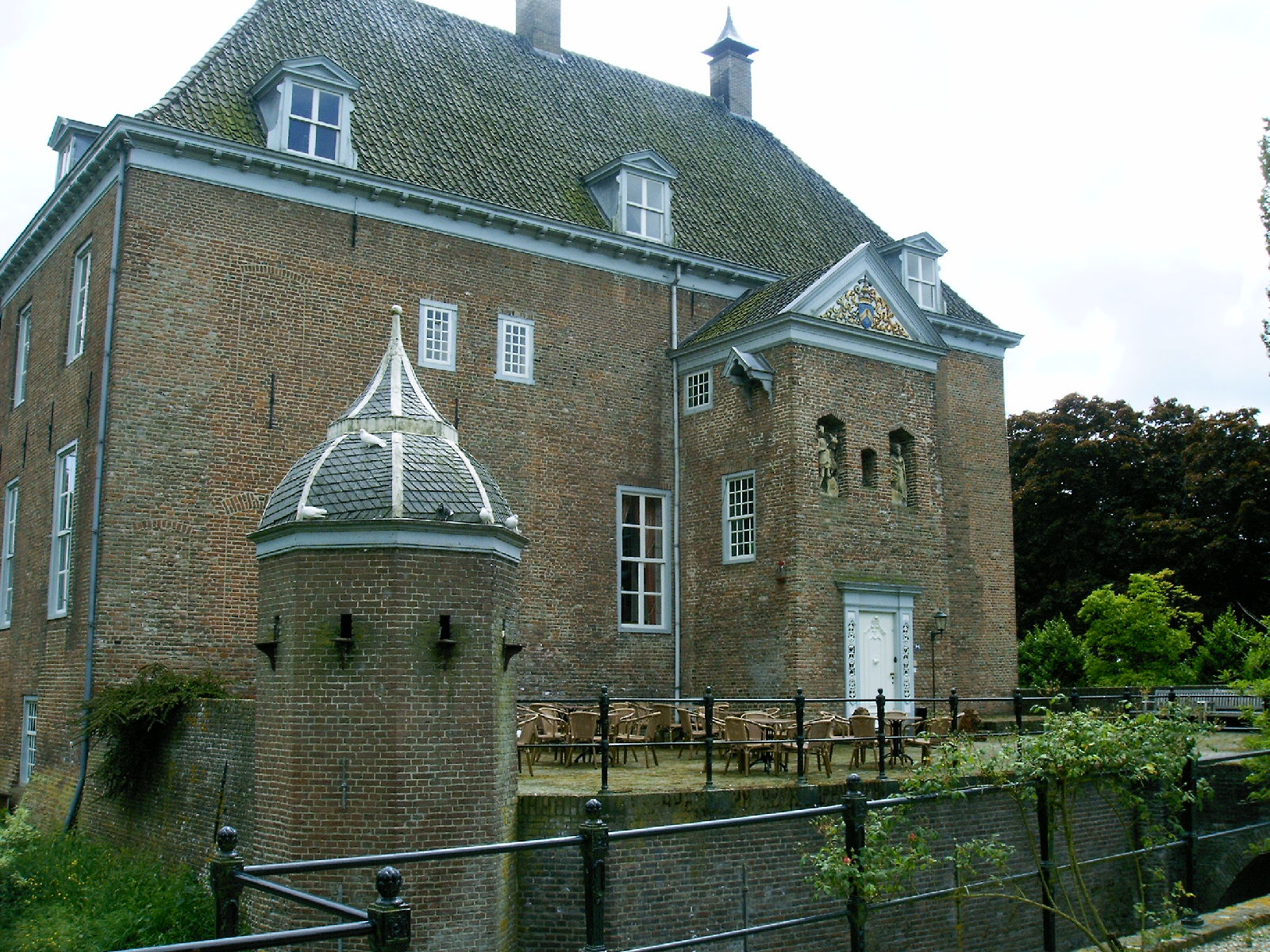
- Ophemert Castle

- Coat of arms

- Location in the Netherlands Ophemert (Netherlands)
- Coordinates: 51°50′43″N 5°23′3″E
- Country: Netherlands
- Province: Gelderland
- Municipality: West Betuwe

Area
  - Total: 14.21 km^{2} (5.49 sq mi)
- Elevation: 6 m (20 ft)

Population (2021)
  - Total: 1,685
  - Density: 118.6/km^{2} (307.1/sq mi)
- Time zone: UTC+1 (CET)
  - Summer (DST): UTC+2 (CEST)
- Postal code: 4061
- Dialing code: 0344

Ophemert is a village in the Dutch province of Gelderland. It is a part of the municipality of West Betuwe, and lies about 5 km south of Tiel.

Ophemert was a separate municipality between 1818 and 1978, when it was merged with Neerijnen.

== History ==
It was first mentioned between 800 and 850 as Hamaritda, and means stone. The origin is not clear, since Ophemert is located along the Waal. Ophemert developed as a stretched out esdorp along the river.

In the 14th century, the castle Huis Ophemert was constructed to the north of the village. The castle received its current shape around 1700. The Dutch Reformed Church dates from the early 16th century. It was heavily damaged during World War II and was restored in neo-gothic style around 1955. In 1840, Ophemert was home to 985 people.

In the winter of 1944 to 1945, Ophemert was subject to shelling. The Allied forces were on the other side of the river, and the Germans were in Ophemert. The fighting resulted in the destruction of a large part of the village was destroyed which was rebuilt after the war.

The pumping mill Poldermolen in Wadenoijen was built in 1888 as a replacement of a wind mill which burned down in 1887. In the 1970s, the location became problematic, because it could no longer pump water. In 2010, it was decided to move the windmill to Ophemert and since 2018, it is back in operation.

== Notable people ==
- Teun Beijnen (1899–1949), rower who competed in the 1924 and 1928 Summer Olympics
- Hugh Mackay, 14th Lord Reay, Baron Mackay of Ophemert and Zennewijnen (1937-2013), Member of the House of Lords, Member of the European Parliament from 1973 to 1979 and former member of the Council of Europe who owned an estate in Ophemert.

== Gallery ==
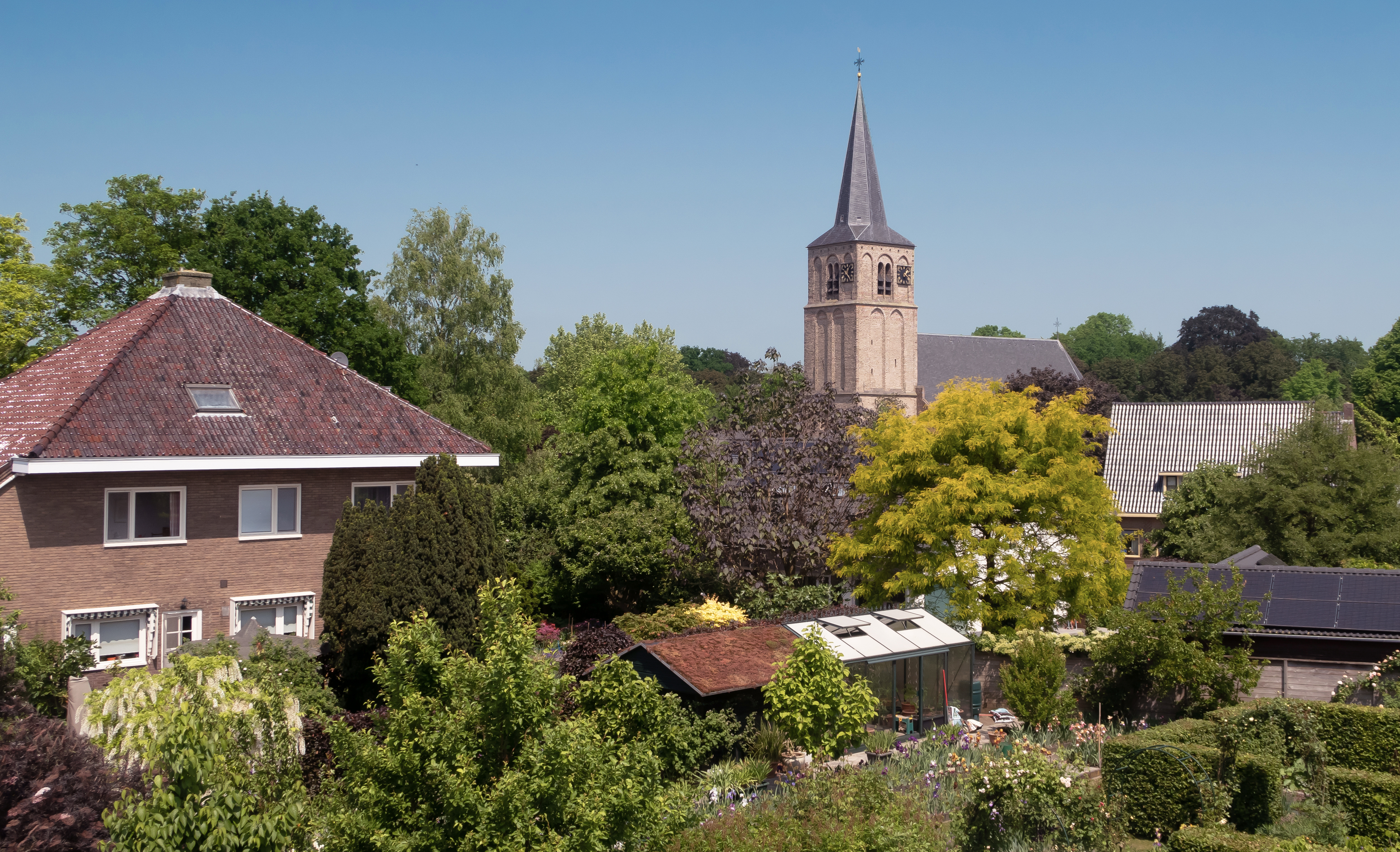
Ophemert, view to the village from the Waalbandijk with reformed church

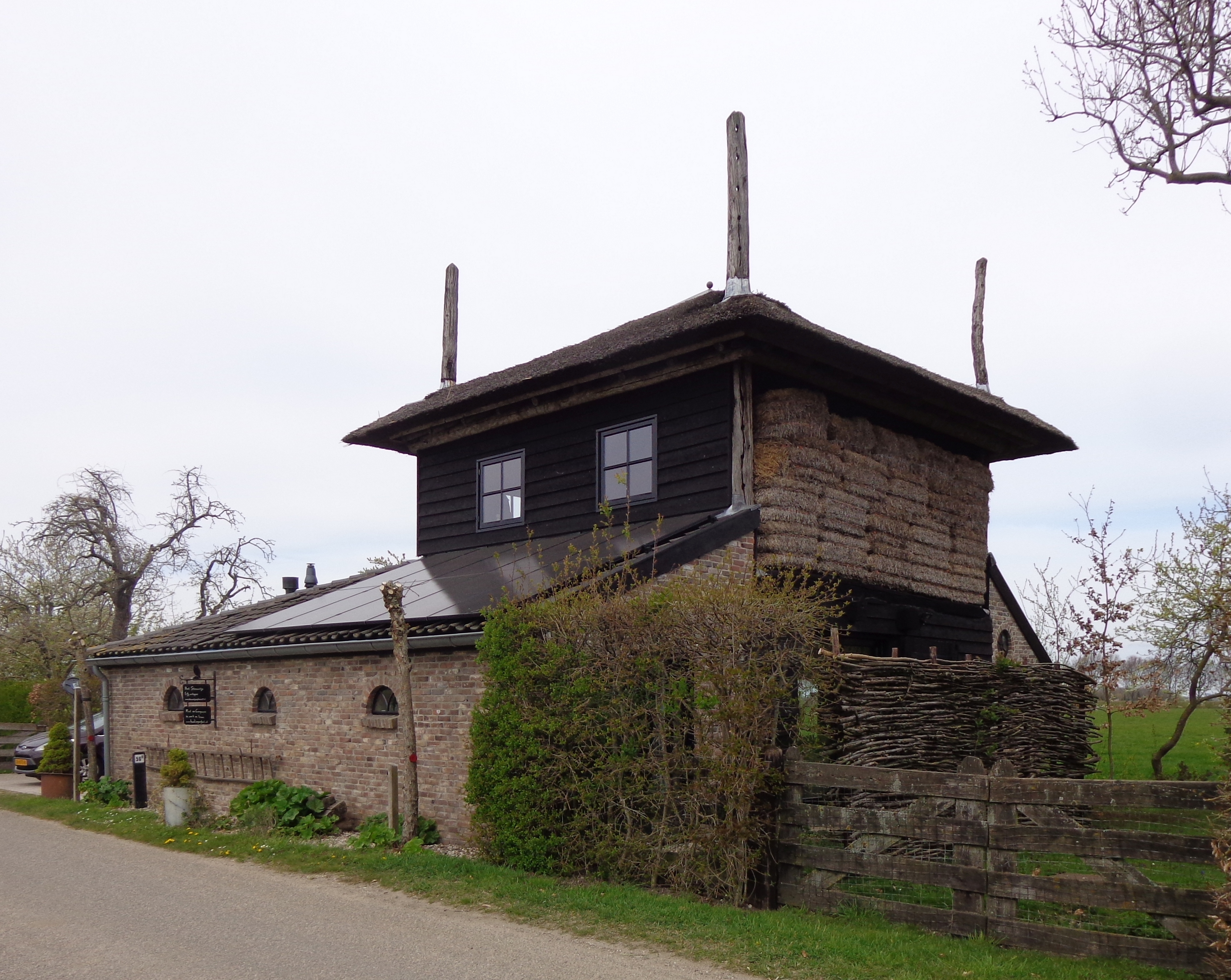
Haystack

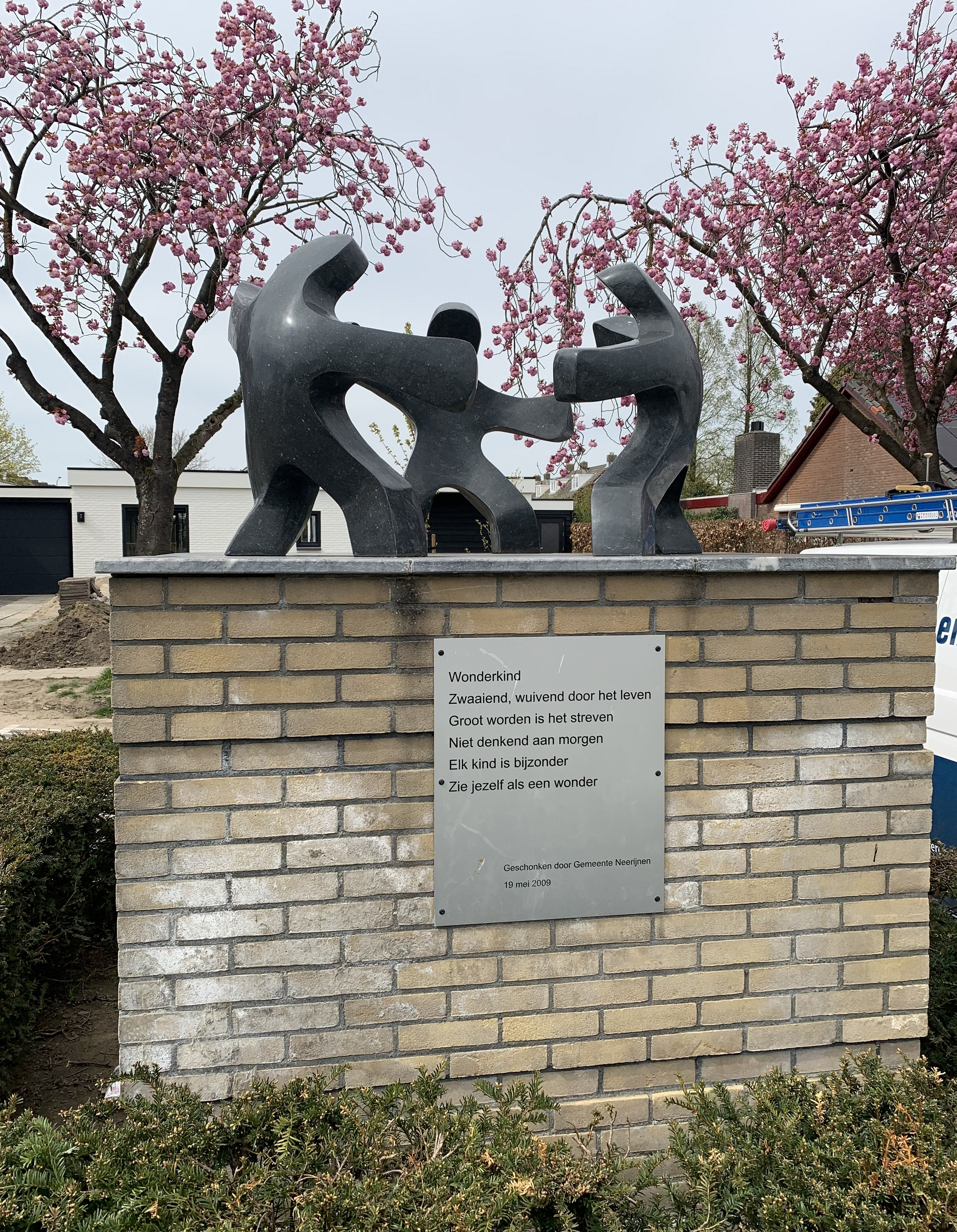
Wonder child statue

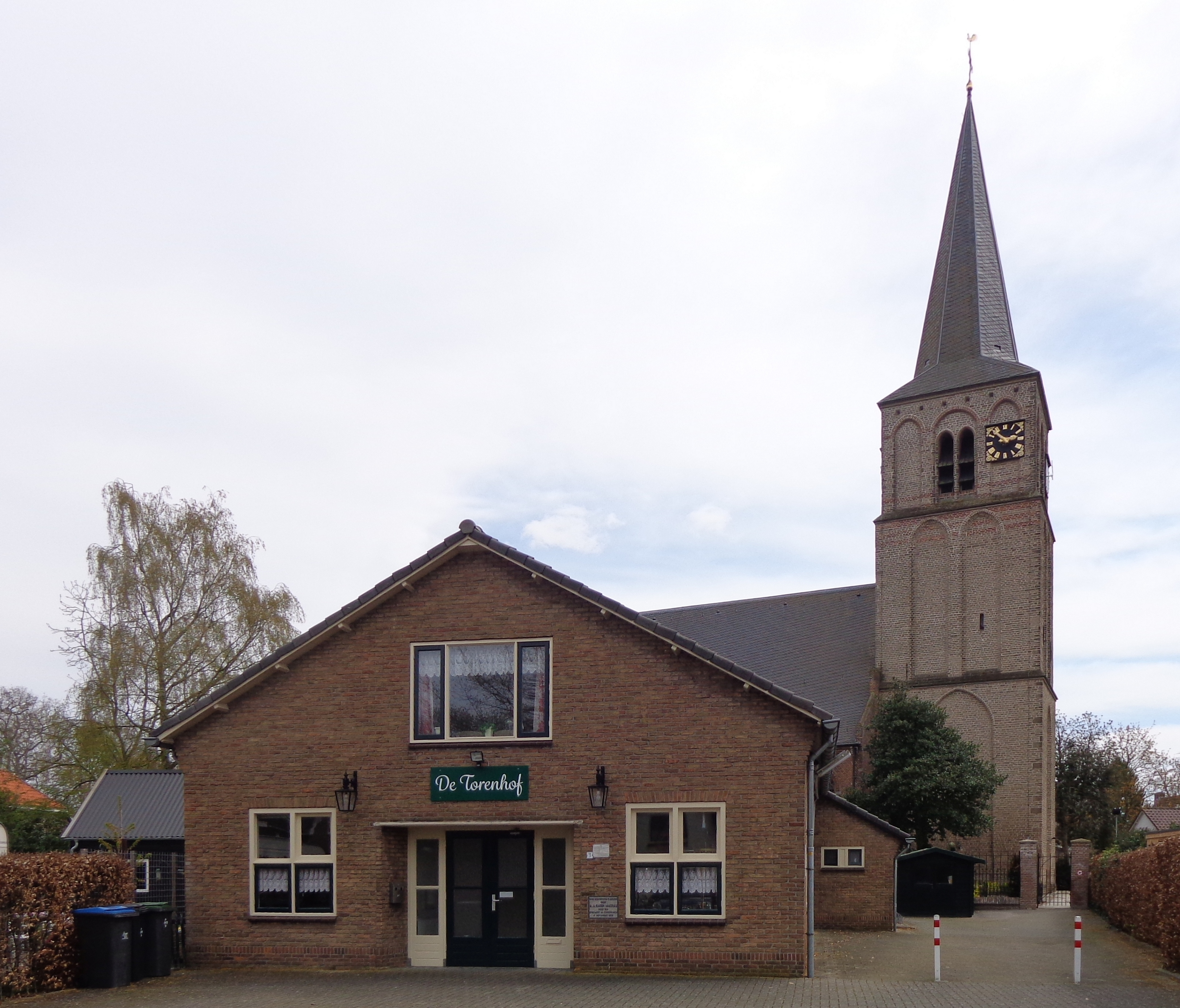
Dutch Reformed Church
