= Waardenburg Castle =

Dutch castle

Coordinates: 51.8318°N 5.2667°E

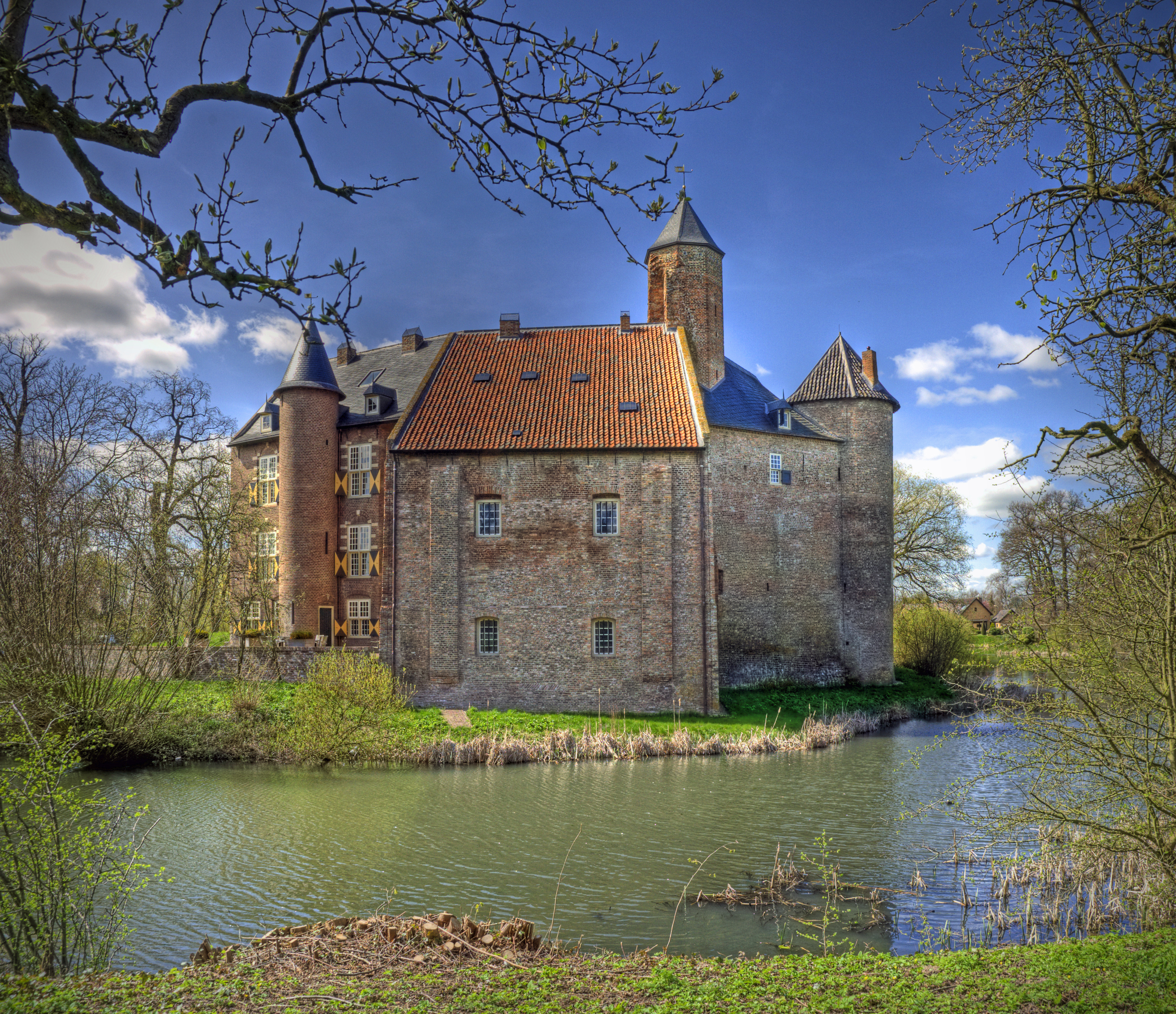
Waardenburg Castle

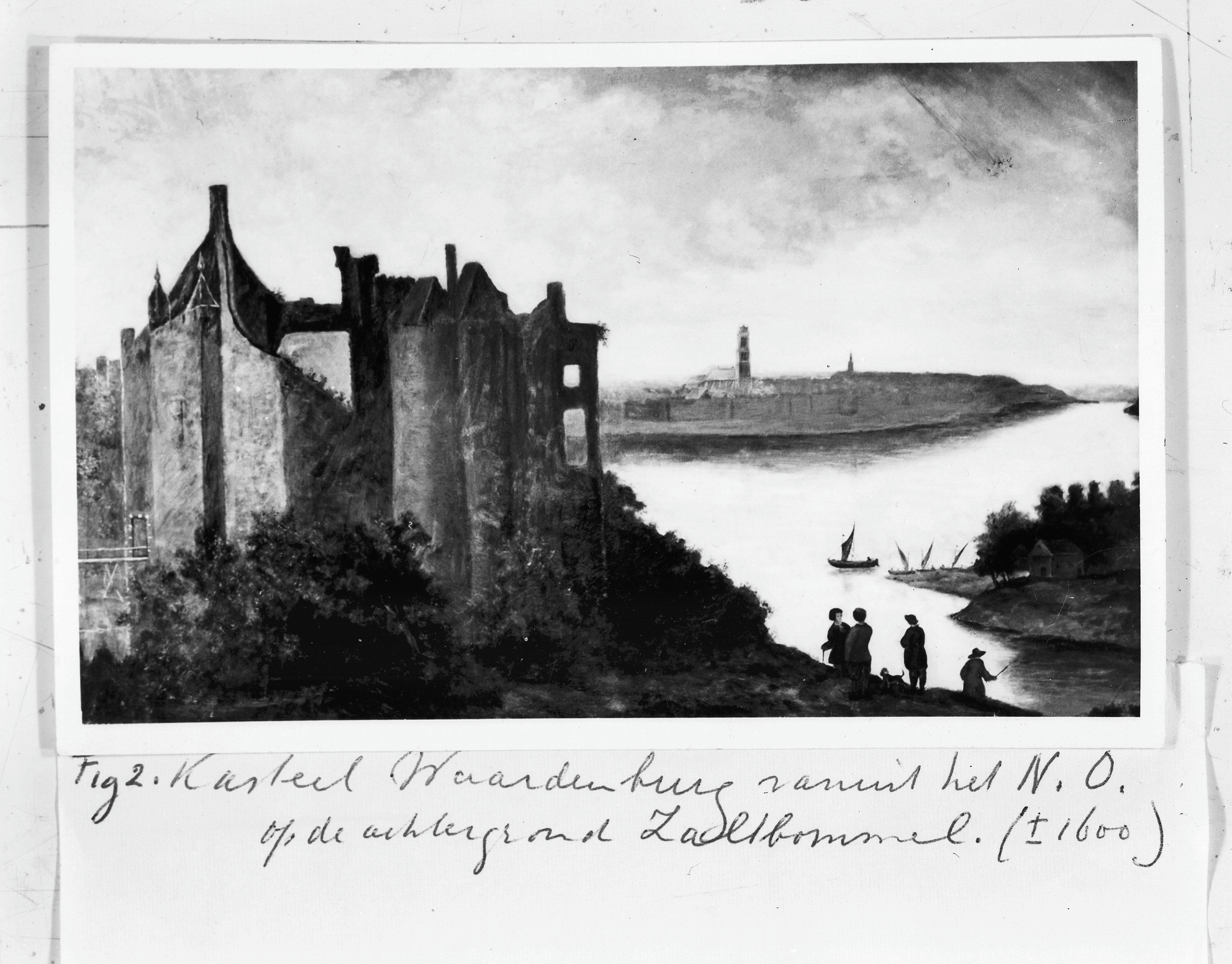
Waardenburg around 1600 (RCE)

Waardenburg Castle, sometimes also called Weerdenburg, is a medieval castle located in Waardenburg in the municipality of West Betuwe, in the Dutch province of Gelderland.

== History ==
The date of foundation of Waardenburg Castle is precisely known: on 5 August 1265, Count Otto II of Gelre gave the villages Hiern, Neerijnen, and Opijnen to Rudolph de Cock, knight, who gave his possessions in Rhenoy in return. When this Rudolph had received the village of Hiern (the old name of the village of Waardenburg) on loan, he wanted to settle there too. So he asked the liege lord for permission to build a house. Count Otto gave permission for this, but the building could not cost more than 300 Leuvense pounds.

Rudolph's eponymous son succeeded him and expanded the house, as did his son Johan later. Only the heiress Agnes came from the marriage of Gerard de Cock and Henrica van Culemborg, who transferred the possessions to Willem van Broeckhuysen through her marriage (shortly before 1385) . He died in 1415 and the building came to the eldest of nine children, namely Willem. When this Willem died soon, it went to his brother Johan van Broeckhuysen (a tall and fat man according to the Waardenburg chronicle), who married Adriana van Brakel. Their son Gerard van Broeckhuysen married Walraven from the Brederode house in 1434. Their son Johan was given access to Waardenburg at the age of about ten and died in 1468. In 1470 his only and minor son Gerard succeeded him. His sister Walraven succeeded him in 1494 and married Otto van Arkel, bringing the building into this family.

In 1574, the castle was destroyed by Louis of Nassau, brother of William I, Prince of Orange. The then resident, Catharina van Gelre, bastard daughter of Karel van Gelre, widow of Walraven van Arkel, was Spanish-minded and refused to surrender. The damage was considerable and the lock never recovered from this blow. Her grandson, Thomas van Thiennes, sold it to Johan Vijgh in 1618. In 1700 it was bought by the Frisian noble family Van Aylva . In 1800 Anna Jacoba Wilhelmina van Aylva married Frederik baron van Pallandt. Until the death of Julie Eliza baroness van Pallandt (1898-1971), the van Pallandt family owned the castle. Waardenburg passed on in 1971 to her great-nephew Jhr. CLH Vredenburch (1932), who transferred it in 1975 on a long lease to Het Geldersch Landschap / Friends of Geldersche Kasteelen.

== Architecture ==
The first castle was probably made of wood. The son of the founder Rudolph de Cock built "den sael ende Ronde tour" in 1283. In 1355 the fourth lord (Johan de Cock) built a large square tower of four floors with roof, wall walk and Bartizan turrets in the east end with the ring wall and the outer bailey. This keep still exists, but is now one floor below and has a pent roof. He also had a ring wall built and a moat constructed, which surrounded the castle with an outer bailey. This made it a large round castle.

After the destruction in 1574, the ruin was made habitable again in 1627. In 1895, the owner restored it and added a turret on the east side. The castle was damaged in World War II during the bombing of the nearby Bommelse Brug and was declared uninhabitable in 1957. AF van Goelst Meyer (1892-1990) then carried out a large-scale restoration. The building currently has about half its original size, with mostly old parts being preserved.

== See also ==
- List of castles in the Netherlands

== Literature ==
- Zijlstra, Evert, A.P. van Schilfgaarde en D.J.G. Buurman (1962), Kastelen en huizen in de Betuwe
- M.A. Beelaerts van Blokland, 'Van Aylva', in: De Nederlandsche Leeuw 106 (1989), p. 14-62 (eigendomsgeschiedenis Van Aylva).
- Nederland's Adelsboek 89 (2000-2001), p. 275-349 (eigendomsgeschiedenis Van Pallandt).
- Nederland's Adelsboek 97 (2012), p. 71-94 (eigendomsgeschiedenis Van Vredenburch).
- Jas, Jorien (2013), 'Waardenburg' in: Kastelen in Gelderland p. 360-364
