= Willy Rösingh =

Dutch rower (1900–1976)

Personal information
- Born: Wilhelm Hermann Conrad Enno Rösingh; 2 December 1900 Amsterdam, Netherlands
- Died: 5 June 1976 (aged 75) Amsterdam, Netherlands

Sport
- Sport: Rowing
- Club: Laga, Delft
Medal record
Men's rowing
Representing the Netherlands
Olympic Games
| Gold medal – first place | 1924 Paris | Coxless pair |
European Rowing Championships
| Silver medal – second place | 1923 Como | Coxed four |
| Gold medal – first place | 1924 Zürich | Coxed pair |

Wilhelm Hermann Conrad Enno Rösingh (2 December 1900 – 5 June 1976) was a Dutch rower who competed in the 1924 Summer Olympics. Rösingh was born in Amsterdam in 1900. In 1924 he won the gold medal with his partner Teun Beijnen in the coxless pair event. He died in Amsterdam on 5 June 1976.
