= Rowing at the 1924 Summer Olympics – Men's coxless pair =

Men's coxless pairs at the Games of the VIII Olympiad
- Venue: Seine
- Dates: 13–17 July 1924
- Competitors: 6 from 3 nations

Medalists
1st place, gold medalist(s)		Teun Beijnen, Willy Rösingh; Netherlands
2nd place, silver medalist(s)		Maurice Monney-Bouton, Georges Piot; France

The men's coxless pairs event was part of the rowing programme at the 1924 Summer Olympics. The competition, the third appearance of the event, was held from 13 to 17 July 1924 on the river Seine.

Five teams had been entered in the race: The Dutch, the French, the British, the American and the Swiss. However, The American team and the Swiss team did not join the race, so only three teams were left.

The organisation still organised a semi-final. In the first semi-final, the British team rowed against the French team, and the French team won. The Dutch team had a walk-over in their semi-final. Then, the British team was allowed a rematch. They were the only team, so they won their race and were also in the final. One of the two British rowers was injured however, so they did not start the final.

In the final race between the French and the Dutch, the Dutch took the early lead. Halfway, the French team accelerated, but not fast enough to catch the Dutch team.

== Results ==
=== Semifinals ===
Semifinal 1
Place	Rowers	Time	Qual.
1	Maurice Monney-Bouton (FRA); Georges Piot (FRA)	9:42.2	Q
2	Gordon Killick (GBR); Thomas Southgate (GBR)		r
Semifinal 2
Place	Rowers	Time	Qual.
1	Teun Beijnen (NED); Willy Rösingh (NED)	Walkover	Q

=== Repechage ===
Place	Rowers	Time	Qual.
1	Gordon Killick (GBR); Thomas Southgate (GBR)	Walkover	Q

=== Final ===
Final
Place	Rowers	Time
1st place, gold medalist(s)	Teun Beijnen (NED); Willy Rösingh (NED)	8:19.4
2nd place, silver medalist(s)	Maurice Monney-Bouton (FRA); Georges Piot (FRA)	8:21.6
–	Gordon Killick (GBR); Thomas Southgate (GBR)	Did not start

== Sources ==
- Evans, Hilary; Gjerde, Arild; Heijmans, Jeroen; Mallon, Bill; et al. "Rowing at the 1924 Paris Summer Games: Men's Double Sculls". Olympics at Sports-Reference.com. Sports Reference LLC. Archived from the original on 18 April 2020.
- Wudarski, Pawel (1999). "Wyniki Igrzysk Olimpijskich" (in Polish).
