= Thomas Southgate =

British rower

Personal information
- Full name: Cyril Thomas Southgate
- Nationality: British
- Born: 22 December 1894 Tetbury, England
- Died: 7 November 1970 (aged 75) Stroud, England

Sport
- Sport: Rowing
- Club: Thames Rowing Club

Cyril Thomas Southgate (22 December 1894 – 7 November 1970) was a British rower. He competed in the men's coxless pairs event at the 1924 Summer Olympics with his brother-in-law Gordon Killick.

In 1922 he was part of the Thames Rowing Club four that won the Wyfold Challenge Cup at the Henley Royal Regatta.
