= Neerijnen =

- Village and former municipality
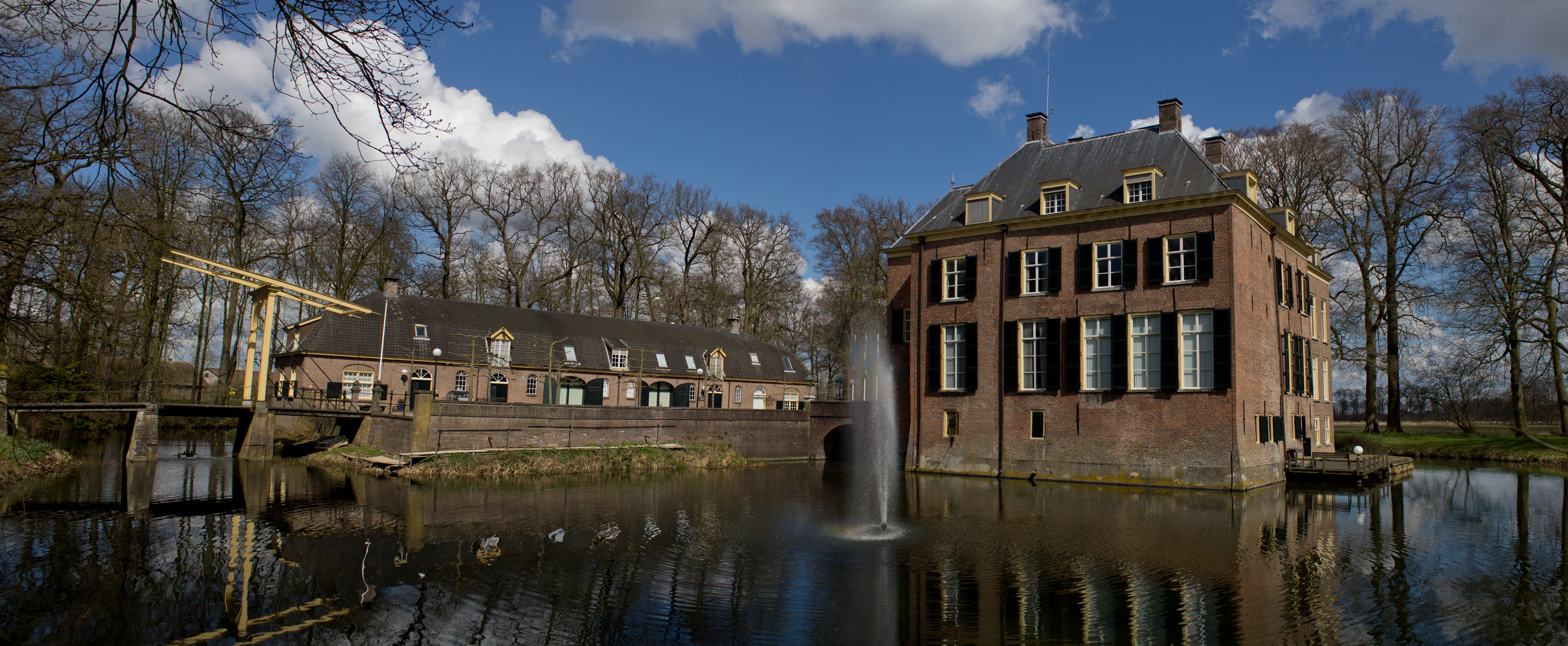
- Castle Neerijnen

- Flag Coat of arms

- Location in Gelderland

- Location in the Netherlands Neerijnen (Netherlands)
- Coordinates: 51°50′N 5°17′E
- Country: Netherlands
- Province: Gelderland
- Municipality: West Betuwe
- Merged: 2019

Area
  - Total: 6.11 km^{2} (2.36 sq mi)
- Elevation: 3 m (9.8 ft)

Population (2021)
  - Total: 465
  - Density: 76.1/km^{2} (197/sq mi)
- Time zone: UTC+1 (CET)
  - Summer (DST): UTC+2 (CEST)
- Postcode: 4182
- Area code: 0418
- Website: www.neerijnen.nl

Neerijnen (Dutch pronunciation: [neːˈrɛinə(n)]) is a village and former municipality in the Netherlands. It is about 35 kilometres (22 mi) south of Utrecht and some 15 kilometres (9.3 mi) north of 's-Hertogenbosch.

On 1 January 2019, it merged with Geldermalsen and Lingewaal to form the new municipality of West Betuwe.

== History ==
It was first mentioned in 996 as in Ine. The etymology in unclear. It is neer (lower) in comparison with Opijnen (upper). The village developed as an esdorp perpendicular to the dike of the Waal.

Neerijnen Castle was built around 1350 and formed a single estate with Waardenburg Castle. In 1574, it was under siege by William the Silent and mainly destroyed. The castle was rebuilt in 1627. In 1980, it served as town hall. In 2019, Neerijnen merged into West Betuwe, and the castle was put up for sale.

In 1840, it was home to 294 people. The Dutch Reformed Church was built in 1865.

== Former population centres ==
- Est
- Haaften
- Heesselt
- Hellouw
- Neerijnen
- Ophemert
- Opijnen
- Tuil
- Varik
- Waardenburg

=== Topography ===
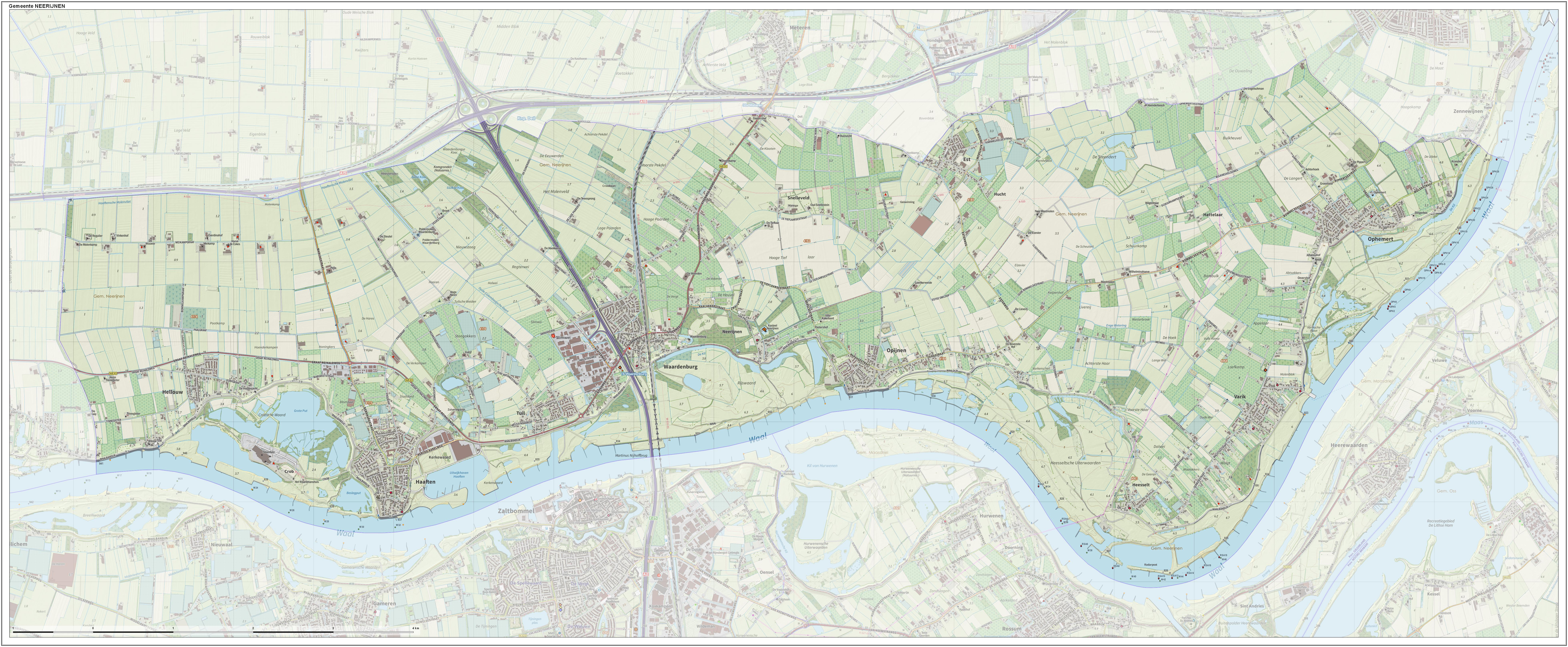

Dutch Topographic map of the municipality of Neerijnen, June 2015

== Gallery ==
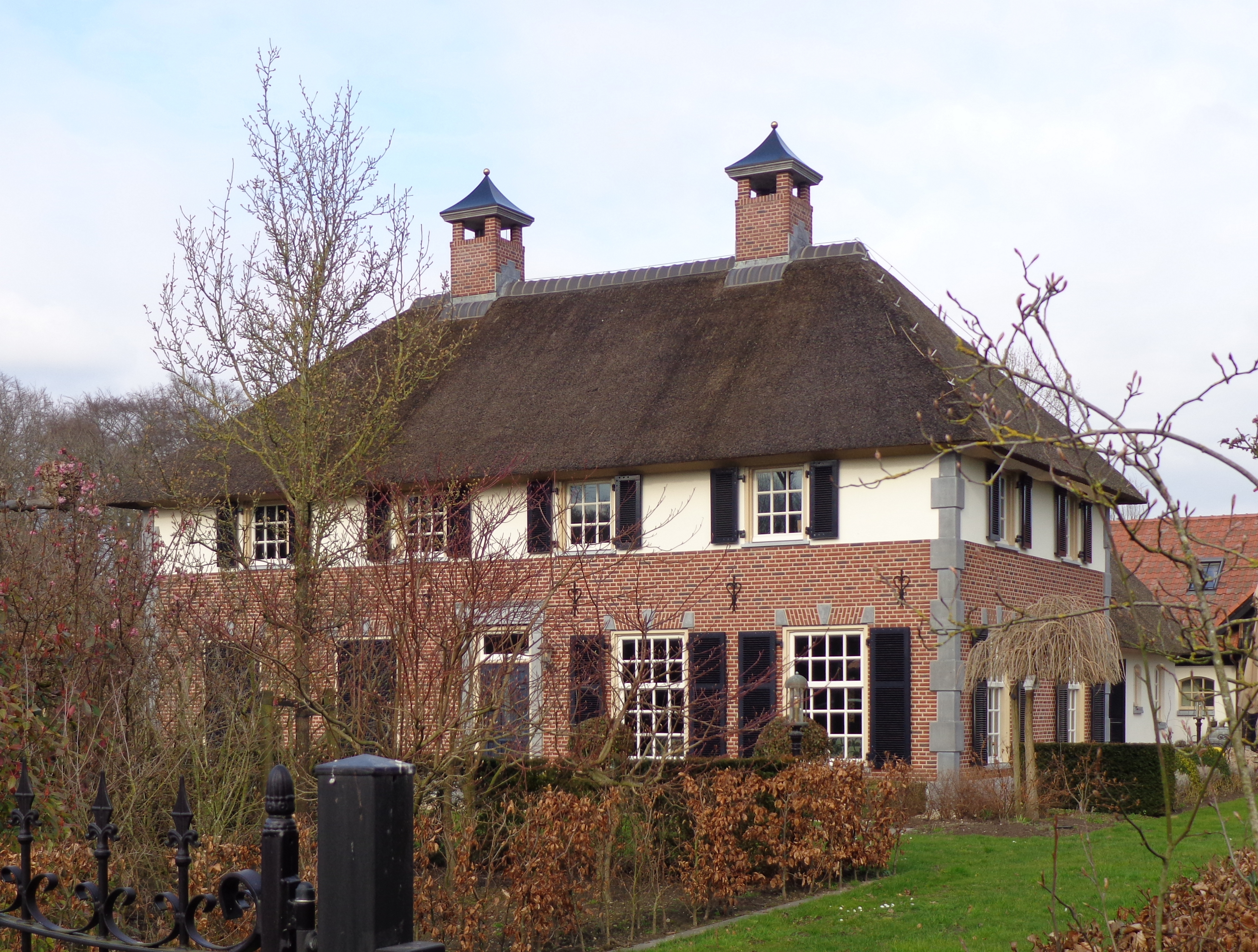
House in Neerijnen

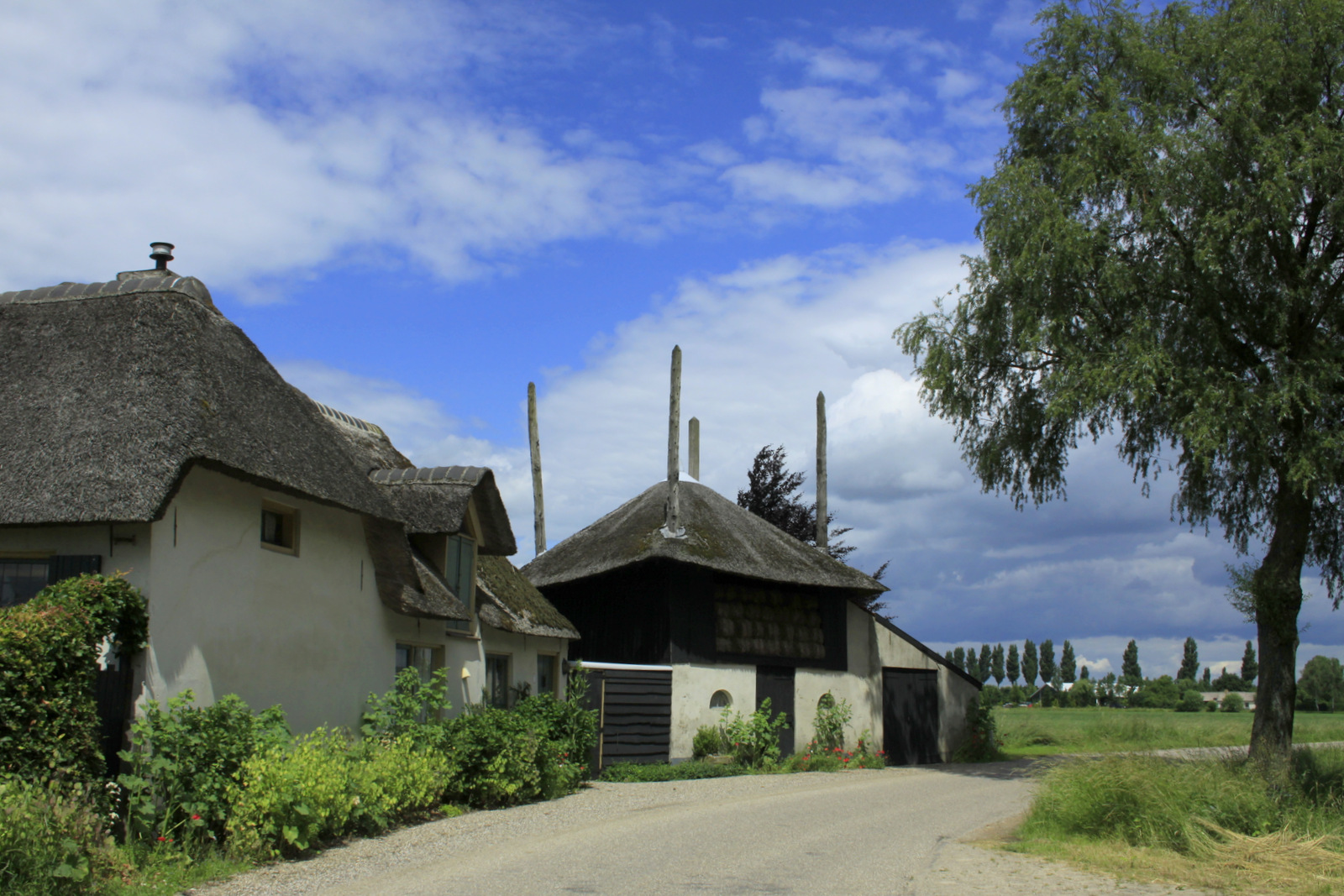
Farm with haystack

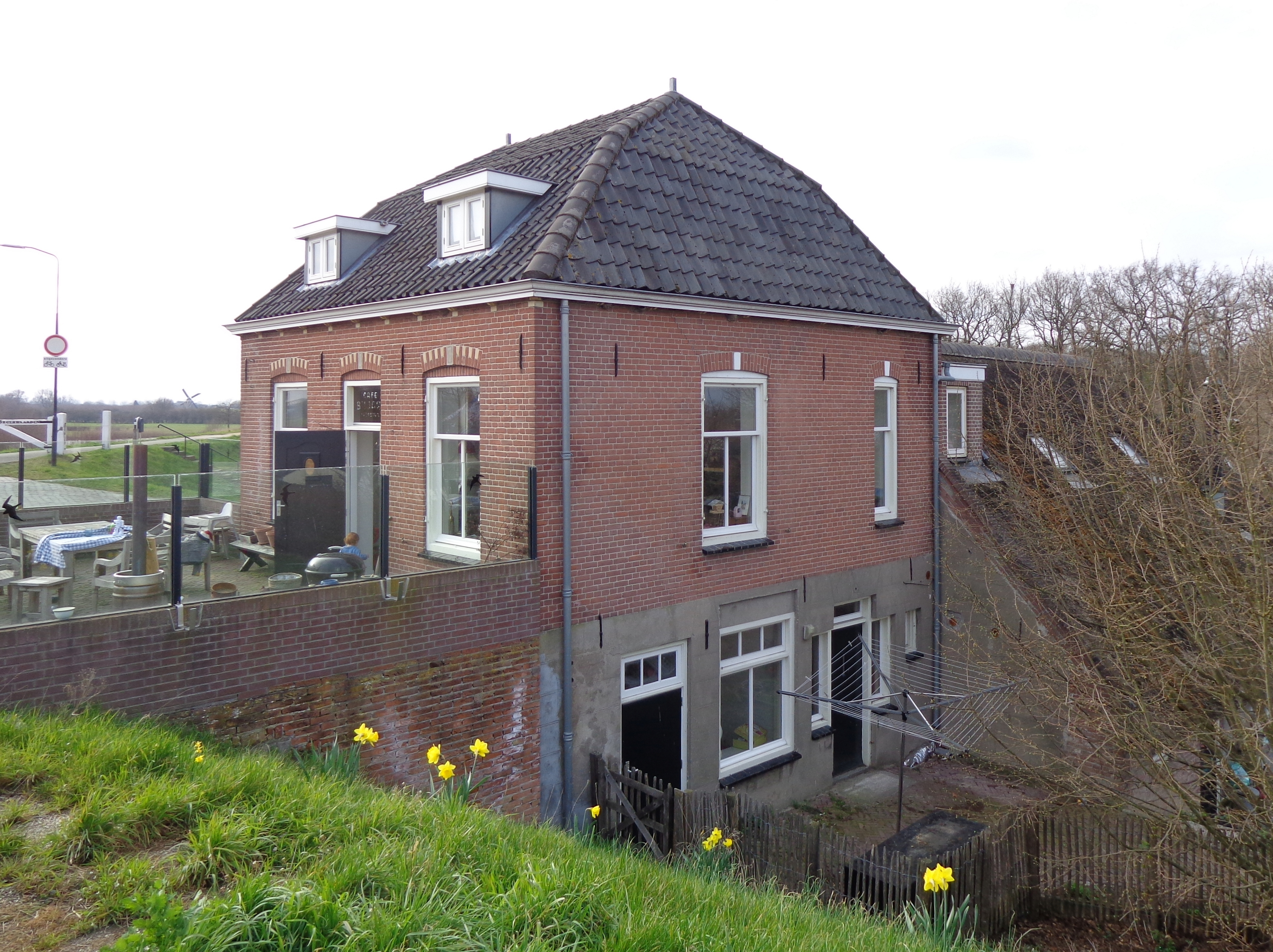
Restaurant on the dike
