= Georges Piot =

French rower (1896–1980)

Olympic medal record

Men's rowing
Silver medal – second place	1924 Paris	Coxless pair

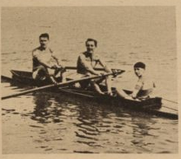
1923 06 21 MdS Demaré Piot Régates Argenteuil aviron

Georges Piot (14 September 1896 – 5 April 1980) was a French rower who competed in the 1924 Summer Olympics and in the 1928 Summer Olympics.

In 1924 he won the silver medal with his partner Maurice Monney-Bouton in the coxless pair event. Four years later he was part of the French boat which was eliminated in the second round of the coxed four competition.
