= Dokter Faust van Waardenburg =

Protagonist of Dutch folk tale

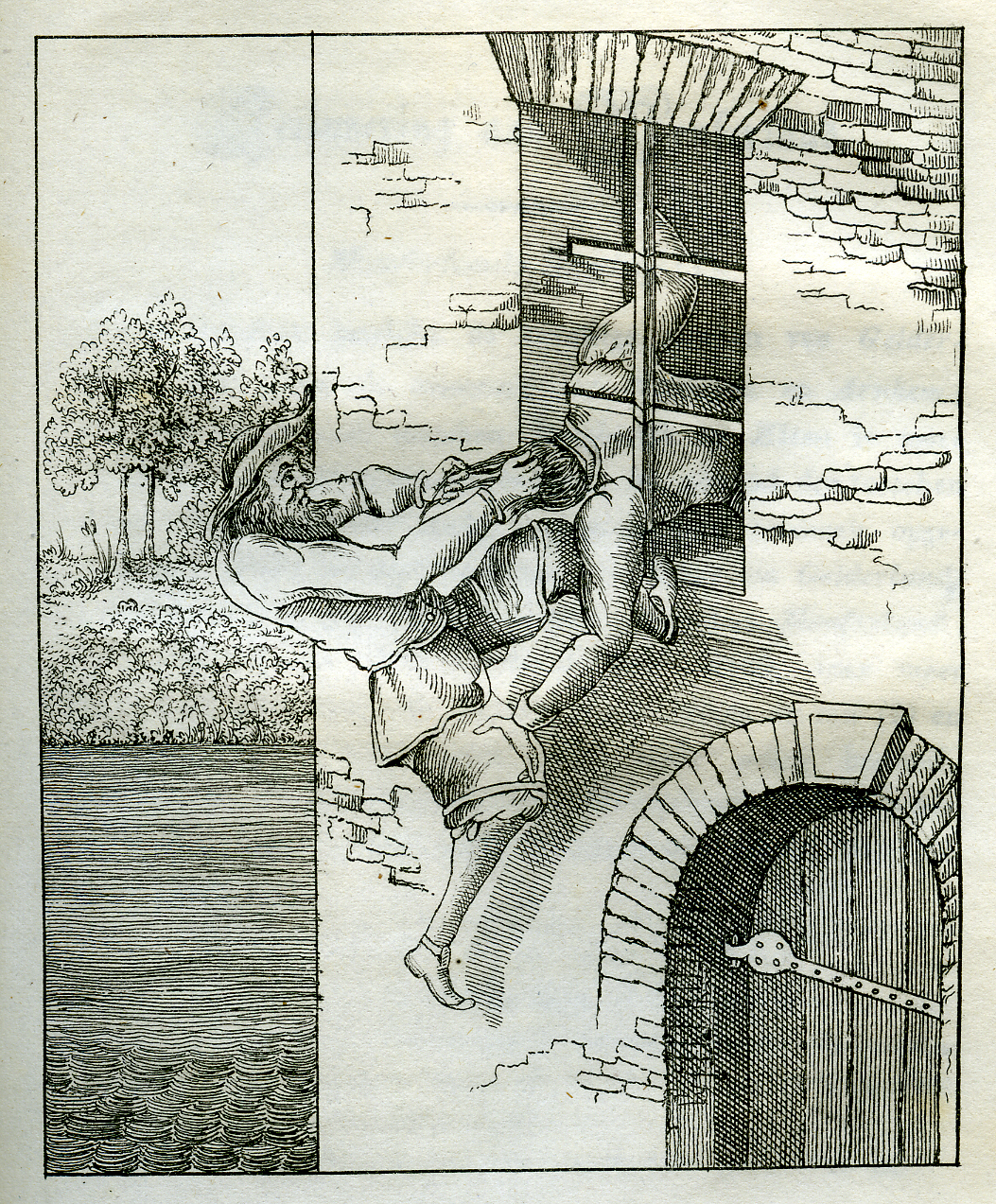
The devil pulls Faust out through the latticed window, illustration from the Gelderland Volksalmanak from 1842

Dokter Faust van Waardenburg is a protagonist from a folk tale that is famous in the Netherlands. It is a Dutch version of the German Faust tale.

The story is set partly in Waardenburg Castle. Marten Toonder was inspired by Faust history when in 1941 he had the evil wizard Hocus Pas live in the dragon castle, which later became Bommelstein. The name of the servant Joost appears to be derived from that of the devil, Joost is a nickname for the devil, remember the saying Joost mag het weten.
