= Van Est =

Van Est is a Dutch surname that may refer to:

- Bart van Est (born 1956), Dutch cyclist
- Nico van Est (1928–2009), Dutch cyclist
- Piet van Est (1934–1991), Dutch cyclist, brother of Nico and Wilm
- Wim van Est (1923–2003), Dutch cyclist, brother of Nico and Piet
- Willem Hessels van Est (1542–1613), Dutch Catholic commentator on the Pauline epistles
