= Electron spiral toroid =

Electron Power Systems, Inc. of Acton, Massachusetts, United States, claims to have developed a technology for maintaining small stable plasma toroids called electron spiral toroids (ESTs) which remain stable in Earth's atmosphere without the use of any special magnetic fields. They claim to have created these toroids in the laboratory, and to have developed a mathematical model for them that is similar to some explanations for ball lightning. An EST may be a special case of a spheromak.

Because of EST's claimed lack of need for an external stabilizing magnetic field, EPS hope to be able to create small efficient fusion reactors by colliding magnetically accelerated ESTs together at speeds high enough to induce ballistic nuclear fusion.

Their model for their reported toroidal phenomena was extensively criticised by a December 2000 technical report commissioned by NASA. As of 2004, EPS claim to have met the criticisms of the NASA report, and to have demonstrated that their model is mathematically sound, and state that they are ready to proceed with development of their technology.
