= Nederland's Adelsboek =

Genealogical record of Dutch noble families

Nederland’s Adelsboek (lit. 'Dutch Noble Book'), informally known as the Red Book (Dutch: Het Rode Boekje), is a book series published annually since 1903, containing the genealogies of Dutch noble families. It is issued by the Centraal Bureau voor Genealogie in The Hague.

== See also ==
- List of Dutch noble families
