= CBG Centrum voor familiegeschiedenis =

Dutch research center for genealogical and heraldic studies

Logo of CBG Centrum voor familiegeschiedenis

The CBG Centrum voor familiegeschiedenis, formerly known as the Centraal Bureau voor Genealogie (CBG), is the Dutch research centre for genealogical and heraldic studies. It is a non-profit foundation that was founded on May 15, 1945, with the aim of bringing together a number of archive collections and making research of genealogy and related studies easier. The centre is located at the Prins Willem Alexanderhof in The Hague together with the National Archive.

The CBG publishes many books pertaining to genealogy, for instance the Nederland's Adelsboek and the Nederland's Patriciaat.
