= Waardenburg =

- Village
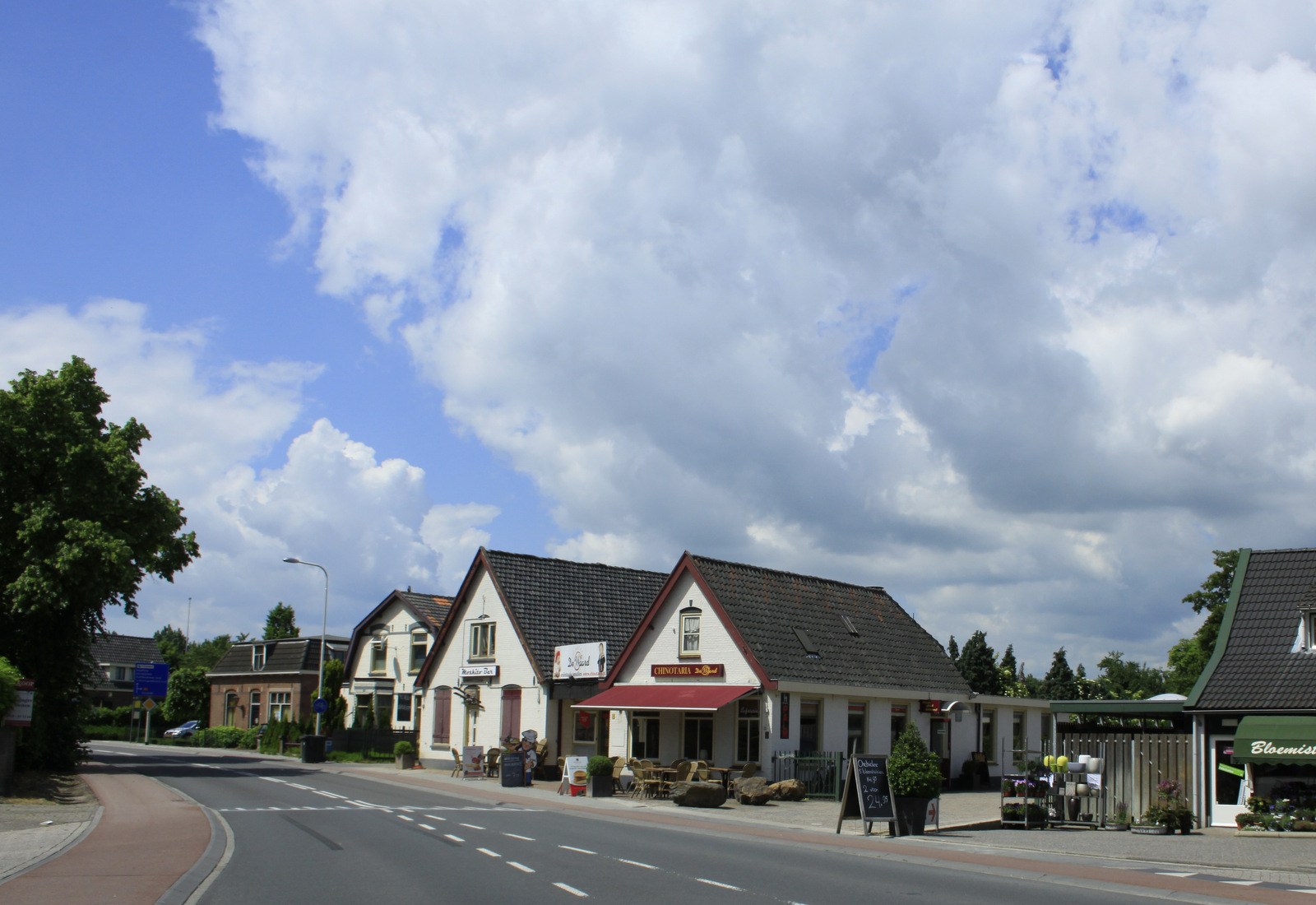
- Centre of Waardenburg

- Coat of arms

- Location in the Netherlands Waardenburg (Netherlands)
- Coordinates: 51°49′56″N 5°15′21″E
- Country: Netherlands
- Province: Gelderland
- Municipality: West Betuwe

Area
  - Total: 12.10 km^{2} (4.67 sq mi)
- Elevation: 4 m (13 ft)

Population (2021)
  - Total: 2,230
  - Density: 184/km^{2} (477/sq mi)
- Time zone: UTC+1 (CET)
  - Summer (DST): UTC+2 (CEST)
- Postal code: 4181
- Dialing code: 0418

Waardenburg is a village in the Dutch province of Gelderland. It is a part of the municipality of West Betuwe, and is located about 13 km west of Tiel.

Waardenburg was a separate municipality until 1978, when it was merged with Neerijnen.

== History ==
It was first mentioned in 1108 as Werden, and means "fortified place near water". Waardenburg developed as an esdorp perpendicular to the dike of the Waal. Waardenburg Castle was founded in 1265 as a wooden fortification. It developed into a castle with three towers, a ring wall and a gate. In 1574, it was taken by William the Silent causing the destruction of the west and south side. In 1703, the ruins were cleared.

In 1840, Waardenburg was home to 675 people. In 1868, the village was cut in two by the railway line. A train station opened in Waardenburg, but closed in 1935. In 1932, the main road Den Bosch-Utrecht (nowadays: A2 motorway) further divided the village.

Waardenburg has two windmills. The Poldermolen is a windpump built in 1867 which still serves a modest function to drain a 120 hectares (300 acres) nature area. De Zeskante Molen is a grist mill from the 18th century. Between 1914 and 1918, it was used to generate electricity. In 1995, the dike was enlarged and the windmill was raised 1.5 metres.

== Gallery ==
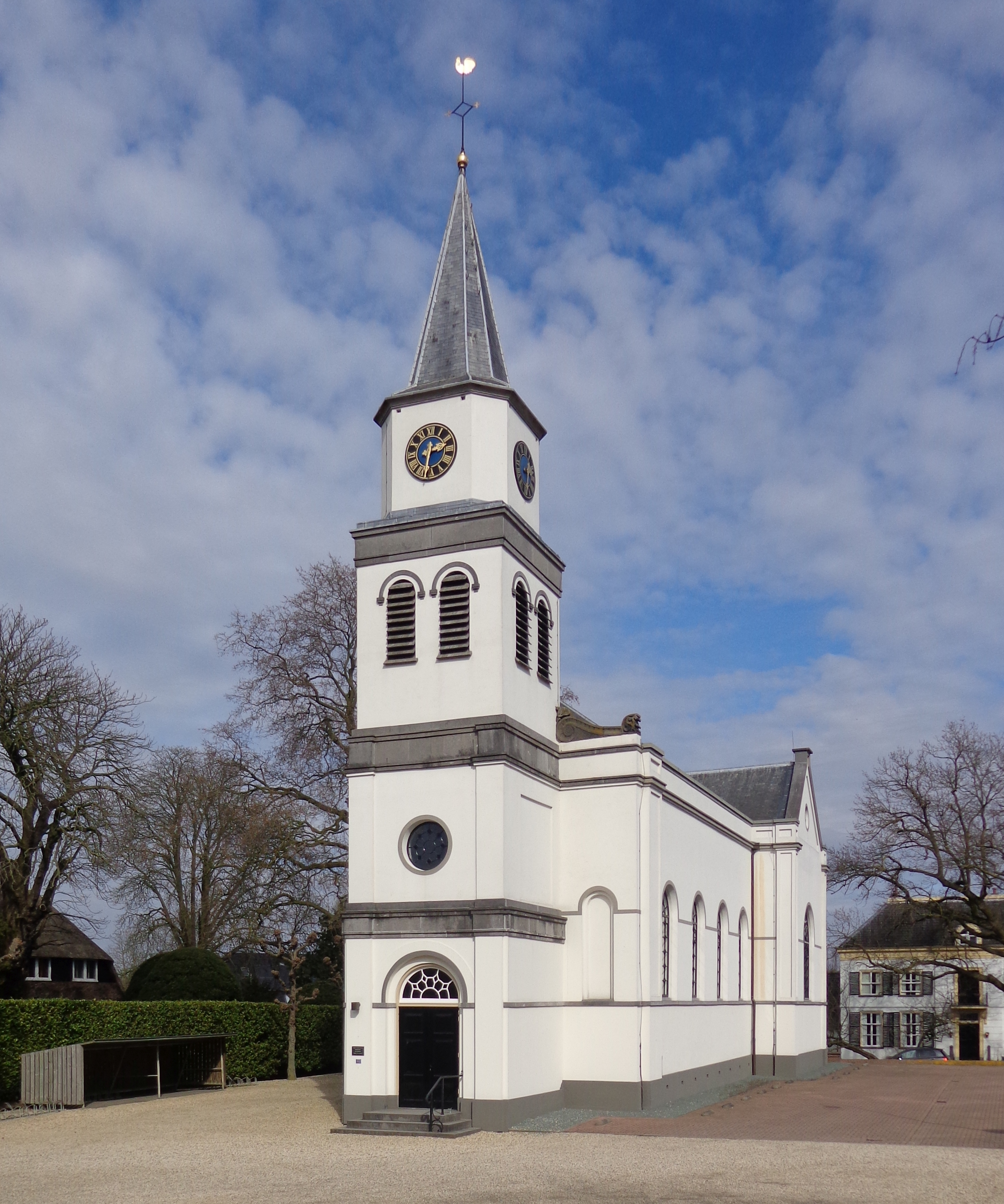
Dutch Reformed Church

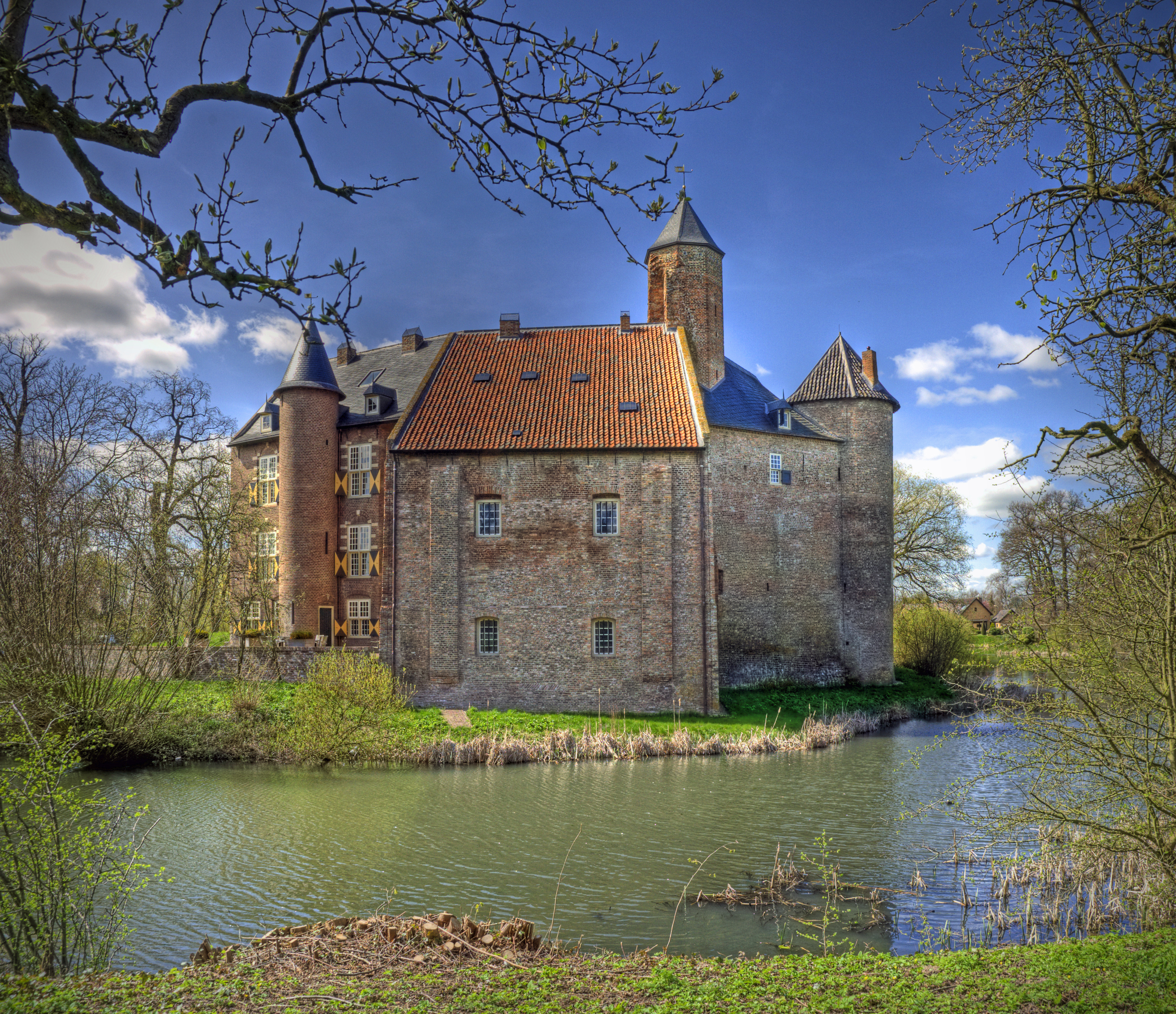
Waardenburg Castle

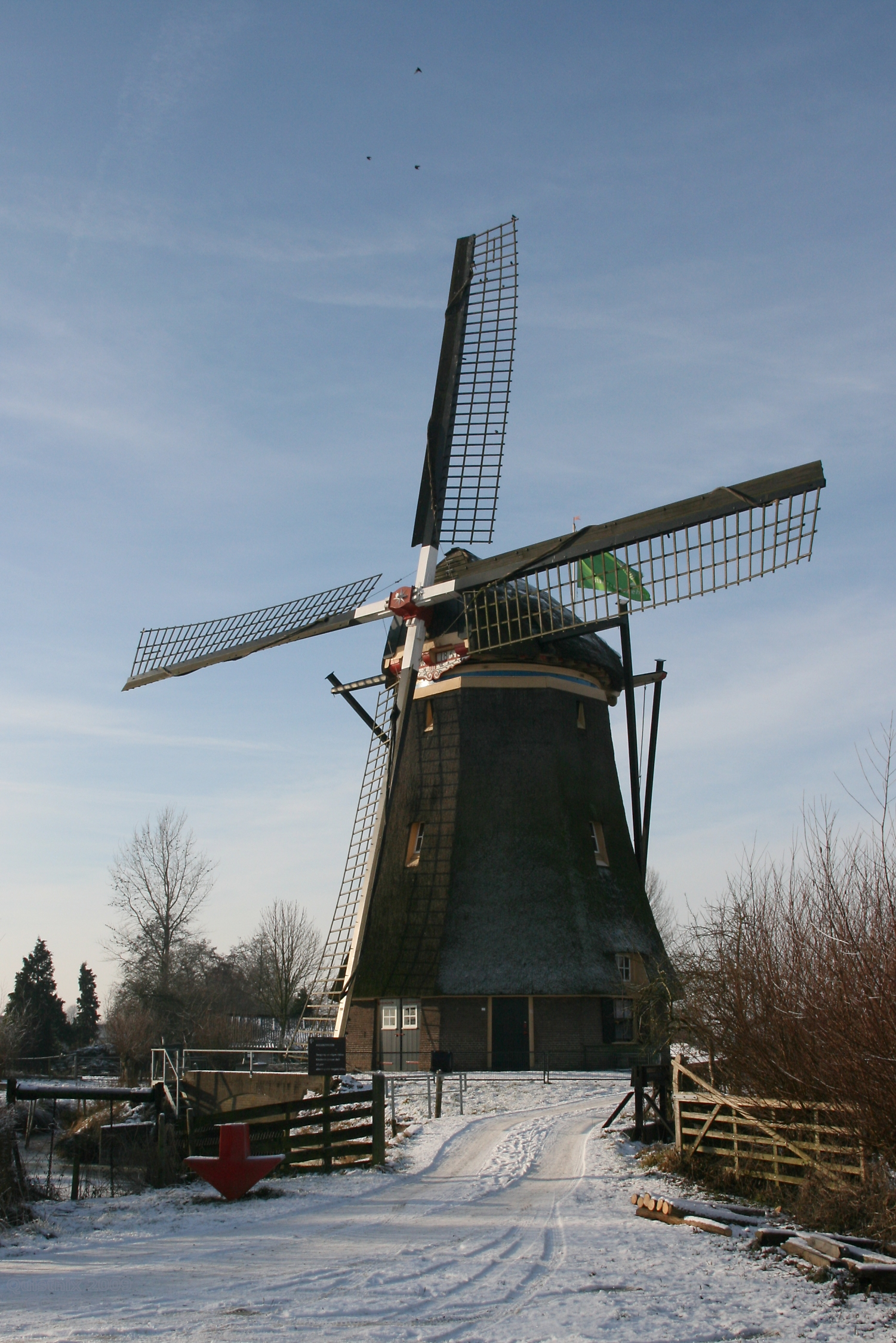
Polder mill

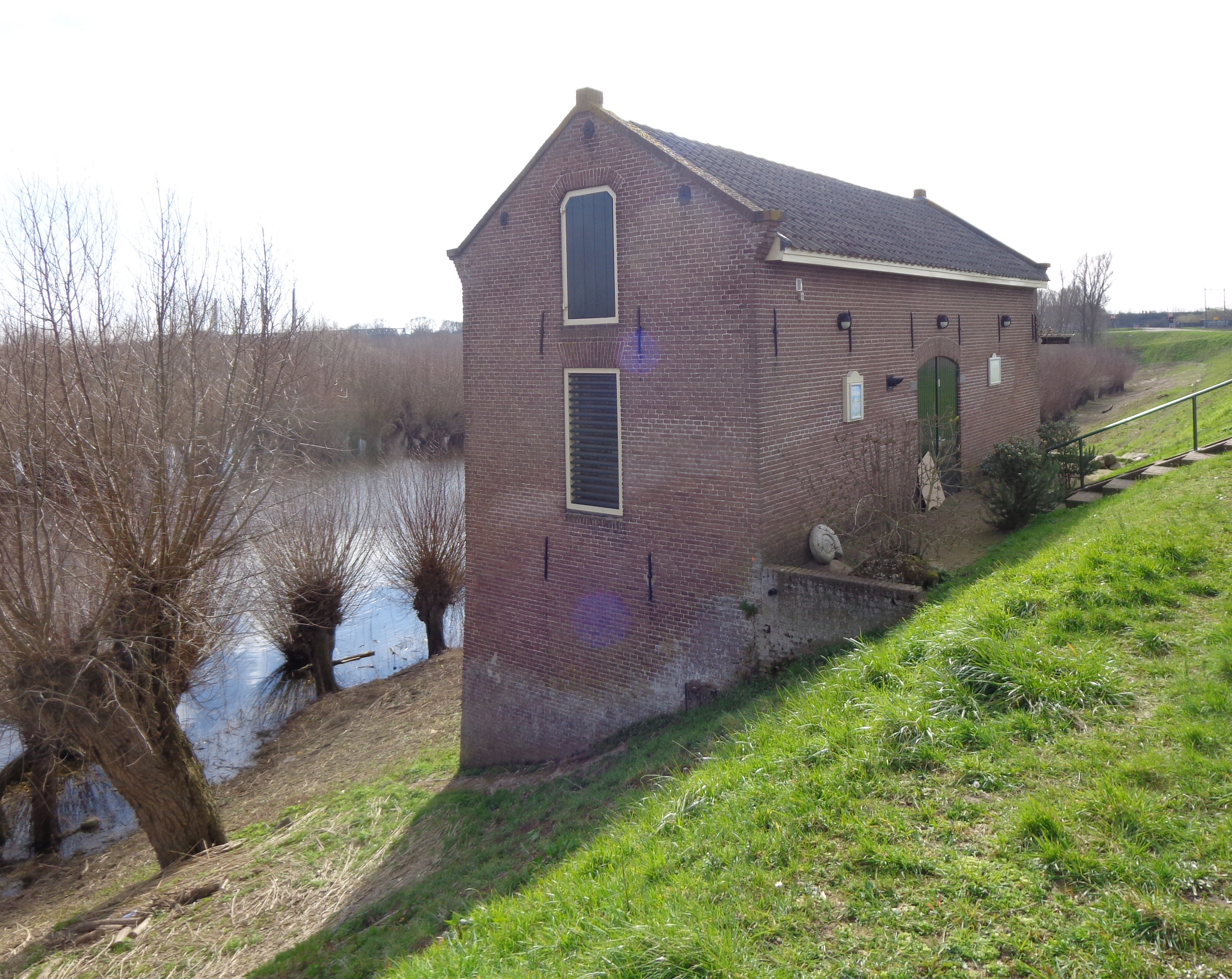
Dike armory
