= Opijnen =

- Village
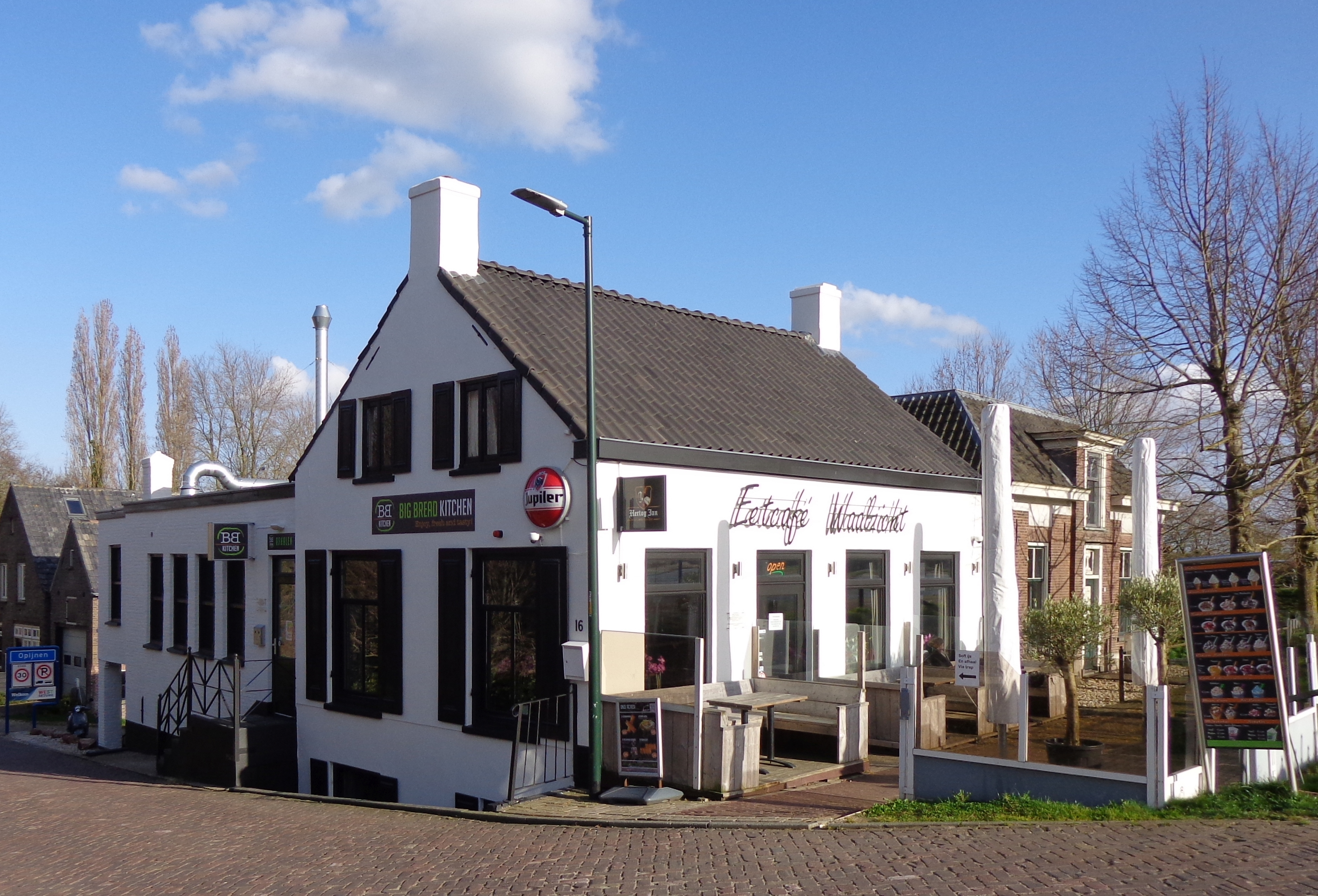
- Pub in Opijnen

- Location in the Netherlands Opijnen (Netherlands)
- Coordinates: 51°49′40″N 5°17′54″E
- Country: Netherlands
- Province: Gelderland
- Municipality: West Betuwe

Area
  - Total: 3.68 km^{2} (1.42 sq mi)
- Elevation: 4 m (13 ft)

Population (2021)
  - Total: 1,195
  - Density: 325/km^{2} (841/sq mi)
- Time zone: UTC+1 (CET)
  - Summer (DST): UTC+2 (CEST)
- Postal code: 4184
- Dialing code: 0418

Opijnen is a village in the Dutch province of Gelderland. It is a part of the municipality of West Betuwe, and lies about 10 km southwest of Tiel.

Opijnen was a separate municipality until 1818, when it changed its name to Est en Opijnen.

== History ==
It was first mentioned in 1265 as Opynen, and means upstream as compared to Neerijnen. The village developed parallel to the Waal as a stretched out esdorp. In 1265, Opijnen became the property of Raoul de Châtillon, a French nobleman who had fled to Gelre after a dispute with the King of France. A castle was built near the village, however it disappeared in the 16th century. The Dutch Reformed Church was built in 1860 and the tower dates from 1925. In 1840, Opijnen was home to 333 people.

Opijnen is home to the graves of eight American airmen who were shot down on 30 July 1943, and killed while returning to England from a bombing raid over Kassel, Germany. The village honoured the airmen by burying them in their cemetery. From that time and for seventy-five years afterwards, the village honoured these men annually with a formal church service and then a laying of flowers on the graves. In 2006, the village opened a housing complex with eighty-six units. The airmen were further honoured by having the streets in that housing complex named after them.

== Gallery ==
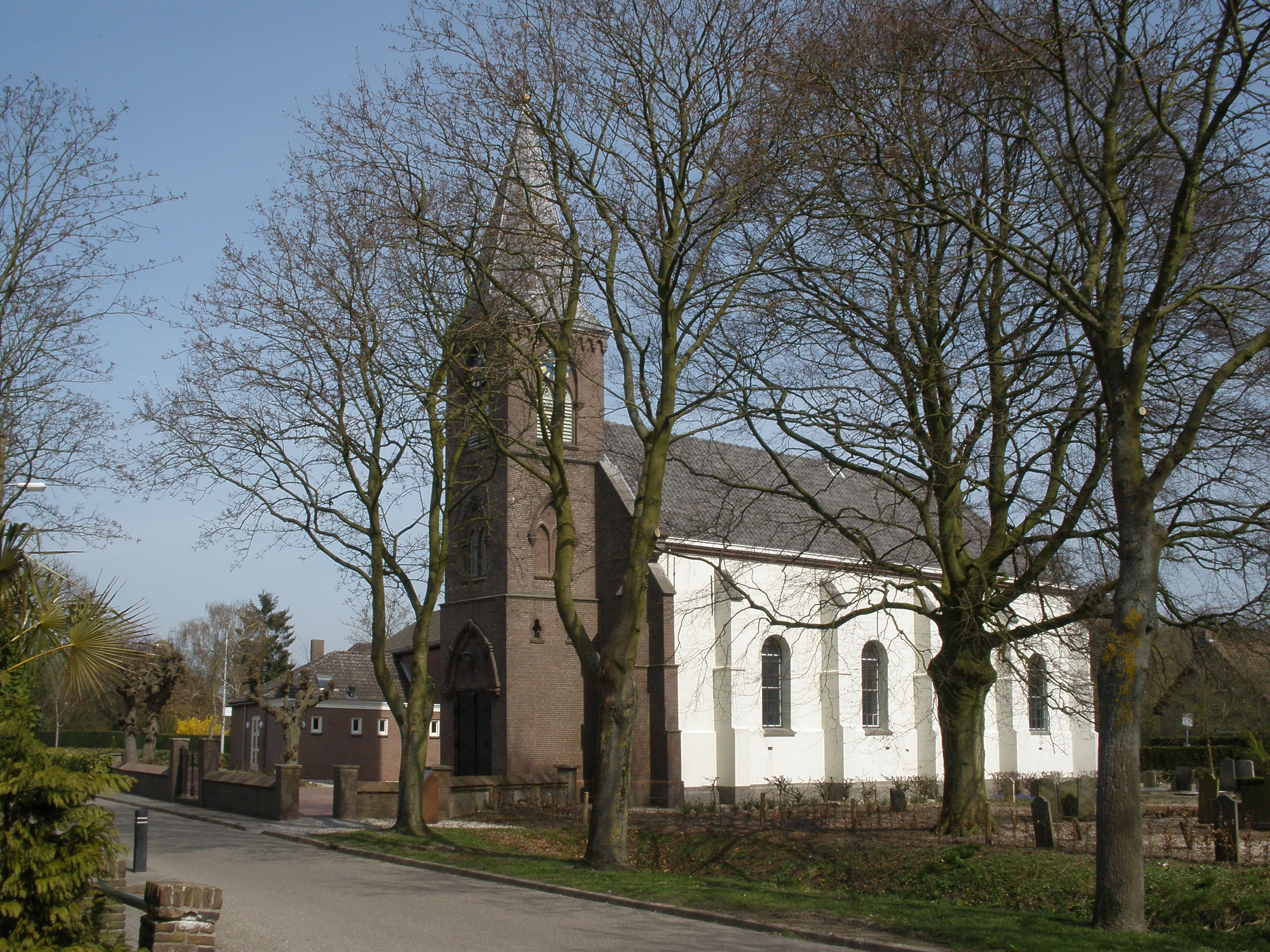
Dutch Reformed Church

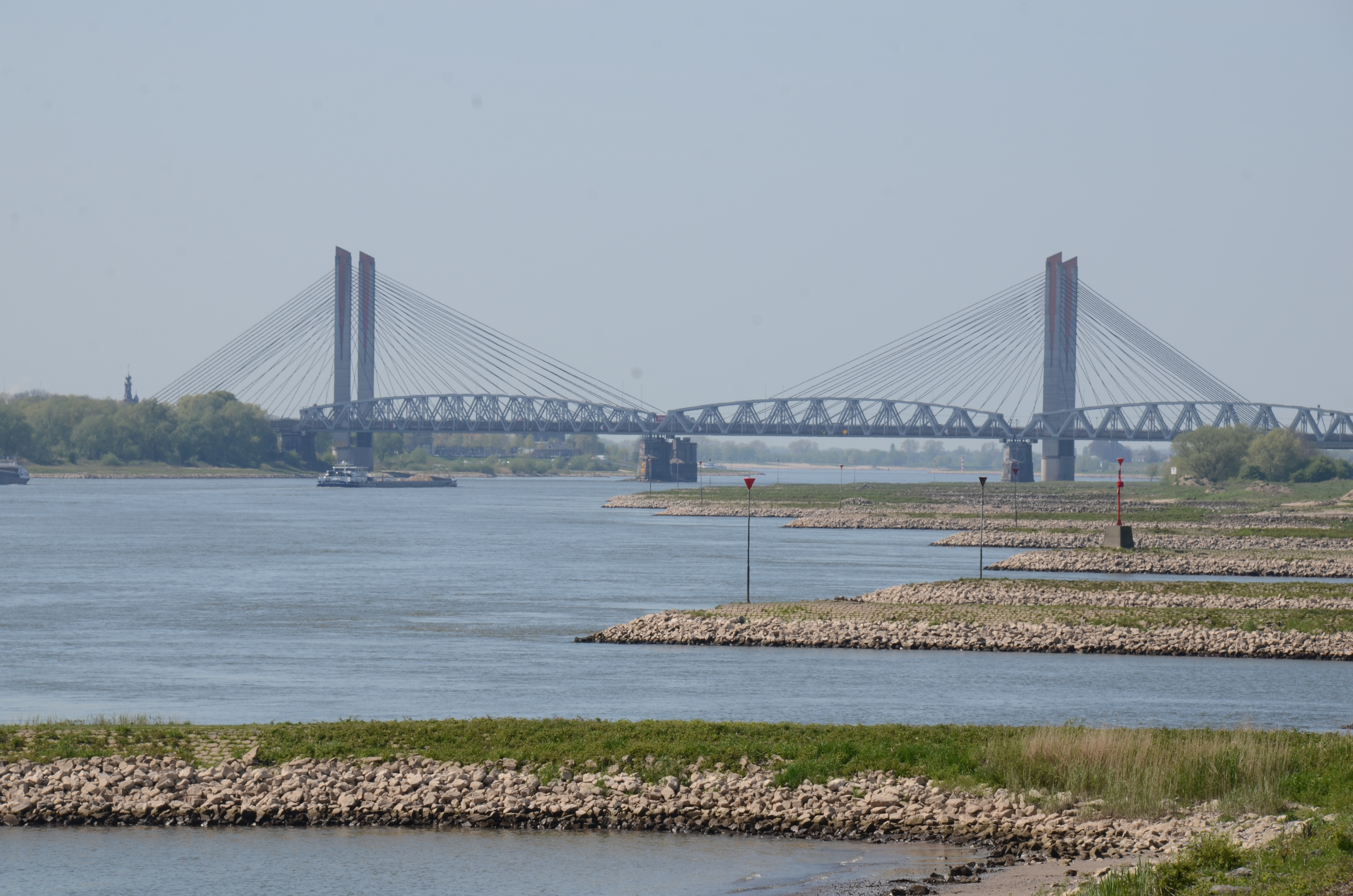
Bridges over the Waal

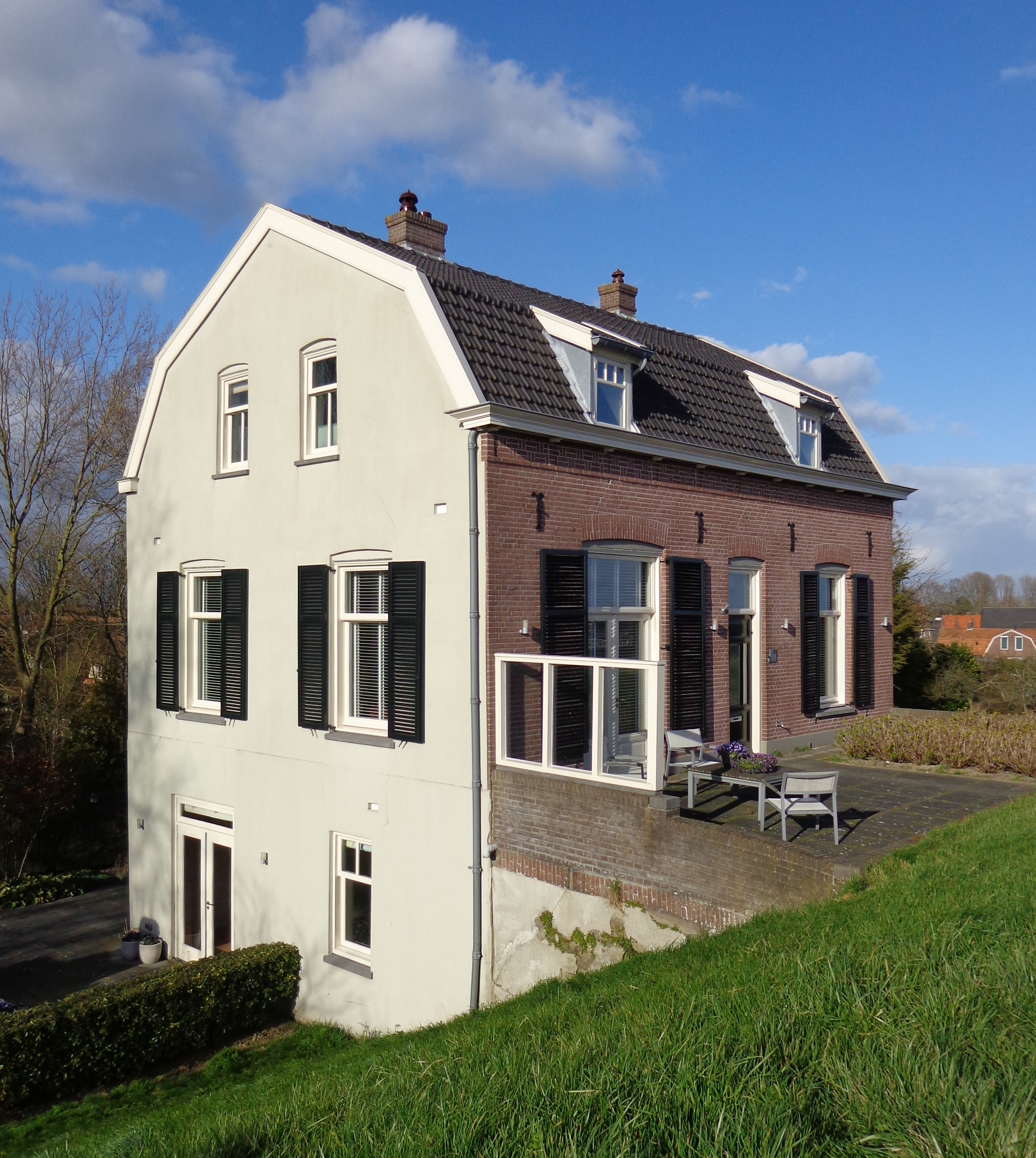
Dike house

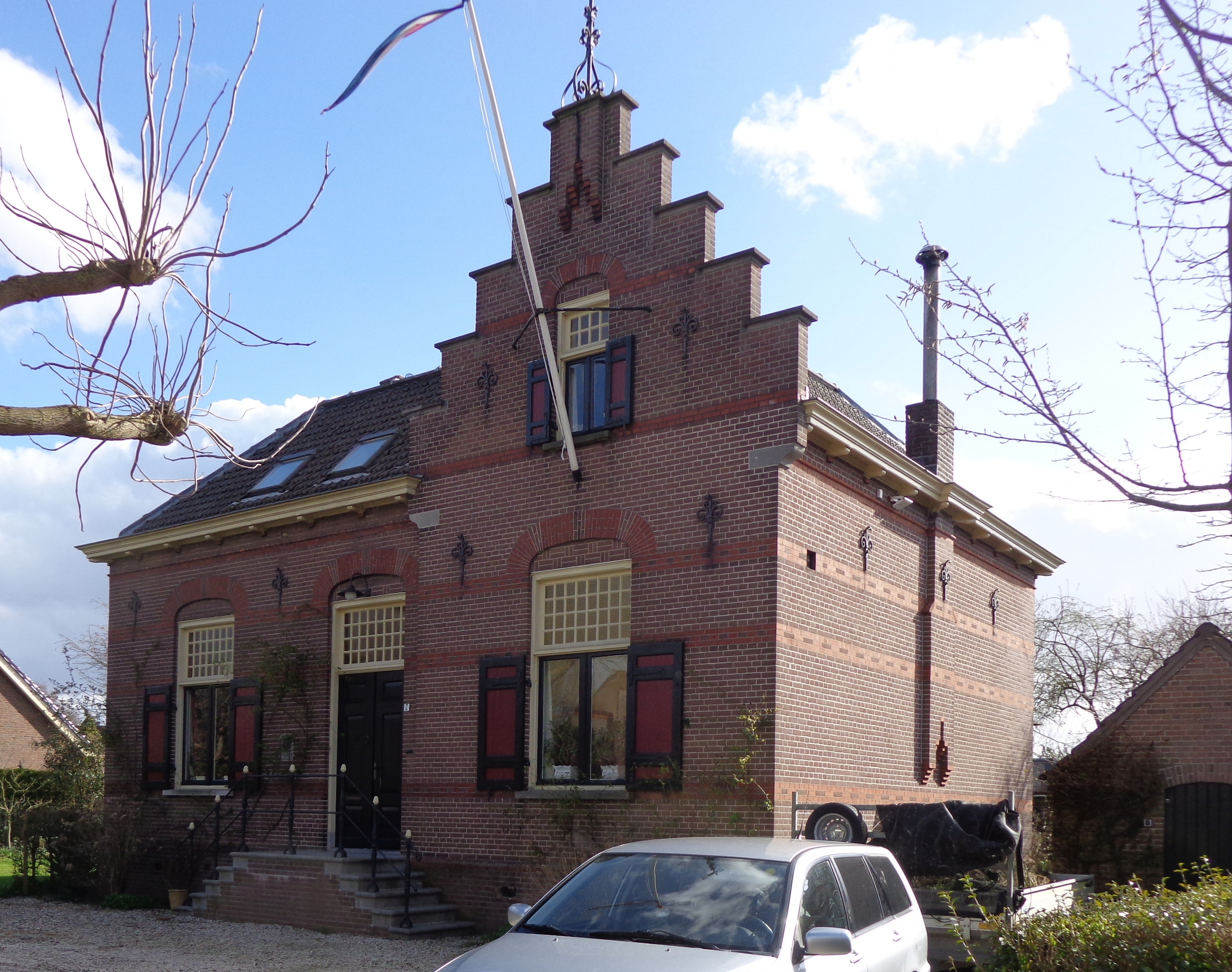
House in Opijnen
