= Beusichem =

- Village
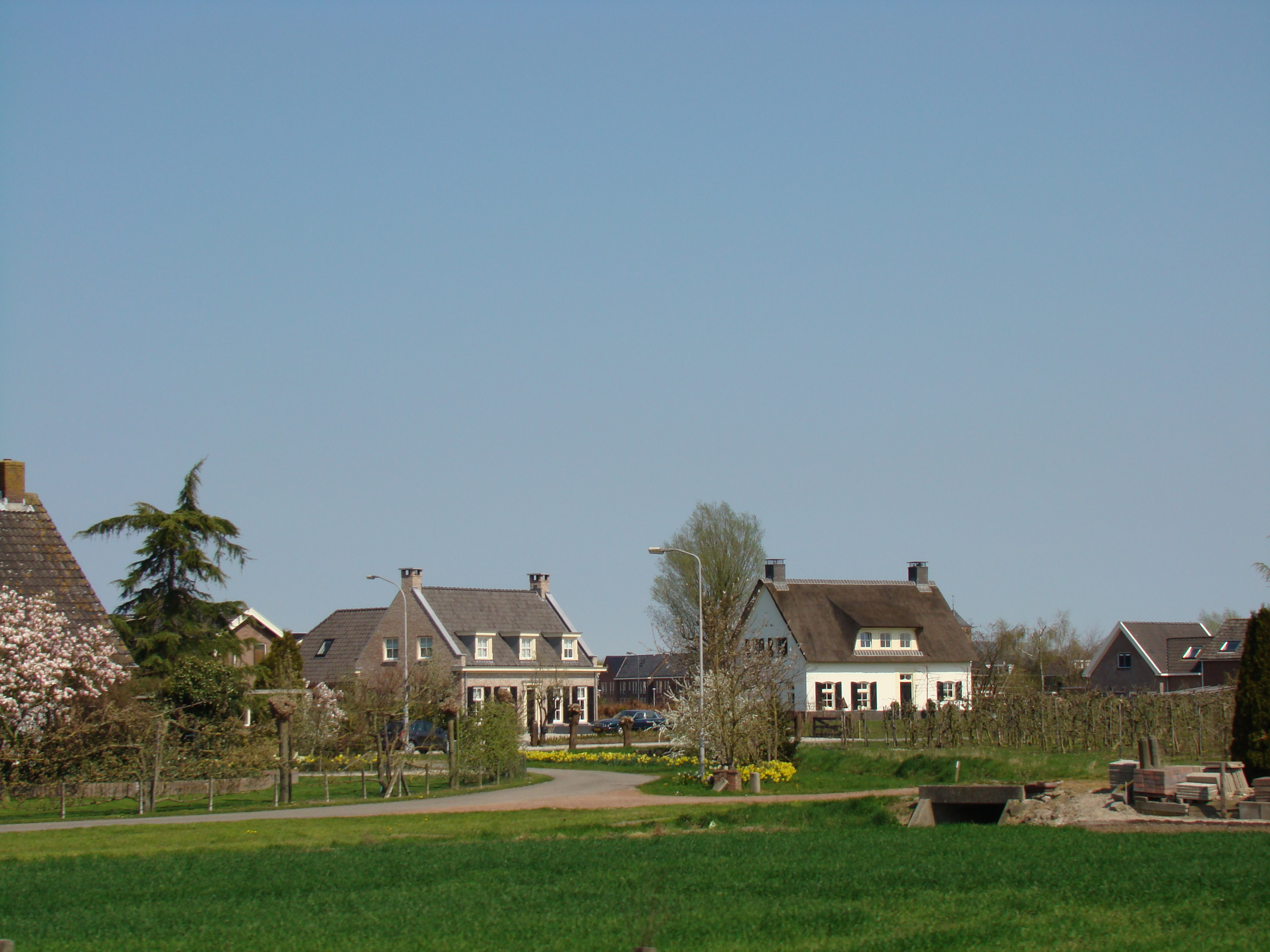

- Flag Coat of arms

- Location in the province of Gelderland Beusichem (Netherlands)
- Coordinates: 51°57′N 5°17′E
- Country: Netherlands
- Province: Gelderland
- Municipality: Buren

Area
  - Total: 12.30 km^{2} (4.75 sq mi)
- Elevation: 4 m (13 ft)

Population (2021)
  - Total: 3,935
  - Density: 319.9/km^{2} (828.6/sq mi)
- Time zone: UTC+1 (CET)
  - Summer (DST): UTC+2 (CEST)
- Postal code: 4111 & 4112
- Dialing code: 0345

Beusichem is a village in the Dutch province of Gelderland. It is a part of the municipality of Buren, and lies about 11 kilometres (7 mi) northwest of Tiel.

== History ==
It was first mentioned between 918 and 948 Buosinhem, and means "settlement of the people of Boso (person)". Beusichem started as a settlement near the Lek River and developed into a stretched out esdorp. The tower of the Dutch Reformed Church contains 12th-century elements. The church was restored in 1995–1996. In 1840, it was home to 1,004 people.

Beusichem is historically known for a famous horse market held every summer. It is said that even Napoleon bought his horses on the Beusichem horse market. Horse keepers from Russia, France, Germany and Switzerland came to Beusichem to trade horses. The horsemarket is mentioned in old documents for the first time in 1461.

Until 1977, Beusichem was a separate municipality.

== Gallery ==
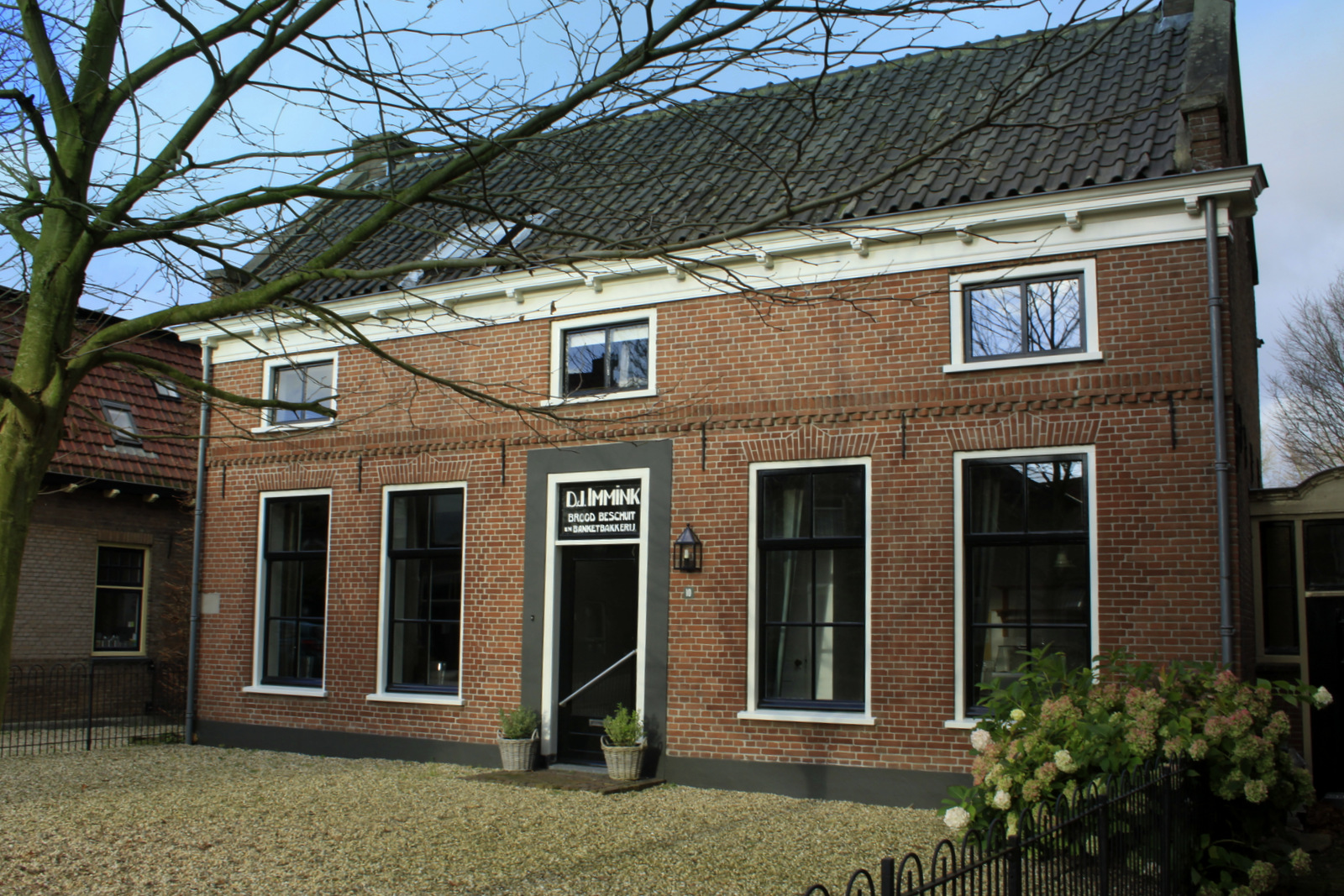
Former bakery

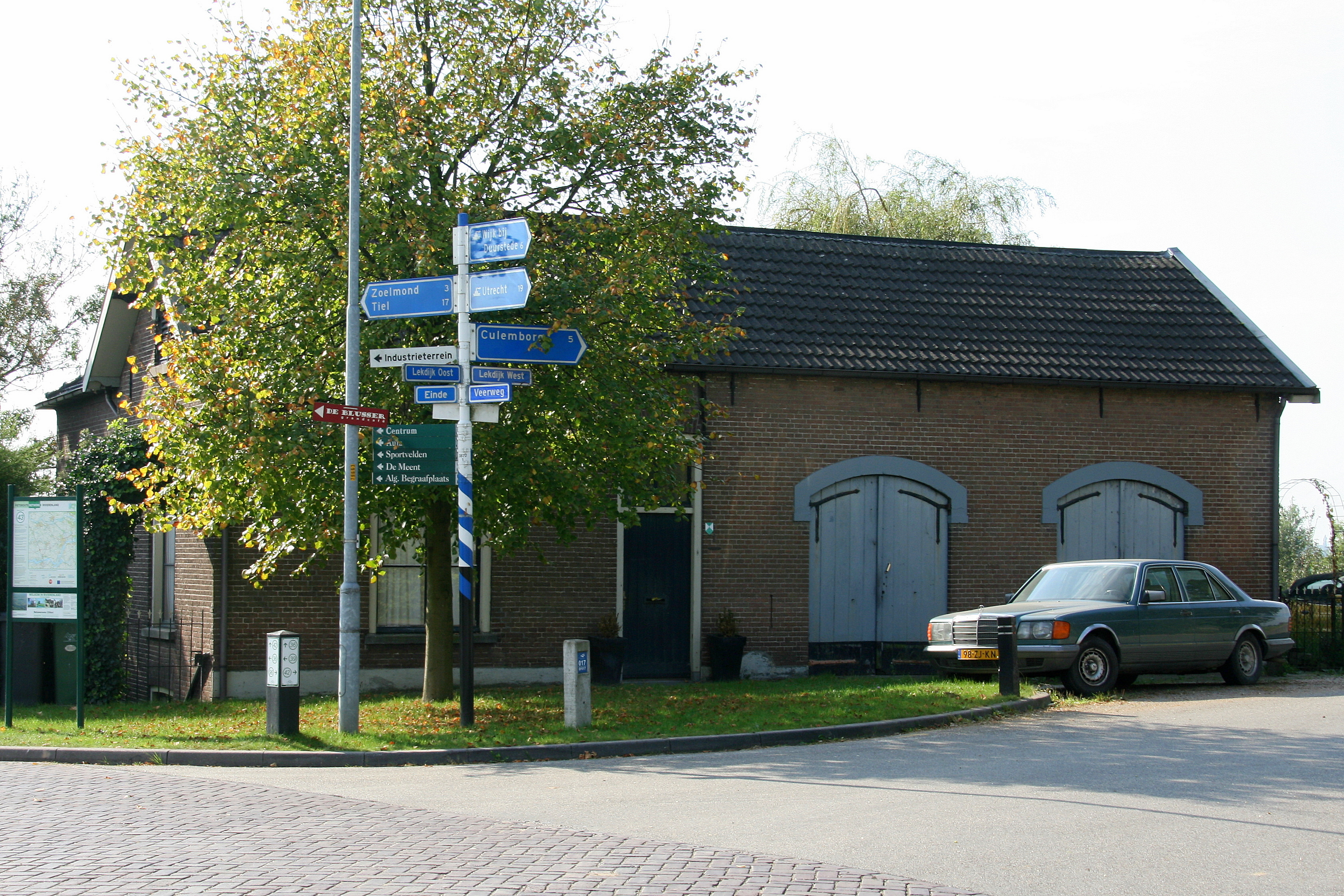
Dike warehouse

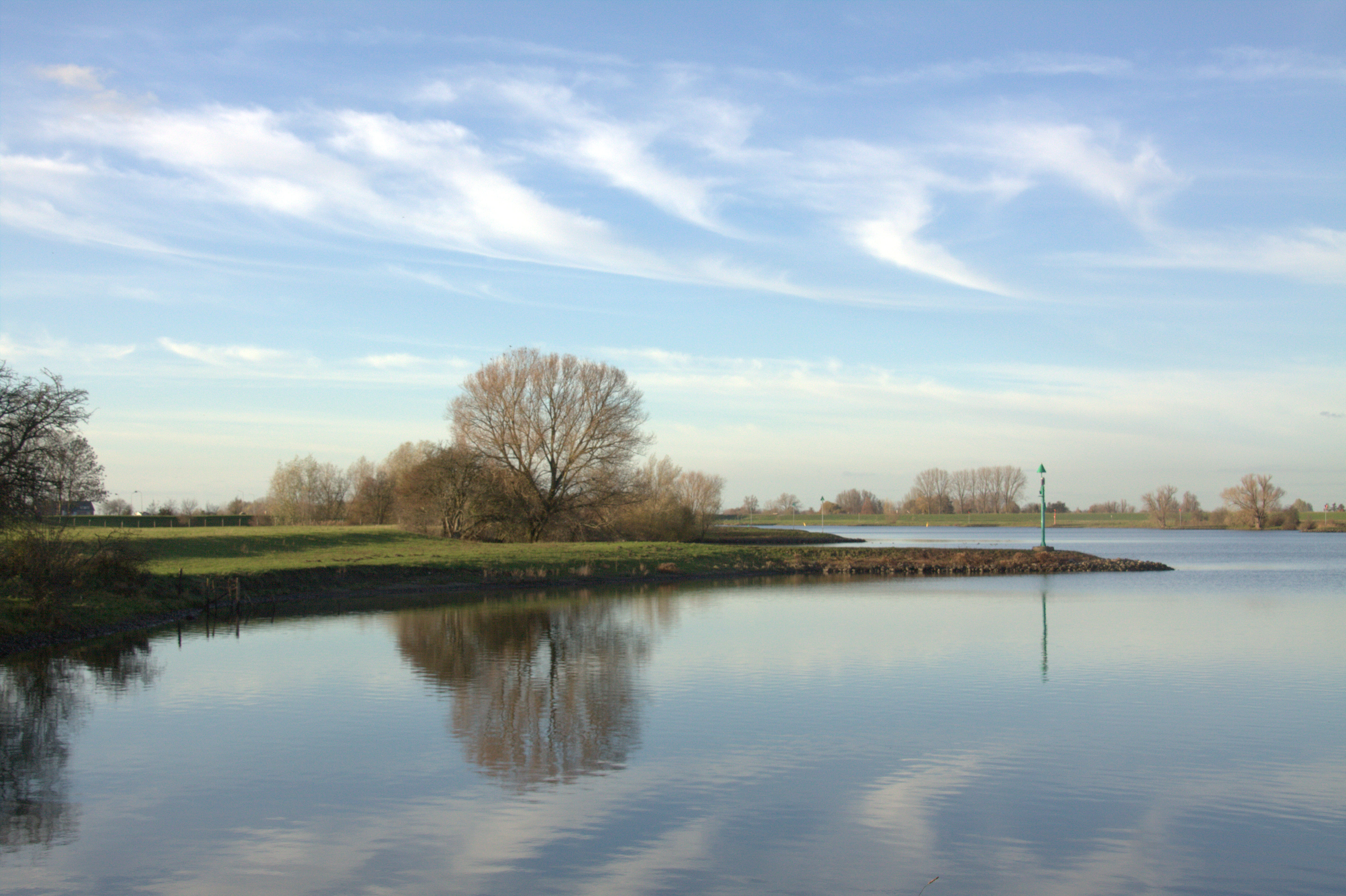
Lek River near Beusichem

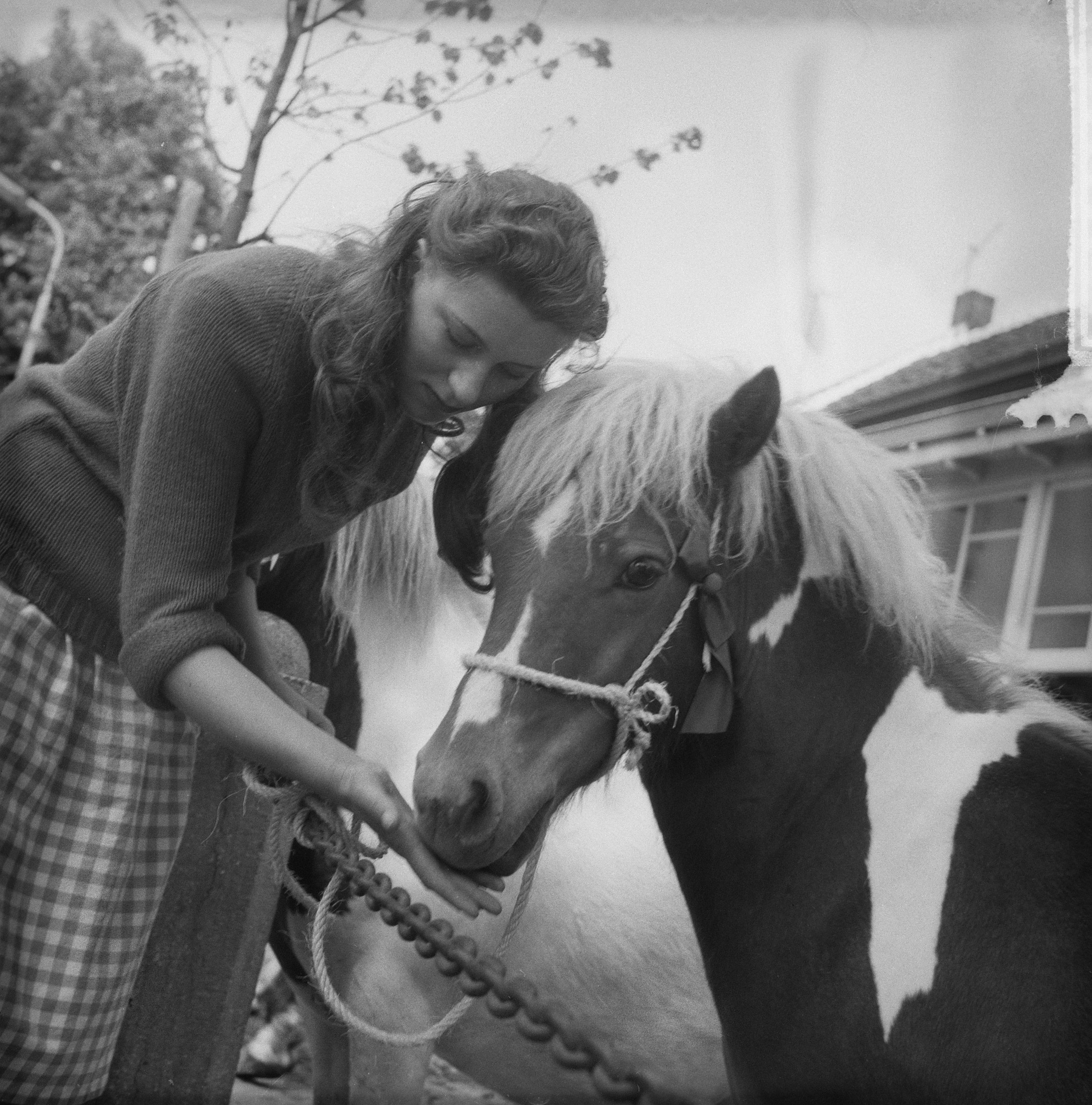
Horse market (1961)
