= Est, Netherlands =

Est
- Village
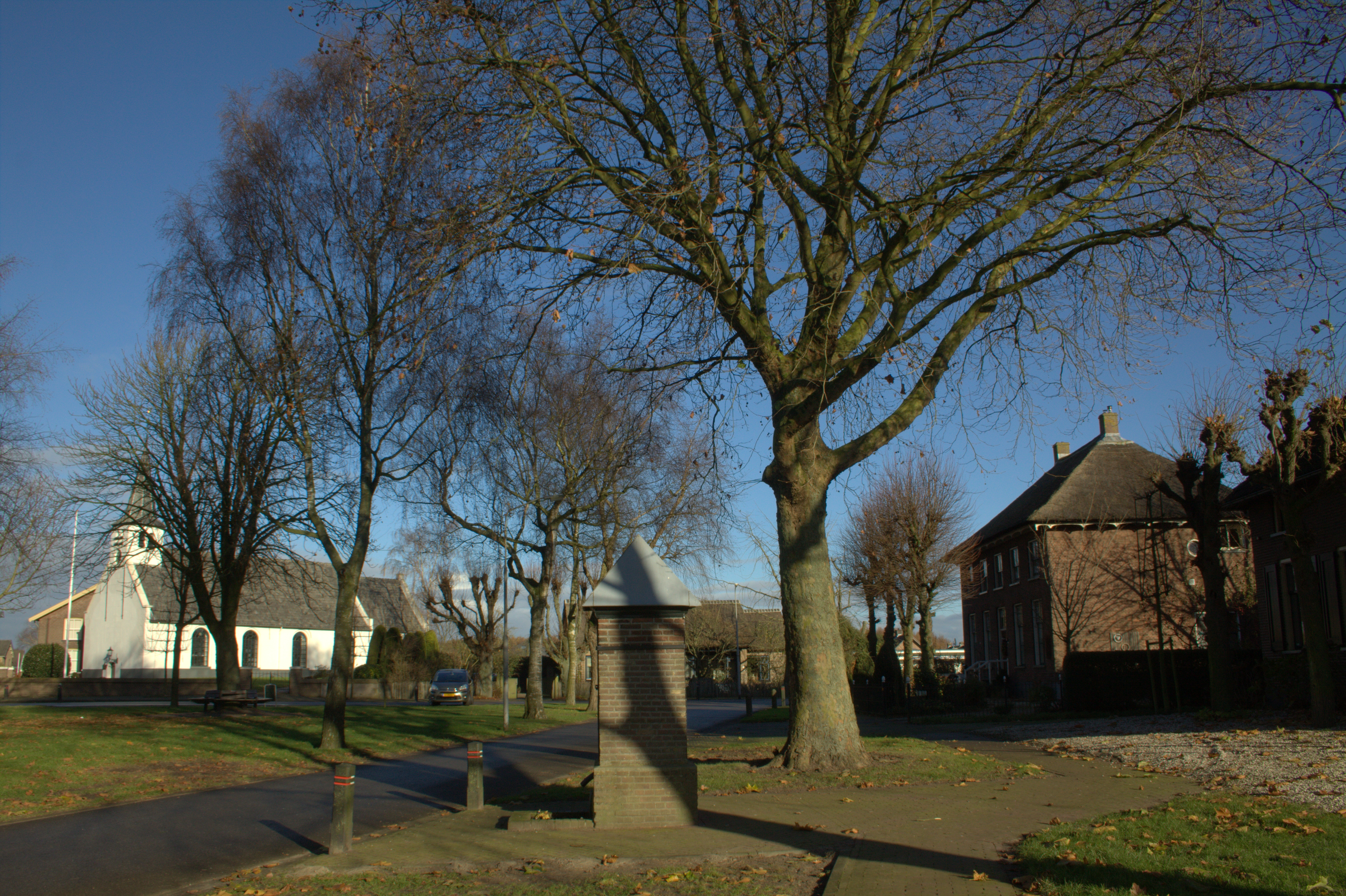
- Village square

- Location in the Netherlands Est (Netherlands)
- Coordinates: 51°51′9″N 5°18′49″E
- Country: Netherlands
- Province: Gelderland
- Municipality: West Betuwe

Area
  - Total: 3.54 km^{2} (1.37 sq mi)
- Elevation: 4 m (13 ft)

Population (2021)
  - Total: 575
  - Density: 162/km^{2} (421/sq mi)
- Time zone: UTC+1 (CET)
  - Summer (DST): UTC+2 (CEST)
- Postal code: 4185
- Dialing code: 0345

Est is a village in the Dutch province of Gelderland. It is a part of the municipality of West Betuwe, and lies about 8 km west of Tiel.

It was first mentioned in 1316 as Est. The etymology is unclear. The church dates from 1750 and has been restored in 1999. The village pump dates from around 1770, and is still in working order. In 1840, Est was home to 588 people.
