= Geldermalsen =

- Former municipality, town
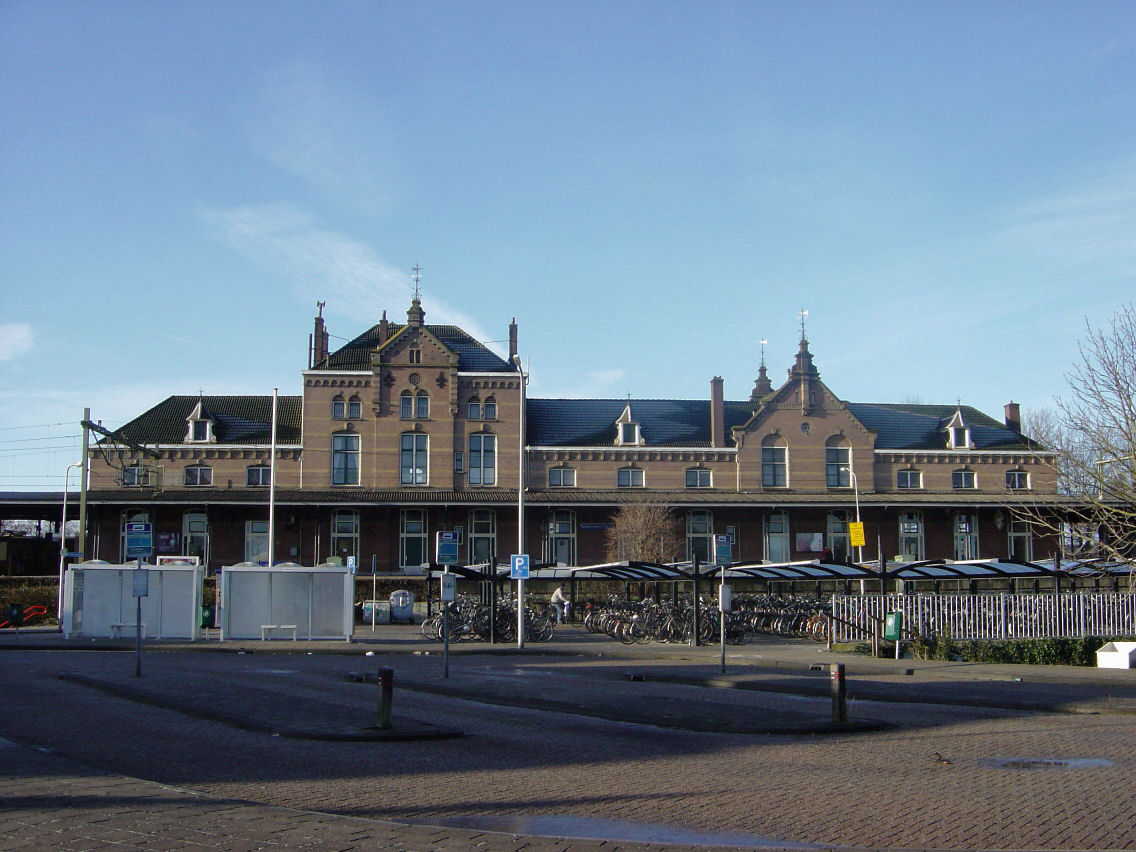
- Geldermalsen railway station

- Flag Coat of arms

- Location in the province of Gelderland Location in the Netherlands
- Coordinates: 51°53′N 5°17′E
- Country: Netherlands
- Province: Gelderland
- Municipality: West Betuwe
- Merged: 2019

Area
  - Total: 11.91 km^{2} (4.60 sq mi)
- Elevation: 4 m (13 ft)

Population (2021)
  - Total: 10,860
  - Density: 911.8/km^{2} (2,362/sq mi)
- Time zone: UTC+1 (CET)
  - Summer (DST): UTC+2 (CEST)
- Postcode: 4191
- Area code: 0345
- Website: www.geldermalsen.nl

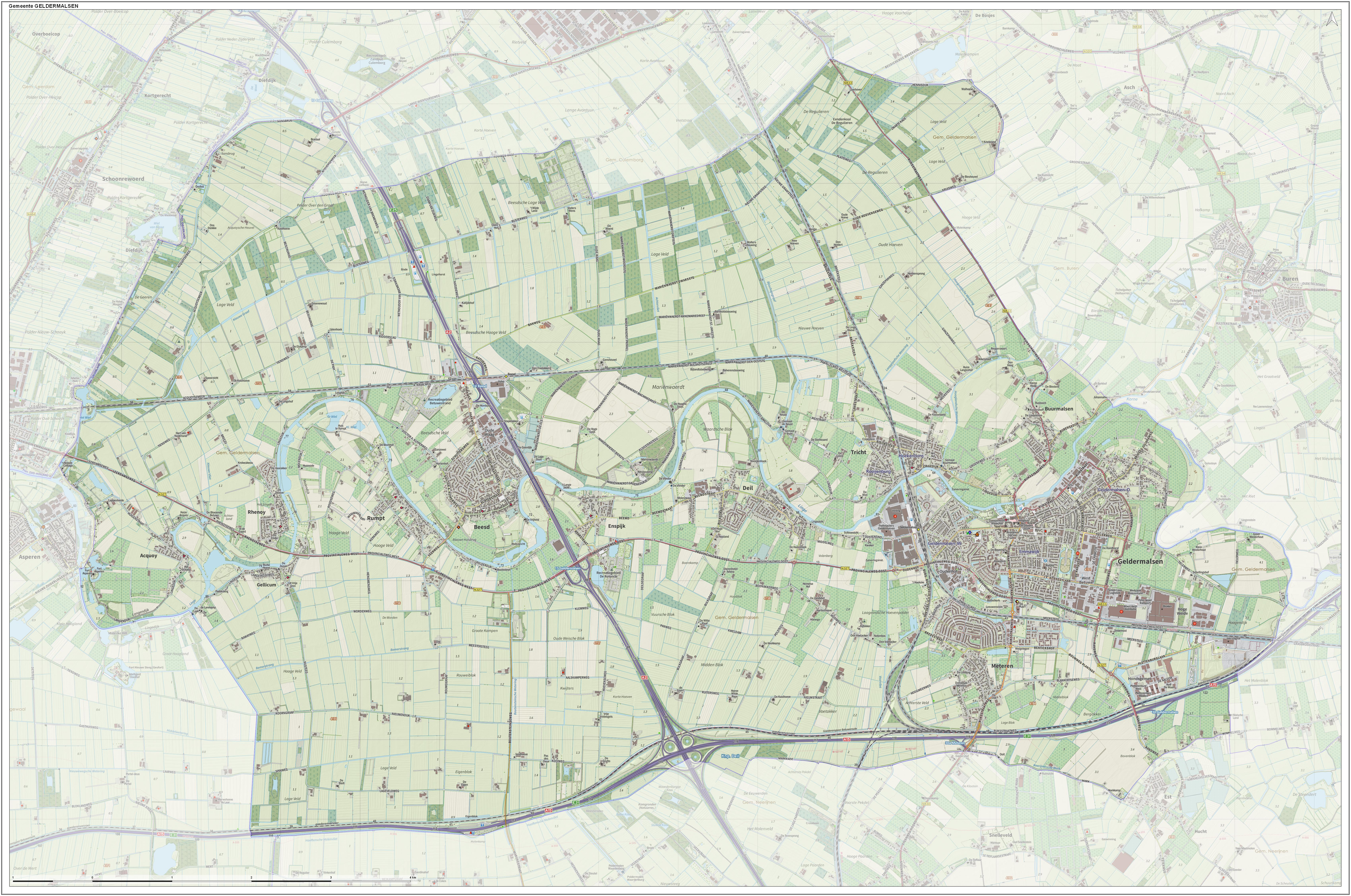
Dutch topographic map of the municipality of Geldermalsen, June 2015

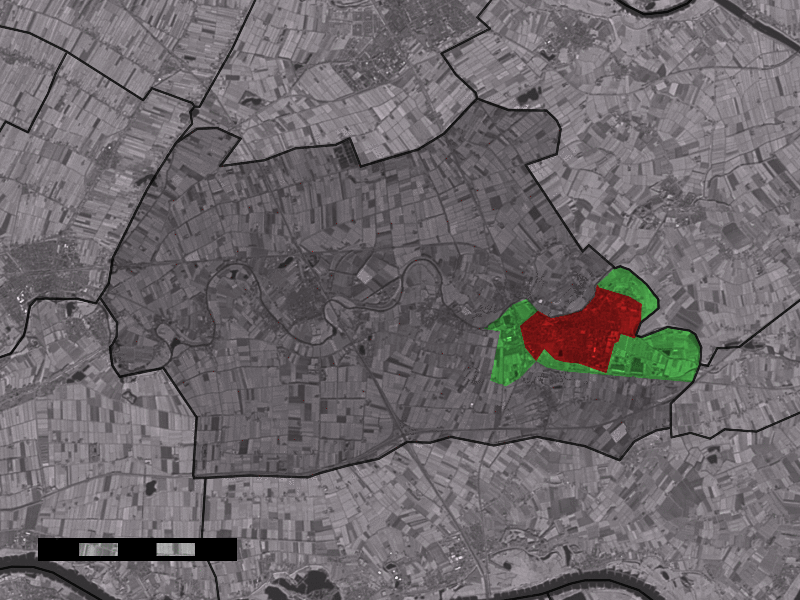
The town of Geldermalsen within the former municipality of Geldermalsen

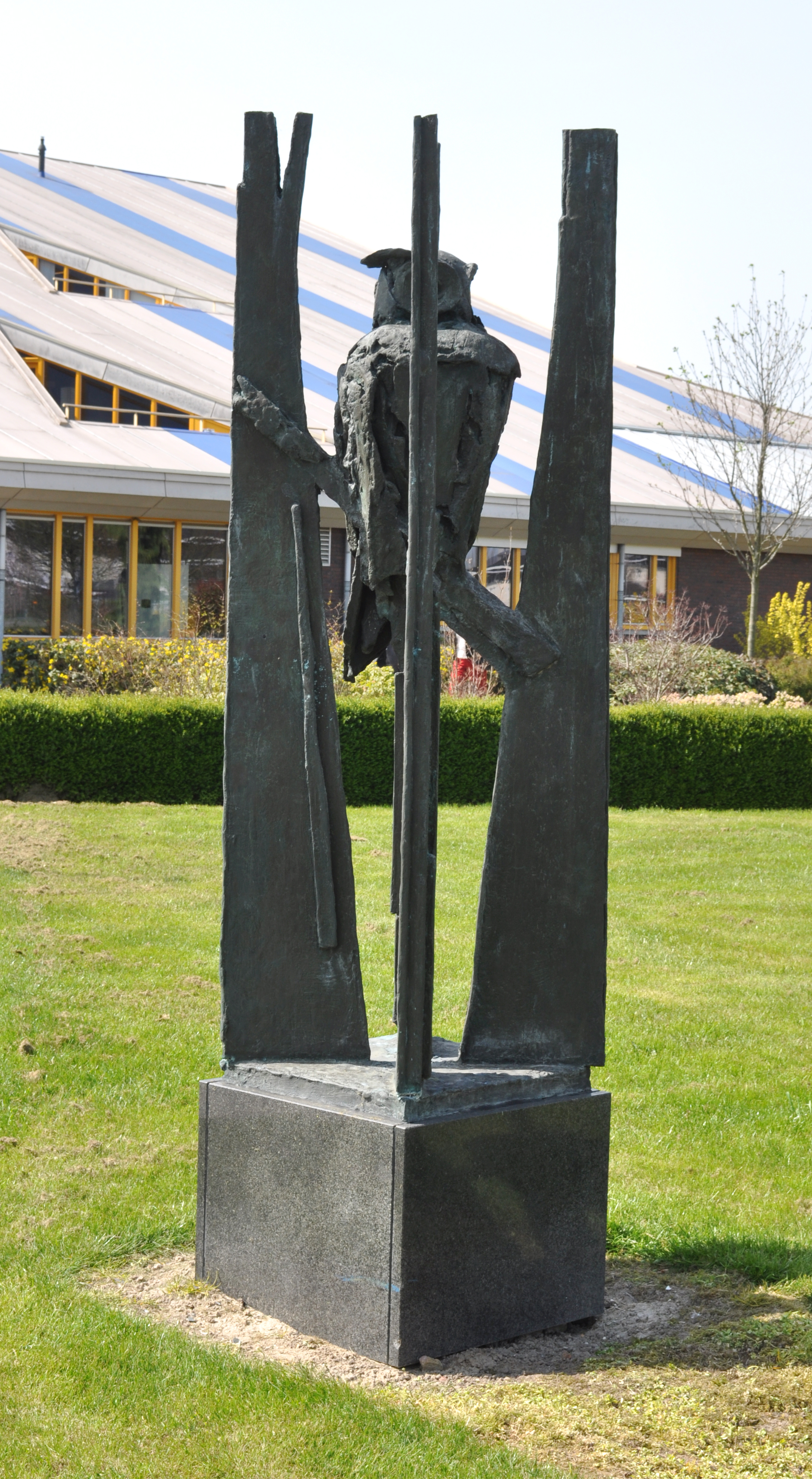
Sculpture 'Uil' in front of the Lingeborgh

Geldermalsen (Dutch pronunciation: [ˌɣɛldərˈmɑlsə(n)]) is a town and former municipality in the province of Gelderland in the Netherlands.

== Town of Geldermalsen ==
The town centre of Geldermalsen contains a two-aisled Gothic church dating from the 15th century, with a Romanesque tower dating from the 13th century. The town contains two windmills: De Watermolen, which was built in 1772, and De Bouwing, which was built in 1848. Located in the east side there is a graveyard.

Public high-school 'The Lingeborgh' is located in the west.

== Former municipality of Geldermalsen ==
The municipality of Geldermalsen was formed on 1 January 1978, when the former municipalities of Beesd, Buurmalsen, Deil and Geldermalsen were combined. The municipality had an area of 101.73 km^{2} (39.28 sq mi) and was one of the largest municipalities in the Betuwe. The municipality had a population of data missing in 2021. On 1 January 2019 it merged with Neerijnen and Lingewaal to form the new municipality West Betuwe.

The river Linge flows through the municipality and town of Geldermalsen.

=== Population centres ===
- Acquoy
- Beesd
- Buurmalsen
- Deil
- Enspijk
- Geldermalsen
- Gellicum
- Meteren
- Rhenoy
- Rumpt
- Tricht

== Demographics ==
Ethnic composition of Geldermalsen in 2010:

- Dutch: 91.7%
- Black: 0.9%
- European: 4.5%
- Arabs: 1.4%
- Other non-Western: 1.4%:

== See also ==
- 2015 Geldermalsen riot
