= 2015 Geldermalsen riot =

- Part of the European migrant crisis
- Location: Geldermalsen, Netherlands
- Date: 16 December 2015
- Attack type: Rioting
- Weapons: Stones, fireworks, bottles
- Injuries: 3+
- Perpetrator: 14 arrested
- No. of participants: 2,000 local protesters
- Defender: Geldermalsen police

The 2015 Geldermalsen riot was a riot on December 16, 2015 in the Dutch town of Geldermalsen. It started out as a protest against plans to build a new housing complex for 1,500 asylum seekers.

== Riots ==
On 16 December 2015, the Geldermalsen city council met to discuss whether to build new accommodation for refugees who had arrived during the 2015 refugee crisis. Around 2,000 locals in Geldermalsen came to the meeting to protest, which escalated into a riot. The protesters attempted to storm the town hall, throwing beer bottles, fireworks and stones while city leaders discussed the plans inside. Several protesters, two police officers and a businesswoman inside the city hall suffered injuries during the riot.

== Aftermath ==
The Dutch Secretary for Security and Justice, Klaas Dijkhoff, condemned the rioting, saying, "finding shelter for asylum seekers poses difficult questions but there is a limit when it comes to expressing your opinion. The line is crossed when you barge in yelling and rioting."

The city later cancelled the planned housing complex, admitting that the plans had been made too quickly and without enough consultation with locals.

== See also ==
- Timeline of the European migrant crisis
