= De Vlinder, Deil =

Tower mill in Deil, Netherlands, built in 1913

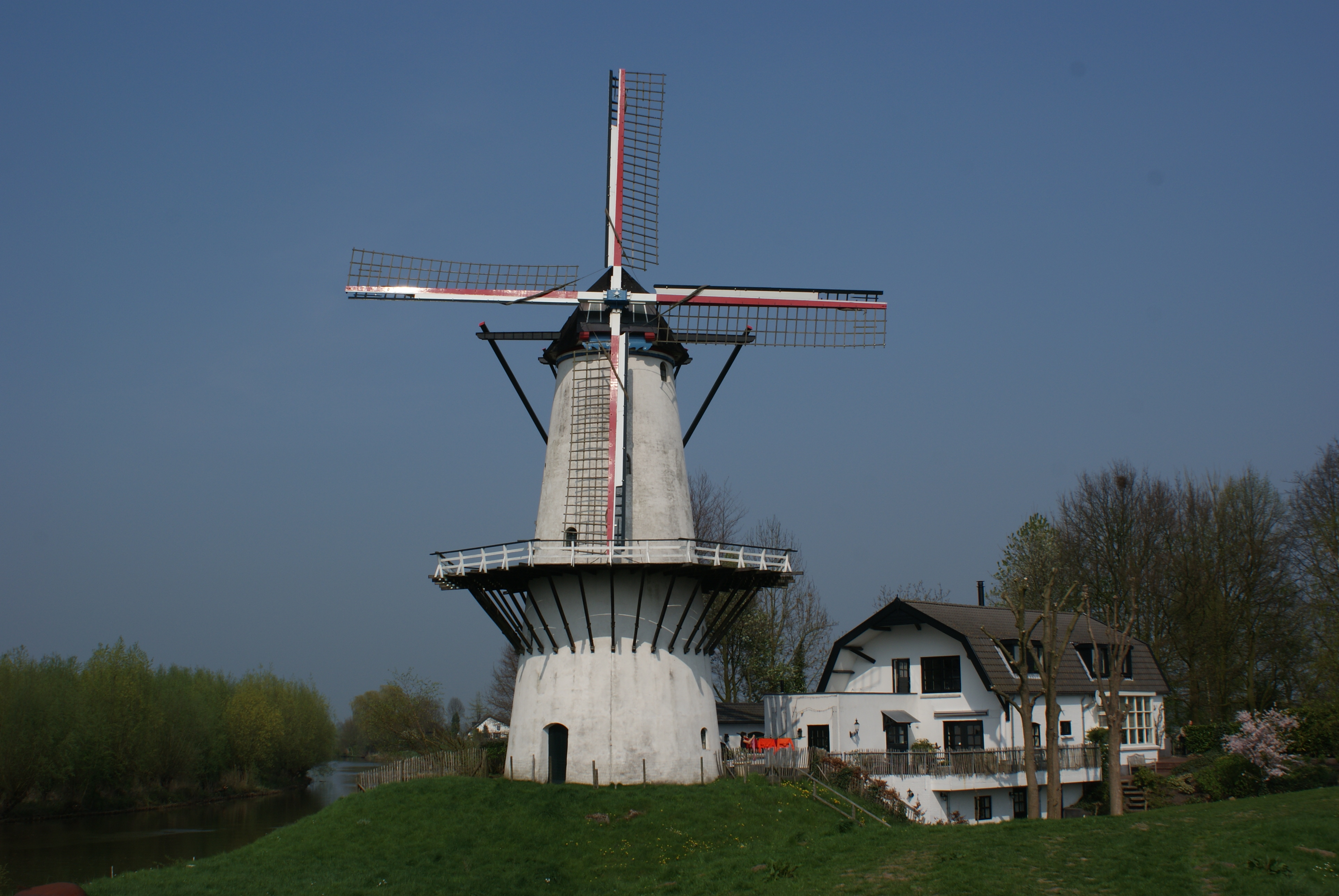
- The mill in April 2009

Origin
- Mill name: De Vlinder
- Mill location: Appeldijk 4, 4158 ES, Deil
- Coordinates: 51°53′15″N 5°13′33″E
- Operator(s): Molenstichting voor het Gelders Rivierengebeid.
- Year built: 1913

Information
- Purpose: Corn mill
- Type: Tower mill
- Storeys: Five storeys
- No. of sails: Four sails
- Type of sails: Common sails
- Windshaft: Cast iron
- Winding: Tailpole and winch
- No. of pairs of millstones: Two pairs
- Size of millstones: 1.40 metres (4 ft 7 in) diameter

De Vlinder (English: The Butterfly) is a tower mill in Deil, Gelderland, Netherlands which was built in 1913 and has been restored to working order. The mill is listed as a Rijksmonument.

== History ==
The first mill on this site was a hollow post mill which was built before 1832. It burnt down in 1913. To replace it, a tower mill was built, named De Haas (English: The Hare). The mill was burnt out during a storm in March 1931. It was repaired the same year, using parts from the Molen van Fikse, Heukelum, Gelderland, which was demolished in that year. The tower had to be shortened by 1.5 metres (5 ft) to accommodate the machinery from the Molen van Fikse. The cap, windshaft and sails were also used. The new mill was named De Vlinder.

In 1951, De Vlinder was sold to the Stichting Behoud Korenmolen Deil. It was restored in 1961, 1975 and again in 2001–02. It is now in the ownership of the Molenstichting voor het Gelders Rivierengebeid. It is listed as a Rijksmonument, No. 16495.

== Description ==
De Vlinder is what the Dutch call a "Stellingmolen". It is a five-storey tower mill. There is a stage, which is 7.20 metres (23 ft 7 in) above ground level. The cap is covered in dakleer. Winding is by tailpole and winch. The sails are Common sails. They have a span of 20.00 metres (65 ft 7 in). They are carried on a cast iron windshaft, which was cast by Penn en Compagnie, Dordrecht, South Holland in 1855. The windshaft also carries the brake wheel, which has 53 cogs. This drives a wallower with 24 cogs, which is situated at the top of the upright shaft. At the bottom of the upright shaft is the great spur wheel, which has 68 cogs. This drives a pair of 1.40 metres (4 ft 7 in) diameter Cullen millstones and a pair of 1.40 metres (4 ft 7 in) diameter French Burr stones via lantern pinion stone nuts with 20 staves each.

== Public access ==
De Vlinder is open on Saturday from 11:00 to 16:00, or by appointment.
