= Buurmalsen =

- Village
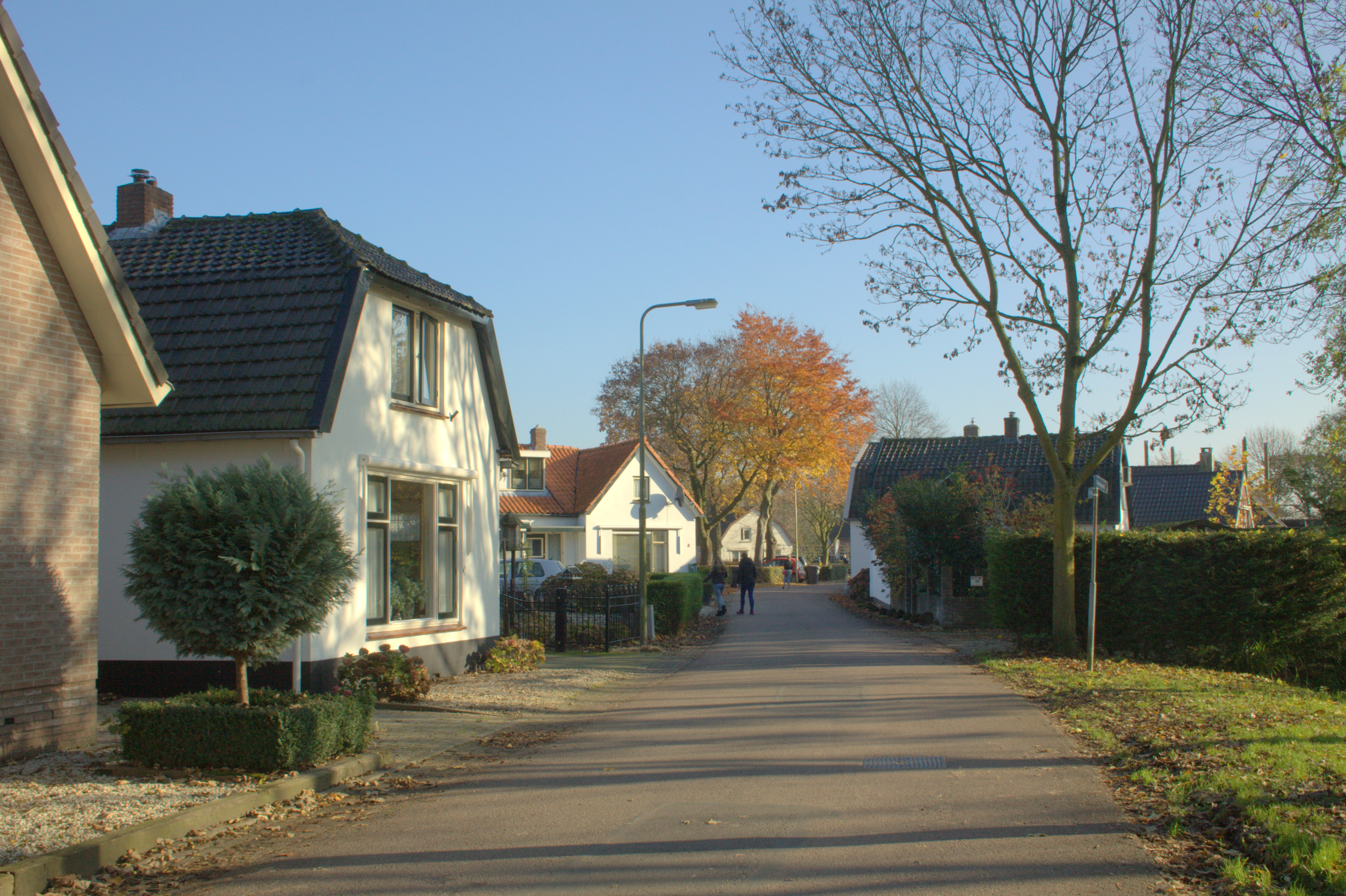
- Street view

- Coat of arms

- Location in the Netherlands Buurmalsen (Netherlands)
- Coordinates: 51°53′34″N 5°17′33″E
- Country: Netherlands
- Province: Gelderland
- Municipality: West Betuwe; Buren

Area
  - Total: 21.19 km^{2} (8.18 sq mi)
- Elevation: 4 m (13 ft)

Population (2021)
  - Total: 3,310
  - Density: 156/km^{2} (405/sq mi)
- Time zone: UTC+1 (CET)
  - Summer (DST): UTC+2 (CEST)
- Postal code: 4196 & 4197
- Dialing code: 0345

Buurmalsen is a village in the Dutch province of Gelderland. It is a part of the municipality of West Betuwe, and lies about 9 km west of Tiel. Part of the village is located in Buren.

Buurmalsen was a separate municipality from 1818 to 1978, when it became a part of Geldermalsen.

The village is the ancestral home of former president of the United States, Martin Van Buren, whose ancestor Cornelis Maessen immigrated to New Netherland in 1631.

== History ==
It was first mentioned in 850 as Uberan Malsna, and means "settlement on the river Malsna near Buren". The origin of Malsna is unknown. Buurmalsen started along the Lek River and developed into a concentrated esdorp. The Dutch Reformed Church dates from around 1100 and has a tower from the early 15th century. It was restored between 1987 and 1989. In 1840, it was home to 465 people.

== Gallery ==
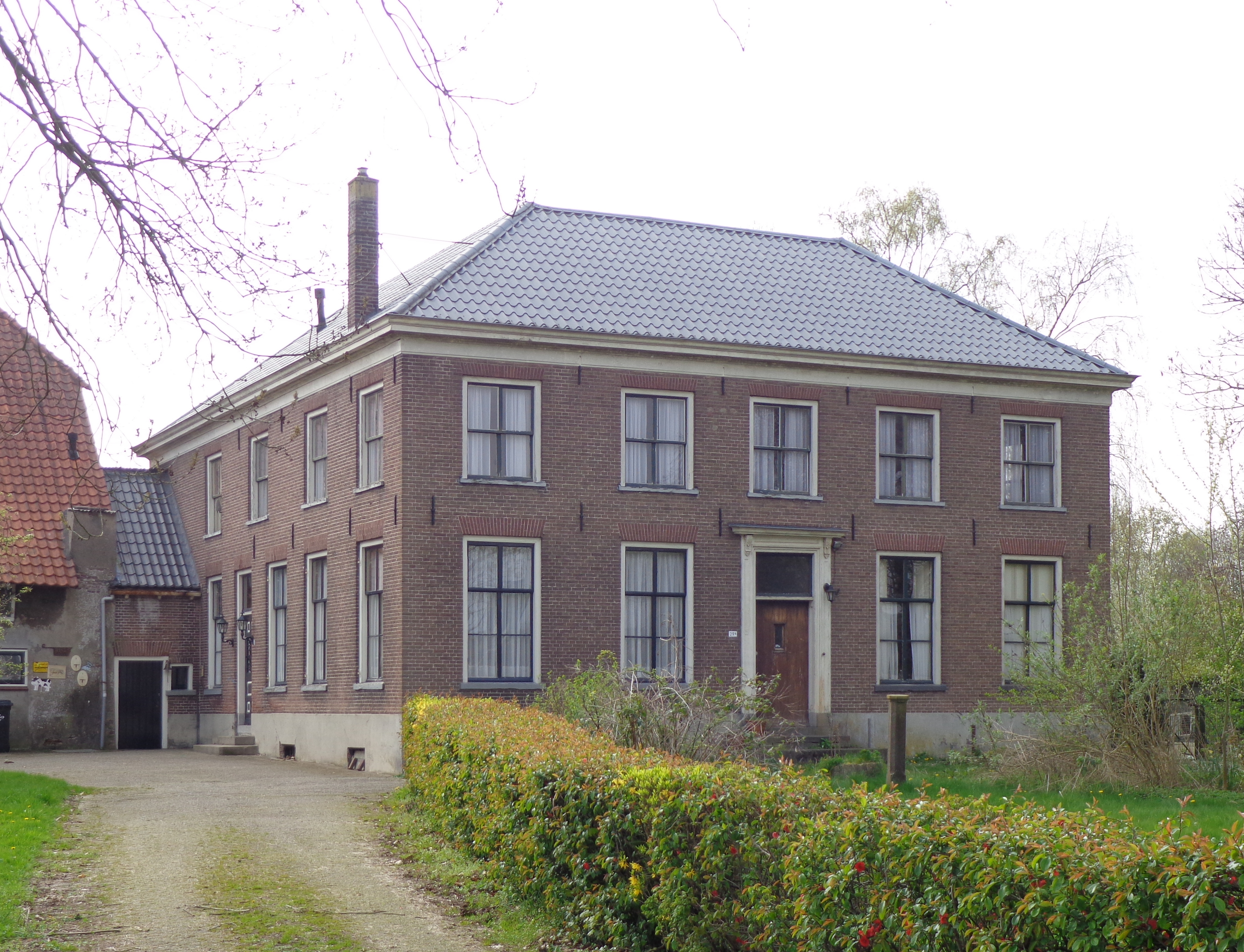
Farm Malsenburg

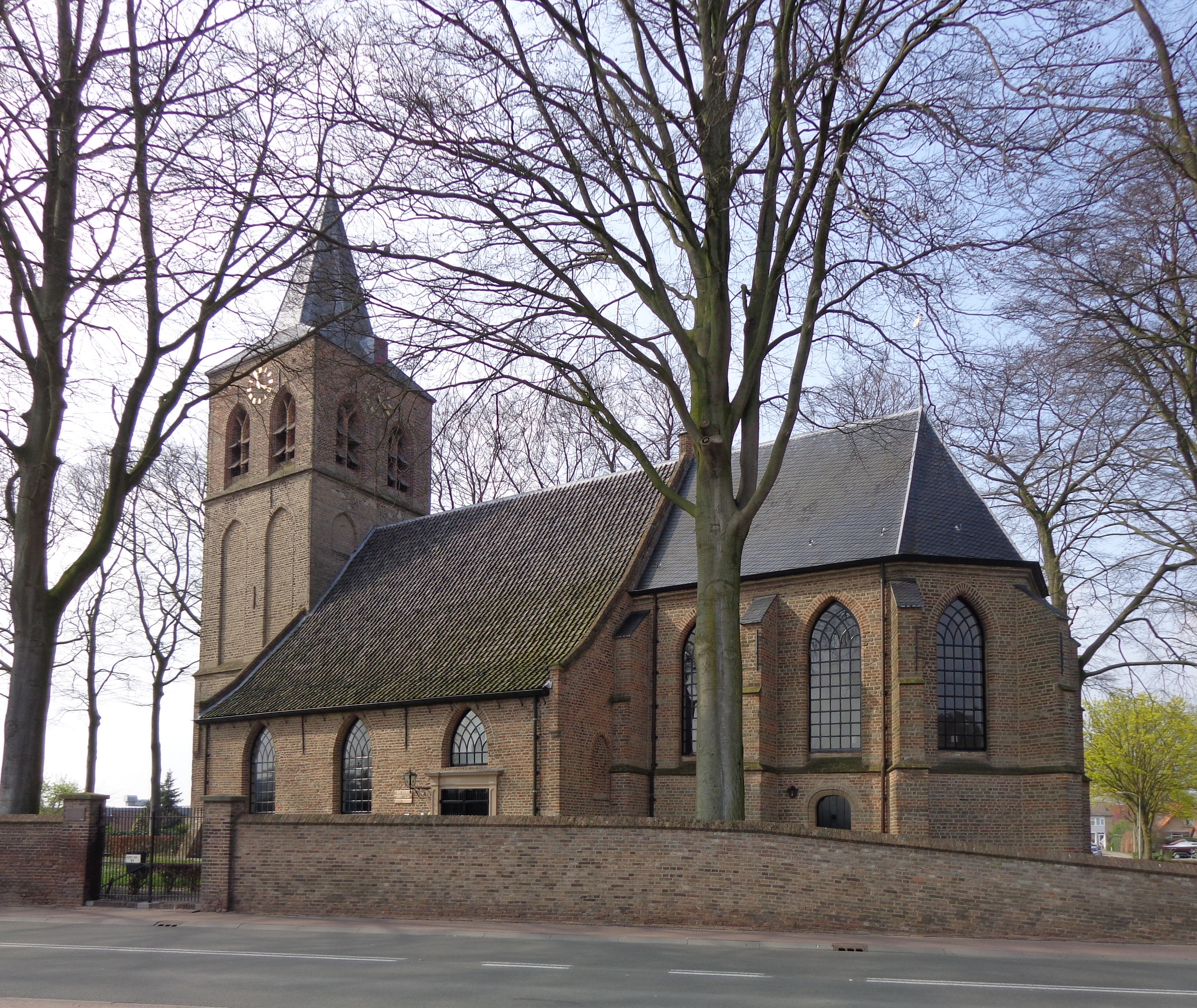
Dutch reformed church

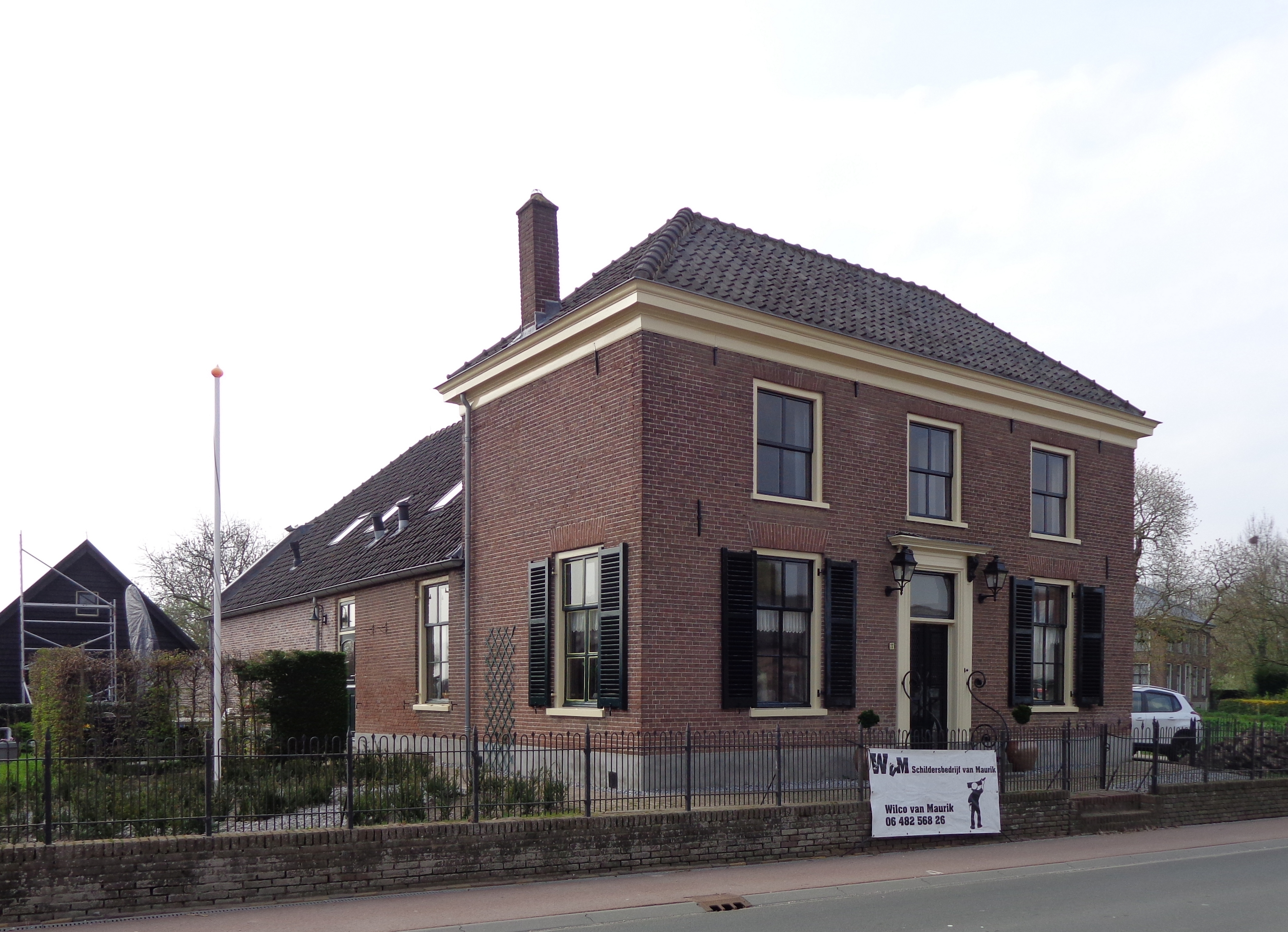
Farm in Buurmalsen

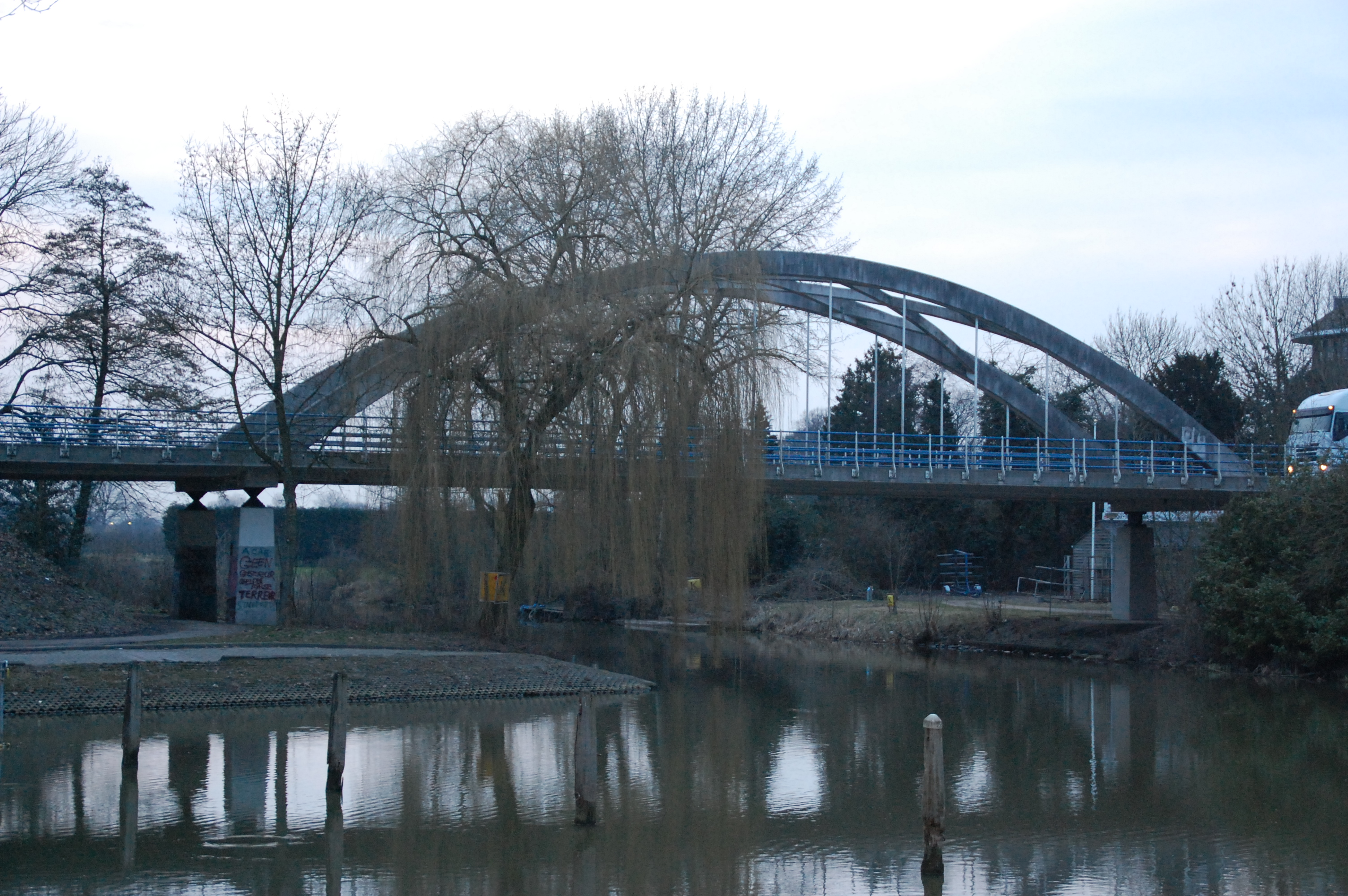
Bridge to Geldermalsen
