= Deil =

- Village
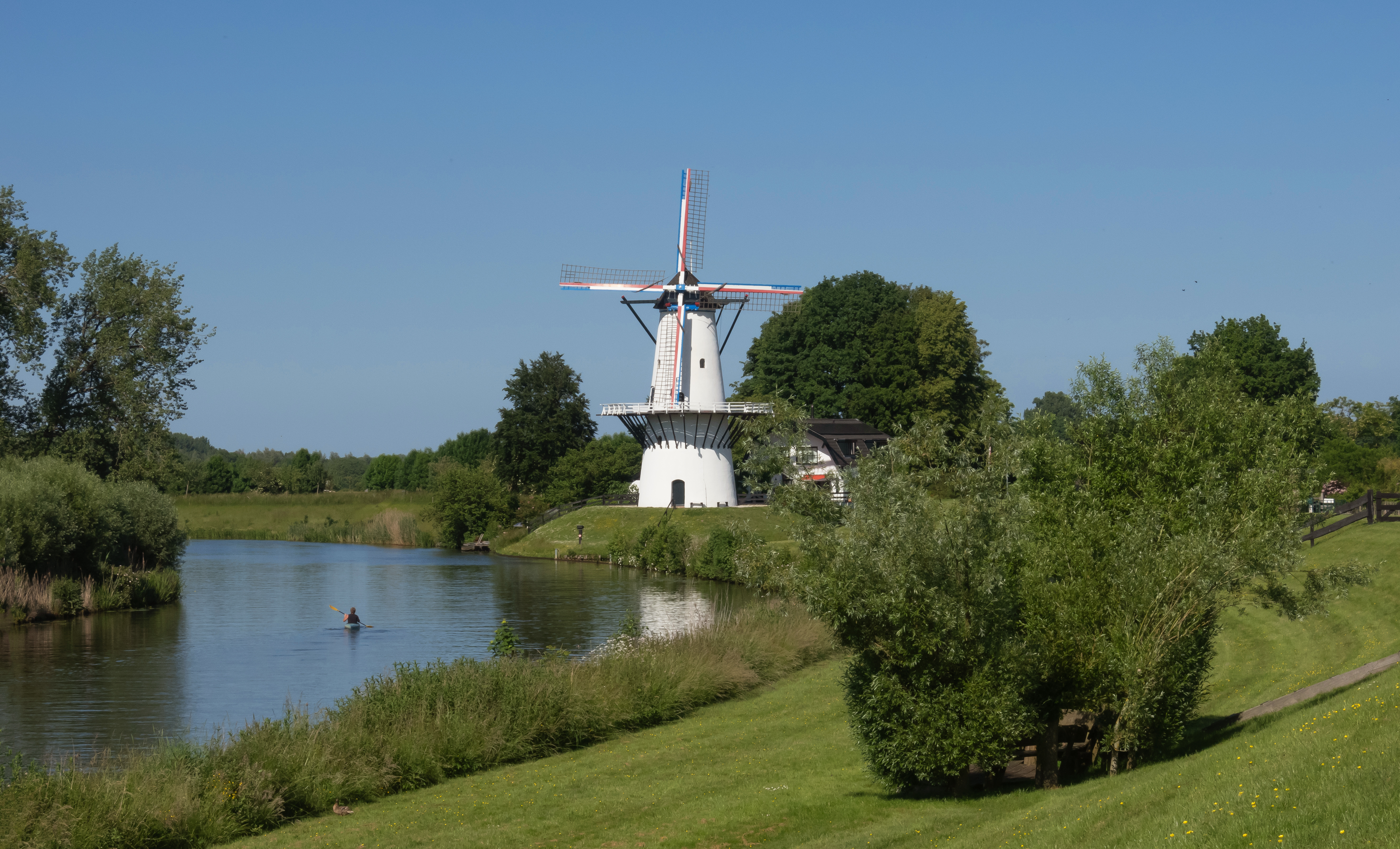
- Deil, windmill: molen de Vlinder

- Flag Coat of arms

- Location in the Netherlands Deil (Netherlands)
- Coordinates: 51°53′3″N 5°14′39″E
- Country: Netherlands
- Province: Gelderland
- Municipality: West Betuwe

Area
  - Total: 7.9 km^{2} (3.1 sq mi)

Population (2018)
  - Total: 2.097
  - Density: 0.27/km^{2} (0.69/sq mi)
- Time zone: UTC+1 (CET)
  - Summer (DST): UTC+2 (CEST)

Deil is a village in the Dutch province of Gelderland. It is a part of the municipality of West Betuwe, and lies about 12 km west of Tiel.

Deil was a separate municipality until 1978, when it became a part of Geldermalsen. In January 2019 Deil became part of a newly formed municipality, when the former municipalities of Geldermalsen, Neerijnen and Lingewaal joined to form the municipality of West-Betuwe.

In 2019, the village of Deil had 2097 inhabitants. The built-up area of the village was 0.38 km^{2}, and contained 840 residences. There is a restored windmill in the village, De Vlinder.

== Gallery ==
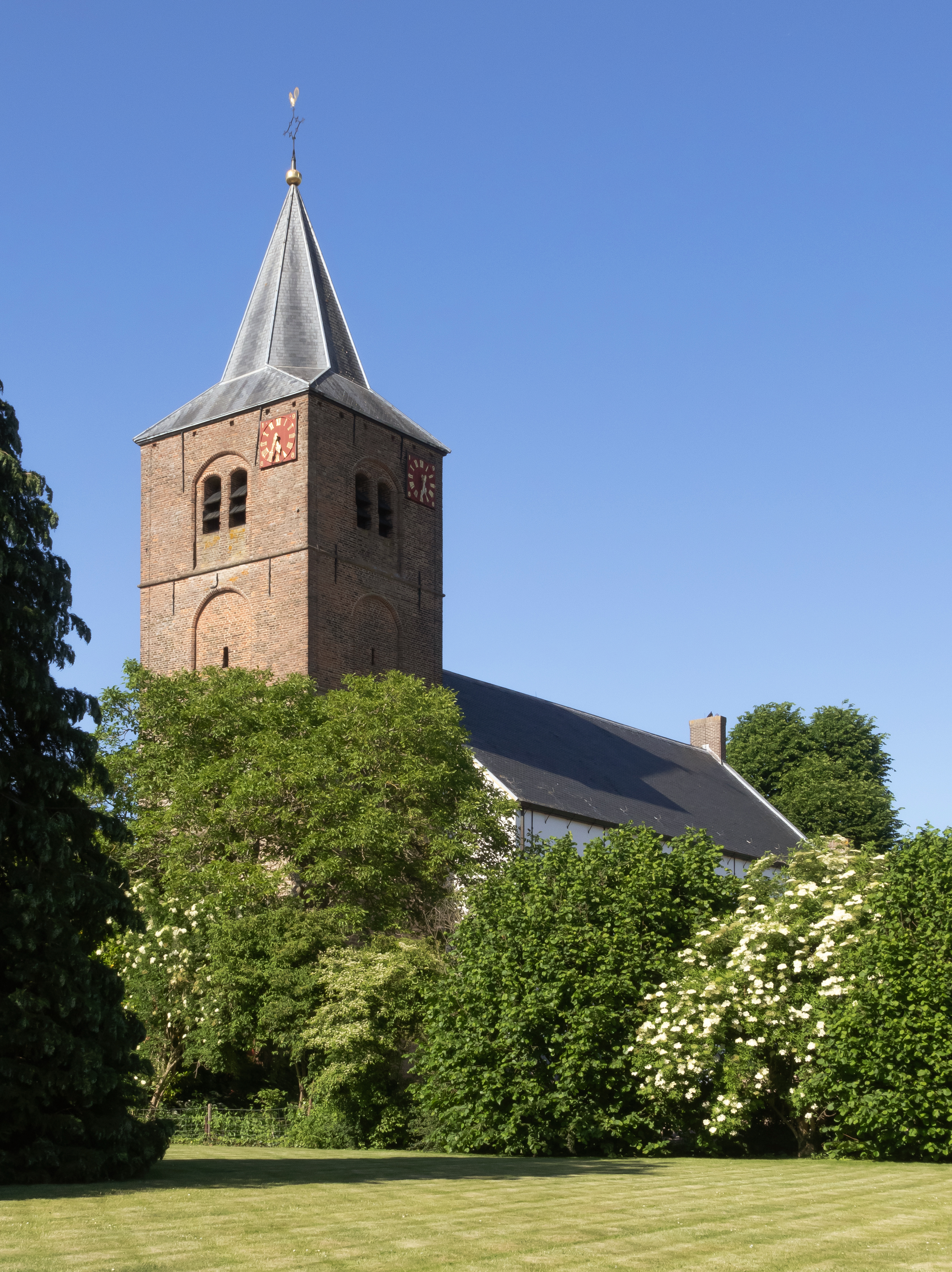
Deil, reformed church

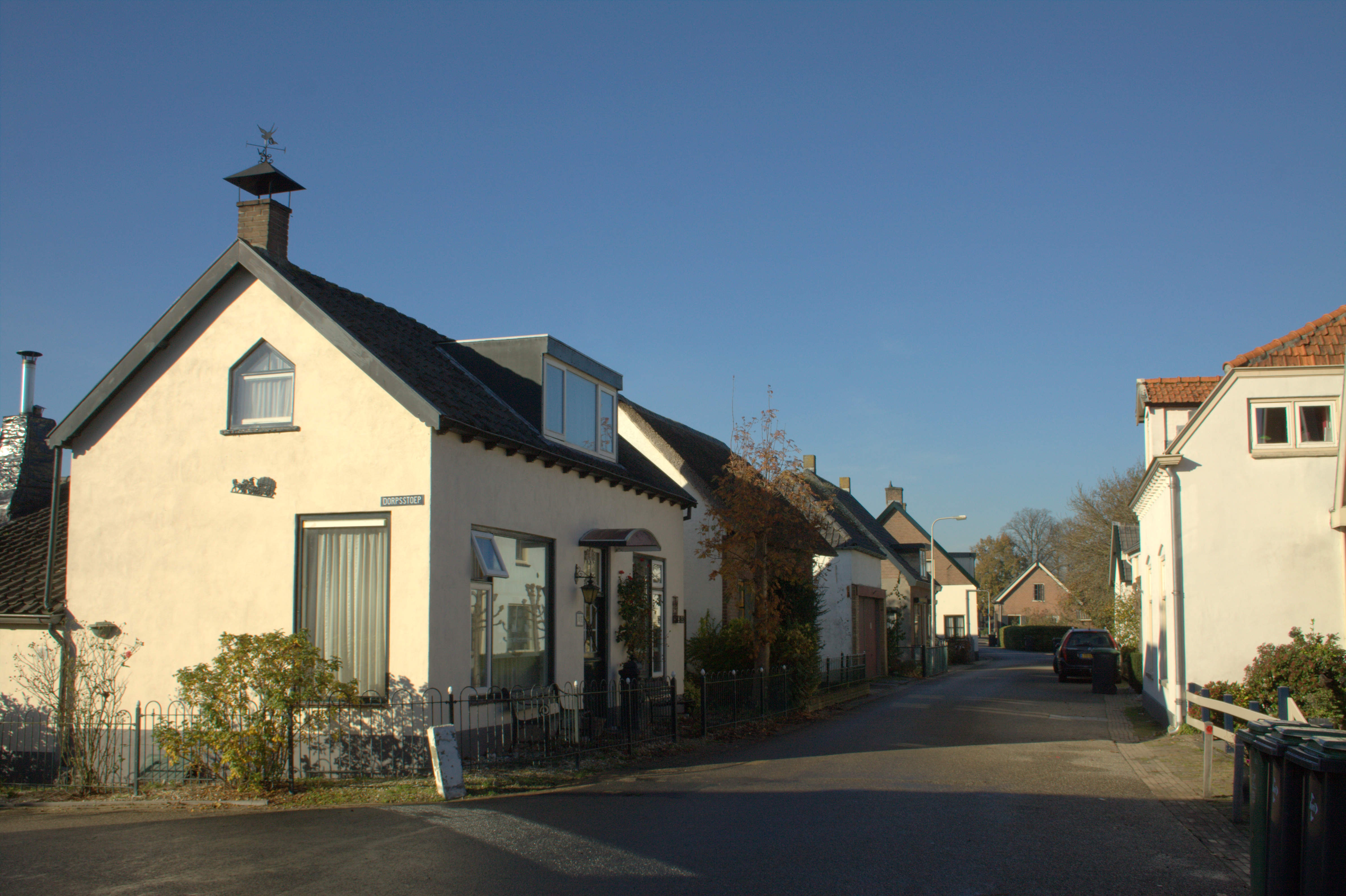
Street view

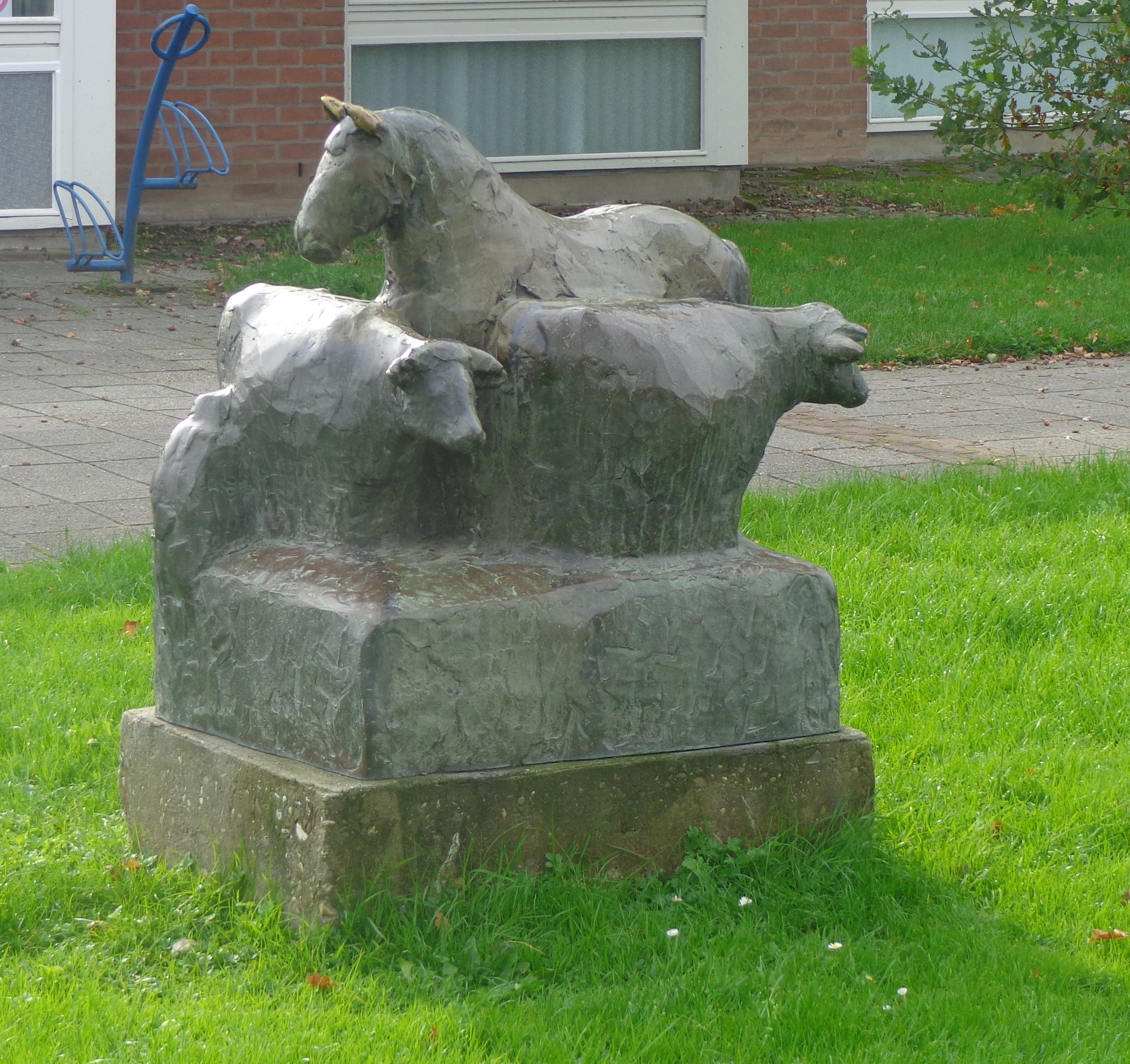
Ox and horse statue

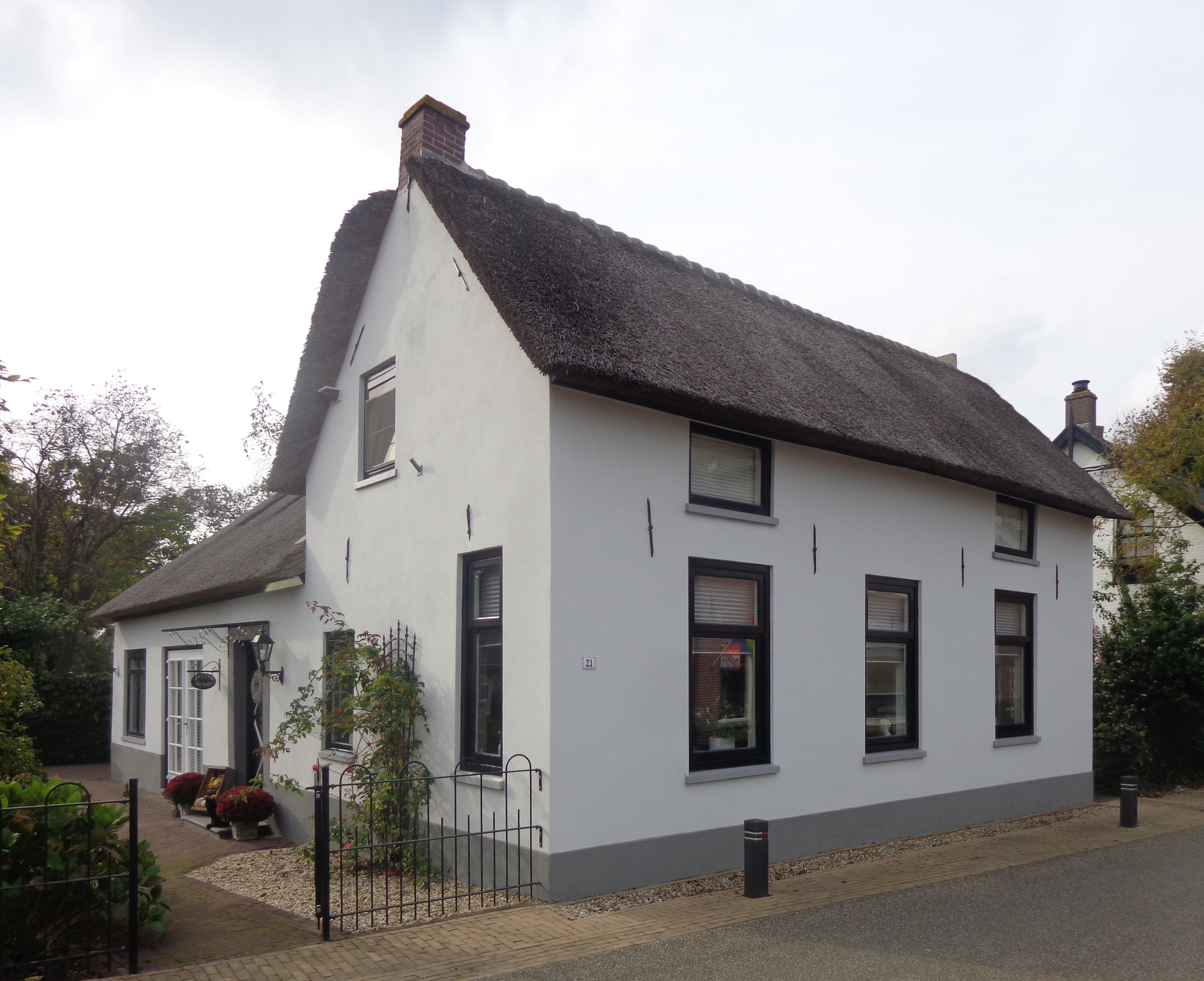
House in Deil
