= Gellicum =

- Village
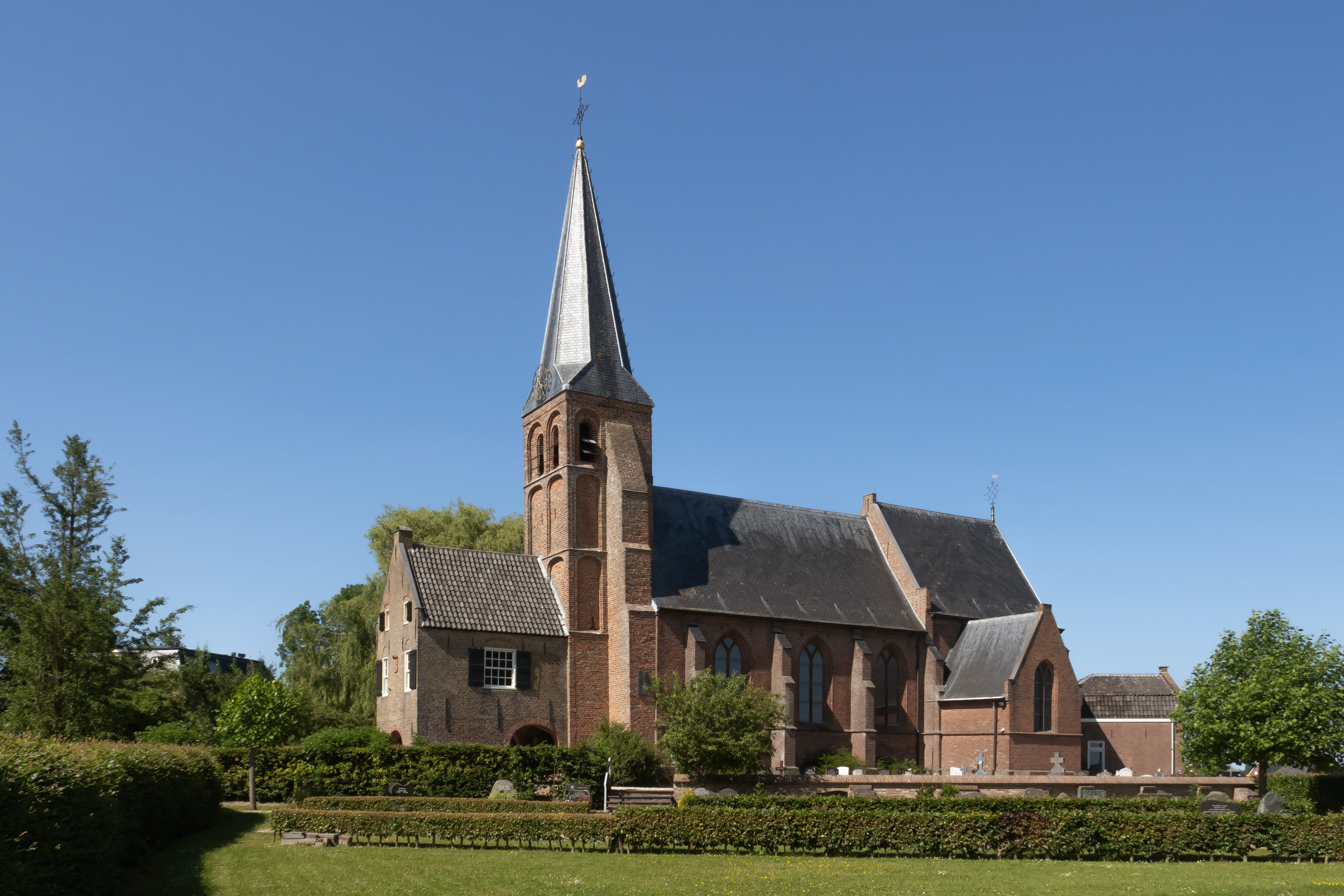
- Church: the Onze Lieve Vrouwe Geboortekerk in Gellicum

- Flag Coat of arms

- Location in the Netherlands Gellicum (Netherlands)
- Coordinates: 51°52′34″N 5°9′17″E
- Country: Netherlands
- Province: Gelderland
- Municipality: West Betuwe

Area
  - Total: 5.45 km^{2} (2.10 sq mi)
- Elevation: 3 m (9.8 ft)

Population (2021)
  - Total: 345
  - Density: 63.3/km^{2} (164/sq mi)
- Time zone: UTC+1 (CET)
  - Summer (DST): UTC+2 (CEST)
- Postal code: 4155
- Dialing code: 0345

Gellicum is a village in the Dutch province of Gelderland. It is a part of the municipality of West Betuwe, and lies about 13 km east of Gorinchem.

It was first mentioned in the 10th to 11th century Gallinghe(m), and means "settlement of the people of Gallo (person)". Gellicum developed as a stretched out esdorp perpendicular to the dike of the Linge. The tower of the Roman Catholic Church dates from the 13th century and has been enlarged in the 15th century. The church dates from the 14th century. The court house has been built in 1630 attached to the church. The Dutch Reformed Church was originally built in 1823, but burnt down and replaced in 1929. In 1840, it was home to 340 people.

== Gallery ==
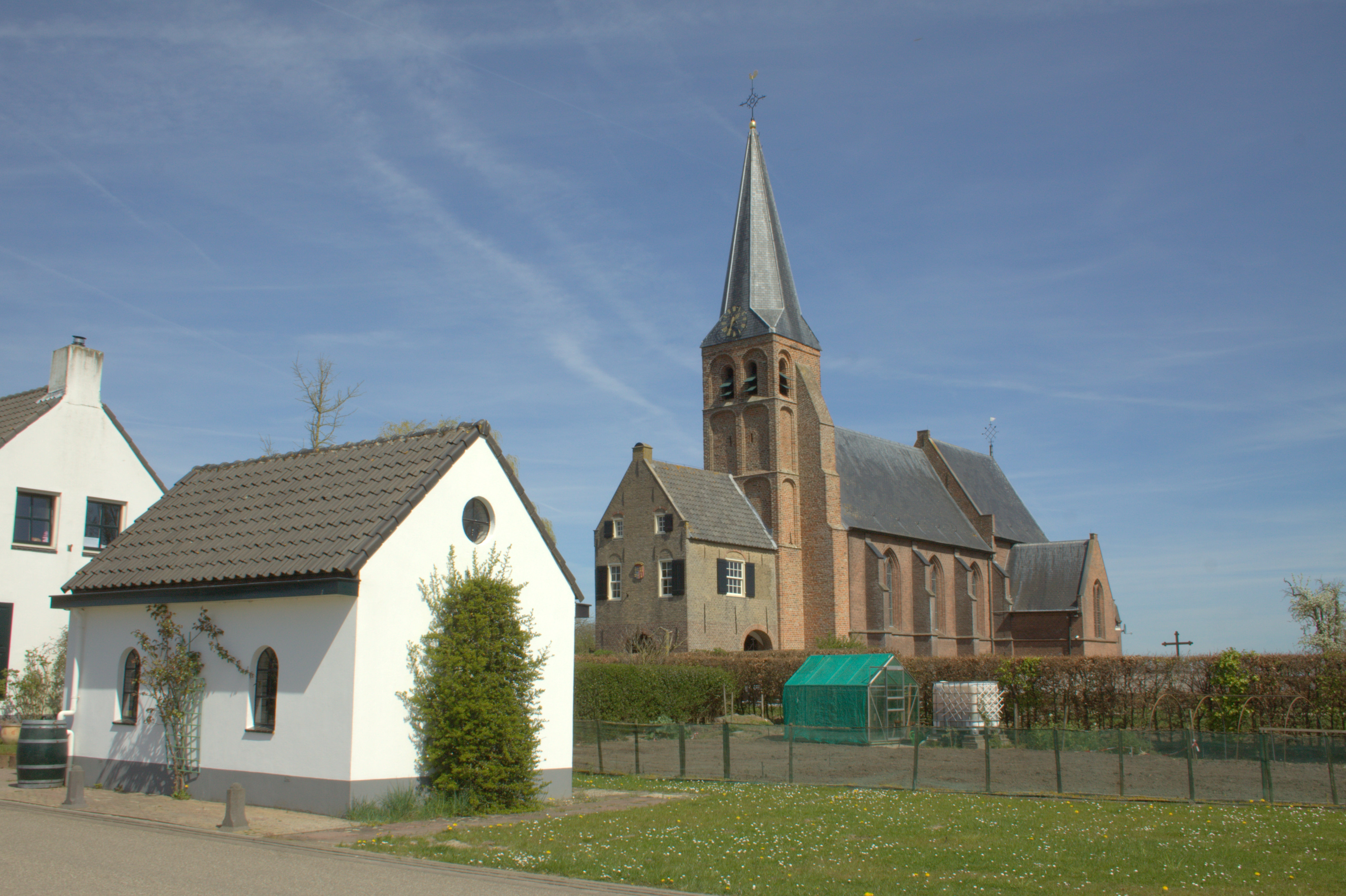
Dutch Reformed Church

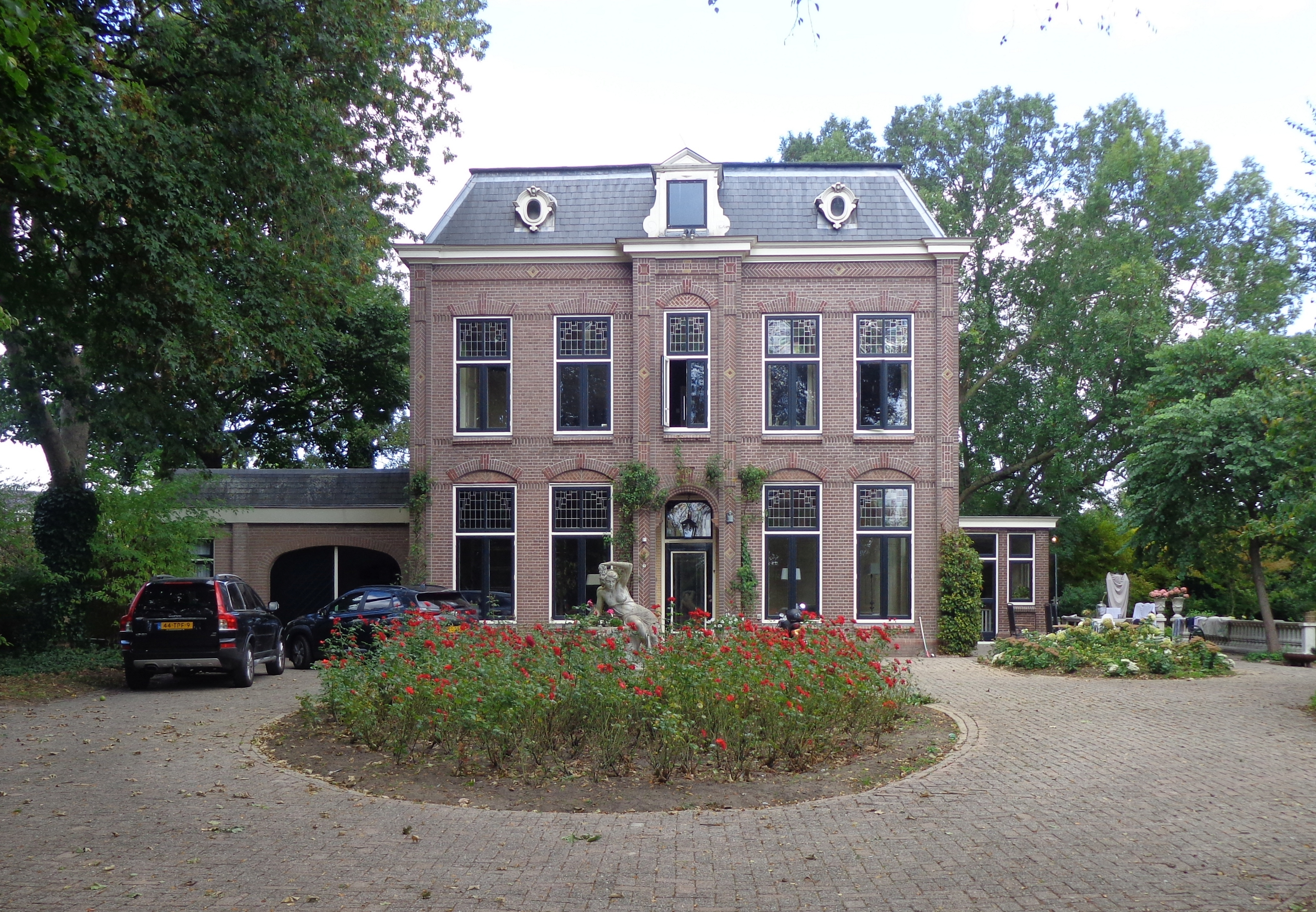
Villa in Gellicum

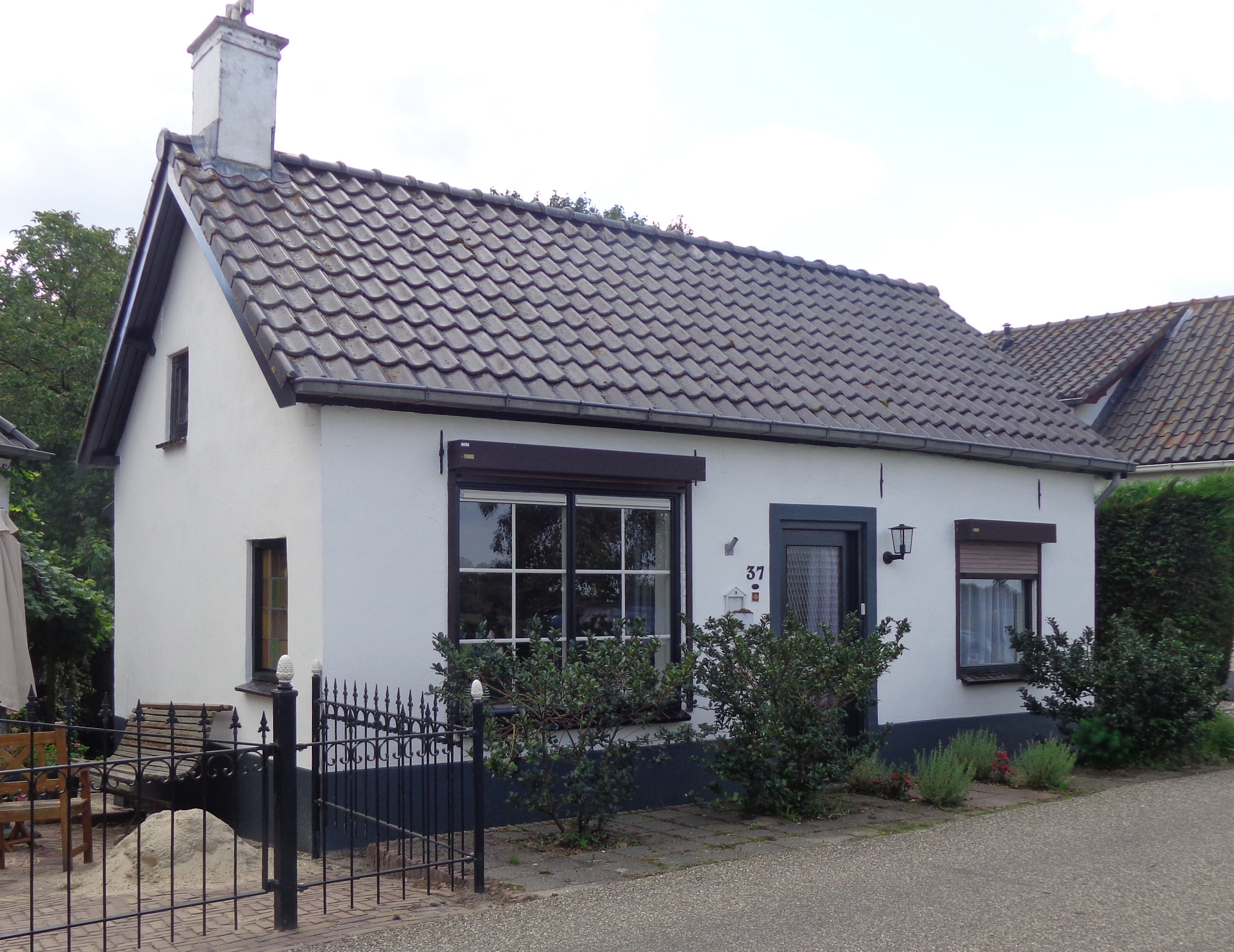
House in Gellicum

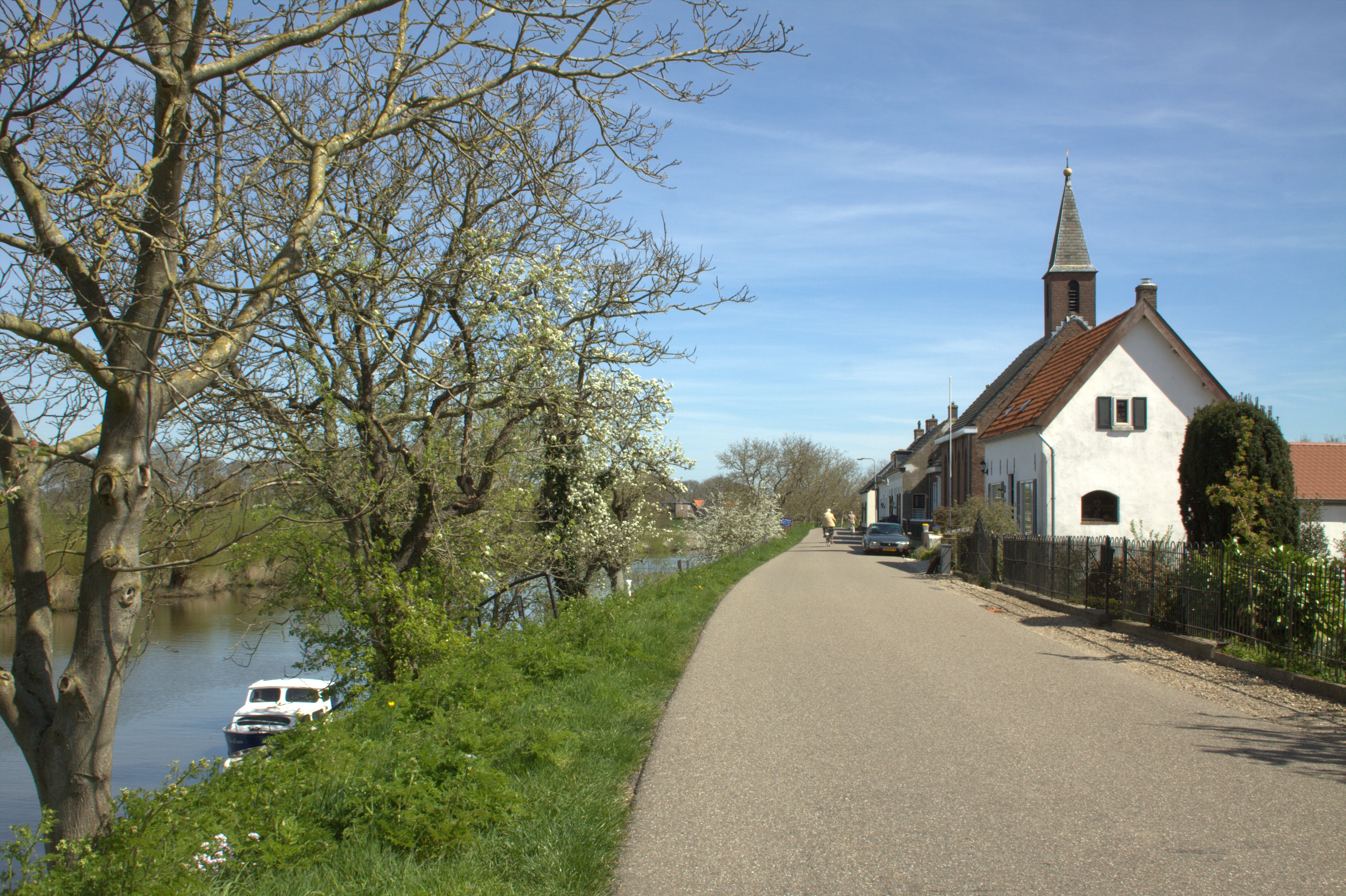
Street view
